= New England theology =

Division of Congregationalism (1732–1880)

New England theology (or Edwardsianism) is a school of theology which grew up among the Congregationalists of New England, originating in the year 1732, when Jonathan Edwards began his constructive theological work, culminating a little before the American Civil War, declining afterwards, and rapidly disappearing after the year 1880.

During this period it became the dominant school among Congregationalists, and led to division among Presbyterians into two strains: the New School Presbyterians (who leaned towards New England teachings) and the Old School Presbyterians (who repudiated dilution of the Westminster Standards). This theology was the basis of all the seminaries of the Congregationalists and several of the Presbyterians, and furnished the impetus for social change which birthed the American Board of Commissioners for Foreign Missions, established a series of colleges from Amherst in the East to Pacific University in the West, and led in a great variety of practical efforts to extend the Christian religion.

It can be described as the Calvinism of the Westminster Confession and the Synod of Dort, modified by a conception of God taken by its advocates to be more ethical; by a new emphasis upon the liberty, ability, and responsibility of man; by the restriction of moral quality to action in distinction from nature (cf. original sin and total depravity); and by the theory that the constitutive principle of virtue is benevolence. The New England theology went through several stages, including the New Divinity espoused by Samuel Hopkins and the New Haven theology espoused by Nathaniel W. Taylor.

== Edwards's theology ==
Jonathan Edwards (1703–1758) was a New England Congregationalist minister, part of a Calvinist tradition with a strong Puritan heritage. By the time Edwards had been ordained in 1727, there were already signs of a growing division among New England's Congregationalists between the more traditional, "Old-Style Calvinism" and those of a more "free and catholick" outlook who were increasingly influenced by Enlightenment rationalism and Arminianism.

In these debates, Edwards took the side of traditional Calvinism. Yet, through his theological writings, he defended it using the philosophical language of the 18th century, producing a "monumental reconstruction of strict Reformed orthodoxy". A spiritual and intellectual leader in the First Great Awakening, most of his publications between 1737 and 1746 addressed the Awakening. As a supporter of moderate revivalism, Edwards became, in the words of historian Sydney Ahlstrom, "one of the most important interpreters of religious experience and experiential religion in post-Reformation history."

=== Original sin ===
According to traditional Reformed views on original sin and imputation of sin, Adam, the first man, was the "federal" or covenant head of all humanity. When Adam committed the first sin, God imputed his sin to all humans, who thereafter share in a corrupt nature, leading to individuals committing their own actual sins and incurring their own individual guilt. Therefore, God imputes sin to Adam's descendants prior to actual transgression on their part.

In the 18th century, theologians began questioning these traditional views, particularly the idea that humans are condemned at birth for Adam's sin, in which they had no active role. English Presbyterian minister John Taylor wrote in The Scripture Doctrine of Original Sin (1750) that "a Representative, the Guilt of whose Conduct shall be imputed to us, and whose Sins shall corrupt and debauch our Nature, is one of the greatest Absurdities in all the System of corrupt Religion. ... [Anyone] who dares use his Understanding, must clearly see this is unreasonable, and altogether inconsistent with the Truth, and Goodness of God."

In 1758, Edwards published The Great Christian Doctrine of Original Sin Defended to defend the Reformed view against the attacks of Taylor and others by showing that all of mankind was complicit in the fall. Edwards found a harmony of the will between Adam (as the head) and the rest of humanity. As church historian Robert Caldwell explains,"as soon as human beings come into existence, their initial moral acts, united to Adam's, immediately concur with Adam's transgression, and on that basis they become guilty of Adam's sin. ... In short, our first sins are the extended act of Adam's original transgression." Therefore, in Edwards's theology, there is no imputation of a completely alien guilt because all human beings share in Adam's actual transgression. This distinguishes Edwards from the traditional Reformed teaching that imputation of sin to Adam's descendants occurred prior to any actual transgression. On this point, Edwards writes, "The apostasy is not theirs, merely because God imputes it to them; but it is truly and properly theirs, and on that ground, God imputes it to them."

=== Freedom of the will ===
Another traditional Reformed teaching under attack in the 18th century was the doctrine of total depravity, that sinful humans are by nature unable to love or submit to God. Inspired by Enlightenment ideas of freedom and liberty, some theologians were replacing Calvinism with an Arminian view on free will. In Freedom of the Will (1754), Edwards attempted to show that human freedom was consistent with human depravity.

According to Edwards, "the will is as the greatest apparent good is." Once the mind discerns what action results in the greatest benefit to the self, the will is activated and a choice is made. The will is free, and freedom is, for Edwards, the power of the individual to do as he or she pleases. What pleases a person is determined by the character or orientation of their soul (the combination of tastes, biases and values). Edwards called this the soul's "disposition", and he believed this was what determined a person's perception of the greatest apparent good. Individuals cannot change the dispositions of their souls, nor would they want to. Therefore, for Edwards, "Because sinful human beings by nature have no disposition to submit to God, they will never see Christ as their greatest good and consequently will never choose to follow him."

Edwards went beyond traditional Calvinism, however, by making a distinction between the natural ability and the moral inability to follow Christ. Because sin does not annihilate the will, Edwards believed that all humans theoretically could choose to follow Christ, what he termed "natural ability". Nevertheless, sinful dispositions prevent the unregenerate individual from ever perceiving Christ as the greatest good, what Edwards termed "moral inability". Though unregenerate people can follow Christ, they never will because of their sinful dispositions. Edwards believed this explanation affirmed free will, human responsibility and human depravity. He also believed it left intact God's sovereignty in salvation because only God could grant a person's soul a new disposition capable of seeing God as the greatest good.

=== Disinterested love ===
Another major element of Edwards's theology is the concept of disinterested love. Edwards believed that true Christians are disinterested in themselves and completely preoccupied with the beauty of God and his desires, ways and purposes. Their lives are God-centered rather than self-centered. Attainment of this disinterested spirituality was only possible through regeneration and conversion, when the Holy Spirit allowed the individual to see and understand the inherent beauty and excellency of God.

Such disinterested spirituality was an important part of Edwards's own doctrine of assurance. If one's religious feelings or, in Edwards's language, affections (such as love and desire) are driven by self-interest (such as "God loves me" or "I am saved"), then they are not marks of true religion. In his view, authentic religious affections arise from the soul that is completely preoccupied with God's worth and excellency. In fact, Edwards notes that the truly converted will be so disinterested in themselves that their own salvation will not be their primary concern:

It has more frequently been so amongst us, that when persons have first had the Gospel ground of relief for lost sinners discovered to them, and have been entertaining their minds with the sweet prospect, they have thought nothing at that time of their being converted. ... There is wrought in them a holy repose of soul in God through Christ, and a secret disposition to fear and love him, and to hope for blessing from him in this way. And yet they have no imagination that they are now converted, it don't so much as come in their minds.

For Edwards, then, gaining assurance of one's salvation should not be the primary concern of a new convert. He believed assurance would develop as a convert grew in sanctification. The concept of disinterested love also led to an ethic of self-denial. The spread of the gospel and the salvation of people should be a Christian's primary concerns.

== New Divinity ==
In the aftermath of the Great Awakening, New England Congregationalism was divided into competing factions, including the followers of Edwards who were known as Edwardsians or New Divinity men. The other two factions included the liberal Old Lights and the traditional Old Calvinists. The liberals, led by Charles Chauncy (1705–1787), opposed the irrational enthusiasm of the revivals; this faction advocated universalism and their successors would become Unitarians. The traditional Old Calvinists, led by men such as Moses Mather (1719–1806) and Ezra Stiles (1727–1795), disagreed with what they considered deviations from orthodox Reformed theology, but this group ceased to exist during the Second Great Awakening. New Divinity men such as Joseph Bellamy (1719–1790), Samuel Hopkins (1721–1803) and Timothy Dwight (1752–1817) were revivalists who tried to steer a moderate course between Old Lights who opposed revival and radical New Lights who separated from the established Congregational churches. By the end of the 18th century, most Congregational churches were Edwardsian in orientation.

Edwards' distinction between natural ability and moral ability had implications for New Divinity preaching and evangelism that were departures from traditional Puritan beliefs. For the Puritans, conversion was a gradual process involving spiritual crises, humiliation, and sorrow for sin. Only after these struggles and utilizing the means of grace (prayer, seeking God, reading the Bible, and attending church) would the individual discern within himself faith and love for Christ and be encouraged to repent. New Divinity ministers, however, called all sinners to repent and believe the gospel immediately because everyone had the natural ability to do so. There was no reason, they said, to wait for any period of conviction and spiritual struggle. While immediate repentance was criticized by Old Calvinists, there was practically little difference between the two approaches. When asked how to repent, Old Calvinists and New Divinity ministers had the same advice: seek God through the means of grace and in time God might give the seeker new affections and inclinations to believe in Christ.

Edwardsians also worked to return Congregational churches to stricter rules regarding who could be admitted to the Lord's Supper, reversing a trend allowing the non-converted to participate (see Half-Way Covenant for more information).

The New Divinity's theology of religious experience was influenced by Edwards's works Treatise Concerning Religious Affections and The Nature of True Virtue. The New Divinity argued that the true Christian seeks the good of all things, including God and other people, above themselves. This was called "disinterested benevolence" because Christian benevolence is never self-serving, unlike the benevolence of the unconverted.

Disinterested benevolence was the basis for piety, according to the New Divinity. It originates at conversion when the Holy Spirit was believed to renew the heart so that the convert desires union with Christ through faith and embraces the way of the cross, which is self-sacrifice. In this, self-love is eliminated and the convert seeks happiness in God and his creation. For Edwards, a disinterest in one's self and a preoccupation with God's moral excellence was an indication that such a person had been regenerated. Such persons no longer worried over the status of their own souls because their love for God and the contemplation of his glory made assurance of one's salvation virtually an afterthought.

The theology of disinterested benevolence led Samuel Hopkins, pastor of First Congregational Church in Newport, Rhode Island, to oppose slavery for the good of the enslaved. He wrote several treatises on the subject in the 1770s decades before the abolition movement gained strength in America. Disinterested benevolence also inspired much of the missionary activity of the period, such as the creation of the American Board of Commissioners for Foreign Missions. Many New Divinity ministers and missionaries were inspired by The Life of David Brainerd published by Edwards as an account of the ministry of David Brainerd, a missionary to the Delaware Indians of New Jersey. Brainerd's life was held up as the ideal of disinterested benevolence.

=== Principles ===
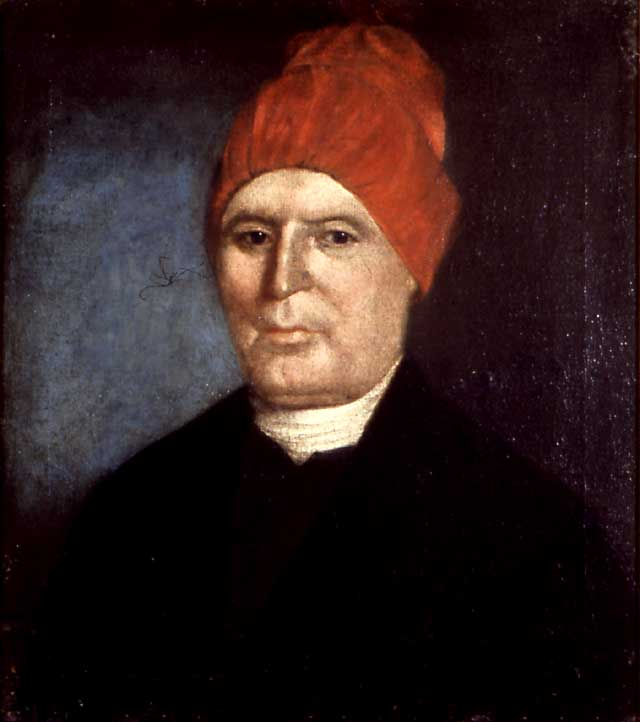
Samuel Hopkins, proponent of New Divinity

The main principles of it are either taught or implied in the writings of Samuel Hopkins. Those principles that are merely implied in the system of Hopkins were unfolded and somewhat modified by his three friends Stephen West, Nathanael Emmons, and Samuel Spring. As logically connected with each other, and as understood by the majority of its advocates, the system contains the following principles:

1. Every moral agent choosing right has the natural power to choose wrong, and choosing wrong has the natural power to choose right.
2. He is under no obligation to perform an act, unless he has the natural ability to perform it.
3. Although in the act of choosing, every man is as free as any moral agent can be, yet he is acted upon while he acts freely, and the divine providence, as well as decree, extends to all his wrong as really as to his right volitions.
4. All sin is so overruled by God as to become the occasion of good to the universe.
5. The holiness and the sinfulness of every moral agent belong to him personally and exclusively, and cannot be imputed in a literal sense to any other agent.
6. As the holiness and the sin of man are exercises of his will, there is neither holiness nor sin in his nature viewed as distinct from these exercises (cf. original sin).
7. As all his moral acts before regeneration are certain to be entirely sinful, no promise of regenerating grace is made to any of them.
8. The impenitent sinner is obligated, and should be exhorted, to cease from all impenitent acts, and to begin a holy life at once. His moral inability to obey this exhortation is not a literal inability (cf. total depravity), but is a mere certainty that while left to himself, he will sin; and this certainty is no reason for his not being required and urged to abstain immediately from all sin.
9. Every impenitent sinner should be willing to suffer the punishment that God wills to inflict upon him. In whatever sense he should submit to the divine justice punishing other sinners, in that sense he should submit to the divine justice punishing himself. In whatever sense the punishment of the finally obdurate promotes the highest good of the universe, in that sense he should be submissive to the divine will in punishing himself, if finally obdurate. This principle is founded mainly on the two following.
10. All holiness consists in the elective preference of the greater above the smaller, and all sin consists in the elective preference of the smaller above the greater, good of sentient beings.
11. All the moral attributes of God are comprehended in general benevolence, that is essentially the same with general justice, and includes simple, complacential, and composite benevolence; legislative, retributive, and public justice.
12. The atonement of Christ consists not in his enduring the punishment threatened by the law (see the satisfaction view of the atonement), nor in his performing the duties required by the law, but in his manifesting and honoring by his pains, and especially by his death, all the divine attributes which would have been manifested in the same and no higher degree by the punishment of the redeemed. (See the governmental view of the atonement.)
13. The atonement was made for all men, the non-elect as really as the elect. (See unlimited atonement.)

== Notable adherents ==
- Joseph Bellamy
- Timothy Dwight IV
- Jonathan Edwards, Jr.
- Nathanael Emmons
- Samuel Hopkins
- Samuel Spring
