= The Justice of God in the Damnation of Sinners =

1734 sermon by Jonathan Edwards

- Author: Jonathan Edwards
- Subject: Theology
- Publication date: 1734
- Publication place: United States

The Justice of God in the Damnation of Sinners is a sermon by American Christian theologian, reformer, author, and pastor, Jonathan Edwards, originally published in 1734, that uses the text of Romans 3:19 as its basis.

== Synopsis ==
The main subject of the doctrinal part of Edwards' sermon is the free grace of God in man's salvation, especially in regards to justification by faith alone. Edwards examines the context of Romans 3:19 in which the Apostle Paul chastises the Jewish people for their literal observance and interpretation of the Law and then proceeds to condemn them for it. Edwards affirms, and then elaborates upon, Paul's original assertion.

== Analysis ==
Edwards preached the sermon during the First Great Awakening (c. 1730–1755) in a series of sermons entitled "Justification by Faith Alone" in 1734. The result of Edwards' preaching was the beginnings of a great revival in Northampton and along the Connecticut River Valley in the winter and spring of 1734-5. During this same period, more than three hundred of Edwards' congregation made professions of faith.

"The Justice of God in the Damnation of Sinners" was preached against the principles of Arminianism, namely the disabling effects of original sin, free will and the tendency to make morality the essence of religion.

== History and impact ==
While not as popular as some of his other works, modern day Calvinists such as John Piper refer to Edwards' teaching often and use his works extensively in their own ministries. When the Jonathan Edwards Center at Yale University opened, Piper was quoted as saying that its opening had "fulfilled a dream I did not expect to see.”

== See also ==
- The Freedom of the Will
- Religious Affections
- "Sinners in the Hands of an Angry God"
