= Sinners in the Hands of an Angry God =

Sermon by Jonathan Edwards (1741)

- Short story by Jonathan Edwards
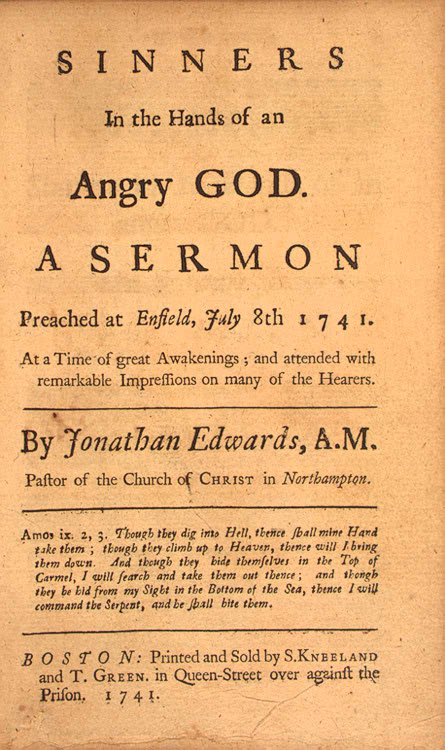
- "Sinners in the Hands of an Angry God. A Sermon Preached at Enfield, Connecticut, July 8th 1741."

Text available at Wikisource
- Country: British Colonies
- Language: English
- Genre: Sermon

Publication
- Publication date: July 8, 1741

"Sinners in the Hands of an Angry God" is a sermon written by the American theologian Jonathan Edwards, preached to his own congregation in Northampton, Massachusetts to profound effect, and again on July 8, 1741, in Enfield, Connecticut. Like Edwards' other works, it combines vivid imagery of sinners' everlasting torment in the burning fires of Hell with observations of the world and citations of Biblical scripture. It is Edwards' most famous written work, and a fitting representation of his preaching style. It is widely studied by Christians and historians, providing a glimpse into the theology of the First Great Awakening of c. 1730–1755.

This was a highly influential sermon of the Great Awakening, emphasizing God's wrath upon unbelievers consigned after death to a very real, horrific, and fiery Hell. The underlying point is that God has given humans a chance to confess their sins. It is the mere will of God, according to Edwards, that keeps wicked men from being overtaken by the devil and his demons and cast into the furnace of Hell – "like greedy hungry lions, that see their prey, and expect to have it, but are for the present kept back [by God's hand]." Mankind's own attempts to avoid falling into the "bottomless gulf" due to the overwhelming "weight and pressure towards hell" are insufficient and have no more effect than "a spider's web would have to stop a falling rock". This act of grace from God has given humans a chance to believe and trust in Christ. Edwards provides much varied and vivid imagery to illustrate this main theme throughout.

== Doctrine ==
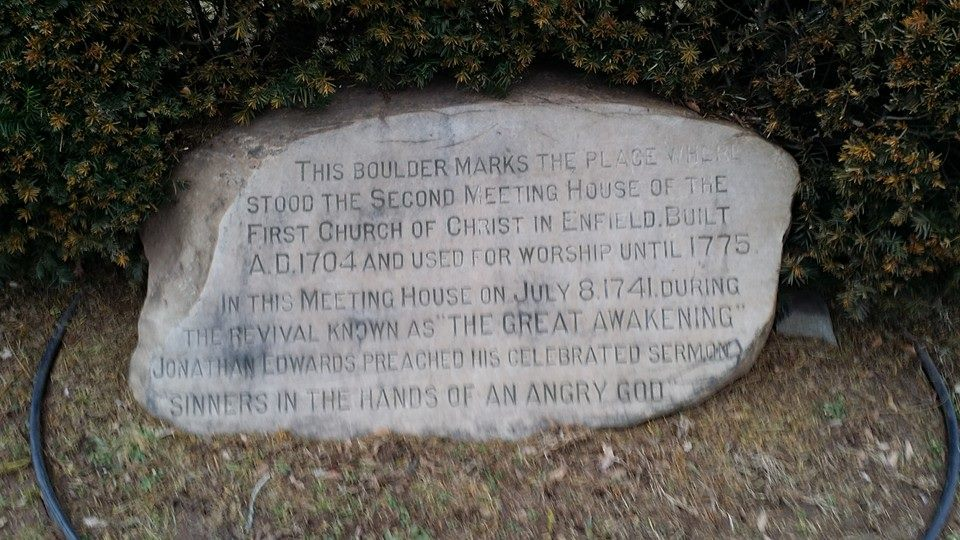
A monument in Enfield, Connecticut commemorating the location where the sermon was preached

Most of the sermon's text consists of ten "considerations":

1. God may cast wicked men into Hell at any given moment.
2. The wicked deserve to be cast into Hell. Divine justice does not prevent God from destroying the wicked at any moment.
3. The wicked, at this moment, suffer under God's condemnation to Hell.
4. The wicked, on earth—at this very moment—suffer a sample of the torments of Hell. The wicked must not think, simply because they are not physically in Hell, that God (in whose hand the wicked now reside) is not—at this very moment—as angry with them as he is with those he is now tormenting in Hell, and who—at this very moment—feel and bear the fierceness of his wrath.
5. At any moment God shall permit him, Satan stands ready to fall upon the wicked and seize them as his own.
6. If it were not for God's restraints, there are, in the souls of wicked men, hellish principles reigning which, presently, would kindle and flame out into hellfire.
7. Simply because there are not visible means of death before them at any given moment, the wicked should not feel secure.
8. Simply because it is natural to care for oneself or to think that others may care for them, men should not think themselves safe from God's wrath.
9. All that wicked men may do to save themselves from Hell's pains shall afford them nothing if they continue to reject Christ.
10. God has never promised to save mankind from Hell, except for those contained in Christ through the covenant of Grace.

== Purpose ==
One church in Enfield, Connecticut, had been largely unaffected during the First Great Awakening of New England. Edwards was invited by the pastor of the church to preach to them. Edwards's aim was to teach his listeners about the horrors of Hell, the dangers of sin, and the terrors of being lost. Edwards described the position of those who do not follow Christ's urgent call to receive forgiveness. Edwards scholar John E. Smith notes that despite the apparent pessimism of the notion of an angry God, that pessimism is "overcome by the comforting hope of salvation through a triumphant, loving savior." Whenever Edwards preached terror, it was part of a larger campaign to turn sinners from their disastrous path and to the rightful object of their affections, Jesus.

== Application ==
In the final section of "Sinners in the Hands of an Angry God," Edwards shows that his theological argument holds throughout scripture and biblical history. He invokes stories and examples throughout the Bible. Edwards ends the sermon with one final appeal: "Therefore let everyone that is out of Christ, now awake and fly from the wrath to come." According to Edwards and the Bible, only by returning to Christ can one escape the stark fate he outlines.

== Effect and legacy ==
Reverend Stephen Williams was in attendance at the Enfield sermon, and would describe it in his diary as "a most awakening sermon". As for the congregation's reaction, he recalled that:

[B]efore the sermon was done there was a great moaning and crying out through the whole house — "What shall I do to be saved?" "Oh, I am going to hell!" "Oh what shall I do for a Christ?" and so forth — so that the minister was obliged to desist. [The] shrieks and cries were piercing and amazing. After some time of waiting, the congregation were still, so that a prayer was made by Mr. Wheelock, and after that we descended from the pulpit and discoursed with the people, some in one place and some in another. And amazing and astonishing: the power [of] God was seen and several souls were hopefully wrought upon that night, and oh the cheerfulness and pleasantness of their countenances that received comfort. Oh that God would strengthen and confirm [their new faith]! We sang a hymn and prayed, and dispersed the assembly.

Although the sermon has received criticism, Edwards' words have endured and are still read to this day. Edwards' sermon continues to be the leading example of a First Great Awakening sermon and is still used in religious and academic studies.

Since the 1950s, a number of critical perspectives were used to analyze the sermon. The first comprehensive academic analysis of "Sinners in the Hands of an Angry God" was published by Edwin Cady in 1949, who comments on the imagery of the sermon and distinguishes between the "cliché" and "fresh" figurative images, stressing how the former related to colonial life. Lee Stuart questions that the message of the sermon was solely negative and attributes its success to the final passages in which the sinners are actually "comforted". Rosemary Hearn argues that it is the logical structure of the sermon that constitutes its most important persuasive element. Lemay looks into the changes in the syntactic categories, like grammatical tenses, in the text of the sermon. Lukasik stresses how, in the sermon, Edwards appropriates Newtonian physics, especially the image of the gravitational pull that would relentlessly bring down the sinners. Gallagher focuses on the "beat" of the sermon, and on how the consecutive structural elements of the sermon serve different persuasive aims. Choiński suggests that the rhetorical success of the sermon consists in the use of the "deictic shift" that transported the hearers mentally into the figurative images of hell.

Jonathan Edwards also wrote and spoke a great deal on heaven and angels, writes John Gerstner in Jonathan Edwards on Heaven and Hell, 1991, and those themes are less remembered, namely "Heaven is a World of Love".

== See also ==
- American philosophy
- Calvinism
- A Faithful Narrative
- The Freedom of the Will
- Great Awakening, generally, the term used for three or four distinct periods of religious revival in American Christian history
- The Justice of God in the Damnation of Sinners
- Puritans
- Redemption
- Religious Affections
