= The Nature of True Virtue =

1765 sermon by Jonathan Edwards

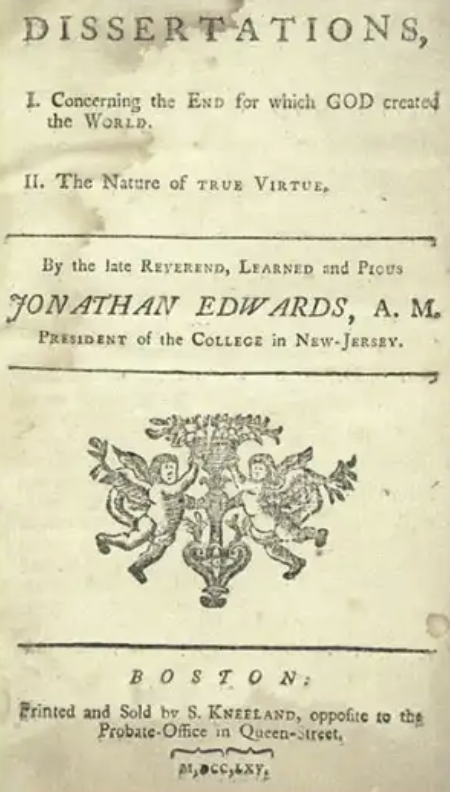
- Title page for A Dissertation Concerning the Nature of True Virtue (1765)
- Author: Jonathan Edwards
- Subject: Theology
- Publication date: 1765
- Publication place: United States

A Dissertation Concerning the Nature of True Virtue is a work by American Christian reformer, theologian, author and pastor Jonathan Edwards originally published posthumously in 1765. The work was published jointly with A Dissertation Concerning the End for Which God Created the World.

== Synopsis ==
In Virtue, Edwards describes his views on the different levels of virtue, specifically "common morality" and "true (saving) virtue." God, Edwards argues, had in mind as the end for his creation of the world His own glory and not human happiness. Thus, true virtue does not arise from self-love or from any earth-bound selflessness (these were two common views at the time) but from a desire to see God's glory displayed above all. Love of self, family, or nation is good only to the extent that it magnifies the glory of God.

== History and impact ==
The Nature of True Virtue, and its companion work, A Dissertation Concerning the End for Which God Created the World, are still popular works today. Modern theologian John Piper, who extensively studied the works of Edwards while at seminary, credits the work with awakening in him "a deep longing to be a good man."

== See also ==
- The Freedom of the Will
- Religious Affections
