= A Dissertation Concerning the End for Which God Created the World =

18th-century work by Jonathan Edwards

Concerning The End for Which God Created the World
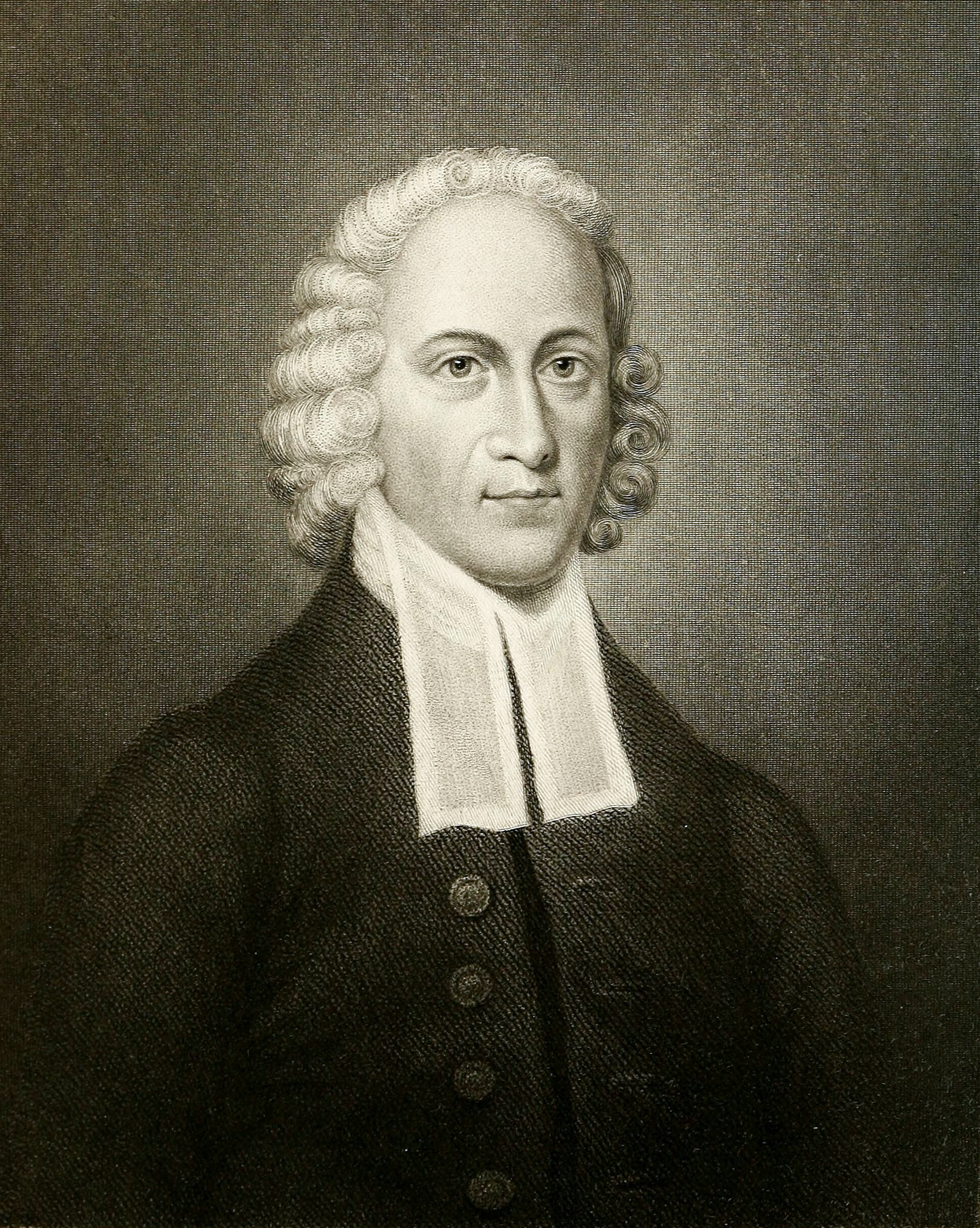
- Engraving of Jonathan Edwards before 1755
- Author: Jonathan Edwards
- Language: English
- Subject: Theology
- Publisher: Samuel Kneeland (Boston)
- Publication date: 1765
- Publication place: United States

A Dissertation Concerning the End for Which God Created the World is a work by Christian theologian, reformer, author, and pastor Jonathan Edwards (1703–1758) that was started in the mid-1750s but not finally published until 1765, several years following Edwards' death.

This dissertation was published concurrently with The Nature of True Virtue. The two works have much in common, specifically the assertion that God's aim in creating the world was not human happiness, but his own glory.

== Synopsis ==
Edwards argues against contemporaries who claimed that human happiness was the end for which God created the world. Edwards instead puts forth the idea that the reason for God's creation of the world was not human happiness, but the magnification of his own glory and name. Edwards then argues that since true happiness comes from God alone, human happiness is an extension of God's glory. Indeed, Edwards maintains, all God's "ultimate" ends and "chief" ends serve to magnify his glory as well. As in Virtue, Edwards discusses the claim that there is no true happiness unless it is happiness in God.

== History and impact ==
Modern day evangelicals such as John Piper still use Edwards' works today in their own congregations. In his book God's Passion for His Glory, which includes the complete text of The End for Which God Created the World as the second half of the book, Piper argues that the longer he lives "the more clearly I see my dependence on those who have gone before," that "Edwards's relentless God-centeredness and devotion to the Biblical contours of doctrine are profoundly needed in our day," and that Edwards is in "a class by himself in American history, perhaps in the history of Christendom."

== See also ==
- The Nature of True Virtue
- Religious Affections
