= Joseph Bellamy =

American pastor, author and educator (1719–1790)

Joseph Bellamy (20 February 1719 – 6 March 1790) was an American Congregationalist pastor and a leading preacher, author, educator and theologian in New England in the second half of the 18th century. He was a disciple of Jonathan Edwards, and along with Samuel Hopkins, Timothy Dwight IV, Nathaniel William Taylor, and Jonathan Edward Jr., one of the "Architects of the New Divinity", a branch of the New Light movement that came out of the Great Awakening. A proponent of education for both clergy and laity, for a half century out of his rural Bethlehem, Connecticut church he trained fifty ministers, and founded what was possibly the first American Sabbath or Sunday school.

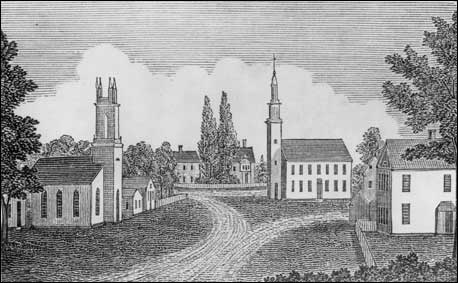
View of the center of Bethlehem by John Warner Barber (published 1836, 46 years after Bellamy's death) "Bellamy's house is the one to the right of the two trees in the center of the drawing and to the left of the Congregational Church."

== Life ==
Born in Cheshire, Connecticut as the son of Matthew Bellamy and his wife Sarah Wood, he graduated from Yale in 1735 and studied theology for a time under Jonathan Edwards in Northampton, Massachusetts. He was licensed to preach when scarcely eighteen years old, and from 1740 until his death was pastor of the Congregational church at Bethlehem, Connecticut.

Of his 22 books, the best known was True Religion Delineated (1750), which won for him a high reputation as a theologian and was reprinted several times both in England and America. Despite the fact that with the exception of the period of the Great Awakening, when he preached as an itinerant in several neighboring colonies, his active labors were confined to his own parish, his influence on the religious thought of his time in America was probably surpassed only by that of his old friend and teacher Jonathan Edwards.

This influence was due not only to his publications, but also to the school or classes for the training of clergymen which he conducted for many years at his home and from which went forth scores of preachers to every part of New England and the middle colonies.

In Western Connecticut, Old Light Congregationalism was more popular than New Light, and Bellamy faced opposition from many of his fellow ministers in the area. One minister, Gideon Hawley, wrote to Bellamy in 1763, asserting, "I don't know of but two clergymen however in the country that appear to like your principles."

Bellamy's system of divinity was in general similar to that of Edwards. During the American War of Independence he was loyal to the American cause. The University of Aberdeen conferred upon him the honorary degree of D.D. in 1768. He was a powerful and dramatic preacher.

Bellamy married as his first wife Frances Sherman of New Haven, Connecticut, by whom he had eight children, including David Bellamy, a prominent local merchant and Connecticut legislator. After her death in 1785, Rev. Joseph Bellamy married in 1786 as his second wife Abiah (Burbank) Leavitt Storrs, who had previously been married to Rev. Freegrace Leavitt and Rev. Andrew Storrs. On November 19, 1786, he suffered a debilitating stroke that ended his career. Bellamy lingered for more than three years, finally dying on March 6, 1790.

Joseph Bellamy's son David married Silence Leavitt, daughter of another prominent local merchant and legislator, David Leavitt.

Sibylla Bailey Crane (1851-1902), a descendant of Bellamy, was an educator, composer, and author.

== Estimations of Bellamy ==
The day Bellamy died, the Reverend Ezra Stiles, an Old Light minister and a longtime critic of Bellamy, gave this negative assessment of the man:

He was of a haughty domineering temper and until of late years uncensorious of his brethren in the ministry and others who opposed him ... he was ... of a dogmatical and overbearing disposition ... his numerous noisy writings have blazed their day, and one generation more will put them to sleep.

According to an article in the Boston Evening Transcript in 1935, Bellamy contributed quite a lot to the town of Bethlehem:

Dr. Bellamy not only named the town, but he virtually founded it, guided it through its first early years, became its wealthiest resident, owned the biggest house in it, put the town on the map through his own reputation as a scholar and a divine [devoted to God], attracted many theological students to it who spent money on board and room, and left it at his death a well established and flourishing community.

== Bibliography ==
- True Religion Delineated (1750)
- The Wisdom of God in the Permission of Sin (1758), his most characteristic work
- Theron, Paulinus and Aspasio; or Letters and Dialogues upon tile Nature of Love to God, Faith in Christ, and Assurance of a Title to Eternal Life (1759)
- The Nature and Glory of the Gospel (1762)
- A Blow at the Root of Antinomianism (1763)
- There is but One Covenant (1769)
- Four Dialogues on the Half-Way Covenant (1769)
- A Careful and Strict Examination of the External Covenant (1769).
- "The Millennium : or the thousand years of prosperity, promised to the Church of God, in the Old Testament and in the New, shortly to commence, and to be carried on to perfection, under the auspices of Him, who in the vision, was presented to St. John" (1794).

His collected Works were published in 3 vols. (New York, 1811-1812), and were republished with a Memoir by Rev. Tryon Edwards (2 vols., Boston, 1850).

== Citations ==
Attribution:
