= Nathaniel William Taylor =

American Reformed theologian (1786–1858)

Nathaniel W. Taylor
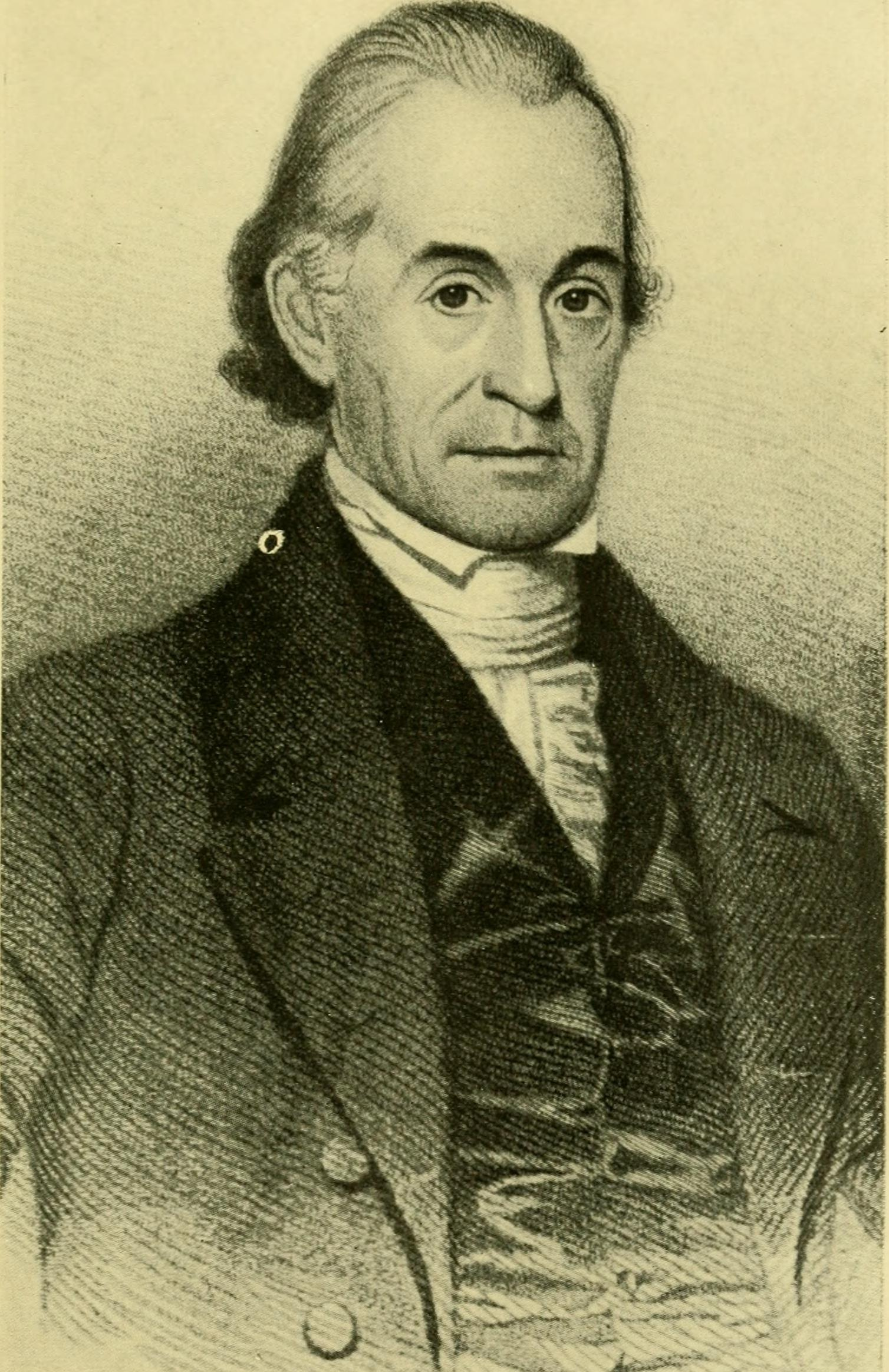
- Lithograph of Taylor
- Born: June 23, 1786; New Milford, Connecticut
- Died: March 10, 1858 (aged 71); New Haven, Connecticut
- Resting place: Grove Street Cemetery
- Education: Yale College
- Occupations: Theologian, professor
- Known for: New Haven theology

Nathaniel William Taylor (June 23, 1786 – March 10, 1858) was an influential Protestant Theologian of the early 19th century, whose major contribution to the Christian faith (and to American religious history), known as the New Haven theology or Taylorism, was to line up historical Calvinism with the religious revivalism of the time (The Second Great Awakening). A graduate of Yale College, he returned to found the school's first independent division, the Theological Department, an institution which later became the Yale Divinity School.

== Biography ==
Born in 1786 to a rich and religious family in Connecticut, Taylor entered Yale College when only 14 (1800) but could not graduate until 1807 because of an eye problem. He was a son of Nathaniel and Anna (née Northrup) Taylor. While studying there, Taylor was heavily influenced by the revivalist president of Yale, Timothy Dwight (grandson of Jonathan Edwards). In the years after his graduation, Taylor studied theology, worked as Dwight's secretary, and, after ordination, became the minister of the First Church of New Haven in 1812.

== Influence on Calvinist theology during the Second Great Awakening ==
While Taylor himself was not an evangelist, his sympathy for revivalism during a time when revivals were breaking out ensured that he had a major influence upon the core beliefs of revivalists and the churches that were created from them.

The Second Great Awakening, despite its scope and power, was opposed by the more established church, especially Episcopalians and "Old Calvinists", but also the growing Unitarian movement. After Taylor had been appointed Professor of Didactic Theology at Yale in 1822, he used his influence to publicly support the revivalist movement and defend its beliefs and practices against opponents.

=== Influence on Calvinistic doctrines ===
From his position at Yale, Taylor repudiated Calvinistic Determinism - the idea that the works of God alone are responsible for all activities in the universe. He did this to preserve the ideal of human freedom, mainly because he believed that determinism contradicted freedom and was thus immoral. Since God could not be immoral, then Determinism could not be possible for a loving, perfect Deity.

The repudiation of determinism was followed by further changes to Calvinistic doctrines such as Revelation, Human Depravity, God's Sovereignty, Christ's Atonement and Regeneration. Both Taylor and Dwight are credited with the creation of "New Haven Theology", which appealed to both Congregationalists and New School Presbyterians and who found traditional Calvinism difficult to embrace.

Naturally, both Taylor and New Haven Theology were vigorously opposed by Old Calvinists, especially Charles Hodge from Princeton Seminary. Taylor's modification of Calvinism not only drew their ire, but prompted many of them to declare that Taylor's system was not Calvinism at all, but Arminian and even Pelagian.

=== Influence on Charles Finney ===
Taylor's influence is important when examining the ministry of Charles Grandison Finney, arguably, the best known evangelist during the Second Great Awakening. While it would certainly not be accurate to say that "Taylor's theology was preached in Finney's ministry", both men came to prominence at about the same time and a comparison of the written works of both men shows much in common, especially in the areas that differed with "Old Calvinism". Much of Taylor's theology (described below) is similar to that preached by Finney.

Taylor, however, was never a proponent of "perfectionism" - the belief that it was possible (and therefore desirable) for Christians to live a sinless and obedient life. While Finney's influence in revivalism was important, it was Taylor and the New Haven theology that prevailed in New England churches.

=== A Summary of Taylor's Theology ===
Original Sin: All men are lost but Adam's sin was not imputed to anyone, nor is depravity defined by a physical flaw within human nature. Although a person will sin with certainty, sin is the act of free choice. A sinner is therefore morally responsible for their own sin rather than being physically enslaved by the sin of Adam.

God's Sovereignty: God does not determine the destiny of all men through election, nor does he determine the events of our world. Instead he has created a moral universe and will judge its inhabitants. "God promotes moral action by a system of means and ends in which man can respond to ethical appeals for repentance." (Hoffecker)

The Atonement: Taylor repudiated the view that Christ died upon the cross as a direct sin sacrifice for the sins of Christians. Instead, he taught that Christ's death is the means by which God can urge sinners to freely turn from their sin and be converted, especially when presented with the benefits and privileges that a godly life can bestow upon them.

A note on "Self Love" - the term used by Taylor to denote a natural part of man's being, whereby a person has a natural desire for happiness that motivates all choices and which will manifest itself in Godly repentance when given the opportunity. This is based on the belief that the Christian life, if understood, would be so attractive, wonderful and beneficial for the person that his or her natural inclination would be to convert, something within his or her power to do according to this theology.

=== "Old Calvinist" objections to Taylor's teachings ===
Hodge and others felt that Taylor's teachings were so seriously wrong that they were not so much Arminian, but Pelagian in character. In practical terms, traditional Calvinists have not only rejected Taylor's teachings as erroneous, but also heretical. Even today, many Calvinists, when confronted with Taylor's teachings, will conclude that he had departed from the true Christian faith. Those who held to Taylor's beliefs, including, most notably, Charles Finney, were similarly heterodox.

Taylor's New England Theology was put on trial in Albert Barnes and Lyman Beecher, who were both accused of heresy by Old School Calvinists. Albert Barnes was acquitted of heresy charges and found orthodox by the Synod of Philadelphia. Lyman Beecher was acquitted of heresy charges and found orthodox by the Synod of Cincinnati. Thus, Taylor's New Haven Theology, New School Theology, or New Divinity was declared an orthodox Christian theology.

At the heart of this objection is Taylor's view of the atonement. Many Christians believe that Christ's death upon the cross was as a sin-substitute, whereby the sins of mankind were imputed to Christ, who was punished for our sins in our place. Martin Luther went as far as to say that Christ became the worst sinner in the universe. Christ's righteousness, or his perfection, was then imputed to all believers. Consequently, God no longer sees believers as they really are but is blinded by imputed righteousness. For many Christians, this belief is the cornerstone of the Christian faith. Yet Taylor explicitly denied this view.

=== Taylorism versus Tylerism ===
Within the Congregational church at the time, a theological split occurred between those who advocated New Haven theology and those who adhered to more conservative beliefs. Bennet Tyler led this split against Taylor and set up The East Windsor Theological Seminary in opposition to the New Haven theology espoused by Taylor at Yale. Though less in disagreement with the teachings of Samuel Hopkins, Tylerism was vigorously opposed to what were perceived to be serious errors in New Haven thinking.

At the time, such objections to Taylor's theology were considered an attack upon a part of the revivalist movement. Thus the "enemy" of revivalism was understood to be the established churches, especially those that embraced and taught strict Calvinism. It was perhaps this situation that led to many revivalist movements (and later Fundamentalist and Evangelical movements) being separated from confessional and Calvinist churches—thus solidifying Arminian belief.

=== Taylor and the decline of New England Congregationalism ===
It has been argued by Angus Steward that the New Haven theology advocated by Taylor (and others) led to the New England Congregational churches being more open and amenable to the theological liberalism that influenced many mainline denominations in the late 19th century, an influence that is still being felt today.

While this may seem a harsh judgment—especially considering Taylor's support of revivalism and the ensuing "conversion" experience that accompanies it—Steward maintains that Taylor and other proponents of New Haven theology deliberately abandoned teachings that were, up to that time, considered an essential part of traditional Calvinist Theology; by questioning and abandoning these beliefs, a historical precedent was made which allowed future generations to be more influenced by teachings which went further in denying other Calvinist teachings.

As mainline Protestant denominations that have been historically dominated by Liberal Christianity have declined in number and influence over time, Steward holds that New England Congregationalism suffered the same fate: Influenced by Taylor's rejection of "Old Calvinism" and embracing Liberal theology, with, unlike in the Southern Baptist Convention, no Fundamentalist reaction, one of America's most historically significant church groups is thus no longer a dominant force in American Christianity.

== Sources ==
- Some of this article has been based upon W. A. Hoffecker, "Taylor, Nathaniel William", in W. A. Elwell (ed). Evangelical Dictionary of Theology, Grand Rapids, Baker, 1990.
