= The Jonathan Edwards Center at Yale University =

The Jonathan Edwards Center at Yale University (also known as the Jonathan Edwards Centre) is a department of the Yale University Divinity School responsible for publishing and providing scholarly information about the works of Jonathan Edwards (1703–1758), a 1720 Yale graduate, Christian theologian, and philosopher who played a significant role in America's First Great Awakening in the 18th century.

The Jonathan Edwards Center contains many of Edwards' original manuscripts, acquired from his family in the early twentieth century. Besides its primary location at Yale University in New Haven, Connecticut, the center maintains affiliated centers in Australia, Benelux, Brazil, Poland, Germany, and South Africa to assist in providing information about the works of Jonathan Edwards. Edwards was a prolific writer and the center has published twenty-six volumes (letter press) and seventy-three volumes (digital edition, online archive) of his works. The center also makes Edwards' works available on the web through an online archive.

== See also ==
- Jonathan Edwards
- Yale Divinity School
