= The Life of David Brainerd =

- Author: Jonathan Edwards
- Subject: Theology, biography
- Publication date: 1749
- Publication place: United States

The Life of David Brainerd, also called The Life and Diary of David Brainerd, is a biography of David Brainerd by evangelical theologian Jonathan Edwards, first published in 1749 under the title "An Account of the Life of the Late Rev. David Brainerd".

== Contents ==
David Brainerd was an early 18th century American missionary to the Native Americans who had a particularly fruitful ministry among the Delaware Indians of New Jersey. The work was taken from Brainerd's own diary, but was substantially changed by Edwards in order to better present an example of a man who countered the Arminian viewpoint.

== Impact ==
The work was a major influence on the domestic and foreign missionary movement of the eighteenth and nineteenth centuries, and has been the most frequently reprinted book by Edwards.
