= Harry S. Stout =

American historian of religion

Harry S. Stout is an American historian of religion, who is currently the Jonathan Edwards Professor of American Christianity at Yale Divinity School. He is the editor of the 27 volume series The Works of Jonathan Edwards and the co-editor with Jon Butler of the 17-volume Religion and American Life series, which is aimed at high school students. He is the recipient of a National Endowment for the Humanities Research Fellowship and a Guggenheim Foundation Fellowship.

Stout received a B.A. from Calvin College, and an M.A. and Ph.D. from Kent State University.

== Works ==
=== Author ===
- (1986) The New England Soul, Preaching and Religious Culture in Colonial New England. New York: Oxford University Press. ISBN 978-0-19-503958-0
  - nomination: Pulitzer Prize for History
- (1991) The Divine Dramatist: George Whitefield and the Rise of Modern Evangelicalism. Grand Rapids, Michigan: William B. Eerdmans. ISBN 978-0-80-280154-8
  - Critic's Award for History 1991
  - nomination: Pulitzer Prize for Biography
- (2006) Upon the Altar of the Nation: A Moral History of the Civil War. New York: Viking Books. finalist: ISBN 978-0-67-003470-3
  - winner: Christianity Today Best History Book 2007
  - winner: Philip Schaff Prize for Best Book on the History of Christianity 2006-7
  - winner: New England Historical Association Best Book Award 2007
  - finalist: Lincoln Prize
- (2017) American Aristocrats: A Family, a Fortune, and the Making of American Capitalism. New York: Basic Books. ISBN 978-0-46-509898-9

=== Collaborations ===
- with Deborah H. Deford (1987) An Enemy Among Them. Boston: Clarion Books. ISBN 978-0-39-570108-9

=== Contributor ===
- et al. (2005) Jonathan Edwards at 300: Essays on the Tercentenary of His Birth. Lanham, Maryland: University Press of America. ISBN 978-0-76-183227-0

=== Editor ===
- (2017) The Jonathan Edwards Encyclopedia (27 volumes). Grand Rapids, Michigan: Eerdmans ISBN 978-0-80-286952-4

=== Co-editor ===
- co-editor with Nathan O. Hatch (1988) Jonathan Edwards and the American Experience. New York: Oxford University Press. ISBN 9780195051186
- co-editor with Daniel G. Reid, Robert D. Linder, and Bruce L. Shelley (1990) Dictionary of Christianity in America. Westmont, Illinois: Intervarsity Press. ISBN 9780830817764
  - Christianity Today Book of the Year Award 1990
- co-editor with Barbara B. Oberg (1993) Benjamin Franklin, Jonathan Edwards, and The Representation of American Culture. New York: Oxford University Press. ISBN 9780195077759
- co-editor with John F. Smith and Kenneth P. Minkema (1995) A Jonathan Edwards Reader. New Haven: Yale University Press. ISBN 9780300062045
- co-editor with D. G. Hart (1997) New Directions in American Religious History. New York: Oxford University Press. ISBN 9780195104134
- co-editor with Jon Butler (1997) Religion in American History: A Reader. New York: Oxford University Press. ISBN 978-0-19-509776-4
- co-editor with Randall M. Miller and Charles Reagan Wilson (1998) Religion and the American Civil War. New York: Oxford University Press. ISBN 9780195121292
