= Hannah Heaton =

American diarist & farmer (1721–1794)

- Born: 1721; Southampton, NY
- Died: 1794
- Spouse: Theophilus Heaton Jr

Hannah Heaton was a New England woman known for chronicling in a diary her experiences during the Great Awakening in the northern American royal colonies.

== Autobiography ==
It is unclear when Heaton began her diary/autobiography, as the first few dozen pages are undated. These undated pages include a visit to Connecticut where she experienced religious conversion. The diary has entries over a period of 40 years, from the Great Awakening through to the American Revolution. Her autobiography has been of interest to historians as it chronicles the life of a mother and farmer during the Great Awakening.
