= Samuel Hopkins (theologian) =

American theologian

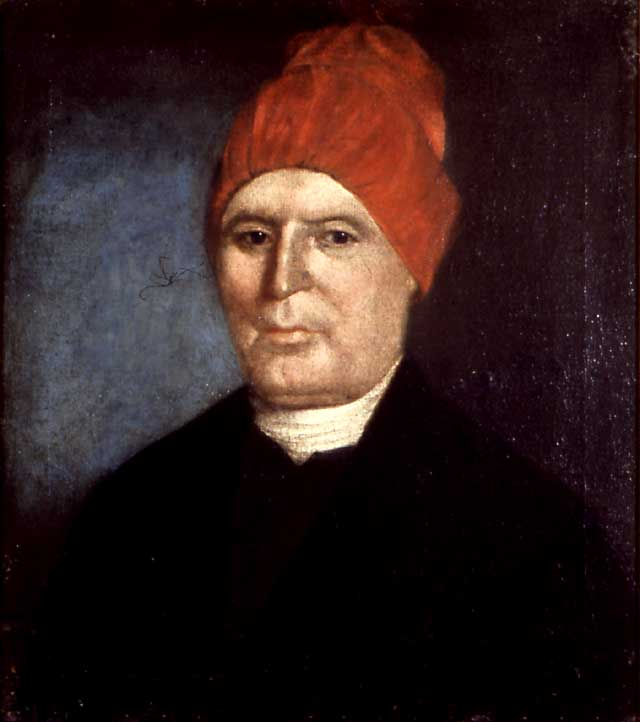
- Portrait of Hopkins
- Born: September 17, 1721; Waterbury, Connecticut, British America (now Waterbury, Connecticut, U.S.)
- Died: December 20, 1803 (aged 82); Newport, Rhode Island
- Occupations: Theologian, abolitionist

Samuel Hopkins (September 17, 1721 – December 20, 1803) was an American Congregationalist theologian of the late colonial era of the United States. Hopkinsian theology was named for him. Hopkins was an early abolitionist, saying that it was in the interest and duty of the U.S. to set free all of their slaves. He made efforts to recruit African-Americans for purposes of serving as missionaries in Africa.

== Early life and education ==
Samuel Hopkins (the younger) was born in 1721 in Waterbury, Connecticut, and was named after his paternal uncle, Samuel Hopkins (1693–1755), a minister in the church in West Springfield, Massachusetts. Hopkins graduated from Yale College in 1741, then studied divinity in Northampton, Massachusetts with Jonathan Edwards. He was licensed to preach in 1742.

== Overview of career ==
In December 1743 Hopkins was called and ordained as pastor of the North Parish of Sheffield (now Great Barrington) in Housatonic, Massachusetts. This small settlement had only 30 families; he served here from 1743 to 1769. Hopkins' theological views over these decades generated opposition, and he was eventually dismissed from the pastorate, as the congregation would not commit to fund his position.

From April 1770 until his death in 1803, Hopkins preached at the First Congregational Church in Newport, Rhode Island. While the British occupied Newport from 1776–1780 during the American Revolutionary War, Hopkins preached at Newburyport, Massachusetts, and Canterbury and Stamford, Connecticut.

Hopkins received a Doctor of Divinity from Yale in 1742.

He died in Newport on December 20, 1803.

== Career ==
=== Theological contributions ===
Hopkins, Jonathan Edwards and Joseph Bellamy together created, perhaps unintentionally, the theological scheme that sometimes bears Hopkins name, i.e. Hopkinsian, but is also known as the New Divinity, New School Theology, New England Theology or Edwardseanism. This religious system is a form of Calvinism, which later adherents called "consistent Calvinism." Their view was developed as a distinct theology that dominated religious thought in New England, which was predominately Calvinist. This theological movement was important in the Second Great Awakening. It was opposed generally by the theologians of Princeton, including Charles Hodge. Hopkins is credited with originating the phrase "disinterested benevolence", though the concept is much older. It was expressed by Jonathan Edwards in his ethical writings as well.

=== Abolitionist advocacy ===
Hopkins held some domestic slaves, as did others in New England. But he was one of the first Congregationalist ministers to denounce the institution of slavery. Preachers and members of the Congregationalist Church were the first religious group in America to withdraw from the slave trade. The Quakers of America were the first to condemn the idea of active church members owning slaves, but Hopkins' church was the first to openly preach against the enslavement of Africans and African Americans.

In this period, Rhode Island passed a law in 1774 prohibiting the importation of slaves into the colony. Hopkins published a pamphlet entitled, "A Dialogue Concerning the Slavery of the Africans" (1776), which was addressed "To the Honorable Members of the Continental Congress, Representatives of the Thirteen United American Colonies". Hopkins referred to slaves as "our brethren and children" and stated that it was the duty of the U.S. and in its interest to free them.

In 1784, after the Revolution, the new state of Rhode Island passed a law granting freedom to all children born to slave mothers after March 1785. Following this, Hopkins proposed sending a small colony of African Americans to Africa for the purpose of evangelisation of the natives there. He had already established a school in Rhode Island for Negro missionaries. During the American Revolutionary War, this school was broken up due to wartime confusion. Paul Cuffee, an African-American shipping magnate, was later inspired by Hopkins's thought to pursue colonization by African Americans of Sherbro Island, near the coast of Sierra Leone, a future colony of Great Britain.

Harriet Beecher Stowe so admired Hopkins that she portrayed him as one of the protagonists of her third historical novel The Minister's Wooing (1859).

== Publications ==
Hopkins' publications include:

- To the Public. There Has Been a Design Formed … to Send the Gospel to Guinea (1776, with Ezra Stiles)
- A Dialogue concerning the Slavery of the Africans, showing it to be the Duty and Interest of the American States to emancipate all their African Slaves (1776)
- A Discourse upon the Slave Trade and the History of the Africans (1793)
- A System of Doctrines Contained in Divine Revelation, Explained and Defended (1793)
- Life and Character of Jonathan Edwards (1799)
