= Jonathan Edwards (theologian) =

American preacher and philosopher (1703–1758)

The Reverend Jonathan Edwards
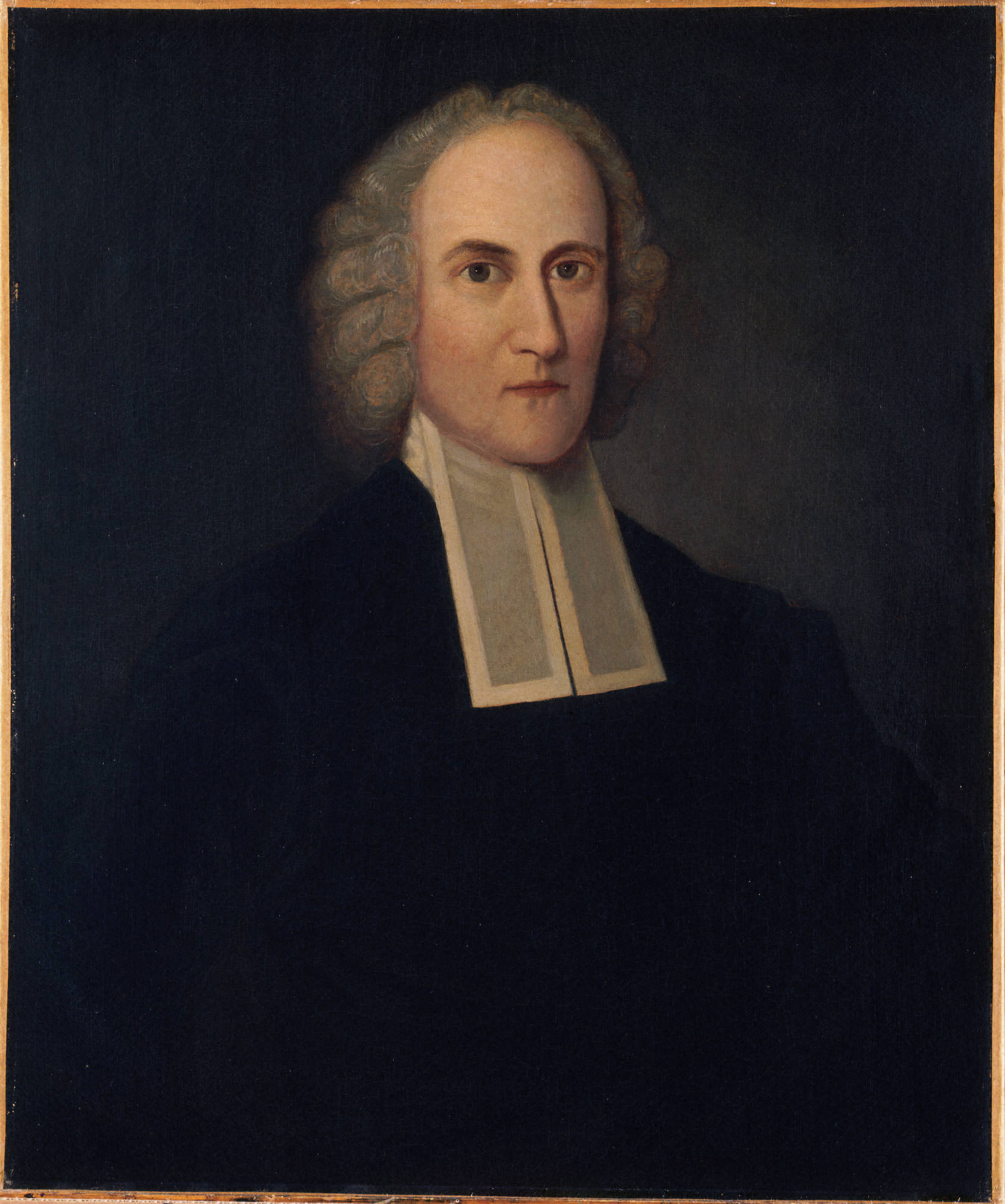
- Portrait by Henry Augustus Loop after Joseph Badger, c. 1860

3rd President of Princeton University
- In office 1758–1758
- Preceded by: Aaron Burr Sr.
- Succeeded by: Jacob Green (acting)

Personal details
- Born: October 5, 1703 East Windsor, Connecticut, British America
- Died: March 22, 1758 (aged 54) Princeton, New Jersey, British America
- Spouse: Sarah Pierpont (m. 1727)
- Children: 11, including Esther, Jonathan, and Pierpont
- Relatives: Elizabeth Tuttle (grandmother); Eunice Williams (cousin)
- Education: Yale College
- Occupation: Pastor, theologian, missionary
- Theology career
- Notable work: "Sinners in the Hands of an Angry God" (1741); Religious Affections (1746)
- Theological work
- Era: Colonial period
- Tradition or movement: Evangelical Calvinist (Puritan); New England theology
- Main interests: Revivalism

Jonathan Edwards (October 5, 1703 – March 22, 1758) was an American revivalist preacher, philosopher, and Congregationalist theologian. Edwards is widely regarded as one of America's most important and original philosophical theologians.

Edwards's theological work is broad in scope but rooted in the Puritan heritage as exemplified in the Westminster and Savoy Confessions of Faith. Recent studies have emphasized how thoroughly Edwards grounded his life's work on conceptions of beauty, harmony, and ethical aptness, and how central the Age of Enlightenment was to his mindset. Edwards played a critical role in shaping the First Great Awakening and oversaw some of the first revivals in 1733–35 at his church in Northampton, Massachusetts. His work gave rise to a doctrine known as New England theology.

At a 1741 revival in Enfield, Connecticut, Edwards delivered the sermon "Sinners in the Hands of an Angry God", a classic of early American literature, following George Whitefield's tour of the Thirteen Colonies. Edwards is well known for his many books, such as A Dissertation Concerning the End for Which God Created the World and The Life of David Brainerd, which inspired thousands of missionaries throughout the 19th century, and Religious Affections which many Calvinist Evangelicals still read today. Edwards died from a smallpox inoculation shortly after beginning the presidency at the College of New Jersey in Princeton.

== Biography ==
=== Early life ===
Jonathan Edwards was born on October 5, 1703, the fifth of 11 children and only son of Timothy Edwards, a minister at East Windsor, Connecticut (modern-day South Windsor), who supplemented his salary by tutoring boys for college. His mother, Esther Stoddard, daughter of Solomon Stoddard of Northampton, Massachusetts, seems to have been a woman of unusual mental gifts and independence of character. Timothy Edwards owned at least one slave, a black man named Ansars. Jonathan was prepared for college by his father and elder sisters, all of whom received an excellent education. His sister Esther, the eldest, wrote a semi-humorous tract on the immateriality of the soul, which has often been mistakenly attributed to Jonathan.

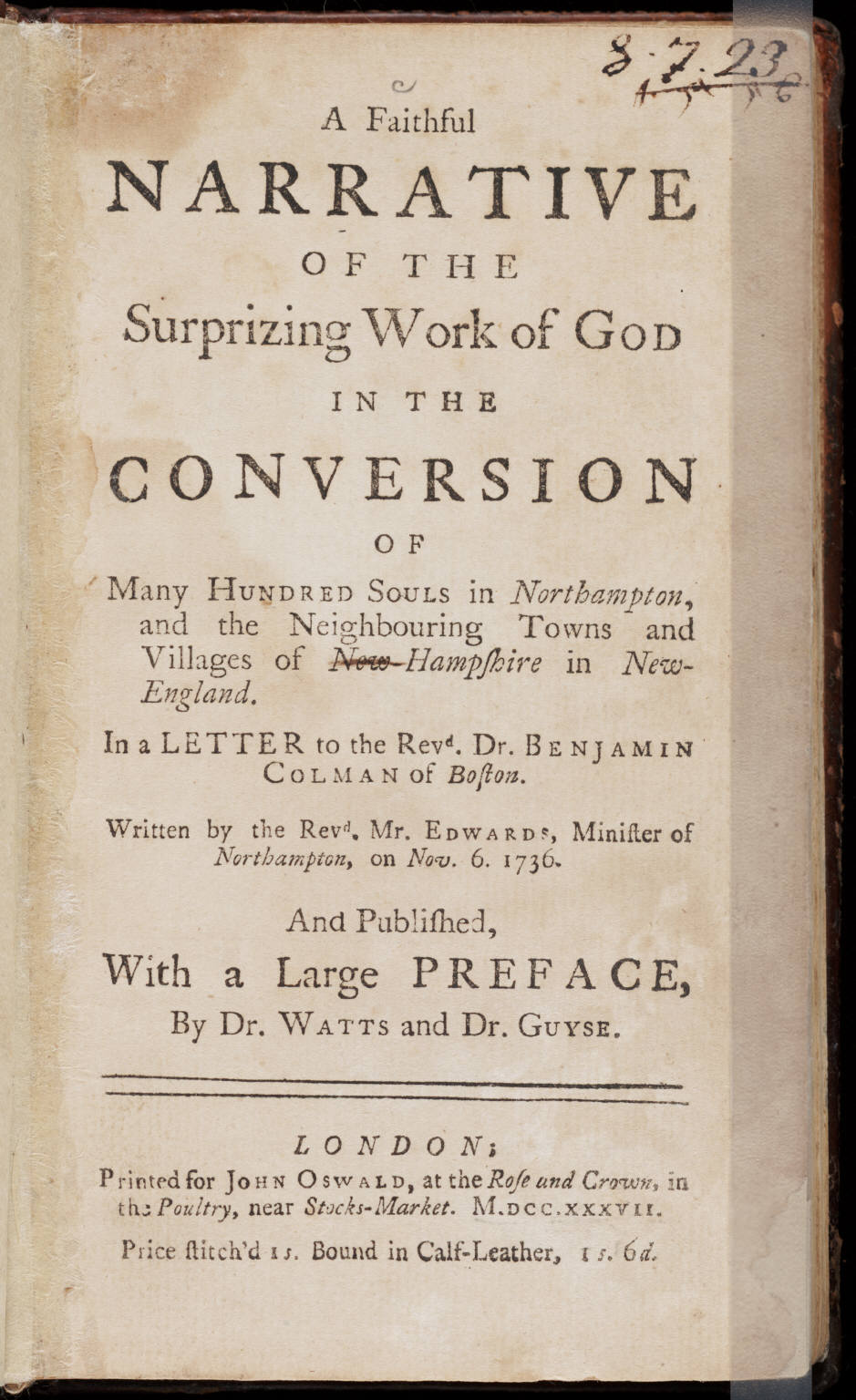
Edwards, Jonathan (1737), A Faithful Narrative of the Surprizing Work of God in the Conversion of Many Hundred Souls in Northampton, London

He entered Yale College in 1716 at just under the age of 13. In the following year, he became acquainted with John Locke's Essay Concerning Human Understanding, which influenced him profoundly. During his college studies, he kept notebooks labeled "The Mind," "Natural Science" (containing a discussion of the atomic theory), "The Scriptures" and "Miscellanies", had a grand plan for a work on natural and mental philosophy, and drew up rules for its composition. He was interested in natural history and, as an 11-year-old, had observed and written an essay detailing the ballooning behavior of some spiders. Edwards edited this text later to match the burgeoning genre of scientific literature, and his "The Flying Spider" fit easily into the contemporary scholarship on spiders. Although he studied theology for two years after his graduation from Yale, Edwards continued to be interested in science. Although many European scientists and American clergymen found the implications of science pushing them towards deism, Edwards believed the natural world was evidence of God's masterful design. Throughout his life, Edwards often went into the woods as a favorite place to pray and worship in the beauty and solace of nature.

Edwards was fascinated by the discoveries of Isaac Newton and other scientists of this time period. Before he started working as a full-time pastor in Northampton, he wrote on various topics in natural philosophy, including light and optics, in addition to spiders. While he worried about those of his contemporaries who seemed preoccupied by materialism and faith in reason alone, he considered the laws of nature to be derived from God and demonstrating his wisdom and care. Edwards's written sermons and theological treatises emphasize the beauty of God and the role of aesthetics in the spiritual life. He is thought to anticipate a 20th-century current of theological aesthetics, represented by figures such as Hans Urs von Balthasar.

In 1722 to 1723, he was for eight months an un-ordained "supply" pastor (a clergyman employed to preach and minister in a church for a definite time but not settled as a pastor) of a small Presbyterian church on William Street in New York City. The church invited him to remain, but he declined the call. After spending two months in study at home, in 1724–1726, he was one of the two tutors at Yale tasked with leading the college in the absence of a rector. Yale's previous rector, Timothy Cutler, lost his position when he defected to the Anglican Church. After two years, he had not been replaced.

He partially recorded the years 1720 to 1726 in his diary and in his resolutions for his conduct which he drew up at this time. He had long been an eager seeker after salvation and was not fully satisfied as to his own conversion until an experience in his last year in college, when he lost his feeling that the election of some to salvation and of others to eternal damnation was "a horrible doctrine", and reckoned it "exceedingly pleasant, bright and sweet". He now took a great and new joy in taking in the beauties of nature and delighted in the allegorical interpretation of the Song of Solomon. Balancing these mystic joys is the stern tone of his 70 Resolutions, in which he is almost ascetic in his eagerness to live earnestly and soberly, to waste no time, to maintain the strictest temperance in eating and drinking.

On February 15, 1727, Edwards was ordained minister at Northampton and assistant to his grandfather Solomon Stoddard, a noted minister. He was a scholar-pastor, not a visiting pastor, his rule being 13 hours of study per day. In the same year, he married Sarah Pierpont. Then 17, Sarah was from a notable New England clerical family: her father was James Pierpont, a founder of Yale College; and her mother was the granddaughter of Thomas Hooker. Sarah's spiritual devotion was without peer, and her relationship with God had long proved an inspiration to Edwards. He first remarked on her great piety when she was 13 years old. She was of a bright and cheerful disposition, a practical housekeeper, a model wife, and the mother of his 11 children, who included Esther Edwards. Edwards held to complementarian views of marriage and gender roles.

Solomon Stoddard died on February 11, 1729, leaving to his grandson the sole ministerial charge of one of the largest and wealthiest congregations in the colony. Its members were proud of its morality, its culture and its reputation. Summing up Edwards's influences during his younger years, scholar John E. Smith writes, "By thus meditating between Berkeley on the one hand and Locke, Descartes, and Hobbes on the other, the young Edwards hoped to rescue Christianity from the deadweight of rationalism and the paralyzing inertia of skepticism."

=== First Great Awakening ===
On July 8, 1731, Edwards preached in Boston the "Public Lecture," afterwards published under the title "God Glorified in the Work of Redemption, by the Greatness of Man's Dependence upon Him, in the Whole of It," which was his first public attack on Arminianism. The emphasis of the lecture was on God's absolute sovereignty in the work of salvation: while it behooved God to create man pure and without sin, it was of his "good pleasure" and "mere and arbitrary grace" for him to grant any person the faith necessary to incline him or her toward holiness, and that God might deny this grace to any without any disparagement of his own character. In 1733, a spiritual revival began in Northampton and reached such an intensity in the winter of 1734 and the following spring that it threatened the business of the town. In six months, nearly 300 of 1,100 youths were admitted to the church.

The revival gave Edwards an opportunity to study the process of conversion in all its phases and varieties, and he recorded his observations with psychological minuteness and discrimination in A Faithful Narrative of the Surprising Work of God in the Conversion of Many Hundred Souls in Northampton (1737). A year later, he published Discourses on Various Important Subjects, the five sermons which had proved most effective in the revival. Of these, none was so immediately effective as that on The Justice of God in the Damnation of Sinners, from the text, "That every mouth may be stopped." Another sermon, published in 1734, A Divine and Supernatural Light, Immediately Imparted to the Soul by the Spirit of God, set forth what he regarded as the inner, moving principle of the revival, the doctrine of a special grace in the immediate, and supernatural divine illumination of the soul.

By 1735, the revival had spread and appeared independently across the Connecticut River Valley and perhaps as far as New Jersey. However, criticism of the revival began, and many New Englanders feared that Edwards had led his flock into fanaticism.

Over the summer of 1735, religious fervor took a dark turn. Many New Englanders were affected by the revivals but not converted and became convinced of their inexorable damnation. Edwards wrote that "multitudes" felt urged – presumably by Satan – to take their own lives. At least two people committed suicide in the depths of their spiritual distress, one from Edwards's own congregation – his uncle Joseph Hawley II. It is not known if any others took their own lives, but the "suicide craze" effectively ended the first wave of revival, except in some parts of Connecticut.

Despite these setbacks and the cooling of religious fervor, word of the Northampton revival and Edwards's leadership role had spread as far as England and Scotland. It was at this time that Edwards became acquainted with George Whitefield, who was traveling the Thirteen Colonies on a revival tour in 1739–40. The two men may not have seen eye to eye on every detail. Whitefield was far more comfortable with the strongly emotional elements of revival than Edwards was, but they were both passionate about preaching the Gospel. They worked together to orchestrate Whitefield's trip, first through Boston and then to Northampton. When Whitefield preached at Edwards's church in Northampton, he reminded them of the revival they had undergone just a few years before. This deeply touched Edwards, who wept throughout the entire service, and much of the congregation too was moved.

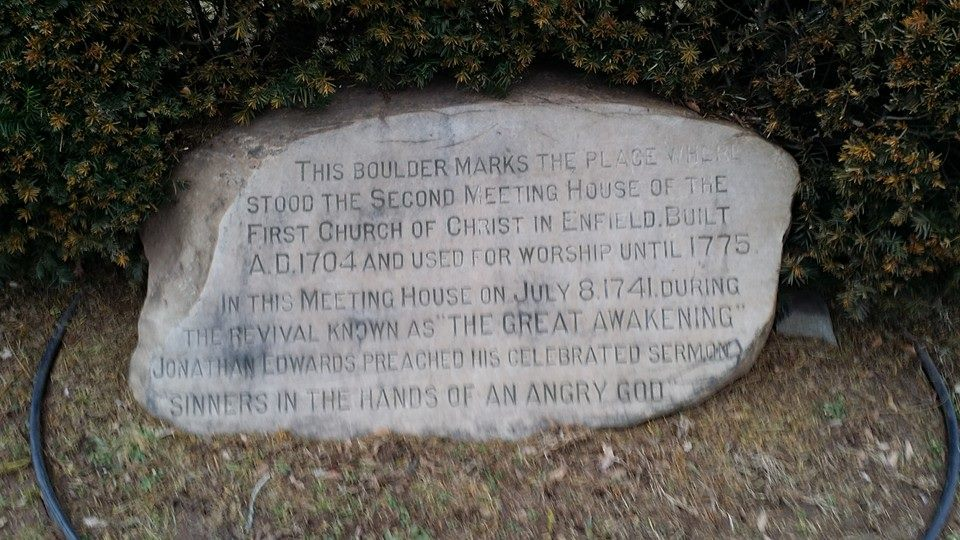
Monument in Enfield, Connecticut commemorating the location where Sinners in the Hands of an Angry God was preached. The monument is on the grounds of Enfield Montessori School.

Revivals began to spring up again, and Edwards preached his most famous sermon, Sinners in the Hands of an Angry God, in Enfield, Connecticut, in 1741. Though this sermon has been widely reprinted as an example of "fire and brimstone" preaching in the colonial revivals, that characterization is not in keeping with descriptions of Edward's actual preaching style. Edwards did not shout or speak loudly, but talked in a quiet, emotive voice. He moved his audience slowly from point to point, towards an inexorable conclusion: they were lost without the grace of God. While most 21st-century readers notice the damnation looming in such a sermon text, historian George Marsden reminds us that Edwards was not preaching anything new or surprising: "Edwards could take for granted... that a New England audience knew well the Gospel remedy. The problem was getting them to seek it.".

The movement met with opposition from conservative Congregationalist ministers. In 1741, Edwards published in the defense of revivals The Distinguishing Marks of a Work of the Spirit of God, dealing particularly with the phenomena most criticized: the swoonings, outcries, and convulsions. These "bodily effects," he insisted, were not distinguishing marks of the work of the Spirit of God one way or another. So bitter was the feeling against the revival in some churches that in 1742 he felt moved to write a second apology, Thoughts on the Revival in New England, where his main argument concerned the great moral improvement of the country. In the same pamphlet he defends an appeal to the emotions and advocates preaching terror when necessary, even to children, who in God's sight "are young vipers... if not Christ's."

He considered "bodily effects" incidental to the real work of God. But his own mystic devotion and the experiences of his wife during the Awakening (which he recounts in detail) make him think that the divine visitation usually overpowers the body, a view in support of which he quotes Scripture. In reply to Edwards, Charles Chauncy wrote Seasonable Thoughts on the State of Religion in New England in 1743 and anonymously penned The Late Religious Commotions in New England Considered in the same year. In these works, he urged conduct as the sole test of conversion. The general convention of Congregational ministers in the Province of Massachusetts Bay seemed to agree, protesting "against disorders in practice which have of late obtained in various parts of the land." In spite of Edwards's able pamphlet, the impression had become widespread that "bodily effects" were recognized by the promoters of the Great Awakening as the true tests of conversion.

To offset this feeling, during the years 1742 and 1743, Edwards preached at Northampton a series of sermons published under the title of Religious Affections (1746), a restatement in a more philosophical and general tone of his ideas as to "distinguishing marks." In 1747, he joined the movement started in Scotland called the "concert in prayer," and in the same year published An Humble Attempt to Promote Explicit Agreement and Visible Union of God's People in Extraordinary Prayer for the Revival of Religion and the Advancement of Christ's Kingdom on Earth. In 1749, he published a memoir of David Brainerd, who had lived with his family for several months and had died at Northampton in 1747. Brainerd had been constantly attended by Edwards's daughter Jerusha, to whom he was rumored to have been engaged to be married, though there is no surviving evidence of this. In the course of elaborating his theories of conversion, Edwards used David Brainerd and his ministry as a case study, making extensive notes of his conversions and confessions.

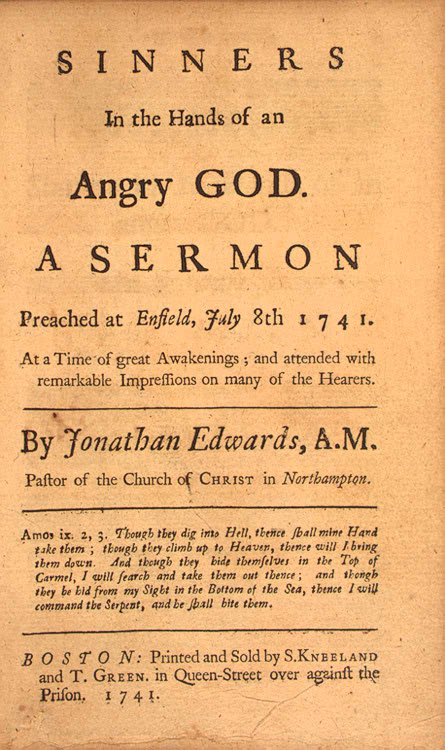
Edwards, Rev. Jonathan (July 8, 1741), Sinners in the Hands of an Angry God, A Sermon Preached at Enfield

== Later years ==
In 1748, there had come a crisis in his relations with his congregation. The Half-Way Covenant, adopted by the synods of 1657 and 1662, had made baptism alone the condition to the civil privileges of church membership, but not of participation in the sacrament of the Lord's Supper. Stoddard had been even more liberal, holding that the Lord's Supper was a converting ordinance and that baptism was a sufficient title to all the privileges of the church.

As early as 1744, Edwards, in his sermons on Religious Affections, had plainly intimated his dislike of this practice. In the same year, he had published in a church meeting the names of certain young people, members of the church, who were suspected of reading improper books, and also the names of those who were to be called as witnesses in the case. It has often been reported that the witnesses and accused were not distinguished on this list, and so the entire congregation was in an uproar. However, Patricia Tracy's research has cast doubt on this version of the events, noting that in the list he read from, the names were definitely distinguished. Those involved were eventually disciplined for disrespect to the investigators rather than for the original incident. In any case, the incident further deteriorated the relationship between Edwards and the congregation.

Edwards's preaching became unpopular. For four years, no candidate presented himself for admission to the church, and when one eventually did, in 1748, he was met with Edwards's formal tests as expressed in the Distinguishing Marks and later in Qualifications for Full Communion, 1749. The candidate refused to submit to them, the church backed him, and the break between the church and Edwards was complete. Even permission to discuss his views in the pulpit was refused. He was allowed to present his views on Thursday afternoons. His sermons were well attended by his fans but not his own congregation. A council was convened to decide the communion matter between the minister and his people. The congregation chose half the council, and Edwards was allowed to select the other half of the council. His congregation, however, limited his selection to one county where the majority of the ministers were against him. The ecclesiastical council voted by 10 to 9 that the pastoral relation be dissolved.

The church members, by a vote of more than 200 to 23, ratified the action of the council, and finally a town meeting voted that Edwards should not be allowed to occupy the Northampton pulpit, though he continued to live in the town and preach in the church by the request of the congregation until October 1751. In his "Farewell Sermon" he preached from 2 Corinthians 1:14 and directed the thoughts of his people to that far future when the minister and his people would stand before God. In a letter to Scotland after his dismissal, he expresses his preference for Presbyterian to congregational polity. His position at the time was not unpopular throughout New England. His doctrine that the Lord's Supper is not a cause of regeneration and that communicants should be professing Protestants has since (largely through the efforts of his pupil Joseph Bellamy) become a standard of New England Congregationalism.

Edwards was in high demand. A parish in Scotland could have been procured for him. He declined this to become pastor in 1751 of the church in Stockbridge, Massachusetts and a missionary to the Housatonic Indians, taking over for the recently deceased John Sergeant. To the Indians, he preached through an interpreter, and their interests he boldly and successfully defended, by attacking the whites who were using their official positions among them to increase their private fortunes. During this time he got to know Judge Joseph Dwight who was trustee of the Indian Schools. In Stockbridge, he wrote the Humble Relation, also called Reply to Williams (1752), which was an answer to Solomon Williams, a relative and a bitter opponent of Edwards as to the qualifications for full communion. He composed the treatises on which his reputation as a philosophical theologian chiefly rests, the essay on Original Sin, the Dissertation Concerning the Nature of True Virtue, the Dissertation Concerning the End for which God created the World, and the great work on the Will, written in four and a half months and published in 1754 under the title, An Inquiry into the Modern Prevailing Notions Respecting that Freedom of the Will which is supposed to be Essential to Moral Agency.

Aaron Burr Sr., Edwards's son-in-law, died in 1757 (he had married Esther Edwards five years before, and they had made Edwards the grandfather of Aaron Burr, later U.S. vice president). Edwards felt himself in "the decline of life", and inadequate to the office, but was persuaded to replace Burr as president of the College of New Jersey (now Princeton University). He was installed on February 16, 1758. He gave weekly essay assignments in theology to the senior class.

== Death and legacy ==
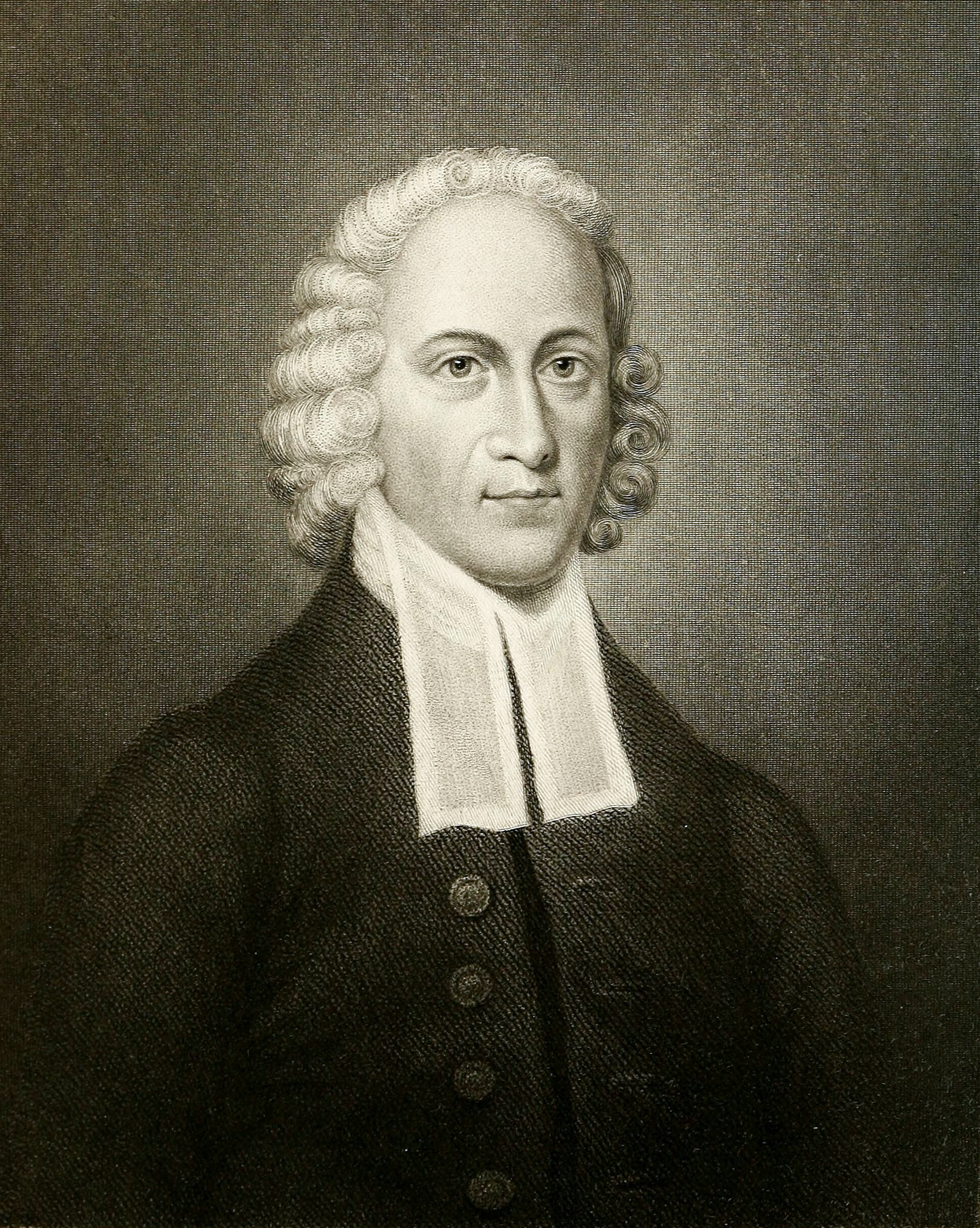
Engraving of Edwards by R Babson & J Andrews

Almost immediately after becoming president of the College of New Jersey, Edwards, a strong supporter of smallpox inoculations, decided to get inoculated in order to encourage others to do the same. Never having been in robust health, he died as a result of the inoculation on March 22, 1758. Edwards left behind three sons and eight daughters. The grave of Edwards is located in Princeton Cemetery. Written in Latin, the long emotional epitaph inscription on the horizontal gravestone eulogizes his life and career and laments the great loss of his passing. It draws from the classical tradition in extolling the virtues of the deceased and directly inviting the passerby to pause and mourn.

The followers of Jonathan Edwards and his disciples came to be known as the New Light Calvinist ministers. Prominent disciples included the New Divinity school's Samuel Hopkins, Joseph Bellamy, Jonathan Edwards Jr., and Gideon Hawley. Through a practice of apprentice ministers living in the homes of older ministers, they eventually filled a large number of pastorates in the New England area. Many of Jonathan and Sarah Edwards's descendants became prominent citizens in the United States, including Burr and college presidents Timothy Dwight, Jonathan Edwards Jr. and Merrill Edwards Gates. Jonathan and Sarah Edwards were also ancestors of Edith Roosevelt, the writer O. Henry, the publisher Frank Nelson Doubleday, and the writer Robert Lowell. The eminence of many descendants of Edwards led some Progressive Era scholars to view him as proof of eugenics. His descendants have had a disproportionate effect upon American culture: his biographer George Marsden notes that "the Edwards family produced scores of clergymen, thirteen presidents of higher learning, sixty-five professors, and many other persons of notable achievements."

Edwards's writings and beliefs continue to influence individuals and groups to this day. Early American Board of Commissioners for Foreign Missions missionaries were influenced by Edwards's writings, as is evidenced in reports in the ABCFM's journal "The Missionary Herald," and beginning with Perry Miller's seminal work, Edwards enjoyed a renaissance among scholars around the time of the Second World War. The Banner of Truth Trust and other publishers continue to reprint Edwards's works, and most of his major works are now available through the series published by Yale University Press, which has spanned three decades and supplies critical introductions by the editor of each volume. Yale has also established the Jonathan Edwards Project online. Author and teacher, Elisabeth Woodbridge Morris, memorialized him, her paternal ancestor (3rd great-grandfather) in two books, The Jonathan Papers (1912), and More Jonathan Papers (1915). In 1933, he became the namesake of Jonathan Edwards College, the first of the 12 residential colleges of Yale, and The Jonathan Edwards Center at Yale University was founded to provide scholarly information about Edwards's writings. Edwards is remembered today as a teacher and missionary by the Evangelical Lutheran Church in America on March 22. The contemporary poet Susan Howe frequently describes the composition of Edwards's manuscripts and notebooks held at the Beinecke Rare Book and Manuscript Library in a number of her books of poetry and prose, including Souls of the Labadie Tract, 2007 and That This, 2010. She notes how some of Edwards's notebooks were hand sewn from silk paper that his sisters and wife used for making fans. Howe also argues in My Emily Dickinson that Emily Dickinson was formatively influenced by Edwards's writings, and that she "took both his legend and his learning, tore them free from his own humorlessness and the dead weight of doctrinaire Calvinism, then applied the freshness of his perception to the dead weight of American poetry as she knew it."

He was the maternal grandfather of Aaron Burr, the third United States vice president and the murderer of Alexander Hamilton.

=== Slavery ===
During his lifetime Edwards owned several slaves. In June 1731, he purchased a young black teenager named Venus. In subsequent years, he acquired at least five more slaves: Joab and Rose Binney, Titus, Joseph, and Sue. Edwards joined Joab and Rose in marriage in 1751; Titus was their son. Joseph and Sue were also a married couple. Edwards also owned a slave by the name of Leah, though this is likely the biblical name given to Venus as she was admitted as a full member to Edwards's church by 1736. In a 1741 pamphlet, Edwards defended the institution for those who were debtors, war captives, or were born enslaved in North America, but rejected the Atlantic slave trade as cruel and inhumane.

Attention to this fact became prominent during the 2010s and 2020s. Responses have ranged from condemnation to the view that he was a man of his time. Other commentators have sought to maintain what they see as valuable in Edwards's theology, while condemning his involvement in slavery.

== Works ==
The Beinecke Rare Book & Manuscript Library at Yale University holds the majority of Edwards's surviving manuscripts, including over one thousand sermons, notebooks, correspondence, printed materials, and artifacts. Two of Edwards's manuscript sermons and other related historical texts are held by The Presbyterian Historical Society in Philadelphia. The entire corpus of Edwards's works, including previously unpublished works, is available online through the Jonathan Edwards Center at Yale University website. The Works of Jonathan Edwards project at Yale has been bringing out scholarly editions of Edwards based on fresh transcriptions of his manuscripts since the 1950s; there are 26 volumes so far. Many of Edwards's works have been regularly reprinted. Some of the major works include:

- Charity and its Fruits
- Protestant Charity or The Duty of Charity to the Poor, Explained and Enforced (1732)
- A Dissertation Concerning the End for Which God Created the World
- Distinguishing Marks of a Work of the Spirit of God
- A Divine and Supernatural Light, Immediately Imparted to the Soul by the Spirit of God (1734)
- A Faithful Narrative of the Surprising Work of God in the Conversion of Many Hundred Souls in Northampton
- The Freedom of the Will (1754)
- A History of the Work of Redemption including a View of Church History
- The Life of David Brainerd
- The Nature of True Virtue
- Original Sin
- Some Thoughts Concerning the Present Revival in New England and the Way it Ought to be Acknowledged and Promoted
- Religious Affections

=== Sermons ===
The text of many of Edwards's sermons have been preserved, some are still published and read today among general anthologies of American literature. Among his more well-known sermons are:

- "The Justice of God in the Damnation of Sinners"
- "The Manner of Seeking Salvation"
- "Pressing into the Kingdom of God"
- "Sinners in the Hands of an Angry God"
- "The Folly Of Looking Back In Fleeing Out Of Sodom"

== See also ==
- Atonement (governmental view)
- Mission House (Stockbridge, Massachusetts)
- New England Dwight family

== Citations ==
Academic offices
Preceded by Aaron Burr Sr.	President of the College of New Jersey; 1758–1758	Succeeded by Jacob Green (Acting); Samuel Davies
