= First Great Awakening =

Christian revivals in Britain and the Thirteen Colonies in the 1730s–1740s

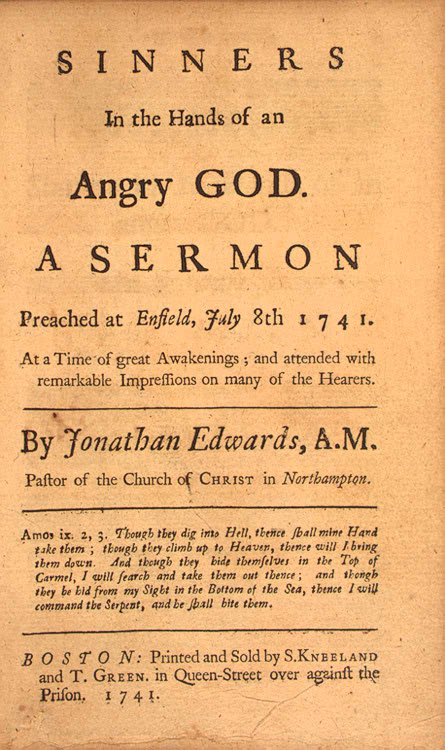
Jonathan Edwards' 1741 sermon "Sinners in the Hands of an Angry God"

The First Great Awakening, sometimes called the Great Awakening or the Evangelical Revival, was a series of Christian revivals that swept Britain and its thirteen North American colonies in the 1730s and 1740s. The revival movement permanently affected Protestantism, adherents striving to renew individual piety and religious devotion. The Great Awakening marked the emergence of Anglo-American evangelicalism as a trans-denominational movement within the Protestant churches. In the United States, the term Great Awakening is most often used, while in the United Kingdom, the movement is referred to as the Evangelical Revival.

Building on the foundations of older traditions — Puritanism, Pietism, and Presbyterianism — major leaders of the revival such as George Whitefield, John Wesley, and Jonathan Edwards articulated a theology of revival and salvation that transcended denominational boundaries and helped forge a common evangelical identity. Revivalists added to the doctrinal imperatives of Reformation Protestantism an emphasis on providential outpourings of the Holy Spirit. Extemporaneous preaching gave listeners a sense of deep personal conviction about their need for salvation by Jesus Christ and fostered introspection. Revival theology stressed that religious conversion was not only intellectual assent to correct Christian doctrine but had to be a "new birth" experienced in the heart. Revivalists also taught that receiving assurance of salvation was a normal expectation in the Christian life.

While the Evangelical Revival united evangelicals across various denominations around shared beliefs, it also led to division in existing churches between those who supported the revivals and those who did not. Opponents accused the revivals of fostering disorder and fanaticism within the churches by allowing the uneducated to be itinerant preachers and encourage religious enthusiasm. In England, Evangelical Anglicans would grow into an important constituency within the Church of England, and Methodism would develop out of the ministries of Whitefield and Wesley. In the American colonies, the Awakening caused the Congregational and Presbyterian churches to split, while strengthening both the Methodist and Baptist denominations. It had little immediate impact on most Lutherans, Quakers, and non-Protestants, but later gave rise to a schism among Quakers that persists to this day.

Evangelical preachers "sought to include every person in conversion, regardless of gender, race, and status." Throughout the North American colonies, especially in the South, the revival movement increased the number of African slaves and free blacks who were exposed to (and subsequently converted to) Christianity. It also inspired the founding of new missionary societies, such as the Baptist Missionary Society in 1792.

== Continental Europe ==
Historian Sydney E. Ahlstrom sees the Great Awakening as part of a "great international Protestant upheaval" that also created Pietism in the Lutheran and Reformed churches of continental Europe. Pietism emphasized heartfelt religious faith in reaction to an overly intellectual Protestant scholasticism perceived as spiritually dry. Significantly, the Pietists placed less emphasis on traditional doctrinal divisions between Protestant churches, focusing rather on religious experience and affections.

Pietism prepared Europe for revival, and it usually occurred in areas where pietism was strong. The most important leader of the Awakening in central Europe was Nicolaus Zinzendorf, a Saxon noble who studied under Pietist leader August Hermann Francke at Halle University. In 1722, Zinzendorf invited members of the Moravian Church to live and worship on his estates, establishing a community at Herrnhut. The Moravians came to Herrnhut as refugees, but under Zinzendorf's guidance, the group enjoyed a religious revival. Soon, the community became a refuge for other Protestants as well, including German Lutherans, Reformed Christians, and Anabaptists. The church began to grow, and Moravian societies would be established in England, where they would help foster the Evangelical Revival as well.

== Evangelical Revival in Britain ==
=== England ===
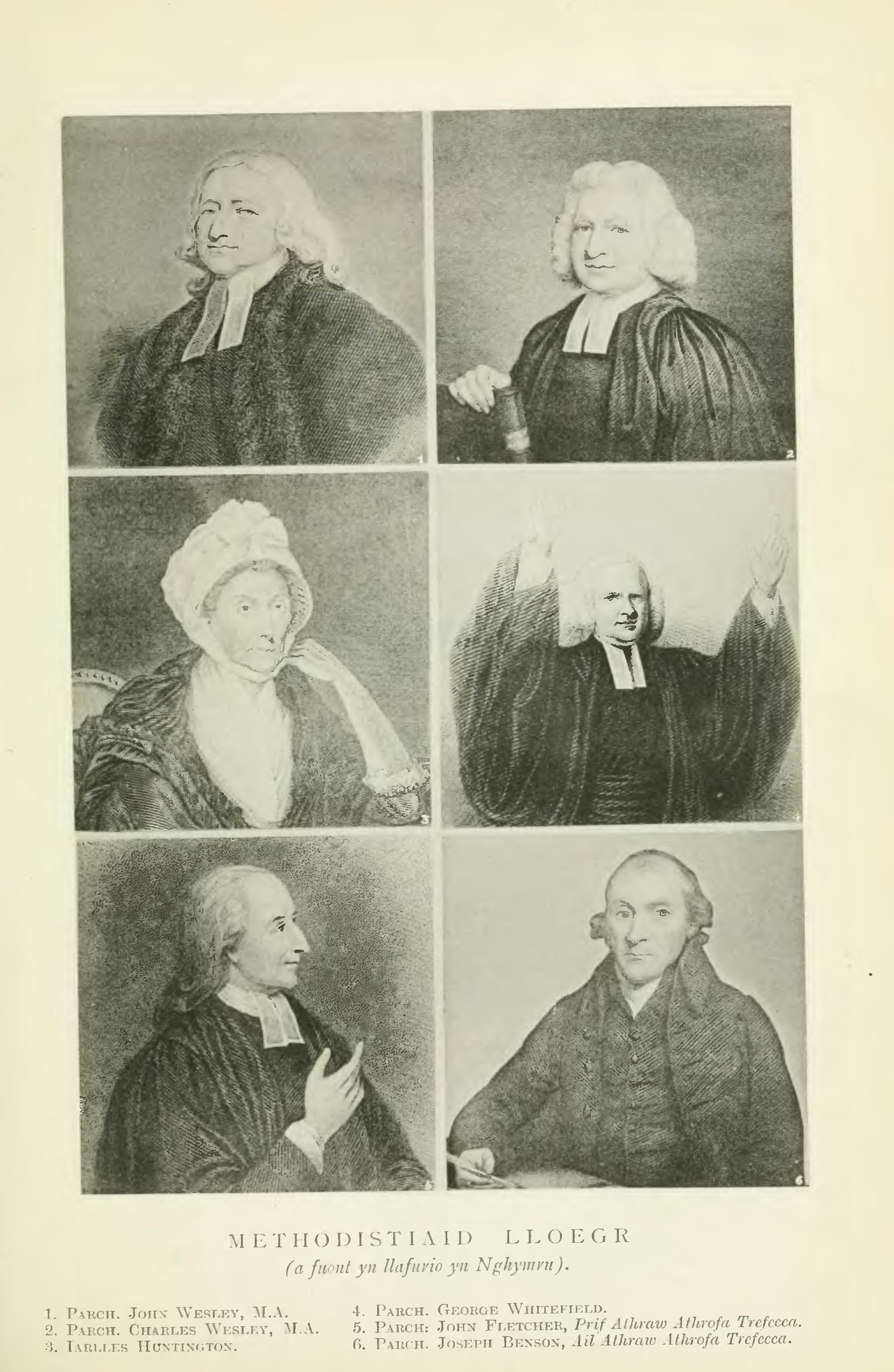
Methodist leaders active in the Evangelical Revival (clockwise): John Wesley, Charles Wesley, George Whitefield, Joseph Benson, John Fletcher and the Countess of Huntingdon (1895 Welsh illustration)

While known as the Great Awakening in the United States, the 18th-century revival movement is referred to as the Evangelical Revival in Britain. In England, the major leaders of the Evangelical Revival were three Anglican priests: the brothers John and Charles Wesley and their friend George Whitefield. Together, they founded what would become Methodism. They had been members of a religious society at Oxford University called the Holy Club and "Methodists" due to their methodical piety and rigorous asceticism. This society was modeled on the collegia pietatis (cell groups) used by pietists for Bible study, prayer, and accountability. All three men experienced a spiritual crisis in which they sought true conversion and assurance of faith.

George Whitefield joined the Holy Club in 1733 and, under the influence of Charles Wesley, read German pietist August Hermann Francke's Against the Fear of Man and Scottish theologian Henry Scougal's The Life of God in the Soul of Man (the latter work was a favorite of Puritans). Scougal wrote that many people mistakenly understood Christianity to be "Orthodox Notions and Opinions", "external Duties" or "rapturous Heats and extatic Devotion". Rather, Scougal wrote, "True Religion is a Union of the Soul with God ... It is Christ formed within us." Whitefield wrote that "though I had fasted, watched and prayed, and received the Sacrament long, yet I never knew what true religion was" until he read Scougal. From that point on, Whitefield sought a new birth. After a period of spiritual struggle, Whitefield experienced conversion during Lent in 1735. In 1736, he began preaching in Bristol and London. His preaching attracted large crowds who were drawn to his simple message of the necessity of the new birth as well as by his manner of delivery. His style was dramatic, and his preaching appealed to his audience's emotions. At times, he wept or impersonated Bible characters. By the time he left England for the colony of Georgia in December 1737, Whitefield had become a celebrity.

John Wesley left for Georgia in October 1735 to become a missionary for the Society for Promoting Christian Knowledge. Wesley made contact with members of the Moravian Church, led by August Gottlieb Spangenberg. Wesley was impressed by their faith and piety, especially their belief that it was normal for a Christian to have assurance of faith. The failure of his mission and encounters with the Moravians led Wesley to question his own faith. He wrote in his journal, "I, who went to America to convert others, was never myself converted to God."

Back in London, Wesley became friends with Moravian minister Peter Boehler and joined a Moravian small group called the Fetter Lane Society. In May 1738, Wesley attended a Moravian meeting on Aldersgate Street, where he felt spiritually transformed during a reading of Martin Luther's preface to the Epistle to the Romans. Wesley recounted that "I felt my heart strangely warmed. I felt I did trust in Christ, Christ alone for salvation, and an assurance was given me that he had taken away my sins, even mine, and saved me from the law of sin and death." Wesley understood his Aldersgate experience to be an evangelical conversion, and it provided him with the assurance he had been seeking. Afterwards, he traveled to Herrnhut and met Zinzendorf in person.

John Wesley returned to England in September 1738. Both John and Charles preached in London churches. Whitefield stayed in Georgia for three months to establish Bethesda Orphanage before returning to England in December. While enjoying success, Whitefield's itinerant preaching was controversial. Many pulpits were closed to him, and he had to struggle against Anglicans who opposed the Methodists and the "doctrine of the New Birth". Whitefield wrote of his opponents, "I am fully convinced there is a fundamental difference between us and them. They believe only an outward Christ, we further believe that He must be inwardly formed in our hearts also."

In February 1739, parish priests in Bath and Bristol refused to allow Whitefield to preach in their churches on the grounds that he was a religious enthusiast. In response, he began open-air field preaching in the mining community of Kingswood, near Bristol. Open-air preaching was common in Wales, Scotland, and Northern Ireland, but it was unheard of in England. Further, Whitefield violated protocol by preaching in another priest's parish without permission. Within a week, he was preaching to crowds of 10,000. By March, Whitefield had moved on to preach elsewhere. By May, he was preaching to London crowds of 50,000. He left his followers in Bristol in the care of John Wesley. Whitefield's notoriety was increased through the use of newspaper advertisements to promote his revivals. Wesley was at first uneasy about preaching outdoors, as it was contrary to his high-church sense of decency. Eventually, however, Wesley changed his mind, claiming that "all the world [is] my parish". On April 2, 1739, Wesley preached to about 3,000 people near Bristol. From then on, he continued to preach wherever he could gather an assembly, taking the opportunity to recruit followers to the movement.

Faced with growing evangelistic and pastoral responsibilities, Wesley and Whitefield appointed lay preachers and leaders. Methodist preachers focused particularly on evangelizing people who had been "neglected" by the established Church of England. Wesley and his assistant preachers organized the new converts into Methodist societies. These societies were divided into groups called classes—intimate meetings where individuals were encouraged to confess their sins to one another and to build each other up. They also took part in love feasts, which allowed for the sharing of testimony, a key feature of early Methodism. Growth in numbers and increasing hostility impressed upon the revival converts a deep sense of their corporate identity. Three teachings that Methodists saw as the foundation of Christian faith were:

1. People are all, by nature, "dead in sin".
2. They are "justified by faith alone".
3. Faith produces inward and outward holiness.

The evangelicals responded vigorously to opposition—both literary criticism and even mob violence—and thrived despite the attacks against them. John Wesley's organizational skills during and after the peak of revivalism established him as the primary founder of the Methodist movement. By the time of Wesley's death in 1791, there were an estimated 71,668 Methodists in England and 43,265 in America.

=== Wales and Scotland ===
The Evangelical Revival first broke out in Wales. In 1735, Howell Harris and Daniel Rowland experienced a religious conversion and began preaching to large crowds throughout South Wales. Their preaching initiated the Welsh Methodist revival.

The origins of revivalism in Scotland stretch back to the 1620s. The attempts by the Stuart Kings to impose bishops on the Church of Scotland led to national protests in the form of the Covenanters. In addition, radical Presbyterian clergy held outdoor conventicles throughout southern and western Scotland, centered on the communion season. These revivals would also spread to Ulster and feature "marathon extemporaneous preaching and excessive popular enthusiasm." In the 18th century, the Evangelical Revival was led by ministers such as Ebenezer Erskine, William M'Culloch (the minister who presided over the Cambuslang Work of 1742), and James Robe (minister at Kilsyth). A substantial number of Church of Scotland ministers held evangelical views.

== Great Awakening in North America ==
=== Early revivals ===
In the early 18th century, the Thirteen Colonies were religiously diverse. In New England, the Congregational churches were the established religion, whereas in the religiously tolerant Middle Colonies, the Quakers, Dutch Reformed, Anglican, Presbyterian, Lutheran, Congregational, and Baptist churches all competed with each other on equal terms. In the Southern Colonies, the Anglican Church was officially established, though there were significant numbers of Baptists, Quakers, and Presbyterians. At the same time, church membership was low because it had failed to keep up with population growth, and the influence of Enlightenment rationalism was leading many people to turn to atheism, Deism, Unitarianism, and Universalism. The churches in New England had fallen into a "staid and routine formalism in which experiential faith had been a reality to only a scattered few."

In response to these trends, ministers influenced by New England Puritanism, Scots-Irish Presbyterianism, and European Pietism began calling for a revival of religion and piety. The blending of these three traditions would produce an evangelical Protestantism that placed greater importance "on seasons of revival, or outpourings of the Holy Spirit, and on converted sinners experiencing God's love personally." In the 1710s and 1720s, revivals became more frequent among New England Congregationalists. These early revivals remained local affairs due to the lack of coverage in print media. The first revival to receive widespread publicity was that precipitated by an earthquake off the coast of Massachusetts on October 29, 1727. As they began to be publicized more widely, revivals transformed from merely local to regional and transatlantic events.

In the 1720s and 1730s, an evangelical party took shape in the Presbyterian churches of the Middle Colonies, led by William Tennent, Sr. He established a seminary called the Log College, where he trained nearly 20 Presbyterian revivalists for the ministry, including his three sons and Samuel Blair. While pastoring a church in New Jersey, Gilbert Tennent became acquainted with Dutch Reformed minister Theodorus Jacobus Frelinghuysen. Historian Sydney Ahlstrom described Frelinghuysen as "an important herald, if not the father of the Great Awakening". A pietist, Frelinghuysen believed in the necessity of personal conversion and living a holy life. The revivals he led in the Raritan Valley were "forerunners" of the Great Awakening in the Middle Colonies. Under Frelinghuysen's influence, Tennent came to believe that a definite conversion experience followed by assurance of salvation was the key mark of a Christian. By 1729, Tennent was seeing signs of revival in the Presbyterian churches of New Brunswick and Staten Island. At the same time, Gilbert's brothers, William and John, oversaw a revival in Freehold, New Jersey.

=== Northampton revival ===
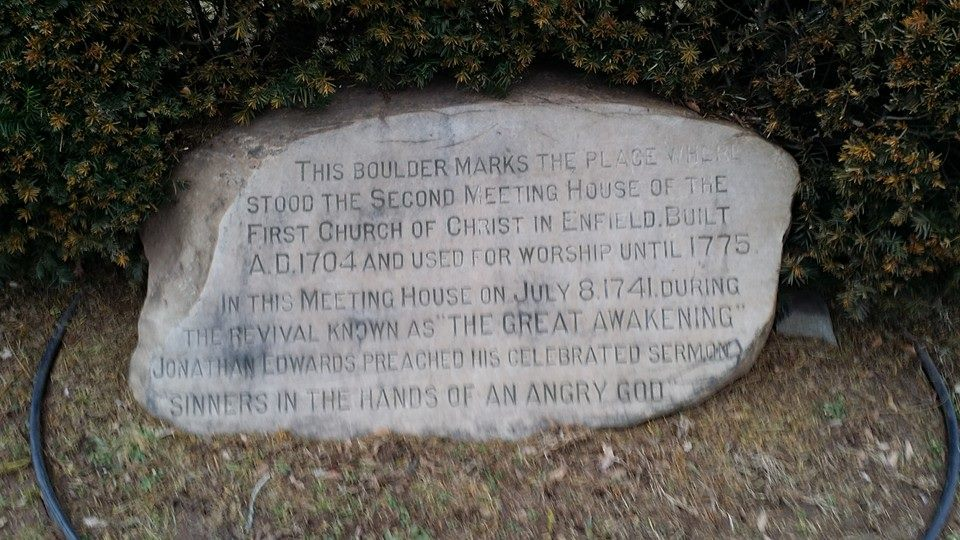
Monument in Enfield, Connecticut, commemorating the location where Sinners in the Hands of an Angry God was preached

The most influential evangelical revival was the Northampton revival of 1734–1735, under the leadership of Congregational minister Jonathan Edwards. In the fall of 1734, Edwards preached a sermon series on justification by faith alone, and the community's response was extraordinary. Signs of religious commitment among the laity increased, especially among the town's young people. Edwards wrote to Boston minister Benjamin Colman that the town "never was so full of Love, nor so full of Joy, nor so full of distress as it has lately been. ... I never saw the Christian spirit in Love to Enemies so exemplified, in all my Life as I have seen it within this half-year." The revival ultimately spread to 25 communities in western Massachusetts and central Connecticut until it began to wane in 1737.

At a time when Enlightenment rationalism and Arminian theology were popular among some Congregational clergy, Edwards held to traditional Calvinist doctrine. He understood conversion to be the experience of moving from spiritual deadness to joy in the knowledge of one's election (that one had been chosen by God for salvation). While a Christian might have several conversion moments as part of this process, Edwards believed there was a single point in time when God regenerated an individual, even if the exact moment could not be pinpointed.

The Northampton revival featured instances of what critics called enthusiasm but what supporters believed were signs of the Holy Spirit. Services became more emotional, and some people had visions and mystical experiences. Edwards cautiously defended these experiences as long as they led individuals to a greater belief in God's glory than in self-glorification. Similar experiences would appear in most of the major revivals of the 18th century.

Edwards wrote an account of the Northampton revival, A Faithful Narrative, which was published in England through the efforts of prominent evangelicals John Guyse and Isaac Watts. The publication of his account made Edwards a celebrity in Britain and influenced the growing revival movement in that nation. A Faithful Narrative would become a model on which other revivals would be conducted.

=== Whitefield, Tennent, and Davenport ===
George Whitefield first came to America in 1738 to serve at Christ Church in Savannah and found Bethesda Orphanage. Whitefield returned to the Colonies in November 1739. His first stop was in Philadelphia, where he initially preached at Christ Church, Philadelphia's Anglican Church, and then preached to a large outdoor crowd from the courthouse steps. He then preached in many Presbyterian churches. From Philadelphia, Whitefield traveled to New York and then to the South. In the Middle Colonies, he was popular in the Dutch and German communities as well as among the British. Lutheran pastor Henry Muhlenberg told of a German woman who heard Whitefield preach and, though she spoke no English, later said she had never before been so edified.

In 1740, Whitefield began touring New England. He landed in Newport, Rhode Island, on September 14, 1740, and preached several times in the Anglican church. He then moved on to Boston, Massachusetts, where he spent a week. There were prayers at King's Chapel (at the time an Anglican church) and preaching at Brattle Street Church and South Church. On September 20, Whitefield preached at First Church and then outside of it to about 8,000 people who could not gain entrance. The next day, he preached outdoors again to about 15,000 people. On Tuesday, he preached at Second Church and on Wednesday at Harvard University. After traveling as far as Portsmouth, New Hampshire, he returned to Boston on October 12 to preach to 30,000 people before continuing his tour.

Whitefield then traveled to Northampton at the invitation of Jonathan Edwards. He preached twice in the parish church, and Edwards was so moved that he wept. He then spent time in New Haven, Connecticut, where he preached at Yale University. From there, he traveled down the coast, reaching New York on October 29. Whitefield's assessment of New England's churches and clergy prior to his intervention was negative. "I am verily persuaded," he wrote, "the Generality of Preachers talk of an unknown, unfelt Christ. And the Reason why Congregations have been so dead, is because dead Men preach to them."

Whitefield met Gilbert Tennent on Staten Island and asked him to preach in Boston to continue the revival there. Tennent accepted and, in December, began a three-month-long preaching tour throughout New England. Besides Boston, Tennent preached in towns throughout Massachusetts, Rhode Island, and Connecticut. Like Whitefield's, Tennent's preaching produced large crowds, many conversions, and much controversy. While antirevivalists such as Timothy Cutler heavily criticized Tennent's preaching, most of Boston's ministers were supportive.

Tennent was followed in the summer of 1741 by itinerant minister James Davenport, who proved to be more controversial than either Tennent or Whitefield. His rants and attacks against "unconverted" ministers inspired much opposition, and he was arrested in Connecticut for violating a law against itinerant preaching. At his trial, he was found mentally ill and deported to Long Island. Soon after, he arrived in Boston and resumed his fanatical preaching, only to once again be declared insane and expelled. The last of Davenport's radical episodes took place in March 1743 in New London, when he ordered his followers to burn wigs, cloaks, rings, and other vanities. He also ordered the burning of books by religious authors such as John Flavel and Increase Mather. Following the intervention of two pro-revival "New Light" ministers, Davenport's mental state apparently improved, and he published a retraction of his earlier excesses.

Whitefield, Tennent, and Davenport would be followed by a number of both clerical and lay itinerants. However, the Awakening in New England was primarily sustained by the efforts of parish ministers. Sometimes revival would be initiated by regular preaching or the customary pulpit exchanges between two ministers. Through their efforts, New England experienced a "great and general Awakening" between 1740 and 1743, characterized by a greater interest in religious experience, widespread emotional preaching, and intense emotional reactions accompanying conversion, including fainting and weeping. There was a greater emphasis on prayer and devotional reading, and the Puritan ideal of converted church membership was revived. It is estimated that between 20,000 and 50,000 new members were admitted to New England's Congregational churches even as expectations for members increased.

By 1745, the Awakening had begun to wane. Revivals would continue to spread to the southern backcountry and slave communities in the 1750s and 1760s.

=== Conflict ===
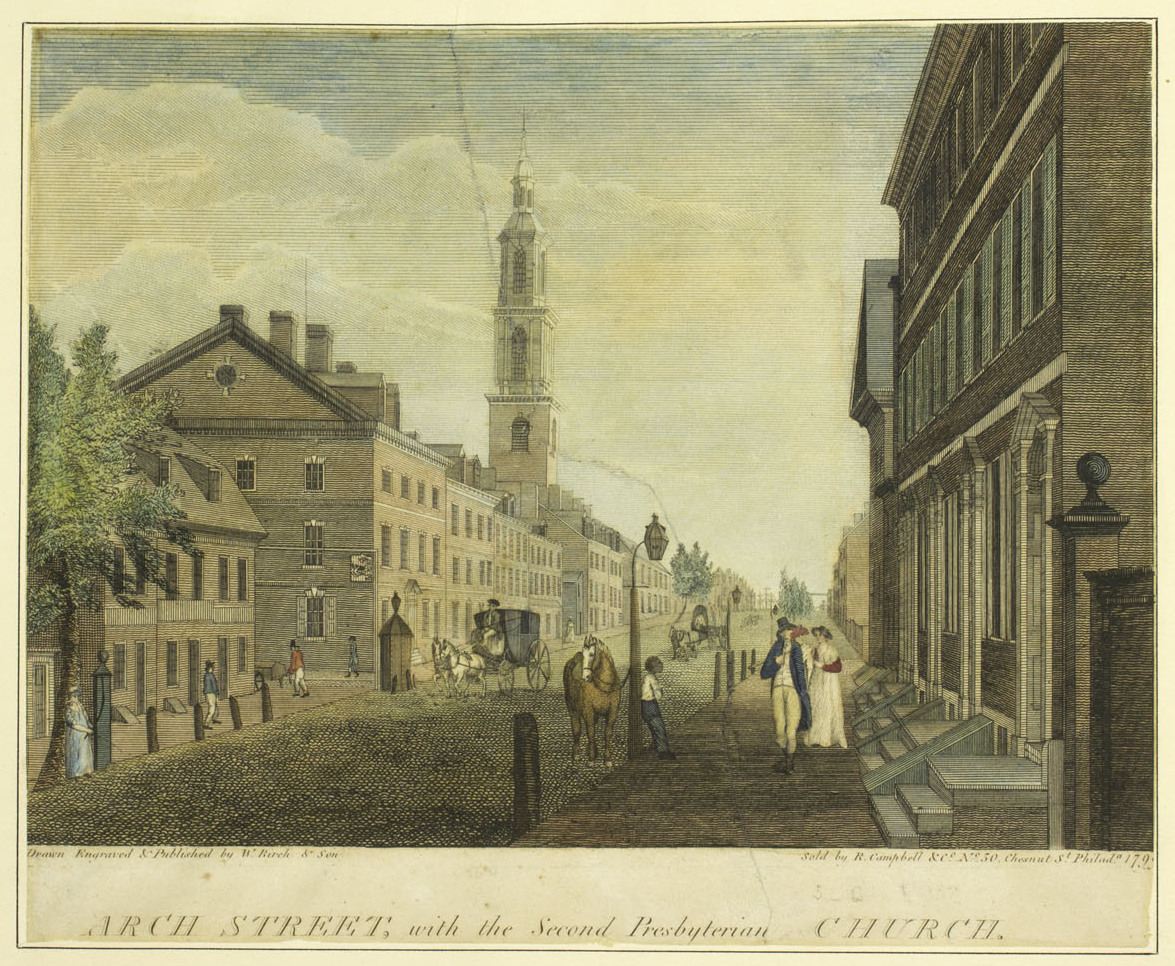
Philadelphia's Second Presbyterian Church, ministered by New Light Gilbert Tennent, was built between 1750 and 1753 after the split between Old and New Side Presbyterians.

The Great Awakening aggravated existing conflicts within the Protestant churches, often leading to schisms between supporters of revival, known as "New Lights", and opponents of revival, known as "Old Lights". The Old Lights saw the religious enthusiasm and itinerant preaching unleashed by the Awakening as disruptive to church order, preferring formal worship and a settled, university-educated ministry. They mocked revivalists as being ignorant, heterodox, or con artists. New Lights accused Old Lights of being more concerned with social status than with saving souls and even questioned whether some Old Light ministers were even converted. They also supported itinerant ministers who disregarded parish boundaries.

Congregationalists in New England experienced 98 schisms, which in Connecticut also affected which group would be considered "official" for tax purposes. It is estimated in New England that in the churches there were about one-third each of New Lights, Old Lights, and those who saw both sides as valid. The Awakening aroused a wave of separatist feeling within the Congregational churches of New England. Around 100 Separatist congregations were organized throughout the region by Strict Congregationalists. Objecting to the Halfway Covenant, Strict Congregationalists required evidence of conversion for church membership and also objected to the semi-presbyterian Saybrook Platform, which they felt infringed on congregational autonomy. Because they threatened Congregationalist uniformity, the Separatists were persecuted, and in Connecticut they were denied the same legal toleration enjoyed by Baptists, Quakers, and Anglicans.

The Baptists benefited the most from the Great Awakening. Although numerically small before the outbreak of revival, Baptist churches experienced growth during the last half of the 18th century. By 1804, there were over 300 Baptist churches in New England. This growth was primarily due to an influx of former New Light Congregationalists who became convinced of Baptist doctrines, such as believer's baptism. In some cases, entire Separatist congregations accepted Baptist beliefs.

As revivalism spread through the Presbyterian churches, the Old Side–New Side Controversy broke out between the anti-revival "Old Side" and the pro-revival "New Side". At issue was the place of revivalism in American Presbyterianism, specifically the "relation between doctrinal orthodoxy and experimental knowledge of Christ." The New Side, led by Gilbert Tennent and Jonathan Dickinson, believed that strict adherence to orthodoxy was meaningless if one lacked a personal religious experience, a sentiment expressed in Tennent's 1739 sermon "The Danger of an Unconverted Ministry". Whitefield's tour had helped the revival party grow but only worsened the controversy. When the Presbyterian Synod of Philadelphia met in May 1741, the Old Side expelled the New Side, which then reorganized itself into the Synod of New York.

=== Aftermath ===
Historian John Howard Smith noted that the Great Awakening made sectarianism an essential characteristic of American Christianity. While the Awakening divided many Protestant churches between Old and New Lights, it also unleashed a strong impulse towards interdenominational unity among the various Protestant denominations. Evangelicals considered the new birth to be "a bond of fellowship that transcended disagreements on fine points of doctrine and polity", allowing Anglicans, Presbyterians, Congregationalists, and others to cooperate across denominational lines.

While divisions between the Old and New Lights remained, the New Lights became less radical over time, and evangelicalism became more mainstream. By 1758, the Old Side–New Side split in the Presbyterian Church had been healed, and the two factions had reunited. In part, this was due to the growth of the New Side and the numerical decline of the Old Side. In 1741, the pro-revival party had around 22 ministers, but this number had increased to 73 by 1758. While the fervor of the Awakening would fade, the acceptance of revivalism and insistence on personal conversion would remain recurring features in 18th- and 19th-century Presbyterianism.

The Great Awakening inspired the creation of evangelical educational institutions. In 1746, New Side Presbyterians founded what would become Princeton University. In 1754, the efforts of Eleazar Wheelock led to what would become Dartmouth College, originally established to train Native American boys for missionary work among their own people. While initially resistant, well-established Yale University came to embrace revivalism and played a leading role in American evangelicalism for the next century.

== Revival theology ==
The Great Awakening was not the first time that Protestant churches had experienced revival; however, it was the first time a common evangelical identity had emerged based on a fairly uniform understanding of salvation, preaching the gospel, and conversion. Revival theology focused on the way of salvation—the stages by which a person receives Christian faith and then expresses that faith in the way they live.

The major figures of the Great Awakening, such as George Whitefield, Jonathan Edwards, Gilbert Tennent, Jonathan Dickinson, and Samuel Davies, were moderate evangelicals who preached a pietistic form of Calvinism heavily influenced by the Puritan tradition, which held that religion was not only an intellectual exercise but also had to be felt and experienced in the heart. This moderate revival theology consisted of a three-stage process. The first stage was conviction of sin, which was spiritual preparation for faith by God's law and the means of grace. The second stage was conversion, in which a person experienced spiritual illumination, repentance, and faith. The third stage was consolation, which was searching for and receiving assurance of salvation. This process generally takes place over an extended period of time.

=== Conviction of sin ===
Conviction of sin was the stage that prepared someone to receive salvation, and this stage often lasted weeks or months. When under conviction, nonbelievers realized they were guilty of sin and under divine condemnation and subsequently faced feelings of sorrow and anguish. When revivalists preached, they emphasized God's moral law to highlight the holiness of God and to spark conviction in the unconverted. Jonathan Edwards' sermon "Sinners in the Hands of an Angry God" is an example of such preaching.

As Calvinists, revivalists also preached the doctrines of original sin and unconditional election. Due to the fall of man, humans are naturally inclined to rebel against God and are unable to initiate or merit salvation, according to the doctrine of original sin. Unconditional election relates to the doctrine of predestination—that before the creation of the world, God determined who would be saved (the elect) on the basis of his own choosing. The preaching of these doctrines resulted in the convicted feeling both guilty and totally helpless, since God was in complete control over whether they would be saved or not.

Revivalists counseled those under conviction to apply the means of grace to their lives. These were spiritual disciplines such as prayer, Bible study, church attendance, and personal moral improvement. While no human action could produce saving faith, revivalists taught that the means of grace might make conversion more likely.

Revival preaching was controversial among Calvinists. Because Calvinists believed in election and predestination, some thought it inappropriate to preach to strangers that they could repent and receive salvation. For some, such preaching was only acceptable within their own churches and communities. The revivalists use of "indiscriminate" evangelism—the "practice of extending the gospel promises to everyone in their audiences, without stressing that God redeems only those elected for salvation"—was contrary to these notions. While they preached indiscriminately, however, revivalists continued to affirm Calvinist doctrines of election and predestination.

Another issue that had to be addressed was the intense physical and emotional reactions to conviction experienced during the Awakening. Samuel Blair described such responses to his preaching in 1740: "Several would be overcome and fainting; others deeply sobbing, hardly able to contain, others crying in a most dolorous manner, many others more silently weeping. ... And sometimes the soul exercises of some, thought comparatively but very few, would so far affect their bodies, as to occasion some strange, unusual bodily motions." Moderate evangelicals took a cautious approach to this issue, neither encouraging nor discouraging these responses, but they recognized that people might express their conviction in different ways.

=== Conversion ===
The conviction stage lasted so long because potential converts were waiting to find evidence of regeneration in their lives. The revivalists believed regeneration, or the new birth, was not simply an outward profession of faith or conformity to Christianity. They believed it was an instantaneous, supernatural work of the Holy Spirit, providing someone with "a new awareness of the beauty of Christ, new desires to love God, and a firm commitment to follow God's holy law." The reality of regeneration was discerned through self-examination, and while it occurred instantly, a convert might only gradually realize it had occurred.

Regeneration was always accompanied by saving faith, repentance, and love for God—all aspects of the conversion experience, which typically lasted several days or weeks under the guidance of a trained pastor. True conversion began when the mind opened to a new awareness and love of the gospel message. Following this illumination, converts placed their faith in Christ, depending on him alone for salvation. At the same time, a hatred of sin and a commitment to eliminate it from the heart would take hold, setting the foundation for a life of repentance or turning away from sin. Revivalists distinguished true conversion (which was motivated by love of God and hatred of sin) from false conversion (which was motivated by fear of hell).

=== Consolation ===
True conversion meant that a person was among the elect, but even a person with saving faith might doubt his election and salvation. Revivalists taught that assurance of salvation was the product of Christian maturity and sanctification. Converts were encouraged to seek assurance through self-examination of their own spiritual progress. The treatise Religious Affections by Jonathan Edwards was written to help converts examine themselves for the presence of genuine "religious affections" or spiritual desires, such as selfless love of God, certitude in the divine inspiration of the gospel, and other Christian virtues.

It was not enough, however, to simply reflect on past experiences. Revivalists taught that assurance could only be gained by actively seeking to grow in grace and holiness through mortification of sin and using the means of grace. In Religious Affections, the last sign addressed by Edwards was "Christian practice", and it was this sign to which he gave the most space in his treatise. The search for assurance required conscious effort on the part of a convert and took months or even years to achieve.

== Social effects ==
=== Women ===
The Awakening played a major role in the lives of women, though they were rarely allowed to preach or take leadership roles. A deep sense of religious enthusiasm encouraged women, especially to analyze their feelings, share them with other women, and write about them. They became more independent in their decisions, as in the choice of a husband. This introspection led many women to keep diaries or write memoirs. The autobiography of Hannah Heaton (1721–1794), a farm wife of North Haven, Connecticut, tells of her experiences in the Great Awakening, her encounters with Satan, her intellectual and spiritual development, and daily life on the farm.

Phillis Wheatley was the first published black female poet, and she was converted to Christianity as a child after she was brought to America. Her beliefs were overt in her works; she describes the journey of being taken from a Pagan land to be exposed to Christianity in the colonies in a poem entitled "On Being Brought from Africa to America." Wheatley became so influenced by the revivals and especially George Whitefield that she dedicated a poem to him after his death in which she referred to him as an "Impartial Saviour". Sarah Osborn adds another layer to the role of women during the Awakening. She was a Rhode Island schoolteacher, and her writings offer a glimpse into the spiritual and cultural upheaval of the time period, including a 1743 memoir, various diaries and letters, and her anonymously published The Nature, Certainty and Evidence of True Christianity (1753).

=== African Americans ===
The First Great Awakening led to changes in Americans' understanding of God, themselves, the world around them, and religion. In the southern Tidewater and Low Country, northern Baptist and Methodist preachers converted both white and black people. Some were enslaved at their time of conversion, while others were free. Caucasians began to welcome dark-skinned individuals into their churches, taking their religious experiences seriously while also admitting them to active roles in congregations as exhorters, deacons, and even preachers, although the last was a rarity.

The message of spiritual equality appealed to many enslaved people, and, as African religious traditions continued to decline in North America, black people accepted Christianity in large numbers for the first time.

Evangelical leaders in the southern colonies had to deal with the issue of slavery more frequently than those in the North. Still, many leaders of the revivals proclaimed that slaveholders should educate enslaved people so that they could become literate and be able to read and study the Bible. Many Africans were finally provided with some sort of education.

George Whitefield's sermons reiterated an egalitarian message but only translated into spiritual equality for Africans in the colonies, who mostly remained enslaved. Whitefield was known to criticize slaveholders who treated enslaved people cruelly and those who did not educate them, but he had no intention to abolish slavery. He lobbied to have slavery reinstated in Georgia and proceeded to become a slaveholder himself. Whitefield shared a common belief held among evangelicals that, after conversion, slaves would be granted true equality in heaven. Despite his stance on slavery, Whitefield became influential among many Africans.

Samuel Davies was a Presbyterian minister who later became the fourth president of Princeton University. He was noted for preaching to African enslaved people who converted to Christianity in unusually large numbers, and he is credited with the first sustained proselytization of enslaved people in Virginia. Davies wrote a letter in 1757 in which he refers to the religious zeal of an enslaved man whom he had encountered during his journey. "I am a poor slave, brought into a strange country, where I never expect to enjoy my liberty. While I lived in my own country, I knew nothing of that Jesus I have heard you speak so much about. I lived quite careless what will become of me when I die; but I now see such a life will never do, and I come to you, Sir, that you may tell me some good things, concerning Jesus Christ, and my Duty to GOD, for I am resolved not to live any more as I have done."

Davies became accustomed to hearing such excitement from many black people who were exposed to the revivals. He believed that black people could attain knowledge equal to that of white people if given an adequate education, and he promoted the importance of allowing slaveholders to permit enslaved people to become literate so that they could become more familiar with the instructions of the Bible.

The emotional worship of the revivals appealed to many Africans, and African leaders started to emerge from the revivals in substantial numbers soon after they converted. These figures paved the way for the establishment of the first black congregations and churches in the American colonies. Before the American Revolution, the first black Baptist churches were founded in the South in Virginia, South Carolina, and Georgia; two black Baptist churches were founded in Petersburg, Virginia.

== Scholarly interpretation ==
The idea of a "great awakening" has been contested by historian Jon Butler as vague and exaggerated. He suggested that historians abandon the term Great Awakening because the 18th-century revivals were only regional events that occurred in only half of the American colonies, and their effects on American religion and society were minimal. Historians have debated whether the Awakening had a political impact on the American Revolution, which took place soon after. Alan Heimert sees a major impact, but most historians think it had only a minor impact.

== See also ==
- Christian revival

== Bibliography ==
- Ahlstrom, Sydney E. (2004) [1972]. A Religious History of the American People (2nd ed.). Yale University Press. ISBN 0-385-11164-9.
- Bebbington, David W. (1989). Evangelicalism in Modern Britain: A History from the 1730s to the 1980s. Routledge. ISBN 0-415-10464-5.
- Brekus, Catherine A. (1998). Strangers & Pilgrims: Female Preaching in America, 1740–1845. University of North Carolina Press. ISBN 978-0-8078-2441-2.
- Brekus, Catherine A. (2013). Sarah Osborn's World: The Rise of Evangelical Christianity in Early America. Yale University Press. ISBN 978-0-300-18832-5.
- Brooks, Walter Henderson (2000) [1910]. The Silver Bluff Church: A History of Negro Baptist Churches in America (electronic ed.). University of North Carolina at Chapel Hill. Archived from the original on 2021-06-08.
- Butler, Jon (September 1982). "Enthusiasm Described and Decried: The Great Awakening as Interpretative Fiction". Journal of American History. 69 (2): 305–325. doi:10.2307/1893821. JSTOR 1893821.
- ——— (1990). Awash in a Sea of Faith: Christianizing the American People. Studies in Cultural History. Harvard University Press. ISBN 978-0-674-05601-5.
- Butler, Jon; Wacker, Grant; Balmer, Randall (2003). Religion in American Life: A Short History. Oxford University Press. ISBN 978-0-19-983269-9.
- Caldwell, Robert W. III (2017). Theologies of the American Revivalists: From Whitefield to Finney. InterVarsity Press. ISBN 978-0-8308-5164-5.
- Campbell, Ted A. (1996). Christian Confessions: A Historical Introduction. Westminster John Knox Press. ISBN 978-0-664-25650-0.
- Goff, Philip; Heimert, Alan (December 1998). "Revivals and Revolution: Historiographic Turns Since Alan Heimert's Religion and the American Mind". Church History. 67 (4): 695–721. doi:10.2307/3169849. JSTOR 3169849. S2CID 162370757.
- Heimert, Alan (1966). Religion and the American Mind: From the Great Awakening to the Revolution. Harvard University Press.
- Hylson-Smith, Kenneth (1992). Evangelicals in the Church of England, 1734–1984. Bloomsbury.
- Kee, Howard C.; Frost, Jerry W.; Albu, Emily; Lindberg, Carter; Robert, Dana L. (1998). Christianity: A Social and Cultural History (2nd ed.). Upper Saddle River, New Jersey: Prentice Hall. ISBN 0-13-578071-3.
- Kidd, Thomas S. (2007). The Great Awakening: The Roots of Evangelical Christianity in Colonial America. Yale University Press. ISBN 978-0-300-11887-2.
- ——— (2008). The Great Awakening: A Brief History with Documents. Bedford Series in History and Culture. Bedford/ St. Martin's. ISBN 978-0-312-45225-4.
- Lacey, Barbara E. (April 1988). "The World of Hannah Heaton: The Autobiography of an Eighteenth-Century Connecticut Farm Woman". William and Mary Quarterly. 45 (2). Omohundro Institute of Early American History and Culture: 280–304. doi:10.2307/1922328. JSTOR 1922328.
- Lambert, Frank (Winter 2002). "'I Saw the Book Talk': Slave Readings of the First Great Awakening". The Journal of African American History. 87 (1): 12–25. doi:10.1086/JAAHv87n1p12. JSTOR 1562488. S2CID 142221704.
- Matthews, Glenna (1992). The Rise of Public Woman: Woman's Power and Woman's Place in the United States, 1630–1970. Oxford University Press. ISBN 978-0-19-995131-4.
- Noll, Mark A. (2004), The Rise of Evangelicalism: The Age of Edwards, Whitefield and the Wesleys, Inter-Varsity, ISBN 1-84474-001-3
- Smith, John Howard (2015). The First Great Awakening: Redefining Religion in British America, 1725–1775. Fairleigh Dickinson University Press. ISBN 978-1-61147-714-6.
- Stout, Harry (1991). The Divine Dramatist: George Whitefield and the Rise of Modern Evangelicalism. Library of Religious Biography. William B. Eerdmans Publishing Company. ISBN 978-0-8028-0154-8.
- Sweeney, Douglas A. (2005). The American Evangelical Story: A History of the Movement. Baker Academic. ISBN 978-1-58558-382-9.
- Taylor, Alan (2001). American Colonies: The Settling of North America. Penguin Books. ISBN 978-0-14-200210-0.
- Winiarski, Douglas L. (2005). "Jonathan Edwards, Enthusiast? Radical Revivalism and the Great Awakening in the Connecticut Valley". Church History. 74 (4): 683–739. doi:10.1017/s0009640700100861. JSTOR 27644661. S2CID 162865349.
