= The Freedom of the Will =

Book by Jonathan Edwards

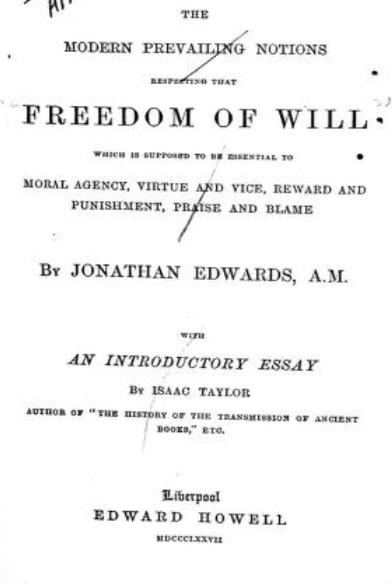
- Author: Jonathan Edwards
- Subject: Theology
- Publication date: 1754
- Publication place: United States

An Inquiry into the Modern Prevailing Notions of the Freedom of the Will which is Supposed to be Essential to Moral Agency, Virtue and Vice, Reward and Punishment, Praise and Blame or simply The Freedom of the Will, is a work by Christian reformer, theologian, and author Jonathan Edwards which uses the text of Romans 9:16 as its basis. It was first published in 1754 and examines the nature and the status of humanity's will. The book takes the classic Calvinist viewpoint on total depravity of the will and the need of humanity for God's grace in salvation.

== Similarities to the open theism debate ==
Although written long before the modern introduction and debate over Open Theism, Edwards' work addresses many of the concerns that have been raised today over this view.

== Views on predisposition ==
One of the authors that provoked the writing of The Freedom of the Will was Daniel Whitby. Whitby was an Arminian minister of the Church of England who was known for his anti-Calvinist viewpoint and his statement that “It is better to deny prescience [foreknowledge] than liberty.” It is this claim that Edwards attempts to answer in The Freedom of the Will. Edwards responded that a person may freely choose whatever seems good, but that whatever it is that seems good is based on an inherent predisposition that has been foreordained by God.

== See also ==
- A Faithful Narrative
- Religious Affections
