= A Faithful Narrative of the Surprising Work of God =

Essay about Christian conversion

A Faithful Narrative
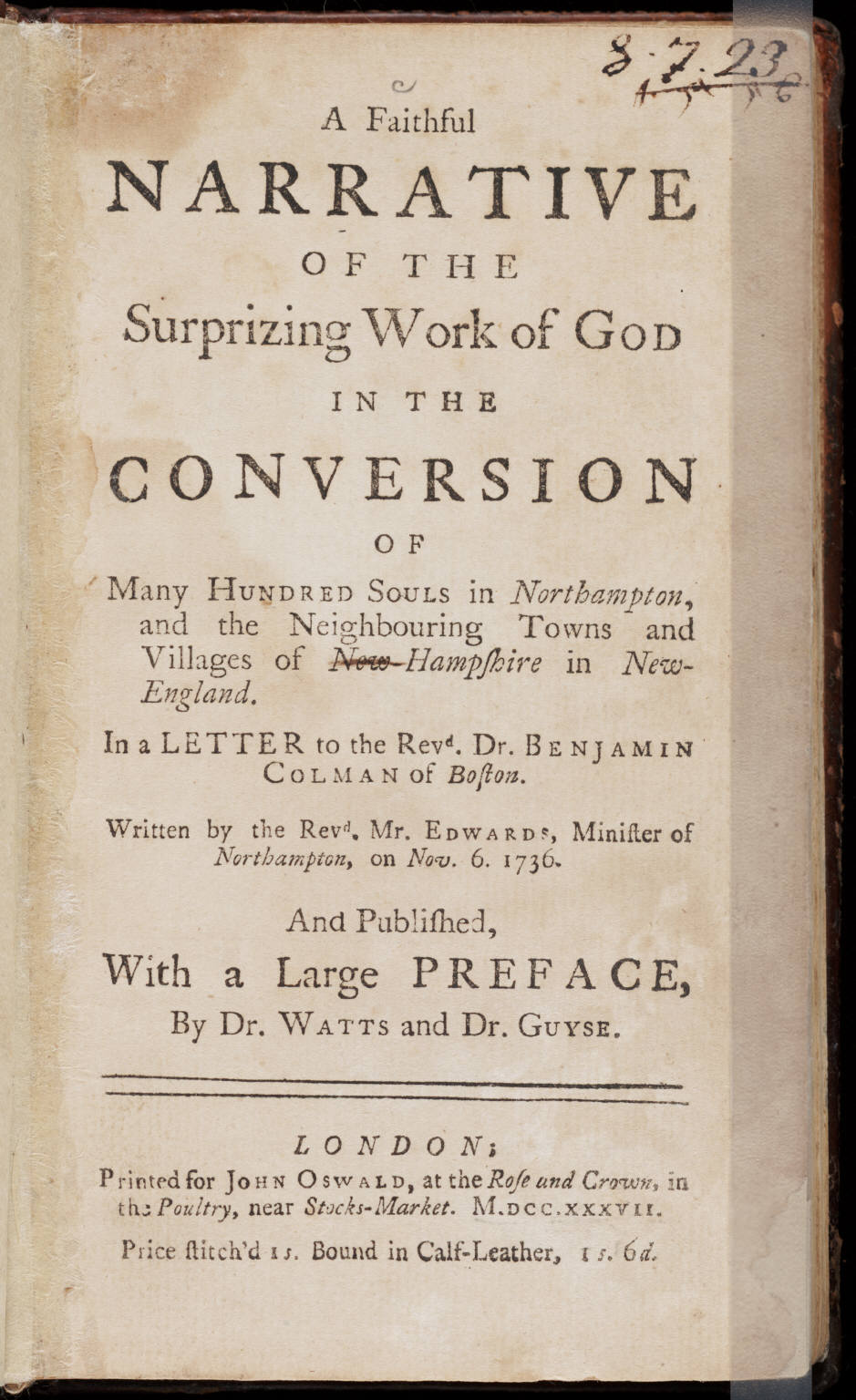
- Author: Jonathan Edwards
- Original title: A Faithful Narrative of the Surprizing Work of God by Jonathan Edwards 1737
- Language: English
- Subject: Christian conversion
- Genre: Historical narrative
- Published: 1737
- Publication place: British American Colonies

A Faithful Narrative of the Surprising Work of God in the Conversion of Many Hundred Souls in Northampton is an essay written in 1737 by Jonathan Edwards about the process of Christian conversion in Northampton, Massachusetts, during the Great Awakening, which emanated from Edwards' congregation in 1734.

== Analysis ==
Edwards wrote the Narrative to dispel rumors and to clarify how conversion to Christianity occurs. Edwards gives a background of the town and its relatively mundane history prior to the Awakening of 1734.

In the book, Edwards describes God's grace by using examples of various people from his local congregation, such as Abigail Hutchinson, a young woman who died joyfully. These examples illustrate the psychology of conversion by grace. He outlines several universal steps in conversion:

- First, Edwards explains how the conversion starts when individuals with an interest in Christianity attempt to live righteously through their good works and study scripture attempting to avoid sin and damnation and to "earn" salvation.
- Next, Edwards describes how these individuals inevitably fail to live up to the Old Testament legalist standard, and they experience despair at their failures and inherent sinfulness, often believing they have committed "the unpardonable sin."
- Then, Edwards describes how successful converts experience "converting grace" and "awaken" to see that forgiveness is available to all who have faith that Jesus' sacrifice atones for all sins. This salvation is impossible through works which are simply evidence of faith, and only possible through Christ's sacrifice.
- Finally, this revelation of grace is followed by a sense of joy or an internal "new light" from the Holy Spirit and a desire to spread the Christian gospel and leave sin behind. Also, true converts experience a greater sensitivity to their "heart sins", such as pride and judging others, sins with which they were largely unconcerned before conversion when they were primarily concerned with legalism or their own "saving" works. Even though this change has occurred, many Christians "have no imagination that they are now converted."

== History and impact ==
Edwards published the Narrative in England in 1737, Boston in 1738, and later in German and Dutch, and it brought him a large international following. Prominent Christians such as George Whitefield, a British minister, came to visit Edwards in Northampton after the publication.

The Narrative remains popular and modern day evangelists such as Timothy Keller often refer to this and other Edwards works as models for their ministry. The song "Amazing Grace", written in 1772, is sometimes compared to the "grace experience" described in A Faithful Narrative.
