= Religious Affections =

1746 book by Jonathan Edwards

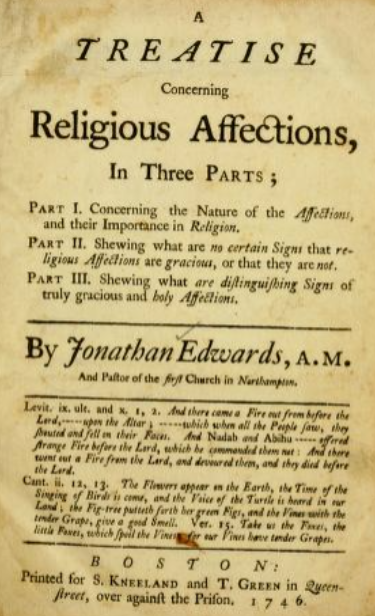
- Title page for A Treatise Concerning Religious Affections (1746)
- Author: Jonathan Edwards
- Subject: Theology
- Publication date: 1746
- Publication place: United States

A Treatise Concerning Religious Affections is a publication written in 1746 by Jonathan Edwards describing his philosophy about the process of Christian conversion in Northampton, Massachusetts, during the First Great Awakening, which emanated from Edwards' congregation starting in 1734.

== Analysis ==
Edwards wrote the Treatise to explain how true religious conversion to Christianity occurs. Edwards describes how emotion and intellect both play a role, but "converting grace" is what causes Christians to "awaken" to see that forgiveness is available to all who have faith that Jesus' sacrifice atones for all sins. This salvation is not possible through believers' imperfect good works which are simply evidence of faith, only through Christ's sacrifice which is free to all. Edwards describes the importance of testing new faith and discerning whether it is legitimate. He lays out twelve tests of true conversion, including ways of measuring allegedly fruitful works.

He basically concludes that the fruit of the Spirit are the religious affections, love being the chief affection, and that all other fruit (or Christian virtues) flow from this. "Love is the chief of the affections, and as it were the fountain of them." (p. 76, Banner of Truth Edition). He further says "for it was not by men's having the gifts of the Spirit (referring to spiritual gifts), but by their having the virtues of the Spirit, that they were called spiritual." (p. 127). This is how you can distinguish between carnal men and spiritual men. Carnal men do not produce the fruit of the Spirit, but spiritual men do. So it was with Christ. "All the virtues of the Lamb of God, His humility, patience, meekness, submission, obedience, love and compassion, are exhibited to our view in a manner the most tending to move our affections of any that can be imagined." (p. 53).

== Impact ==
"Religious Affections" remains popular and modern day evangelists and writers such as Tim Keller and John Piper often refer to this and other Edwards works as models for their ministry.

== See also ==
- "Sinners in the Hands of an Angry God"
- A Faithful Narrative
- The Freedom of the Will
