= Edward Lawrence =

Edward Lawrence may refer to:

== Politicians ==
- Edward A. Lawrence (1831–1883), American politician from New York
- Sir Edward Lawrence, 1st Baronet (died 1749), MP for Stockbridge
- Edward Lawrence (MP for Wareham) (c. 1594–1647), MP for Wareham
- Edward Lawrence (Rhode Island politician), see Joseph McNamara

== Religious ==
- Edward Lawrence (minister) (1623–1695), English ejected minister
- Edward A. Lawrence Sr. (1808-1883), American Congregational pastor, professor, author
- Edward A. Lawrence Jr. (1847-1893), American pastor; namesake of Lawrence House (Baltimore)

== Other people ==
- Edward Lawrence (athlete) (1896–?), Canadian middle-distance runner
- Sir Edward Lawrence (merchant) (1825–1909), English merchant
- Edward Lawrence (customs collector), see List of Fellows of the Royal Society elected in 1708
- Edward Lawrence (footballer) for Belize Defence Force FC
- Ed Lawrence (1906–1961), American football player

== Other uses ==
- Edward J. Lawrence, an American schooner

== See also ==
- Edward St. Lawrence, Anglican priest in Ireland
- Eddie Lawrence (1919–2014), American actor
- Eddie Lawrence (footballer) (born 1907), Welsh footballer
