= Leonard Woods (theologian) =

American theologian (1774–1854)

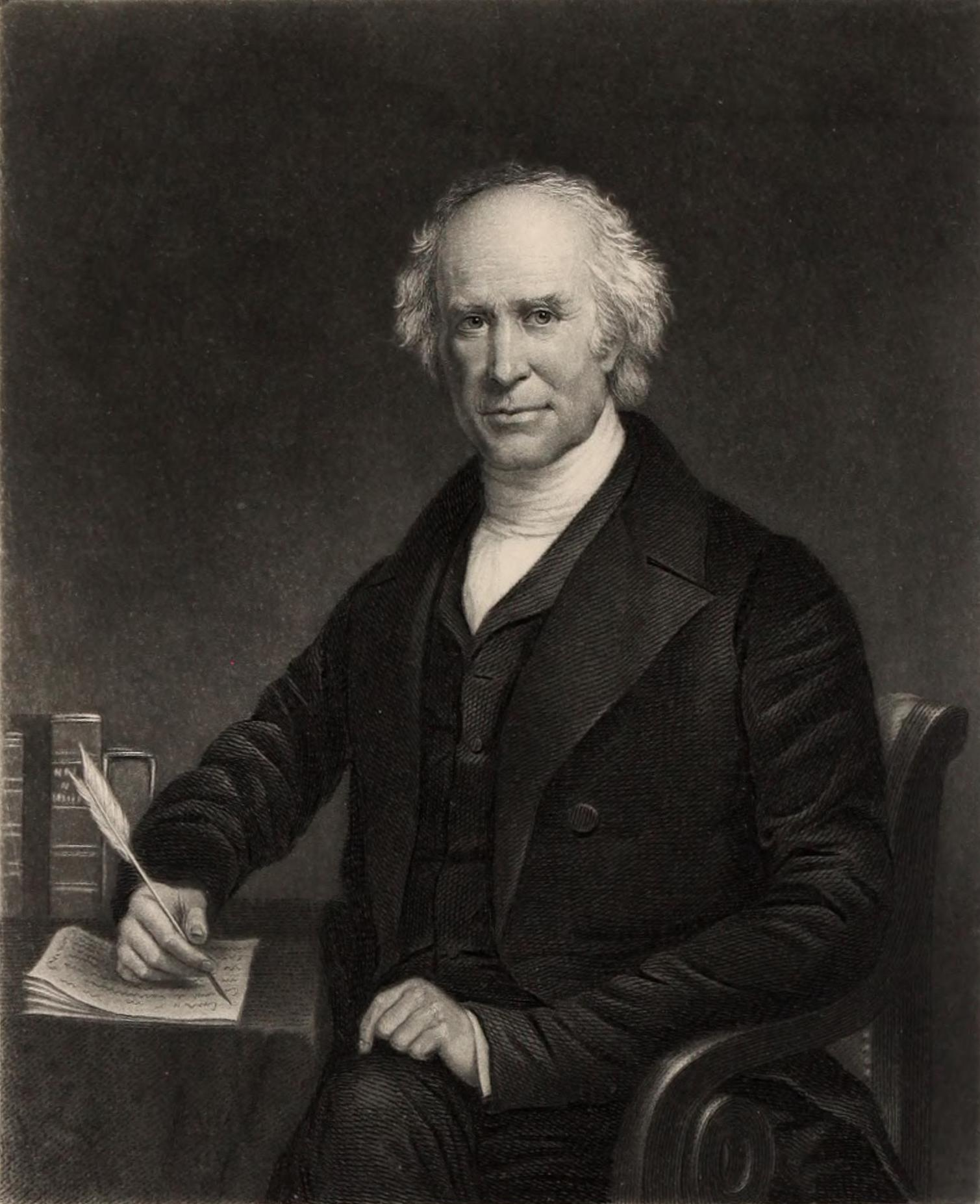
Leonard Woods

Leonard Woods (June 19, 1774 – August 24, 1854) was an American theologian. He was widely known for upholding orthodox Calvinism over Unitarianism.

In 1796, Woods graduated from Harvard, and was soon ordained pastor in 1798 of the Congregational Church at West Newbury, MA. He was the first professor of Andover Theological Seminary and between 1808 and 1846, occupied the seminary's chair of Christian theology. He helped establish several societies including the American Tract Society, the American Education Society, the Temperance Society, and the American Board of Commissioners for Foreign Missions. Woods was elected a Fellow of the American Academy of Arts and Sciences in 1812.

Woods was also an influential and outspoken proponent of slavery in the run-up to the American Civil War. He helped organize a petition drive among ministers to support the Compromise of 1850 and help stamp out antislavery clergy.

His son-in-law, Edward A. Lawrence, Sr., was a pastor, professor, and author. Woods' grandson, Edward A. Lawrence, Jr., was the namesake of Lawrence House Baltimore.

== Works ==
His six primary works are:

- Lectures on the Inspiration of the Scriptures (1829)
- Memoirs of American Missionaries (1833)
- Examination of the Doctrine of Perfection (1841)
- Lectures on Church Government (1843)
- Lectures on Swedenborgianism (1848)
- History of Andover Seminary completed by his son, Leonard Woods, Jr. (1848)
