= Edward A. Lawrence Sr. =

American Congregational pastor and author

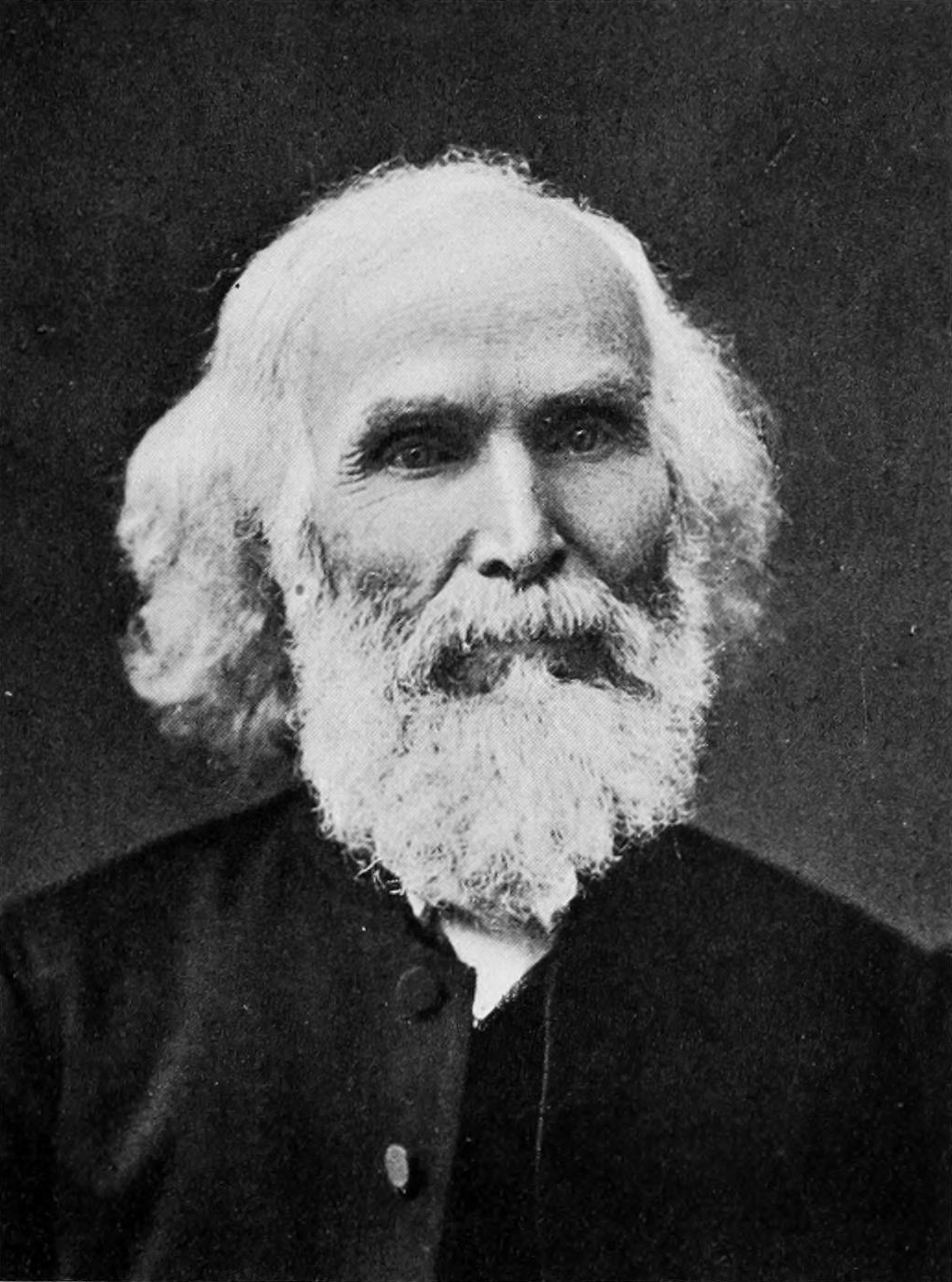
Edward A. Lawrence, Sr.

Edward A. Lawrence, Sr., A.M., D.D. (October 7, 1808 – September 4, 1883) was a 19th-century American Congregational pastor and author. He ministered to congregations in Haverhill, Massachusetts, Marblehead, Massachusetts, and Orford, New Hampshire. He was also a professor of Ecclesiastical History and Pastoral Duty at the Theological Institute of East Windsor, Connecticut, and wrote several publications, books, pamphlets, and essays.

== Biography ==
Edward Alexander Lawrence was born at St. Johnsbury, Vermont, October 7, 1808. His parents were Hubbard and Mary (Goss) Lawrence.

Lawrence graduated from Dartmouth College, 1834, before studying divinity at Andover Theological Seminary, graduating in 1838. Dartmouth conferred the Honorary Doctor of Divinity degree in 1858.

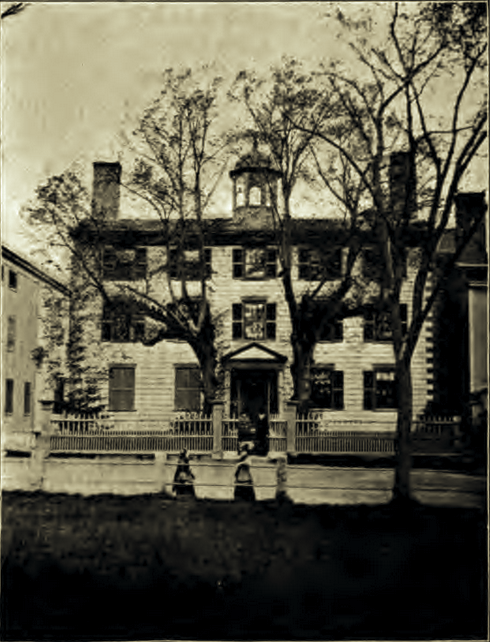
Linden Home, family residence in Marblehead

He taught at Gilmanton Academy from 1834 to 1835. He was ordained pastor of the Congregational Church at Haverhill, Massachusetts, May 4, 1839, serving as pastor, May 8, 1839 – June 12, 1844. He was installed pastor at Marblehead, Massachusetts, serving during the period of April 23, 1845 – July 12, 1854.

Lawrence was inaugurated Professor of Ecclesiastical History and Pastoral Duty at the Theological Institute of East Windsor, Connecticut (now Hartford International University for Religion and Peace at Hartford, Connecticut), July 19, 1854, continuing through 1865. During the period of 1865–68, he was the associate pastor at the Church at Orford, New Hampshire. On November 18, 1868, he was back at Marblehead, as pastor of South Church, until September 1, 1873. In that year, Lawrence was a delegate to the International Peace Convention, Geneva, Switzerland.

Lawrence was the author of at least 15 publications, books and pamphlets. He published several sermons and an Essay on the Mission of the Church.

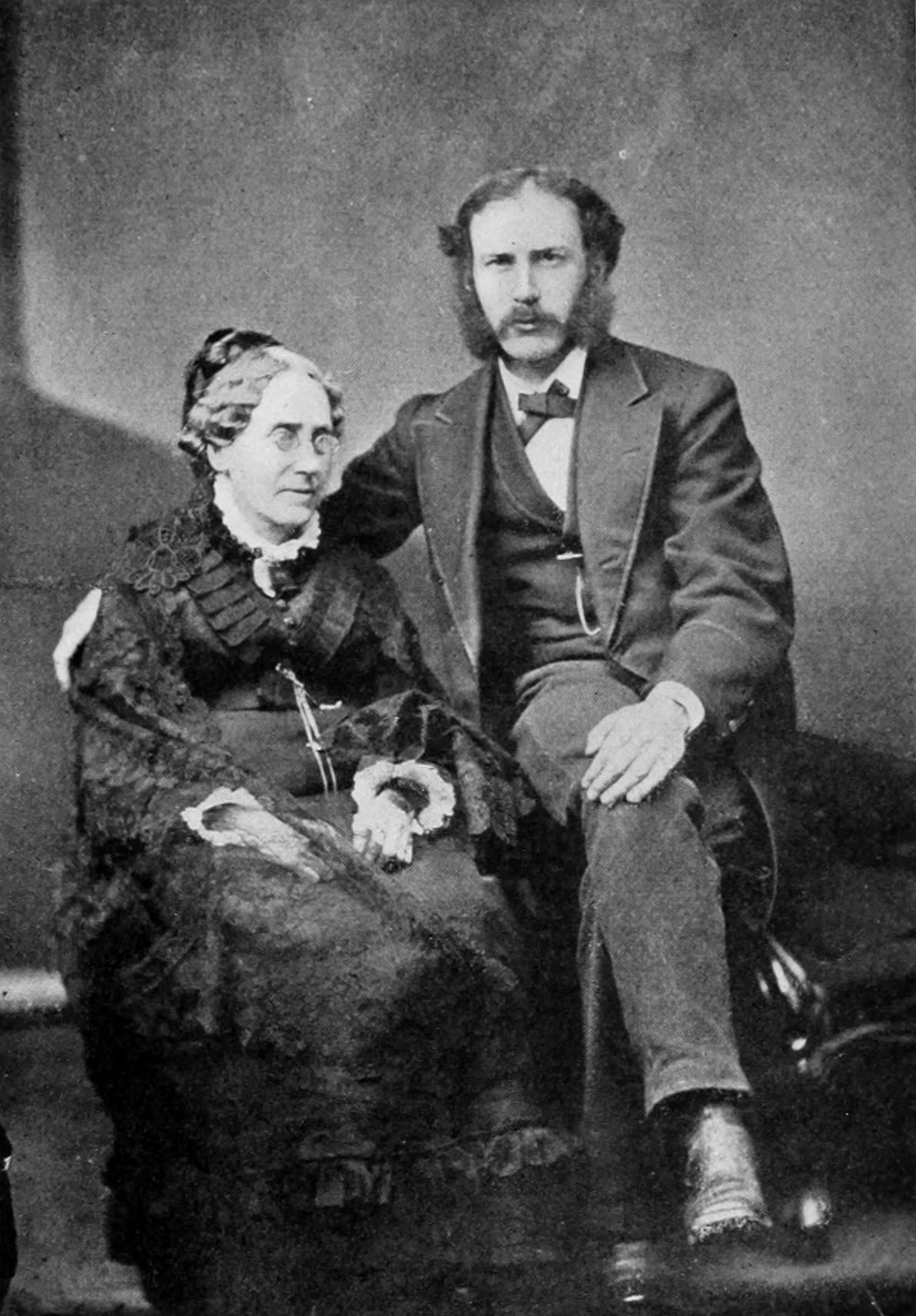
Margaret Oliver Woods Lawrence & Edward A. Lawrence, Jr.

In 1839, he married Margaret Olive, daughter of the Rev. Dr Leonard Woods of Andover Theological Seminary, May 21, 1839. They had four children, three daughters and one son. The son, Edward A. Lawrence, Jr., was the namesake of Lawrence House Baltimore.

Edward Alexander Lawrence, Sr. died of dysentery, September 4, 1883, aged 74 years.

== Selected works ==
- Misinterpretation of providence : a discourse delivered at Marblehead, December, 1846, on the disasters at sea, Sept. 19, 1846 / (Marblehead, Mass. : Mercury Press, 1848)
- A discourse on the death of Hon. Daniel Webster : delivered Oct. 31, 1852 (1852)
- A discourse delivered at the funeral of Rev. Leonard Woods, D.D. : in the chapel of the Theological Seminary, Andover, August 28, 1854 (1854)
- God in the Church the life of its history : an inaugural discourse, delivered July 20, 1854 (1854)
- The mission of the church : or, Systematic beneficence / (New York : American Tract Society, 1859)
- The life of Rev. Joel Hawes, D.D., tenth pastor of the First Church, Hartford, Conn. (Hartford, Hamersley & co., 1871)
- The progress of peace principles : a paper read before the Peace Congress at Geneva, Sept., 1874 / (Boston : Printed by J.F. Farwell, 1875)
- The life of Rev. Joel Hawes, tenth pastor of the First Church, Hartford, Conn. (1881)
- The illuminated valley (1883)
