= Edward A. Lawrence Jr. =

American minister and author (1847–1893)

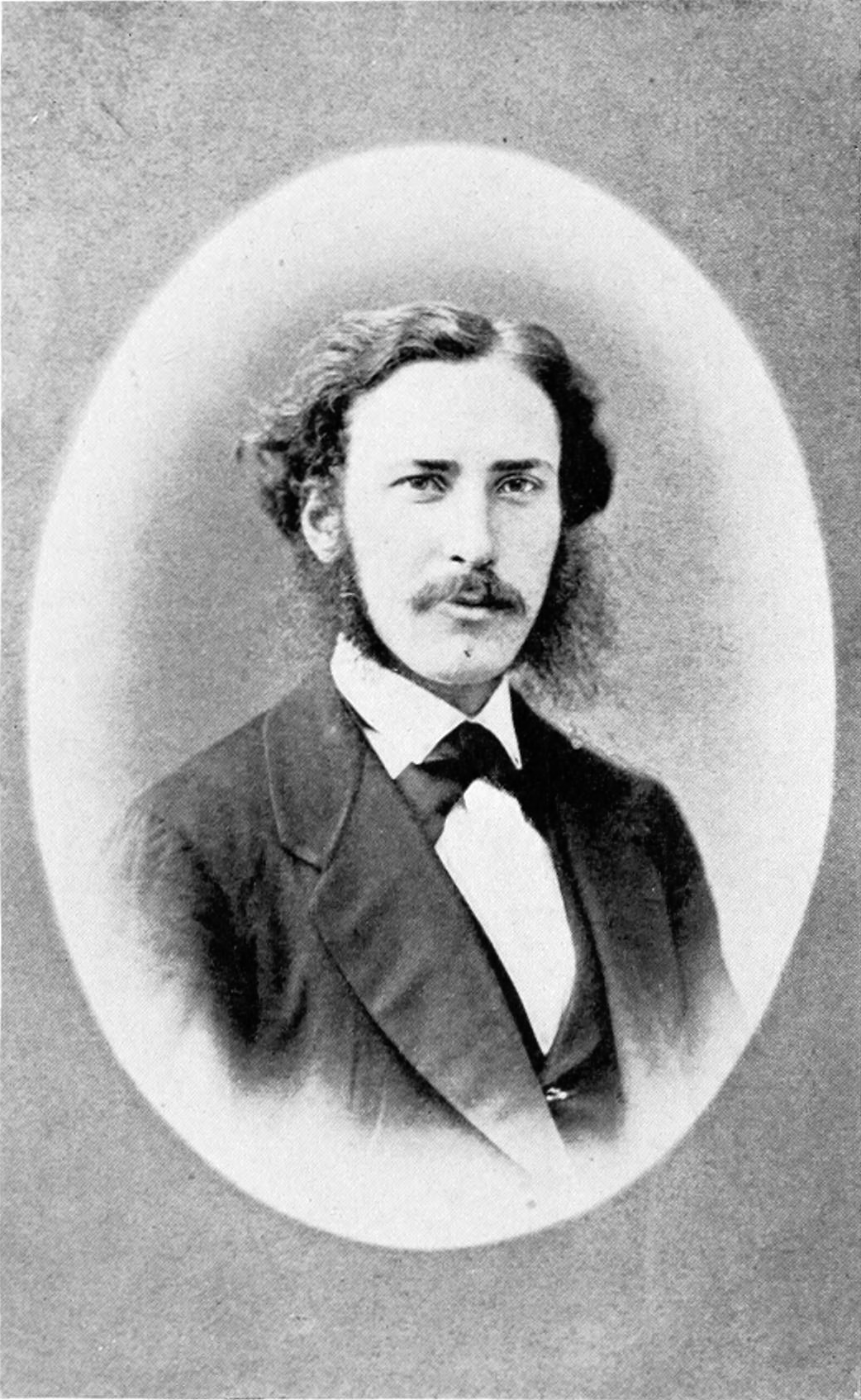
Edward A. Lawrence, Jr.

Edward A. Lawrence, Jr. (January 16, 1847 – November 10, 1893) was an American Protestant pastor and author. He lectured on foreign missions, at Andover, Beloit and New Haven. He was the namesake of Lawrence House Baltimore, a settlement he opened in 1893, months before his death.

== Early life and education ==
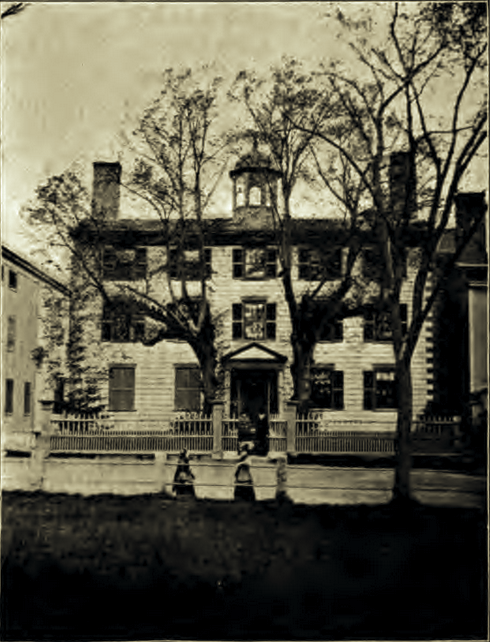
Linden Home, family residence in Marblehead

Edward Alexander Lawrence was born on January 16, 1847, in Marblehead, Massachusetts. He was the only son of the Rev. Dr. Edward A. Lawrence, Sr. and Margaret Oliver (Woods) Lawrence. Margaret's father was the theologian, Rev. Dr. Leonard Woods. Lawrence, Jr. had three sisters.

When he was about eight years old, his father became professor in the Theological Institute of East Windsor, Connecticut (now Hartford International University for Religion and Peace at Hartford, Connecticut).

Lawrence graduated from Yale College in 1868. He began the study of theology at Princeton University, but in the spring of 1869, went to Germany, where he spent two years in further theological study in the University of Halle, and one year in the University of Berlin.

== Career ==
From January to June, 1873, Lawrence was a tutor in German at Yale College, and on July 15, 1873, he was ordained (in St. Albans, Vermont) to the work of the ministry. He then preached for about two years in the Presbyterian Church in Champlain, New York. In September, 1875, he was installed over the Congregational Church in Poughkeepsie, New York. In November 1883, leaving Poughkeepsie, he accepted a call to the Plymouth Congregational Church in Syracuse, New York, and at once began his work with them, although he was not installed until January 29, 1884. On March 23, 1886, he resigned this charge, to undertake a tour around the world for the inspection and study of missions, which occupied him until late in 1887. In 1888–89 he was acting pastor of the Presbyterian Church in Sing Sing, New York. In the meantime, he had delivered a valuable course of lectures on missions in the Andover Theological Seminary, parts of which in other forms were given elsewhere. In May 1889, he was called to the First Congregational Church in Baltimore, Maryland, where he was installed on November 21. He served this church, and was a valuable influence for good in the city.

He received the honorary degree of Doctor of Divinity from Beloit College in June, 1893. (Note: According to the General Council of the Congregational and Christian Churches of the United States (1894), he received the Doctor of Divinity in 1882.)

The beginnings of settlement work in Baltimore were made early in 1893, when Lawrence took up lodgings with his friend, Frank Thompson, in one of the poor districts of that city. Lawrence had no idea of a settlement in the institutional sense of the term, and merely desired a sort of social retreat, where he could change his point of view from that of a leading pastor, and observe at first-hand the conditions and the people of a congested district.

== Death and legacy ==
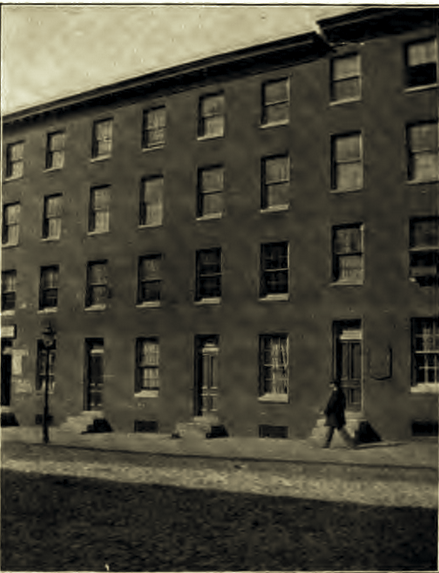
Lawrence House Baltimore

In Baltimore, on November 10, 1893, Edward Alexander Lawrence, Jr. died in office as pastor of Baltimore's First Congregational Church after a week's illness, from peritonitis, at age 46.

Lawrence House Baltimore was named in his memory. In 1900, his mother published Reminiscences of the life and work of Edward A. Lawrence, Jr.

== Selected works ==
- Address at the funeral of Dr. Joseph Tracy (1874)
- The progress of peace principles : a paper read before the Peace Congress at Geneva, Sept., 1874 (1875)
- Does "everlasting punishment" last forever? (1879)
- National righteousness : a sermon preached at a Union Thanksgiving Service, November 24, 1881 (1881)
- Modern missions in the East; their methods, successes, and limitations (1894)
