= Andover Theological Seminary =

Theological seminary in Massachusetts, US

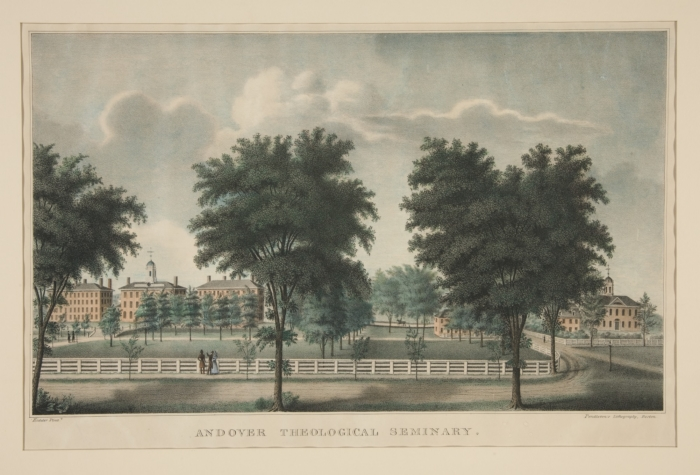
A portrait of Andover Theological Seminary in Andover, Massachusetts, now on display at the Yale University Art Gallery in New Haven, Connecticut

Andover Theological Seminary (1807–1965) was a Congregationalist seminary founded in 1807 and originally located in Andover, Massachusetts on the campus of Phillips Academy.

From 1908 to 1931, it was located at Harvard University in Cambridge, Massachusetts. It then collocated with Newton Theological Institution (NTI) in Newton, Massachusetts. Then, in 1965, Andover Theological Seminary and NTI formally merged in 1965 to form Andover Newton Theological School in Newton, Massachusetts. In its original and merged forms, it is the first and thus the oldest Protestant theological seminary in the United States. The seminary continues as Andover Newton Seminary at Yale Divinity School, which was launched in 2017.

== History ==
Andover Theological Seminary traces its roots to the late 18th century and the desire for a well-educated clergy among Congregationalists in the United States. That desire was expressed in the founding of Phillips Academy in 1778 for "the promotion of true Piety and Virtue".

In 1806, a growing split within the Congregational churches, known as the Unitarian Controversy, came to a full boil on the campus of Harvard College. The Hollis Chair of Divinity sat empty at Harvard for two years owing to tensions between liberal and more orthodox Calvinists. This theological battle soon divided many of the oldest churches in Massachusetts and began to impact church polity and the hiring of ministers. When the Harvard Board of Overseers appointed well-known liberal Henry Ware to the Hollis Chair in 1805, the Calvinists withdrew to organize and establish a new school in 1807, Andover Theological Seminary on the campus of Phillips Academy (est. 1778) in Andover, Massachusetts. This act, covered widely in the national press, was one of the significant events that contributed to the split in the denomination and to the eventual founding of the American Unitarian Association in 1825 (which joined the Universalists, founded in 1793, to become the Unitarian Universalist Association in 1961).

Andover was founded by the joint efforts of traditionalist, "Old Calvinists" and the adherents of the New Divinity (also known as New England theology) which was more revivalistic. Leonard Woods, Moses Stuart, and Edward Dorr Griffin were early faculty.

Between 1886 and 1892, a theological dispute known as the "Andover Controversy" broke out between the conservative "New England Calvinism" of the founders and the liberal theology of many on the faculty. President E. C. Smyth was investigated and dismissed for his liberal views in 1887, but in 1891 his dismissal was reversed, on technical grounds, by the Massachusetts Supreme Court, and the matter was dropped the following year.

=== Relocations and merger ===
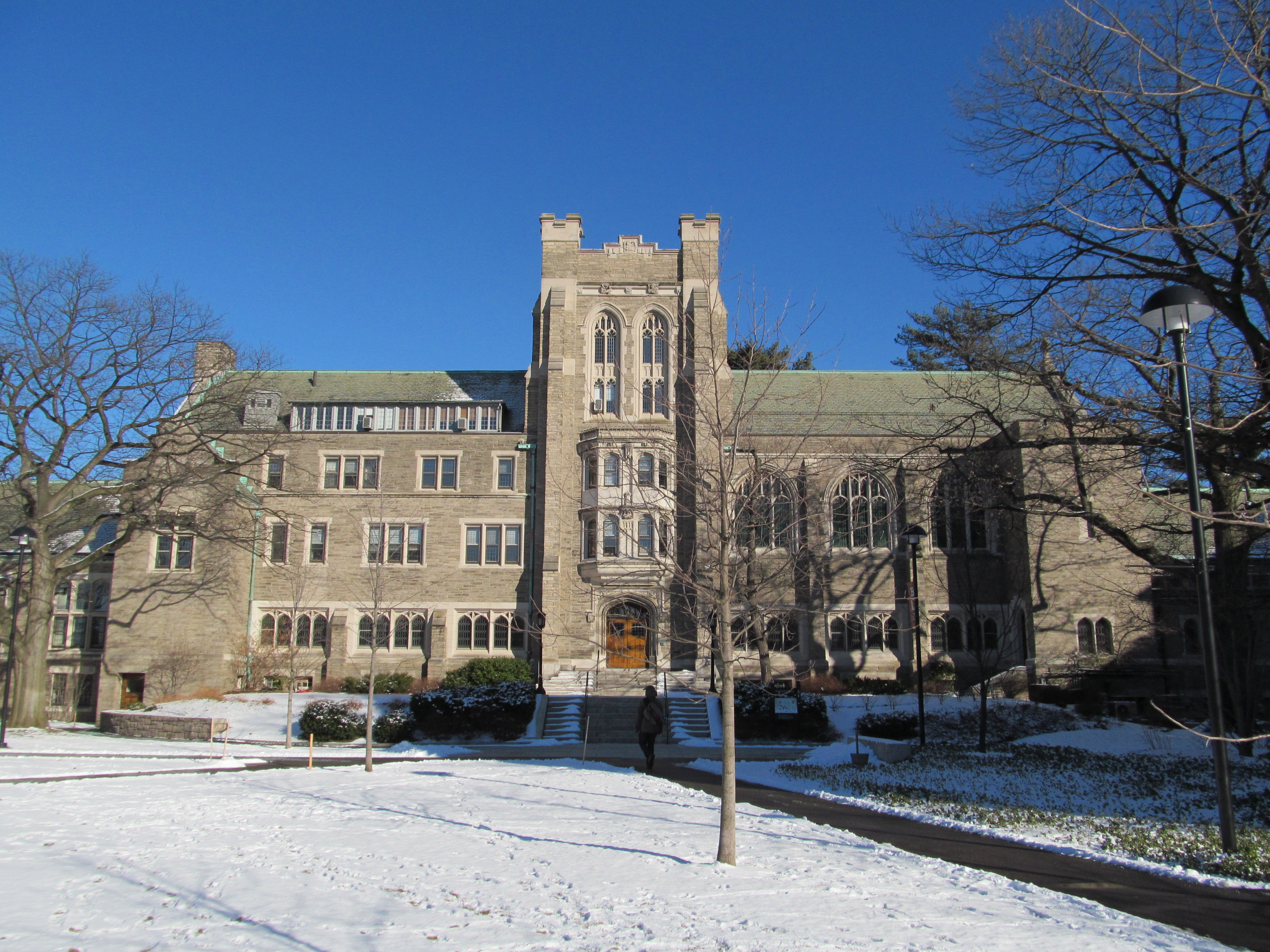
Andover Hall at Harvard Divinity School

In 1908, Harvard Divinity School and Andover attempted to reconcile, and the seminary moved its faculty and library to the Harvard campus (and soon into Andover Hall [1911]). Plans for a formal affiliation between the academies were made, but the Supreme Judicial Court of Massachusetts disallowed the alliance since Andover's endowment is designated for a Christian theological education. Andover, therefore, relocated to the campus of Newton Theological Institution in 1931.

Andover Theological Seminary and the Newton Theological Institution formally merged in 1965 as the Andover Newton Theological School (ANTS). Newton Theological Institution began instruction in 1825 at Newton Centre, Massachusetts as a graduate seminary formally affiliated with the group now known as American Baptist Churches USA, the oldest Baptist denomination in America. As the institution developed, it adopted Andover's curricular pattern and shared the same theological tradition of loyalty to the evangelical Gospel and zeal for its dissemination.

In November 2015, ANTS announced that it would sell its campus and relocate to Yale Divinity School, after a presence of 190 years on that site.

=== Historical influence on Protestant missions ===
Prior to the founding of Andover and Newton, the model for the training of clergy was based on an undergraduate degree (actually the basis for the founding of most of the early colleges in the United States). The graduate model and the three year curriculum with a resident student body and resident faculty pioneered at Andover and Newton has become the standard for almost all of the 140 Protestant theological schools in the country.

Reflecting that zeal, the modern missionary movement began in this country through a group of Andover students known as the Brethren. Both Andover and Newton quickly assumed leadership in the modern mission movement, drawing the two schools into close association of people and ideas. Graduates such as Luther Rice and Hiram Bingham pioneered in Christian missions around the world. Adoniram Judson, an 1810 Andover alumnus, is best known for his work in Burma, where he translated the Bible into Burmese and produced the first Burmese-English dictionary.

== Notable alumni ==
Alumni of Andover Theological Seminary include the following notables, listed in order of their last year at the Seminary.

- Adoniram Judson, class of 1810, one of the first U.S. missionaries sent by the American Board of Commissioners for Foreign Missions; later became a Baptist missionary to Myanmar, then known as Burma.
- Thomas Hopkins Gallaudet, class of 1814.
- Hiram Bingham, class of 1816, leader of the first group of missionaries to Hawaii; helped devise the first alphabet for the Hawaiian language.
- David Brown, attended 1823, member of the Cherokee Nation, author of "Address in Favor of the Aboriginal Inhabitants of North America"
- Samuel Worcester, class of 1823, American pastor and Cherokee missionary; plaintiff in the Worcester v. Georgia Supreme Court case.
- David Oliver Allen, class of 1824, American missionary.
- Walter Colton, class of 1825, U.S. Navy chaplain, first American alcalde (mayor) of Monterey, California, co-publisher of California's first newspaper
- John William Yeomans, class of 1827, Presbyterian pastor and second president of Lafayette College
- Nehemiah Adams, class of 1829, clergyman and author.
- Bela Bates Edwards, class of 1830, Andover Theological Seminary faculty, 1837–1852; editor of American Quarterly Observer, Biblical Repository, and Bibliotheca Sacra.
- William Adams, class of 1830, one of the founders of the Union Theological Seminary in the City of New York and later its president.
- Asher Wright, class of 1831, missionary to the Seneca people, and a linguist who developed a Seneca alphabet and translated large portions of the bible and other texts.
- Caleb Mills, class of 1833, first professor of Wabash College and father of the Indiana public education system.
- Samuel Francis Smith, class of 1834, Baptist minister who wrote the words to "My Country, 'Tis of Thee" while a seminary student.
- Samuel Harvey Taylor, class of 1837, 6th Principal of Phillips Academy 1837–1871
- Edward A. Lawrence, Sr., class of 1838, Congregational pastor, professor, author
- George Frederick Magoun, class of 1847, co-founder and first president of Grinnell College
- George Park Fisher, class of 1851, ecclesiastical historian, president of the American Historical Association in 1898
- William True Sleeper, class of 1858, clergyman and hymn writer
- Charles Augustus Aiken, class of 1853, Faculty at Dartmouth College and Princeton Theological Seminary; president of Union College.
- Laurenus Clark Seelye, attended 1858-59, first president of Smith College
- George Washburn (educator), class of 1859, professor of philosophy (1886), acting president (1870-1877) and later president (1877) of Robert College, Constantinople (now Istanbul), founding principal of American College, Madurai (1881).
- Henry F. C. Nichols, class of 1864, member of the Wisconsin State Assembly
- William Jewett Tucker, class of 1866, Andover Theological Seminary faculty, 1879-1893; editor of Andover Review; founder of Andover House; president of Dartmouth College.
- James Griswold Merrill, class of 1866, president of Fisk University (1901-1908). He graduated from Amherst College.
- George Trumbull Ladd (1842 – 1921), class of 1869, was an American philosopher, educator and psychologist. He was the first foreigner to receive the Second (conferred in 1907) and Third (conferred in 1899) Orders of the Rising Sun.
- Joseph Hardy Neesima, attended 1870-72, 1873–74, but did not graduate. Founder and president of Doshisha University in Japan.
- Albert Edward Winship, educator
- William Scott Ament, class of 1877, controversial Congregational missionary to China criticised by Mark Twain
- Thomas Davidson Christie, class of 1877, Civil War Veteran, missionary in Turkey, President of St. Paul's College in Tarsus, papers at MNHS.org
- Claude Black, class of 1943, noted pastor of Mt. Zion First Baptist Church, civil rights icon, politician.
