= James Griswold Merrill =

American minister (c. 1840-1920)

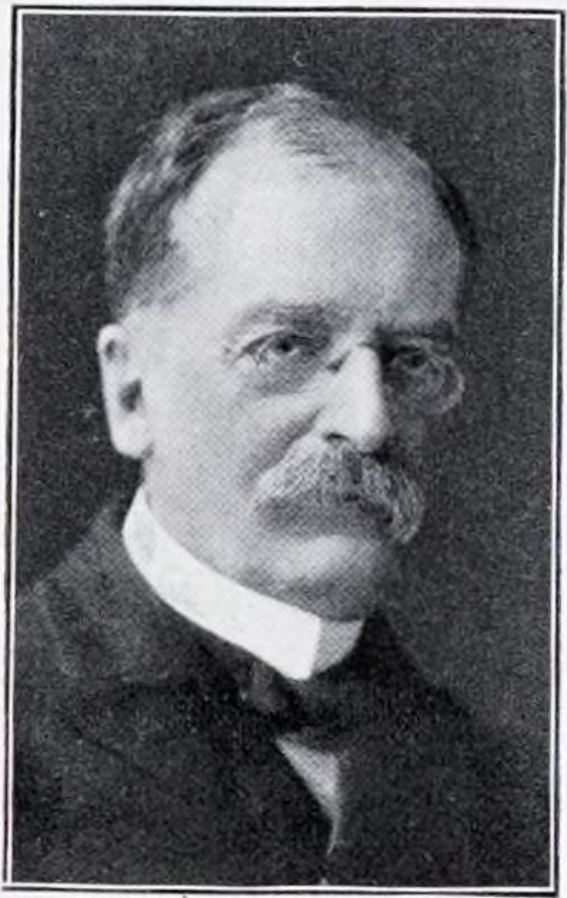
- James Griswold Merrill, c. 1910
- Born: 1839 or 1840; Montague, Massachusetts, U.S.
- Died: December 22, 1920 (aged 80); Mountain Lakes, New Jersey, U.S.
- Resting place: Andover, Massachusetts, U.S.
- Education: Amherst College; Princeton Theological Seminary; Andover Theological Seminary
- Spouse: Louisa W. Boutwell
- Children: Lucia Griswold Merrill, Oliver Boutwell Merrill, Mary Perley Merrill, William Fessenden Merrill

James Griswold Merrill (c. 1840–1920) was an American Congregational minister and university administrator. He was the second president of Fisk University, a historically black university in Nashville, Tennessee, from 1901 to 1908.

== Early life ==
James Griswold Merrill was born in Montague, Massachusetts. He graduated from Phillips Academy Andover and Amherst College. He subsequently attended the Princeton Theological Seminary from 1863 to 1864, and graduated from the Andover Theological Seminary in 1866.

== Career ==
Merrill was a Congregational minister in Iowa, Kansas, St. Louis, Missouri, Portland, Maine and Somerset, Massachusetts. He retired as minister after serving in Lake Helen, Florida from 1912 to 1917. In Portland, Maine from 1894 to 1899, he was also the editor of The Christian Mirror.

Merrill was the acting president of Fisk University, a historically black university in Nashville, Tennessee, from 1899 to 1901, and its second president from 1901 to 1908. An article in The Nashville Globe noted that he spent most of his time fundraising away from Nashville. It also explained, "Dr. Merrill's interest in the education of the Negro springs not from a love of the Negro as a Negro, but from the love of the Negro as one of God's children; and this is simple Christianity."

== Personal life and death ==
Merrill married Louisa W. Boutwell. He died on December 22, 1920, in Mountain Lakes, New Jersey. He was buried in Andover, Massachusetts.

== Selected works ==
- Merrill, James Griswold (1878). Twenty-five Sermons to the Children of the Congregational Church, Davenport, Iowa. Davenport, Iowa: Egbert, Fidlar & Cambers. OCLC 32955088.
- Bruce, Roscoe Conkling; Du Bois, W. E. B.; Frissell, H. B.; Frost, William G.; Merrill, James G.; Miller, Kelly; Ogden, Robert C. (1908). From Servitude to Service: Being the Old South Lectures on the History and Work of Southern Institutions for the Education of the Negro. Boston, Massachusetts: Sherman, French & Co. OCLC 36744138.
