= William True Sleeper =

American clergyman, educator, and hymn-writer (1819–1904)

William T. Sleeper
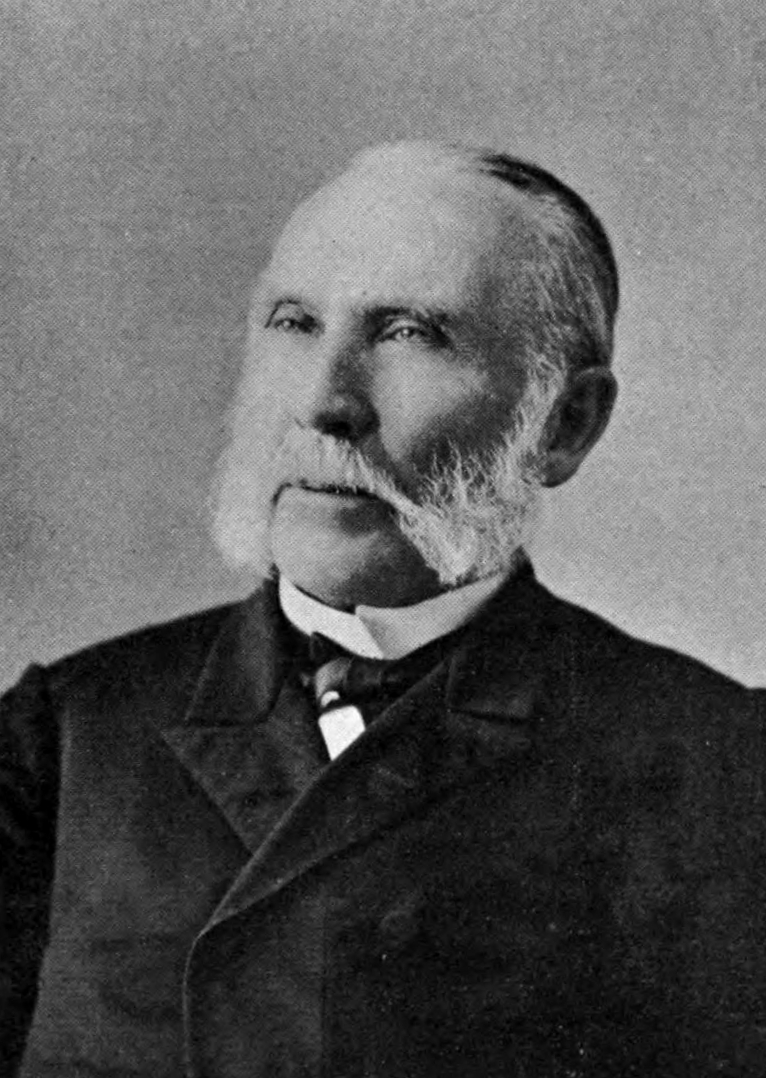
- Born: February 9, 1819; Danbury, New Hampshire
- Died: September 24, 1904 (aged 85); Auburndale, Massachusetts
- Other names: W. T. Sleeper
- Notable work: "Jesus, I Come" "Ye Must Be Born Again"
- Spouse: Emily Eliza Taylor (1829-1898)

William True Sleeper (February 9, 1819 - September 24, 1904) was an American Congregationalist clergyman, educator, poet, and hymn-writer.

William Sleeper was born in Danbury, New Hampshire on February 9, 1819 to Johnathan and Mary Sleeper. He attended the Phillips Exeter Academy for preparatory school in Exeter, New Hampshire, and then graduated from the University of Vermont in 1850 and from Andover Theological Seminary in 1858. Sleeper and his wife Emily both taught at Woodman Sanbornton Academy before his ordination. After ordination on June 29, 1854, he did missionary work in Worcester, Massachusetts and was Chaplain of the State Reform School for Boys from 1856 to 1860. He held a number of positions around Massachusetts and Maine, and was involved in the establishment of three churches in Patten, Sherman, and Fort Fairfield, Maine. In 1876, he returned to Worcester where he preached for 30 years. Sleeper also served as supervisor of schools in Aroostook County from 1868 to 1871, president of the Aroostook Valley Railroad in 1874, and established and edited the periodicals The Voice and The North Star.

Sleeper published a book of poems in 1883, which included two which would later become hymns: "Jesus, I Come" (also known as "Out of My Bondage, Sorrow and Night") and "Ye Must Be Born Again." (also known as "A Ruler Once Came to Jesus by Night"). He published Walks and Talks: A Sunday School Book in 1860 and The Rejected King and Hymns of Jesus: A Devotional Book of Poems in 1888.

Sleeper died on September 24, 1904 in Auburndale, Massachusetts.
