= Congregationalism in the United States =

Protestant tradition in America

Congregationalism in the United States consists of Protestant churches in the Reformed tradition that have a congregational form of church government and trace their origins mainly to Puritan settlers of colonial New England. Congregational churches in other parts of the world are often related to these in the United States due to American missionary activities.

These principles are enshrined in the Cambridge Platform (1648) and the Savoy Declaration (1658), Congregationalist confessions of faith. (Note: "Although the Savoy Declaration's confession of faith was based largely upon that of Westminster, the section entitled 'The Institution of Churches' became an important late seventeenth-century document depicting the congregational form of church order.") (Note: "After the doctrinal exposition there follows a section titled 'The Institution of Churches, and the Order Appointed in Them by Jesus Christ,' which further specifies how their polity differs from the Presbyterian divines.") (Note: "Cambridge Platform (1648) and Savoy Declaration (1658) were the fundamental formularies of, respectively, American and English Congregationalism. In doctrine they essentially reproduced the Westminster Confession, with the changes needed to provide for a church polity of independent congregations."[Schaff; Leith; W. Walker (1893). The Creeds and Platforms of Congregationalism. New York: Charles Scribner's Sons – via Internet Archive (Princeton Theological Seminary) ]) The Congregationalist Churches are a continuity of the theological tradition upheld by the Puritans. Their genesis was through the work of Congregationalist divines Robert Browne, Henry Barrowe, and John Greenwood.

Congregational churches have had an important impact on the religious, political, and cultural history of the United States. Congregational practices concerning church governance influenced the early development of democratic institutions in New England. Many of the nation's oldest educational institutions, such as Harvard University, Bowdoin College and Yale University, were founded to train Congregational clergy. Congregational churches and ministers influenced the First and Second Great Awakenings and were early promoters of the missionary movement of the 19th century. The Congregational tradition has shaped both mainline and evangelical Protestantism in the United States.

In the 20th century, the Congregational tradition in America fragmented into three different denominations. The largest of these is the United Church of Christ, which resulted from a 1957 merger with the Evangelical and Reformed Church. Congregationalists who chose not to join the United Church of Christ founded two alternative denominations: the National Association of Congregational Christian Churches and the Conservative Congregational Christian Conference. The Evangelical Association of Reformed and Congregational Christian Churches was formed after a number of traditional congregations departed from the United Church of Christ.

== History ==
=== 17th century ===
==== Early settlement ====
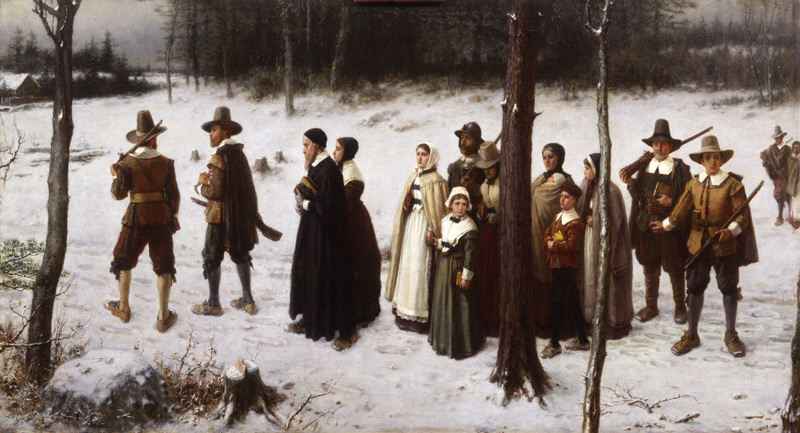
Pilgrims Going to Church, an 1867 depiction of Puritans in the New England Colonies, by George Henry Boughton

The Congregational tradition was brought to America in the 1620s and 1630s by the Puritans—a Calvinistic group within the Church of England that desired to purify it of any remaining teachings and practices of the Roman Catholic Church. As part of their reforms, Puritans desired to replace the Church of England's episcopal polity (rule by bishops) with another form of church government. Some English Puritans favored presbyterian polity (rule by assemblies of presbyters), as was utilized by the Church of Scotland, but those who founded the Massachusetts Bay Colony organized their churches according to congregational polity (rule by members of the local church).

The first Congregational church organized in America was First Parish Church in Plymouth, which was established in 1620 by Separatist Puritans known as Pilgrims. The first Congregational church organized in the Massachusetts Bay Colony was First Church in Salem, established in 1629. By 1640, 18 churches had been organized in Massachusetts. In addition, Puritans established the Connecticut Colony in 1636 and New Haven Colony in 1637. Eventually, there were 33 Congregational churches in New England.

According to historian James F. Cooper Jr., Congregationalism helped imbue the political culture of Massachusetts with several important concepts: "adherence to fundamental or 'higher' laws, strict limitations upon all human authority, free consent, local self-government, and, especially, extensive lay participation." However, congregational polity also meant the absence of any centralized church authority. The result was that at times the first generation of Congregationalists struggled to agree on common beliefs and practices.

To help achieve unity, Puritan clergy would often meet in conferences to discuss issues arising within the churches and to offer advice. Congregationalists also looked to the ministers of the First Church in Boston to set examples for other churches to follow. One of the most prominent of these ministers was John Cotton, considered by historians to be the "father of New England Congregationalism", who through his preaching, helped to standardize Congregational practices. Because of these efforts, agreement on baptism, church discipline, and the election of church officers were largely achieved by 1635.

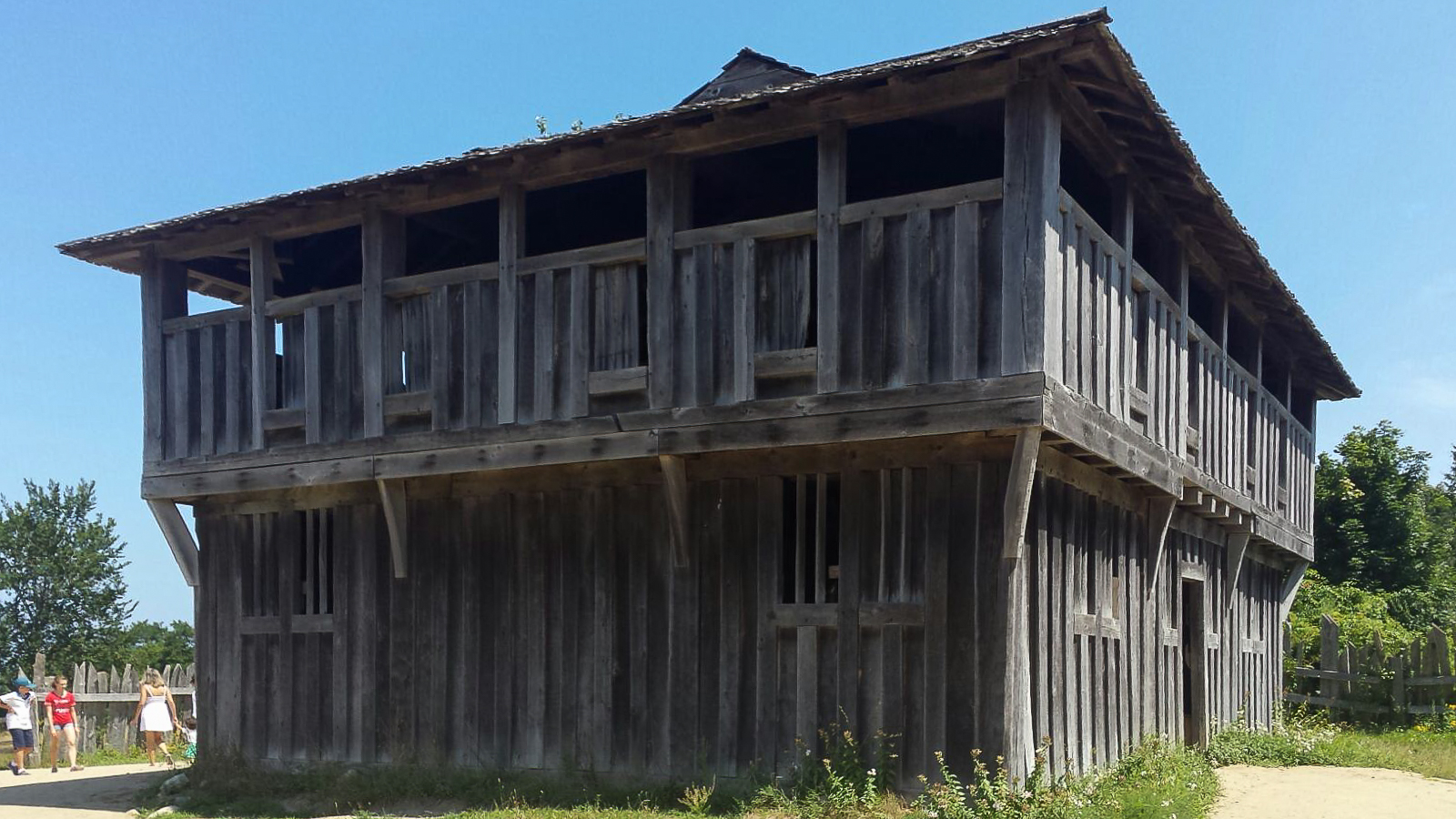
Recreation of Plymouth's fort and first church meeting house at Plimoth Patuxet

The colonists developed a system in which each community organized a gathered church of believers (i.e., only those who were thought to be among the elect and could give an account of a conversion experience were admitted as members). (Note: "Likewise, though it had been practiced in New England for several years, they reaffirmed from First Corinthians that 'churches should be churches of saints' and must therefore require of members a test of grace, or conversion.") Every congregation was founded upon a church covenant, a written agreement signed by all members in which they agreed to uphold congregational principles, to be guided by sola scriptura in their decision making, and to submit to church discipline. The right of each congregation to elect its own officers and manage its own affairs was upheld.

The major offices were elder (or presbyter) and deacon. Teaching elders or ministers were responsible for preaching and administering the sacraments. In some churches, prominent laymen would be elected for life as ruling elders to govern the church alongside teaching elders (lay elders could preach but not administer sacraments). In the beginning, deacons largely handled financial matters. By the middle of the 17th century, most churches did not have lay elders, and deacons assisted the minister in leading the church. Congregations also elected messengers to represent them in synods (church councils) for the purpose of offering non-binding advisory opinions.

The Puritans created a society in which Congregationalism was the state church, its ministers were supported by taxpayers, and only full church members could vote in elections. To ensure that Massachusetts had a supply of educated ministers, Harvard University was founded in 1636.

==== Defining Congregationalism ====
In the aftermath of the Antinomian Controversy (1636–1638), ministers realized the need for greater communication between churches and standardization of preaching. As a consequence, nonbinding ministerial conferences to discuss theological questions and address conflicts became more frequent in the following years. A more substantial innovation was the implementation of the "third way of communion", a method of isolating a dissident or heretical church from neighboring churches. Members of an offending church would be unable to worship or receive the Lord's Supper in other churches.

In the 1640s, Congregationalists were under pressure to craft a formal statement of congregational church government. This was partly motivated by the need to reassure English Puritans (who favored presbyterian polity) about congregational government. In 1645, residents of Massachusetts who resented the limitation of voting rights to full church members threatened to appeal to the English Parliament, raising fears that the English government might intervene to change the churches' restrictive membership policies. It was also thought necessary to combat the threat of Presbyterianism at home. Conflict erupted in the churches at Newbury and Hingham when their pastors began introducing presbyterian governance.

The Massachusetts General Court called for a synod of ministers and lay representatives to meet in Cambridge to craft such a statement. The Cambridge Platform was completed by the synod in 1648 and commended by the General Court as an accurate description of Congregational practice after the churches were given time to study the document, provide feedback, and finally, ratify it. While the Platform was legally nonbinding and intended only to be descriptive, it soon became regarded by ministers and laypeople alike as the religious constitution of Massachusetts, guaranteeing the rights of church officers and members.

Missionary efforts among the Native Americans began in the 1640s. John Eliot started missionary work among the natives in 1646 and later published the Eliot Indian Bible, a Massachusett language translation. The Mayhew family began their work among the natives of Martha's Vineyard around the same time as Eliot. These missionary efforts suffered serious setbacks as a result of King Philip's War. By 1696, New England had over 130 white churches and 30 Native American towns with Native American preachers.

==== Half-Way Covenant and Puritan decline ====
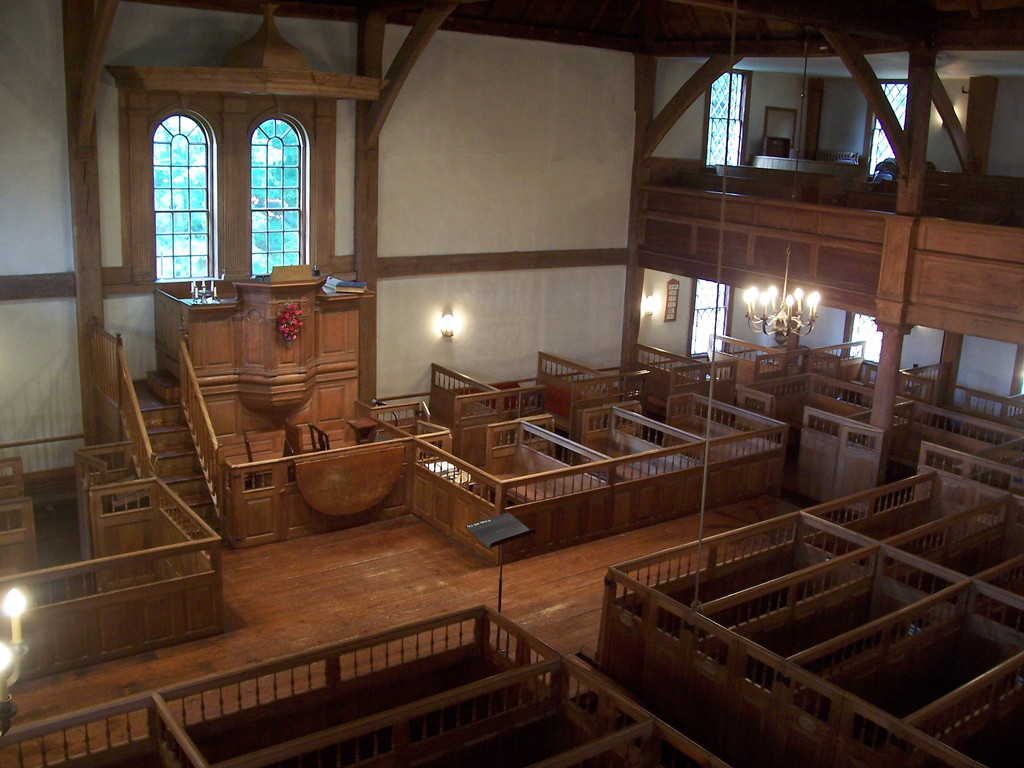
The Old Ship Church, a Puritan meetinghouse in Hingham, Massachusetts. The plain style reflects the Calvinist values of the Puritans.

In the years after the Antinomian Controversy, Congregationalists struggled with the problem of decreasing conversions among second-generation settlers. These unconverted adults had been baptized as infants, and most of them studied the Bible, attended church, and raised their children as Christians. Nevertheless, they were barred from receiving the Lord's Supper, voting, or holding office in the church. In the 1660s, the Half-Way Covenant was proposed, which would allow the grandchildren of church members to be baptized as long as their parents accepted their congregation's covenant and lived Christian lives. Some churches maintained the original standard into the 1700s. Other churches went beyond the Half-Way Covenant, opening baptism to all infants whether or not their parents or grandparents had been baptized. Other churches, citing the belief that baptism and the Lord's Supper were "converting ordinances" capable of helping the unconverted achieve salvation, allowed the unconverted to receive the Lord's Supper as well.

The decline of conversions and the division over the Half-Way Covenant was part of a larger loss of confidence experienced by Puritans in the latter half of the 17th century. In the 1660s and 1670s, Puritans began noting signs of moral decline in New England, and ministers began preaching jeremiads calling people to account for their sins. The most popular jeremiad, Michael Wigglesworth's "The Day of Doom", became the first bestseller in America.

The Savoy Declaration, a modification of the Westminster Confession of Faith, was adopted as a Congregationalist confessional statement in Massachusetts in 1680 and Connecticut in 1708.

In 1684, Massachusetts's colonial charter was revoked. It was merged with the other Bible Commonwealths along with New York and New Jersey into the Dominion of New England. Edmund Andros, an Anglican, was appointed royal governor and demanded that Anglicans be allowed to worship freely in Boston. The Dominion collapsed after the Glorious Revolution of 1688–89, and a new charter was granted in 1691. However, the power of the Congregational churches remained diminished. The governor continued to be appointed by the Crown, and voting rights were now based on wealth rather than church membership.

==== Associations develop ====
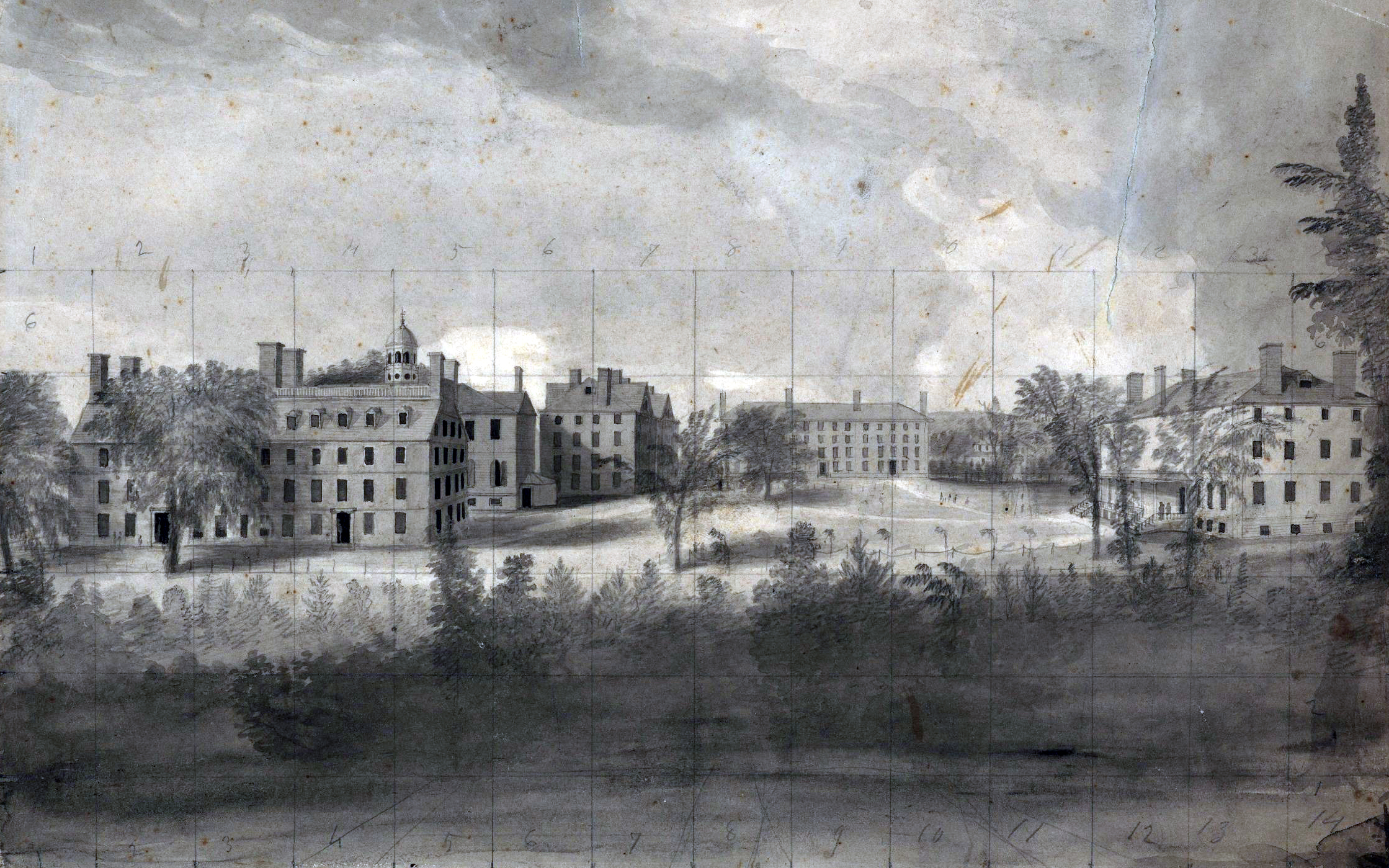
Campus of Harvard University, c. 1821–1823

In the 18th century, Congregational ministers began forming clerical associations for fellowship and consultation. The first association was the Cambridge Association, formed in 1690 for ministers in and around Boston. It met in Cambridge on the grounds of Harvard. Its purpose was to "debate any matter referring to ourselves" and "to hear and consider any cases that shall be proposed unto us, from churches or private persons". By 1692, two other associations had been formed, and the number had increased to five by 1705.

In the 1690s, John Leverett the Younger, William Brattle (pastor of First Parish in Cambridge), Thomas Brattle, and Ebenezer Pemberton (pastor of Old South Church) proposed a number of changes in Congregational practice. These changes included abandoning the consideration of conversion narratives in granting church membership and allowing all baptized members of a community (whether full members or not) to vote in elections for ministers. They also supported the baptism of all children presented by any Christian sponsor and the liturgical use of the Lord's Prayer.

These changes were strongly opposed by Increase Mather, president of Harvard. The result was that Thomas Brattle and his associates built a new church in Boston in 1698. They invited Benjamin Colman, then in England, to become the pastor. Coleman was ordained by Presbyterians in England before leaving for America because it was assumed that the conservative churches of Boston would have opposed his ordination in New England. After arriving in November 1699, his manner of ordination was controversial given that it had not been done by the congregation he was to serve, as was Congregational practice. Brattle Street Church was organized on December 12, 1699, but without the support of the other churches in the colony. Despite the opposition of Mather and other conservatives, however, the church gained recognition, and in time it became indistinguishable from other Congregational churches. By the 1730s, Colman was the leading evangelical pastor in Boston.

Ultimately, the formation of Brattle Street Church spurred Congregationalists to modify their polity and strengthen the role of associations in order to promote greater uniformity. Representatives from the Massachusetts ministerial associations met in Boston in September 1705. They proposed a plan with two major features. The first was that associations examine and license ministerial candidates, investigate charges of ministerial misconduct, and annually elect delegates to a colony-wide general association. The second feature was the creation of "standing councils" of ministers and lay representatives to supervise the churches within a geographical area and to act as counterparts to the ministerial associations. The decisions of these councils were to be "final and decisive" but could be referred to a neighboring standing council for further review. If a church refused to adhere to a council's ruling, the neighboring churches would withdraw communion from the offending church. In Massachusetts, the proposals encountered much opposition as they were viewed as being inconsistent with congregational polity. The creation of standing councils was never acted on, but Massachusetts associations did adopt a system of ministerial licensure.

While largely rejected in Massachusetts, the proposals of 1705 received a more favorable reception in Connecticut. In September 1708, a synod met at the request of the Connecticut General Assembly to write a new platform of church government. The Saybrook Platform called for the creation of standing councils called consociations in every county and tasked associations with providing ministerial consultation and licensure. The platform was approved by the General Assembly, and associations and consociations were formed in every county. The General Association of Connecticut was formed as a colony-wide organization of ministers and met for the first time in May 1709. The Saybrook Platform was legally recognized until 1784 and continued to govern the majority of Connecticut churches until the middle of the 19th century.

Yale University was established by the Congregational clergy of Connecticut in 1701.

=== 18th century ===
==== Great Awakening ====
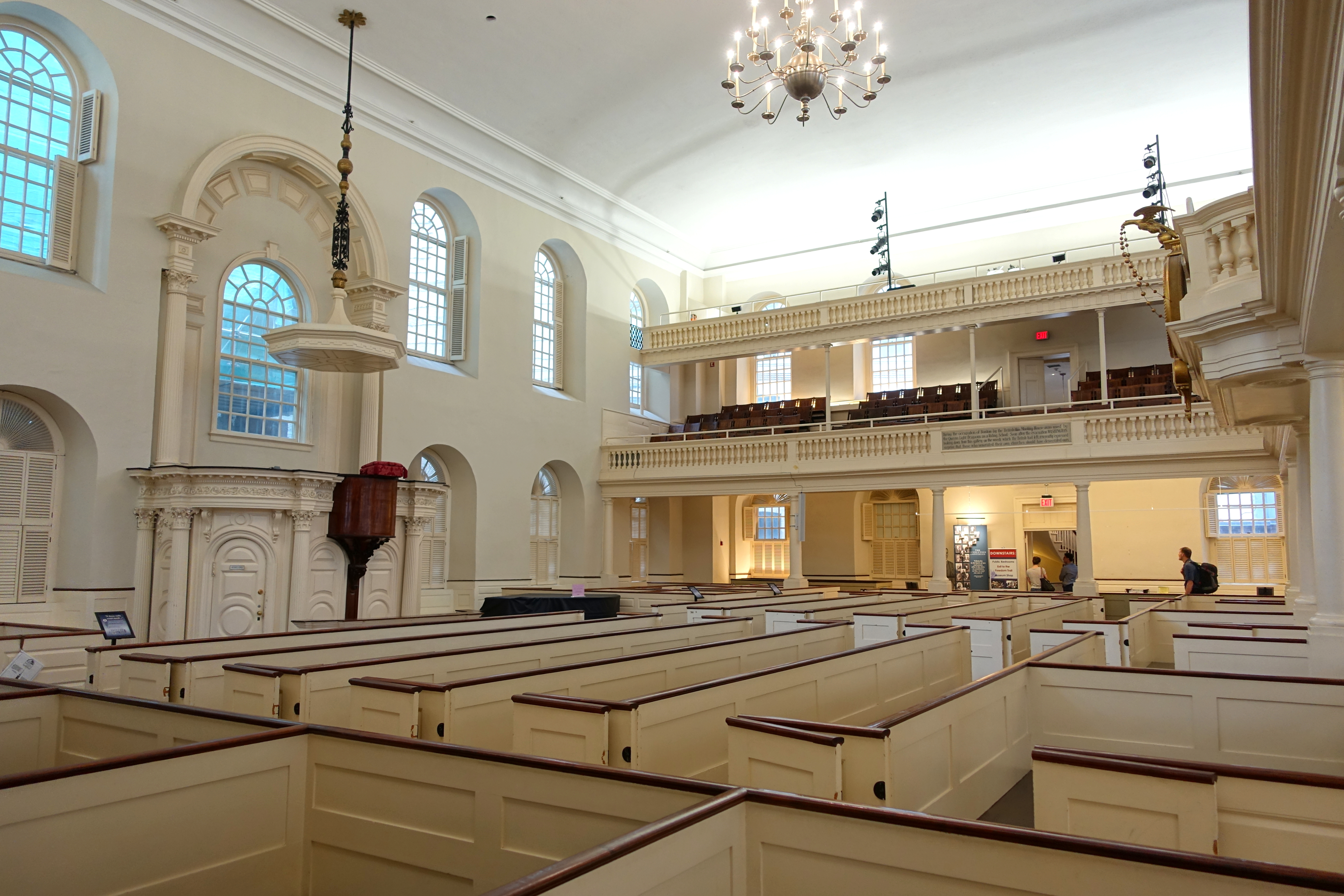
Old South Meeting House, one of the churches where George Whitefield preached while in Boston in 1740

By 1740, there were 423 Congregational churches in colonial America—33.7 percent of all churches. Nevertheless, at the start of the 18th century, many believed that New England had become a morally degenerate society more focused on worldly gain than religious piety. Church historian Williston Walker described New England piety of the time as "low and unemotional." To spiritually awaken their congregations and rescue the original Puritan mission of creating a godly society, Congregational ministers promoted revivalism, the attempt to bring spiritual renewal to an entire community. The first two decades of the 18th century saw local revivals occur that resulted in large numbers of converts. These revivals sometimes resulted from natural disasters that were interpreted as divine judgment. For example, revival followed after the earthquake of October 29, 1727.

In 1735, Jonathan Edwards led his First Church congregation of Northampton, Massachusetts, through a religious revival. His Narrative of Surprising Conversions, describing the conversion experiences that occurred in the revival, was widely read throughout New England and raised hopes among Congregationalists of a general revival of religion.

These hopes were seemingly fulfilled with the start of the Great Awakening, which was initiated by the preaching of George Whitefield, an Anglican priest who had preached revivalistic sermons to large audiences in England. He arrived in Boston in September 1740, preaching first at Brattle Street Church, and then visited other parts of New England. Though he was only in New England for a few weeks, the revival spread to every part of the region in the two years following his brief tour. Whitefield was followed by the itinerant preacher and Presbyterian minister Gilbert Tennent and dozens of other itinerants.

Initially, the Awakening's strongest supporters came from Congregational ministers, who had already been working to foster revivals in their parishes. Itinerants and local pastors worked together to produce and nourish revivals, and often local pastors would cooperate together to lead revivals in neighboring parishes. The most famous sermon preached during the Great Awakening, for example, was "Sinners in the Hands of an Angry God", delivered by Edwards at Enfield, Connecticut, in July 1741. Many in the congregation were affected by Edwards's sermon, with minister Stephen Williams reporting "amazing shrieks and cries" caused by the heightened religious excitement.

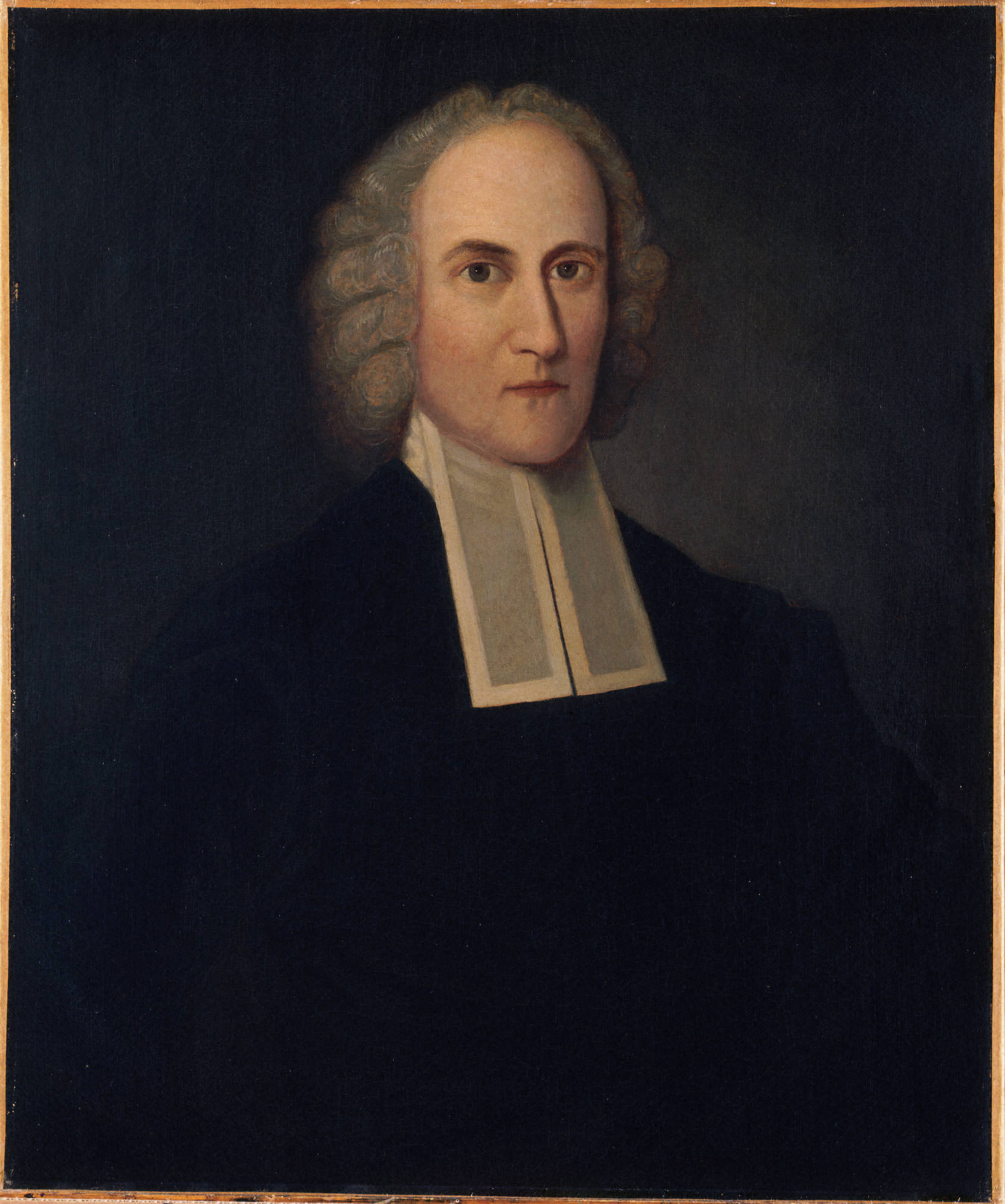
Portrait of Jonathan Edwards, revivalist and theologian

By 1742, the revival had entered a more radical and disruptive phase. Lay people became more active participants in the services by crying out, exhorting, or having visions. Uneducated men and women began to preach without formal training, and some itinerant preachers were active in parishes without the approval of the local pastor. Enthusiasts even claimed that many of the clergies were unconverted themselves and thus unqualified to be ministers. Congregationalists split into Old Lights and New Lights over the Awakening, with Old Lights opposing it and New Lights supporting it.

A notable example of revival radicalism was James Davenport, a Congregational minister who preached to large crowds throughout Massachusetts and Connecticut. Davenport denounced ministers who opposed him as being "unconverted" and "leading their people blindfold to hell." In March 1743, he held a book burning of the works of Increase Mather, William Beveridge, John Flavel, and others.

Concerns over the revival led the Connecticut General Assembly to call a synod in 1741, which was the last Congregational synod convened under state authority. This "General Consociation" consisted of both lay and clerical representatives from all of the consociations in the colony. It ruled that itinerant ministers should preach in no parish except with the permission of the local pastor. In May 1742, the General Assembly passed legislation requiring ministers to receive permission to preach from the local pastor; violation of the law would result in the loss of a minister's state-provided salary.

In 1743, the annual Massachusetts Ministerial Convention condemned "the disorderly tumults and indecent behaviors" that occurred in many revival meetings. Charles Chauncy of Boston's First Church became the leader of the revival's opponents with the publication of his Seasonable Thoughts on the State of Religion in New England, which attacked the enthusiasm and extravagant behaviors of revival meetings.

Other Congregationalists met at Boston in 1743 under the leadership of Benjamin Colman of Brattle Street Church and Thomas Prince of Old South Church. They issued a resolution supporting the revival as the work of God and downplaying the impact of "irregularities" that had occurred. Nevertheless, the atmosphere toward revival had changed by 1744 when Whitefield returned to New England. The faculties of Harvard and Yale issued statements critical of his methods, and ministerial associations throughout the region spoke against allowing him to preach in their churches.

While most New Lights stayed within the established Congregational churches, there were still those in New England who embraced the radical wing of the Awakening–with its trances, visions and shouting. When radical revivalists could not control their local churches, they separated from the state churches and formed new congregations. These Separate or Strict Congregationalists were often poor. They rejected the necessity of an educated ministry, ministerial associations (which had tried to control the revival), and the Half-Way Covenant. Prone to schisms and forced to pay taxes for the state churches, Separate Congregationalists did not survive long. The more traditional ones returned to the established Congregational churches, while the most radical embraced adult baptism and became Baptists. Shubal Stearns, a Separate Congregationalist missionary to the South, became the founding father of the Separate Baptists.

==== Liberals, Old Calvinists, and the New Divinity ====
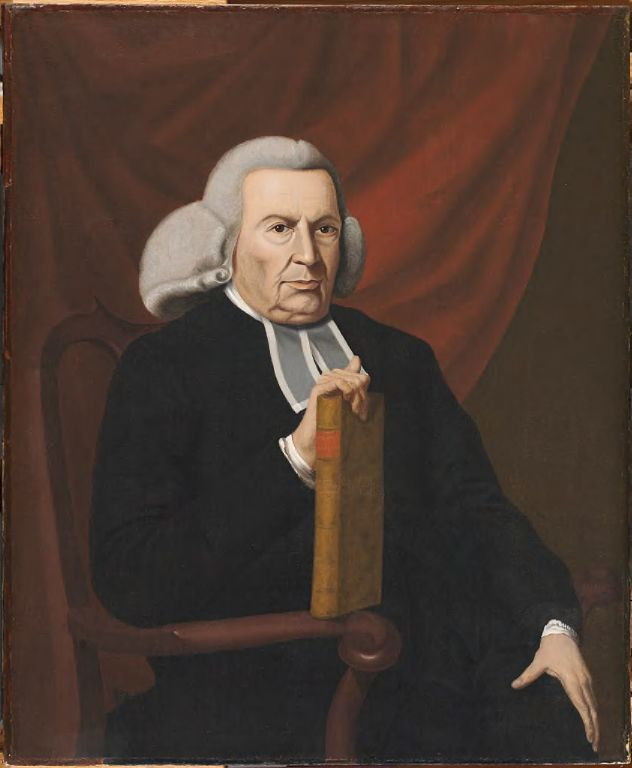
Charles Chauncy was an influential liberal theologian and opponent of New Light revivalism.

The Great Awakening further aggravated theological divisions that had already existed. By the end of the 18th century, Congregationalists were divided between liberal, Old Calvinist, and New Divinity factions.

Under the influence of Enlightenment thought, liberals rejected the Calvinism of their Puritan heritage, particularly the doctrines of total depravity, unconditional election, and double predestination. These taught that sinners were deserving of damnation while helpless to achieve salvation. Liberals believed this was unfair and adopted an Arminian theology that gave individuals a role in their own salvation. Liberal Arminians did not teach that good works could earn salvation, but they did teach that a person who strove for regeneration by virtuous living and the performance of good works could expect to receive eternal life. Liberals such as Charles Chauncy embraced universal salvation and believed that hell was a cleansing purgatory, not an eternal punishment. Many liberals rejected the doctrine of the Trinity in favor of an Arian Christology that preserved the unity of God. For this reason, their opponents disparagingly called them Unitarians, even though they called themselves liberal Christians or Arminians. Alongside Chauncy, Jonathan Mayhew of Boston's West Church was another prominent liberal minister.

At the opposite end of the theological spectrum were the Old Calvinists, who continued to adhere to Reformed covenant theology and the doctrines contained in the Westminster Standards. The Old Calvinists included both Old Lights, New Lights, and Moderate Calvinists within their ranks. Moderate Calvinists avoided preaching on the doctrines of election and reprobation in response to attacks on Calvinism from Enlightenment philosophers. To make Calvinism less offensive, the Moderates preached on practical topics and emphasized preparing for conversion through the use of the means of grace (preaching, catechizing, prayer) and pastoral care. Ezra Stiles was a notable Old Calvinist.

In the two decades after the First Great Awakening, the tone of Congregational thought was set by New Light theologian Jonathan Edwards and his followers, the most notable being Joseph Bellamy and Samuel Hopkins. The New Divinity, as the Edwardsean school of thought, became known, sought to answer Arminian objections to Calvinism and to provide a theological basis for the revivalism that had been unleashed by the Great Awakening. The New Divinity would remain the dominant theological orientation within the Congregational churches into the 19th century.

==== Revolutionary-era ====
During the American Revolution, most Congregational ministers sided with the Patriots and American independence. This was largely because ministers chose to stand with their congregations who felt the British government was becoming tyrannical. Ministers were also motivated by fear that the British would appoint Anglican bishops for the American colonies. This had been proposed as a practical measure; American bishops could ordain Anglican priests in the colonies without requiring candidates for ordination to travel to England. Congregationalists, however, remembered how their Puritan ancestors were oppressed by bishops in England and had no desire to see the same system in America.

Ministers preached patriotic sermons on Sundays and during militia musters. Jonathan Mayhew, for example, preached an early revolutionary sermon on The Danger of Unlimited Submission. Many went to war as chaplains, and some actually bore arms in times of extreme danger. Because of their overwhelming support for independence, Congregational ministers were called the "Black Regiment" or "Black-Robed Regiment" by the British.

==== Domestic expansion ====
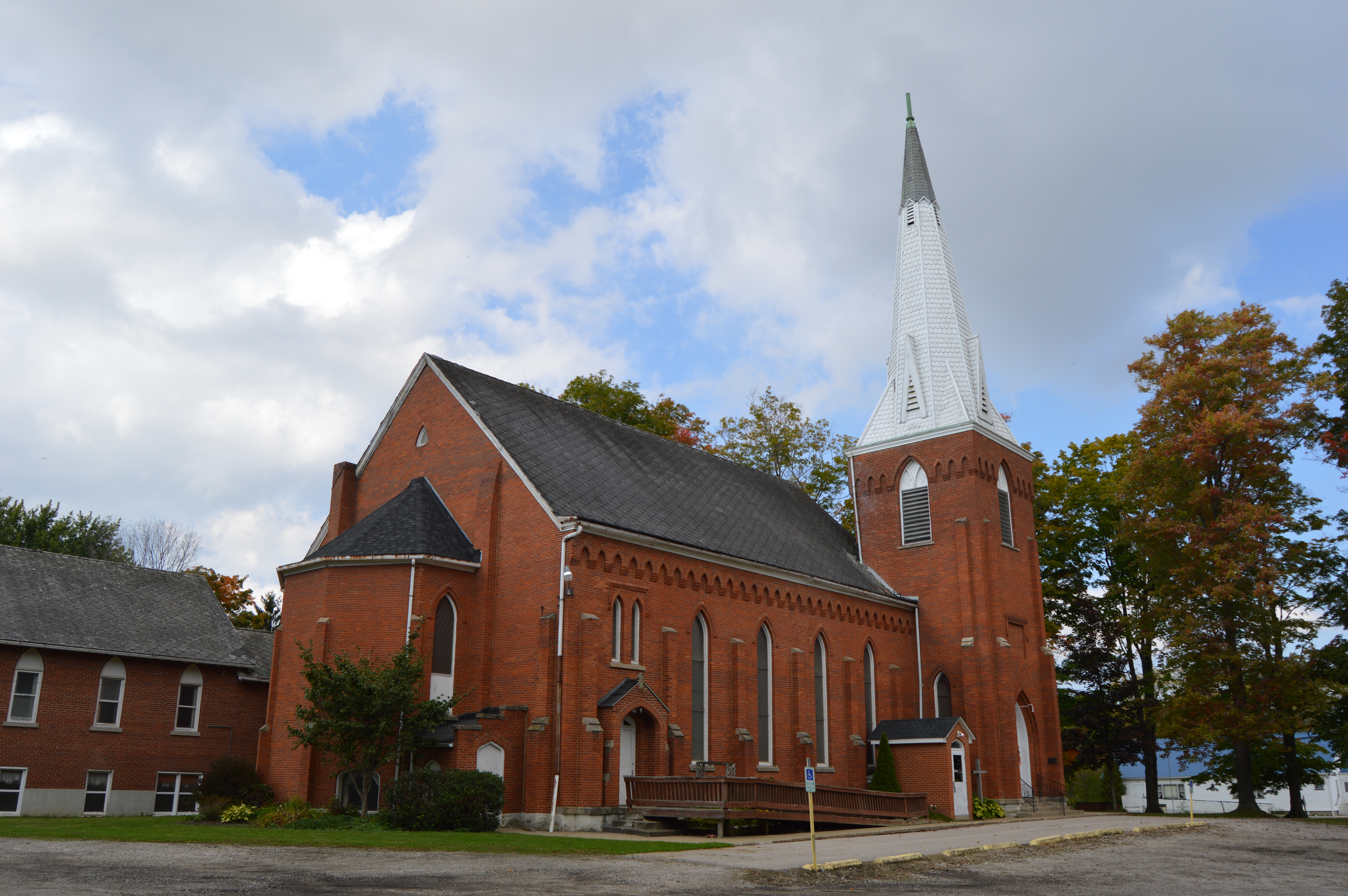
The Congregational Church of Austinburg, organized in 1801, is the second oldest Congregational church in Ohio and the oldest in the Western Reserve. The current building dates to 1877.

By 1776, there were 668 Congregational churches—21 percent of all churches in America. Congregationalism had been a tradition largely confined to New England, but Congregationalists would migrate westward as the new United States expanded. Vermont was the first of these new territories to be opened up. The first church was established in 1762, but there were 74 Congregational churches in Vermont by 1800. Those churches organized a General Convention for that state in 1796. The University of Vermont and Middlebury College were founded by Congregationalists.

Congregational churches had been present in eastern New York prior to the Revolution, but expansion into the central and western parts of that state took place in the 1790s as emigration increased from Massachusetts and Connecticut. As New Englanders settled in the Old Northwest, they brought Congregationalism with them. The First Congregational Church of Marietta, Ohio, gathered in 1796, is the oldest Congregational church in the region.

In 1798, the Connecticut General Association created the Connecticut Missionary Society to provide for the religious needs of the new settlements. Between 1798 and 1818, the society sent 148 ministers to the frontier settlements of northern New England, Pennsylvania, and the Old Northwest. Initially, the society recruited settled pastors to undertake four-month tours in the new settlements. When this approach proved unworkable, the society shed its opposition to itinerant ministry and began ordaining young men to serve as full-time evangelists. These operated similarly to the Methodist circuit riders, "moving from town to town, preaching revival sermons, catechizing youth, administering the sacraments, and distributing religious literature." The society distributed tracts, hymnals, sermon collections, and theological treatises for use in religious worship and education. Reflecting the ideology of its leaders, the society's literature heavily favored the writings of Jonathan Edwards and the New Divinity. Its most widely circulated publication was the Connecticut Evangelical Magazine, which provided coverage of revivals and missions around the world and which was read as far south as Georgia.

In 1799, the Massachusetts Missionary Society was established under the leadership of Nathanael Emmons. Like its Connecticut counterpart, it was dominated by Edwardseans and published its own periodical, the Massachusetts Missionary Magazine. The New Hampshire Missionary Society was organized in 1801, and the Vermont General Convention organized its own missionary society in 1807.

Besides those dedicated to missions, Congregationalists created voluntary societies for encouraging education, Bible reading, and moral reform. Some of these became national organizations, such as the American Education Society in 1815 (which provided financial aid for seminary students), the American Bible Society in 1816, the American Colonization Society in 1817, and the American Temperance Society in 1826. Some of these were joint projects with Presbyterians.

=== 19th century ===
==== Foreign missions ====
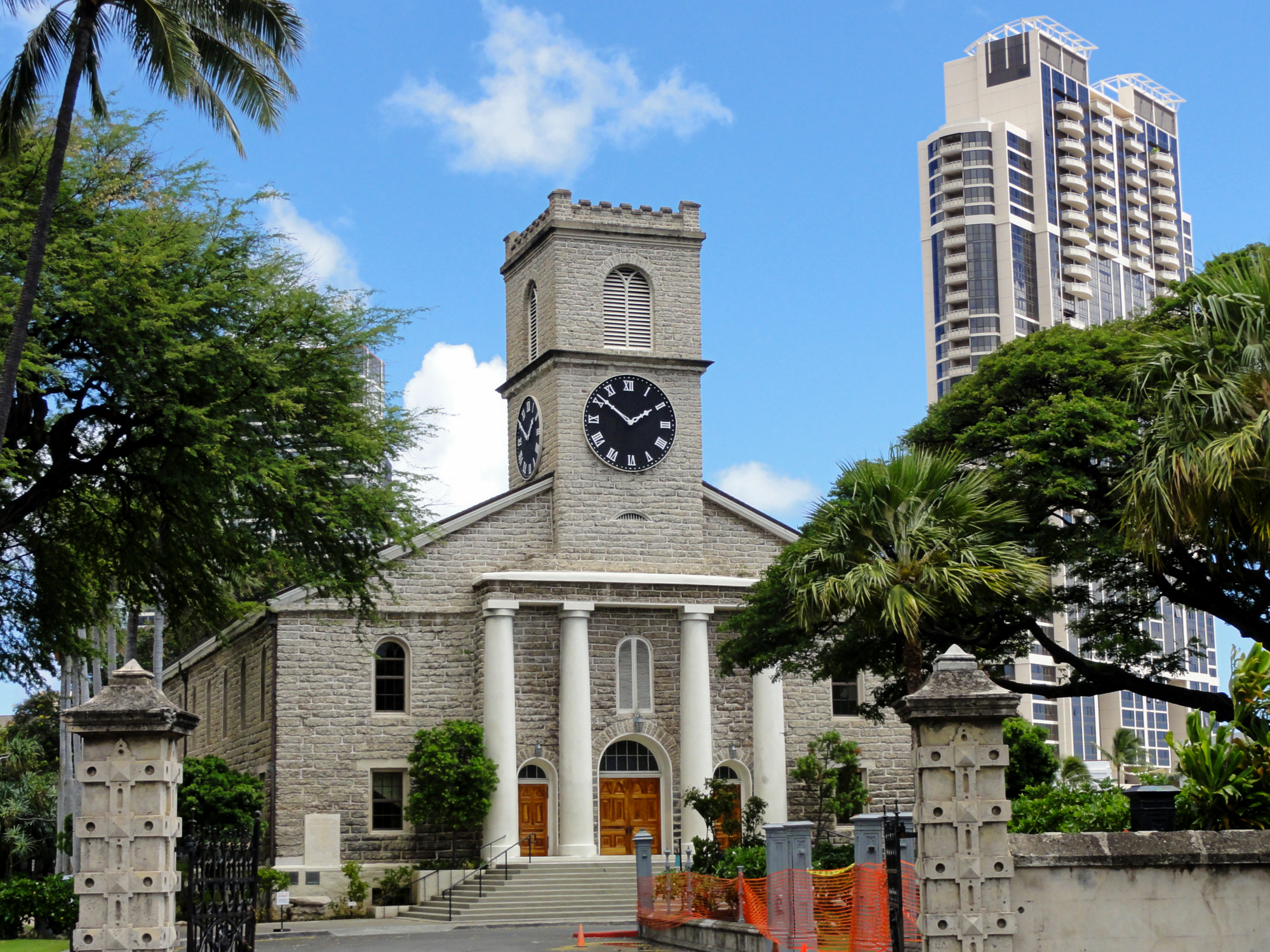
Kawaiahaʻo Church, known as the "Westminster Abbey of Hawaii"

Following the example of the churches in Connecticut and Vermont, Congregationalists in other parts of the Northeast formed statewide associations. The Massachusetts General Association was founded in 1803 by the Old Calvinists and Edwardseans of that state. In 1808, the churches in Rhode Island organized the Evangelical Consociation of Rhode Island. The New Hampshire General Association was established in 1809. The General Conference of Maine was founded sometime in the 1820s, and the New York General Association was formed in 1834.

In 1810, a group of students at Andover Theological Seminary, led by Samuel John Mills and Adoniram Judson, convinced the Massachusetts General Association to support the creation of a foreign missionary society. The Connecticut General Association was invited to participate as well and hosted the first meeting of the American Board of Commissioners for Foreign Missions. Through the American Board, Congregational churches supported missionaries in India, China, Ceylon, South Africa, Turkey, and the Hawaiian Islands.

The American Board also established missions among Native American tribes, including the Cherokee, Creek, Choctaw, Chickasaw, Tetons, Blackfeet, and Winnebagos. As a plaintiff in Worcester v. Georgia, American Board missionary Samuel Worcester fought to prevent the forced relocation of the Cherokees, and the United States Supreme Court ruled in his favor. When President Andrew Jackson refused to enforce the decision, the Cherokee were sent to Oklahoma, and American Board missionaries followed them there.

==== Union with Presbyterians ====
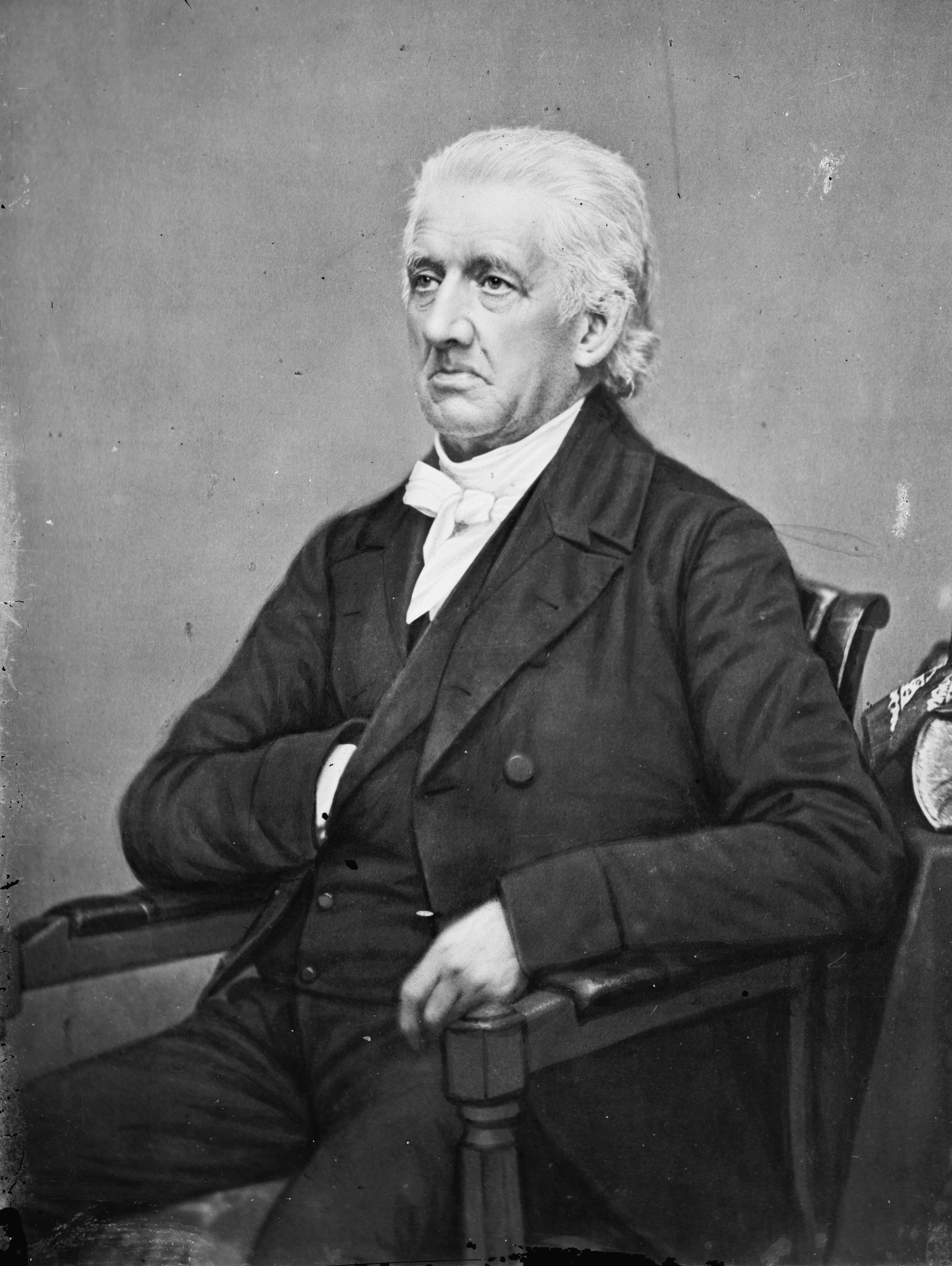
Revivalist and social reformer Lyman Beecher served both Congregational and Presbyterian churches during his ministry.

The challenge of building churches and providing ministers for western settlements motivated many Congregationalists to engage in closer cooperation with the Presbyterians. While the two denominations had different systems of church government, they were both parts of the Calvinist tradition. This shared heritage and the necessity of evangelizing the west led them to form united Presbyterian-Congregational institutions and churches in areas where ministers and resources were in short supply. This cooperation was formalized in the Plan of Union, first adopted in 1801 between the Presbyterian Church in the United States of America and the General Association of Connecticut. The plan was later adopted by the Vermont General Convention, the New Hampshire General Association, and the Massachusetts General Association.

The plan allowed for churches to hire pastors from either denomination and the creation of mixed churches that could belong to either a Congregational association or a local presbytery of the Presbyterian Church. Church discipline, however, was to be administered by a committee with members from both denominations. When disputes arose, churches could appeal to councils representing both Congregationalists and Presbyterians. Union colleges were also created, such as Knox College in Illinois, which continues its dual affiliation with the United Church of Christ and the Presbyterian Church (USA).

The Presbyterians gained more from the union than the Congregationalists. Around 2000 churches founded as Congregationalists in the states of New York, Ohio, Illinois and Michigan switched allegiance to the Presbyterian Church. The union was also damaged by a conflict between conservatives and liberals in both denominations. A major blow to the plan occurred in 1837 when the Presbyterian Church split as a result of the Old School–New School Controversy. The Old School Presbyterians withdrew from the union, but the New School Presbyterians remained. The union was further damaged by tensions over slavery. In 1852, a national convention of Congregational churches met in Albany, New York, and ended the Plan of Union.

==== Unitarian controversy ====
Since the 17th century, Congregationalists had managed to maintain unity despite disagreements over the role of man and God in salvation and the adoption by liberals of nontrinitarian theological ideas. By the start of the 19th century, however, there was less willingness to tolerate theological liberalism. The Second Great Awakening had initiated a new wave of revivalism and a more aggressive stance from conservatives. Old Calvinists and Edwardseans, while not ignoring their own differences, agreed that they needed to work together to defend the "evangelical truth" from liberalism. The "orthodox" or evangelicals, as they came to be known, were united around the omnipotence of God, the necessity of conversion, a converted church membership, and the literal truth of the Bible. They were actively involved in evangelism and expansion through voluntary societies.

By the 19th century, the liberals had evolved into Unitarians. Not only did they deny the doctrine of the Trinity as unscriptural, they believed the Bible should be interpreted rationally, not in a literal manner. Their preaching focused on ethics rather than on doctrine and did not limit church membership to the converted. Unitarians did not participate in evangelistic societies due to their conviction that people informed by reason and scripture should be free to believe what they wanted. When they did organize, they tended to focus on education and philanthropic causes.

The Unitarian controversy was initiated when conservatives, led by Yale-educated geographer and Boston-area minister Jedidiah Morse, opposed the appointment of liberal Henry Ware to the Hollis Chair of Divinity at Harvard University in 1805. While unsuccessful, Morse was able to form a network of conservative ministers from the Boston area, mainly outside the city itself, as Boston's churches were overwhelmingly liberal. Conservatives began closing their pulpits to liberal ministers, and Park Street Church was established in 1809 to provide Boston with an evangelical church. In the years after the Ware controversy, Harvard became increasingly partisan, supporting only the liberal party. In 1808, Edwardseans and Old Calvinists joined forces and established Andover Theological Seminary as an alternative to liberal Harvard. Andover was the first Protestant seminary in North America.

In 1815, Morse published Review of American Unitarianism, which accused Unitarians of infidelity and heresy. William Ellery Channing, pastor of the Boston's Federal Street Church, responded by accusing conservatives of instigating theological controversy. In 1819, Channing went on to deliver an important sermon in defense of liberal religion titled "Unitarian Christianity". The split was complete by 1825 when the liberals established the American Unitarian Association, thereby acknowledging a separate denominational identity.

==== Disestablishment ====
At the start of the 19th century, Congregationalism remained the established church of Connecticut, Massachusetts, and New Hampshire. This meant that Congregational churches were financially supported through taxation. In 1818, however, Connecticut's new state constitution required disestablishment. New Hampshire followed a year later with the passage of the Toleration Act, which stripped Congregational churches of their special status.

Massachusetts was slower to end state support of Congregationalism, but disestablishment was made more likely after the Unitarian schism. Congregational parishes were divided into two groups: parishioners who lived within the parish's geographical boundaries and full church members, who tended to be a numerical minority. In many parishes, the majority of parishioners supported the more liberal Unitarians, but the church members remained Trinitarian. In 1820, the Massachusetts Supreme Court ruled in the Dedham case that the majority of the parish (not just the church members) could hire ministers and manage church business. This effectively disenfranchised conservatives in the Boston area, who were usually the minority. Between 1821 and 1833, Trinitarians lost control of over a hundred churches to the Unitarians.

The Dedham case ruling by Justice Isaac Parker, who happened to be a Unitarian, determined that the minority in a church split not only lost its claim on the church property but also lost its status as an established church. As tax-supported congregations continued to defect to Unitarianism, the Dedham case increased conservative support for disestablishment. In 1833, the state constitution was amended to eliminate church taxes.

==== Other theological disputes ====
As the Unitarian division was solidifying, the New Divinity was itself fracturing into different branches. Timothy Dwight, who became president of Yale University in 1795, ensured that Edwardsean theology dominated at that institution. He was also responsible for creating a theologically moderate party among Edwardseans that placed more emphasis on human action through means of grace. Yale professor Nathaniel William Taylor carried this further in what became known as the New Haven theology, which essentially claimed that humans could reject sin and choose God.

Critics found in the New Haven theology echoes of Unitarianism and Pelagianism, and the Edwardseans were enmeshed in the Taylorite Controversy through the 1830s. Traditional Edwardseans such as Asahel Nettleton, Bennet Tyler, and Edward Dorr Griffin opposed it. Tyler founded Hartford Seminary in 1833 to counteract New Haven theology.

=== 20th century ===
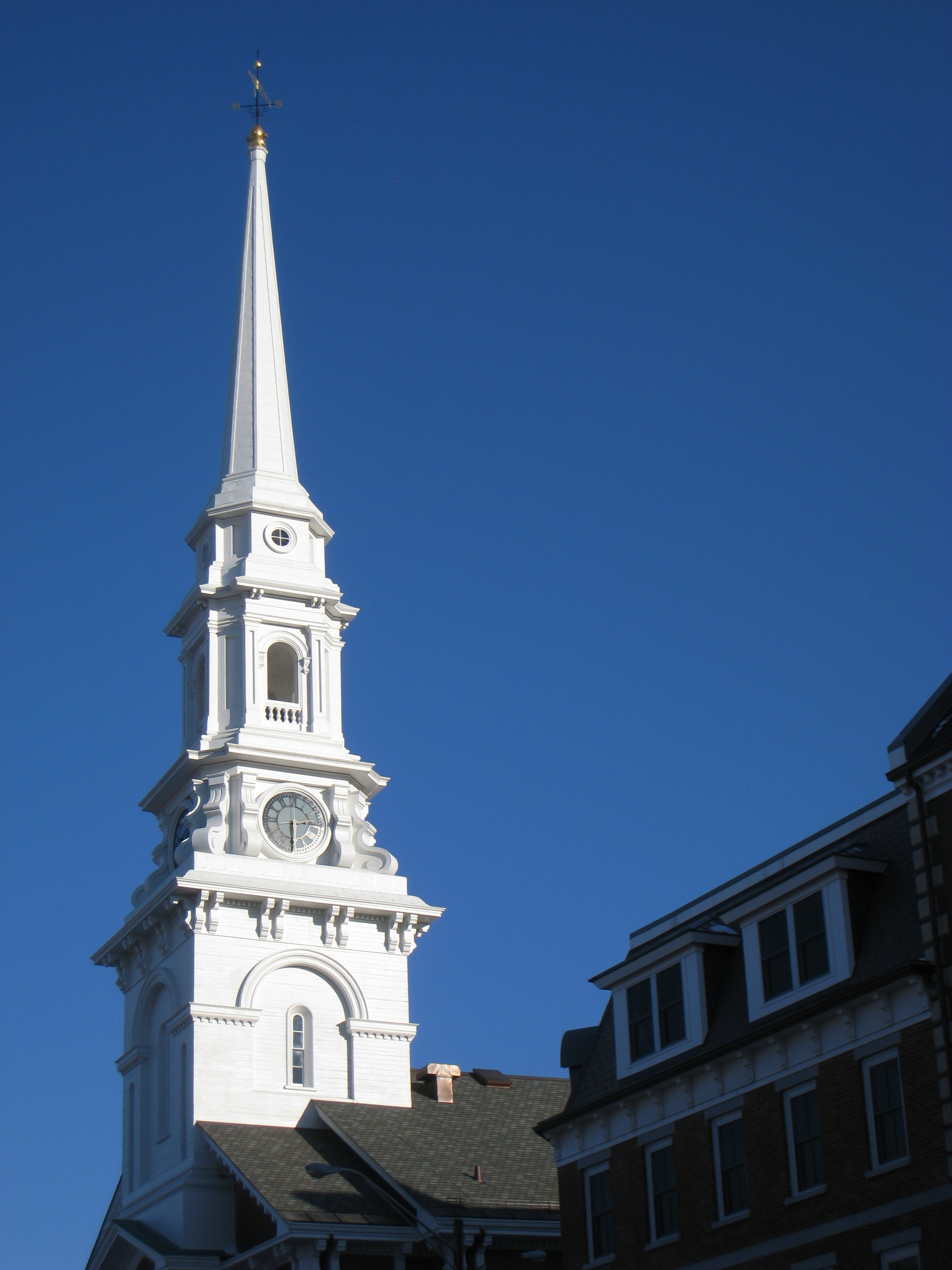
The steeple of North Church, a historic Congregational church in Portsmouth, New Hampshire

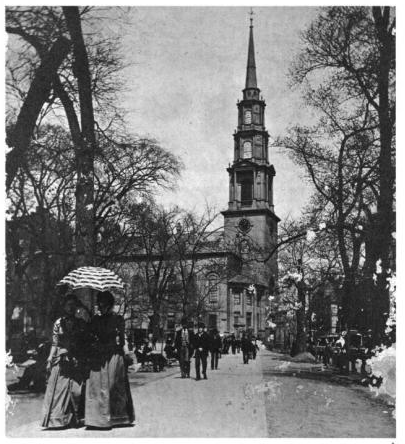
Park Street Church in Boston, c. 1890

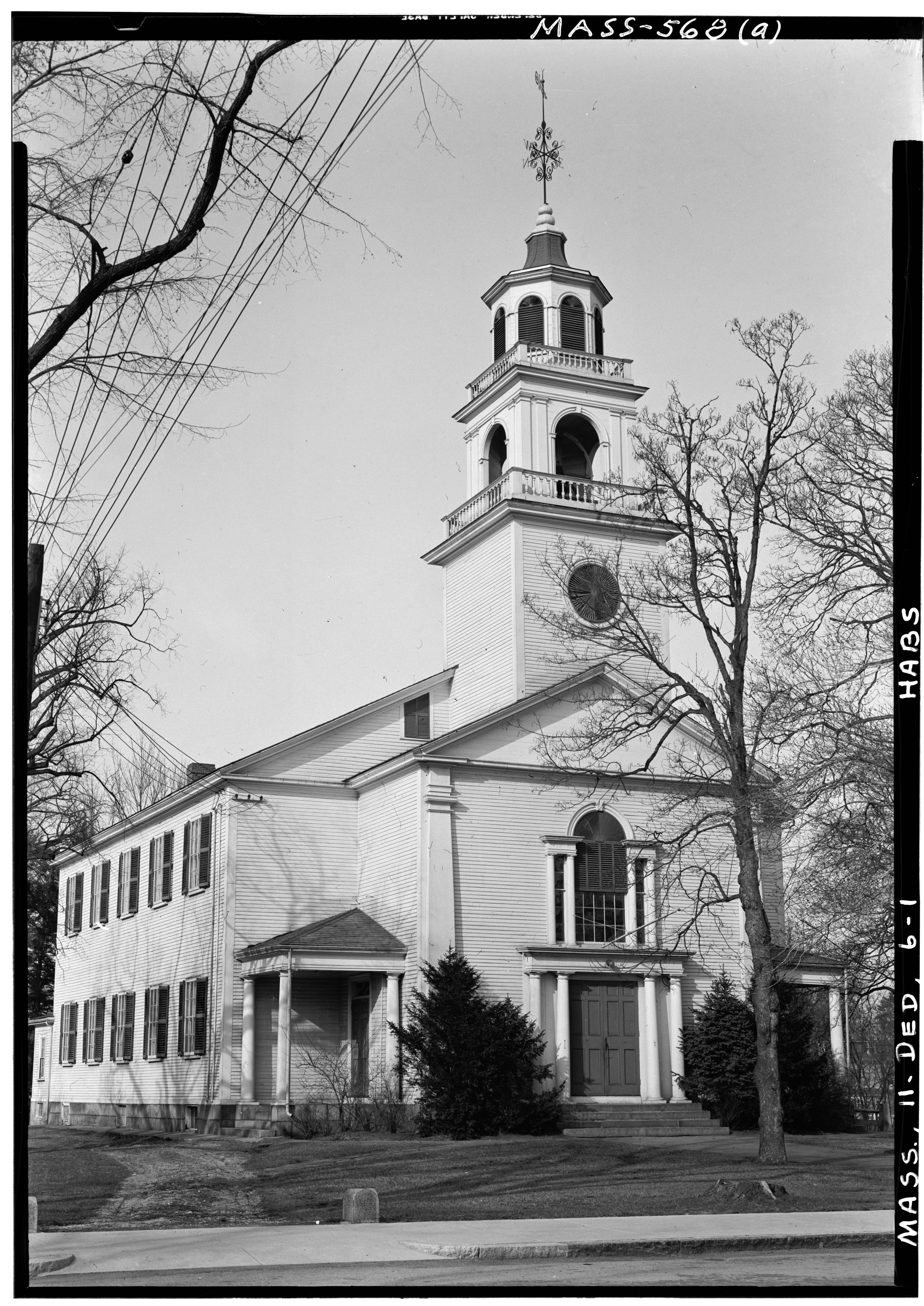
Allin Congregational Church, built in 1819, lost the Dedham case.

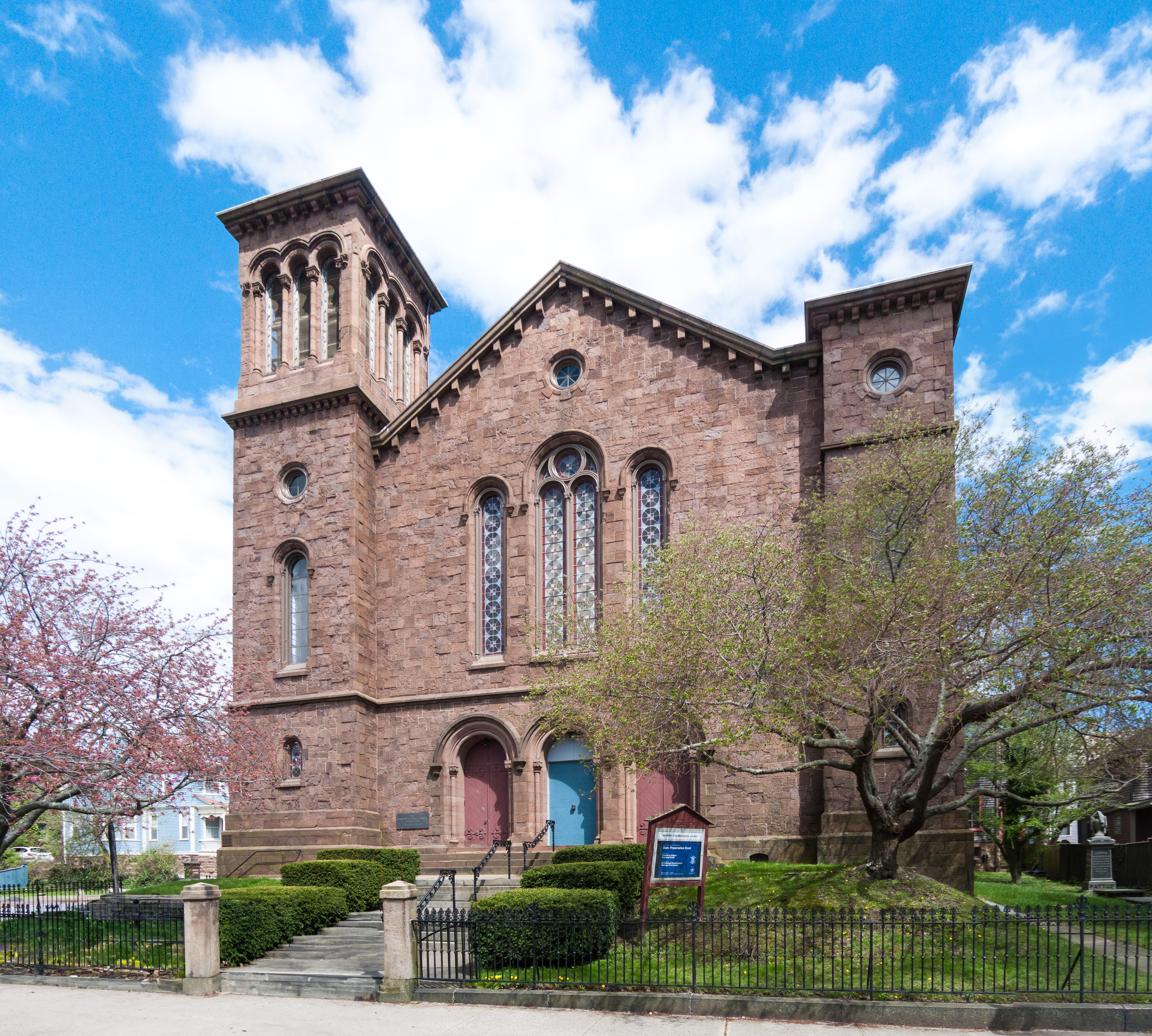
United Congregational Church in Newport, Rhode Island

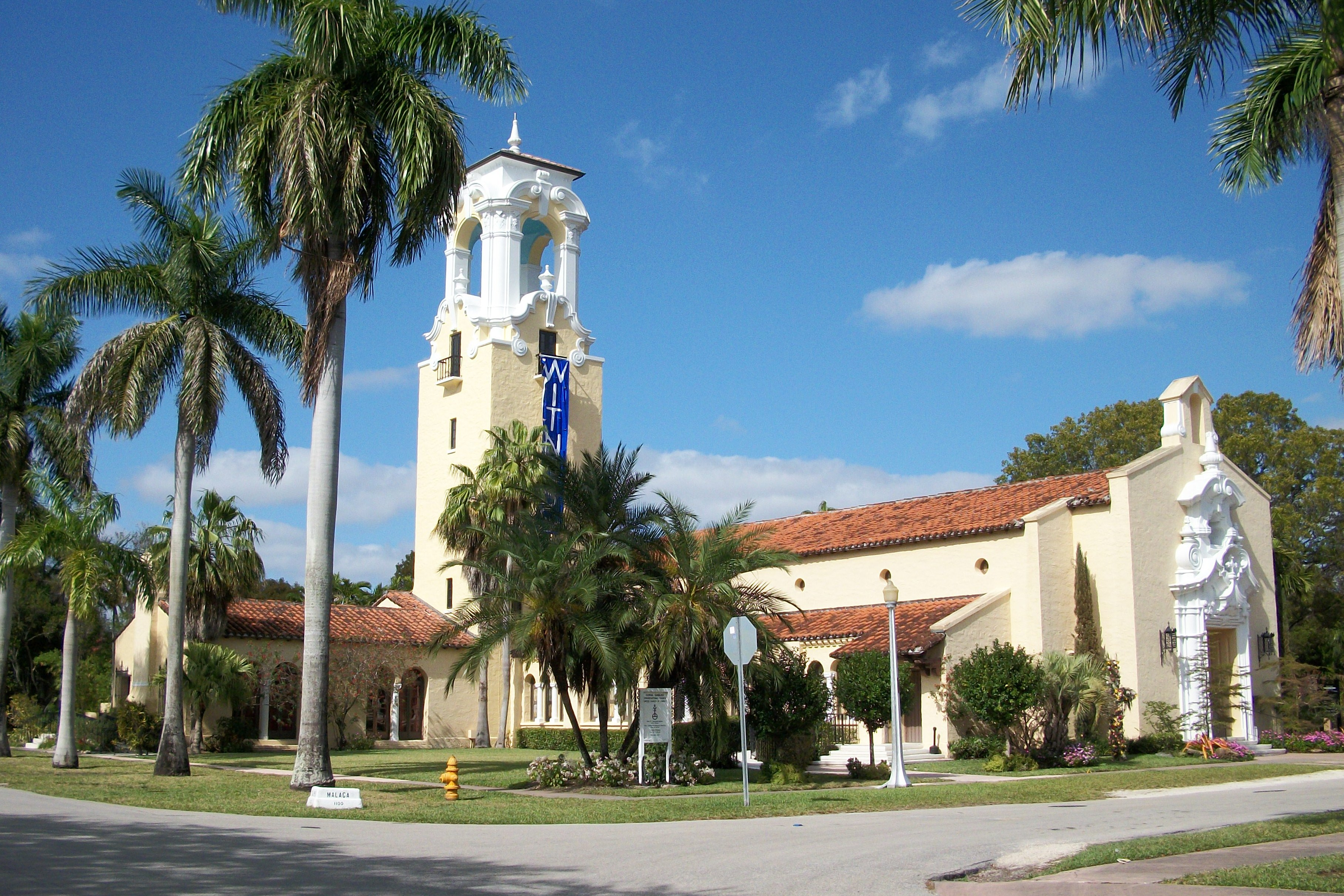
Coral Gables Congregational Church in Florida

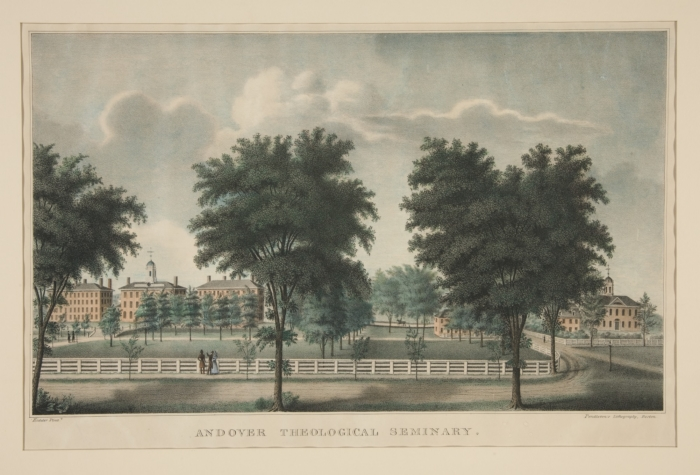
Andover Theological Seminary, established in 1807

In 1931 the National Council of the Congregational Churches of the United States and the General Convention of the Christian Church, a body from the Restoration Movement tradition of the early 19th century, merged to form the Congregational Christian Churches. The Congregationalists were used to a more formal, less evangelistic form of worship than Christian Church members, who mostly came from rural areas of the South and the Midwest. Both groups, however, held to local autonomy and eschewed binding creedal authority.

In the early 20th century, some Congregational (later Congregational Christian) churches took exception to the beginnings of growth of regional or national authority in bodies outside the local church, such as mission societies, national committees, and state conferences. Some congregations opposed liberalizing influences that appeared to mitigate traditional views of sin and corollary doctrines such as the substitutionary atonement of Jesus. In 1948, some adherents of these two streams of thought (mainly the latter one) started a new fellowship, the Conservative Congregational Christian Conference (CCCC). It was the first major fellowship to organize outside of the mainstream Congregational body since 1825, when the Unitarians formally founded their own body.

In 1957, the General Council of Congregational Christian Churches in the U.S. merged with the Evangelical and Reformed Church to form the United Church of Christ. About 90% of the CC congregations affiliated with the General Council joined the United Church of Christ. Some churches abstained from the merger, while others voted it down. Most of the latter congregations became members of either the CCCC (mentioned above) or the National Association of Congregational Christian Churches. The latter was formed by churches and people who objected to the UCC merger because of concerns that the new national church and its regional bodies represented extra-congregational authorities that would interfere with a congregation's right to govern itself. Thus, the NACCC includes congregations of a variety of theological positions. Still, other congregations chose not to affiliate with any particular association of churches or only with regional or local ones.

==== Genealogy ====
Chart of splits and mergers of Congregationalist churches in US

Splits and mergers of Congregationalist churches in US

English Independent Puritans
Pilgrims (1610s)
Dutch Reformed; Church in America (1628)
Congregationalist churches (1620s)
UCA (1778)
CC (1792) | RCUS (1793)
Prussian Union Church (1817)
AUA (1825)
German pietist protestants (1830s)
NCCCUS (1865)
ESNA (1872)
CCC (1931)
E&R (1934) | Eureka Classis (1934)
CCCC (1948)
NACCC (1955)
UCC (1957)
UUA (1961)
RCUS (1985)
EARCCC (2005)

== Notable people ==
- Reuben Gaylord (1812–1880), Congregational minister and one of the early missionary pioneers in the Nebraska Territory. After pastorates in Iowa and Omaha, he served from 1876 to 1880 as minister of the Congregational churches in Fontanelle and Jalapa, Nebraska. Gaylord has been described as a "father of Congregationalism in Nebraska."

== See also ==
- Evangelical and Reformed Church, German Reformed
- Presbyterianism in the United States
- Reformed Church in America, Dutch Reformed
