= Eddie Lawrence (footballer) =

Welsh footballer

Personal information
- Date of birth: 24 August 1907
- Place of birth: Wales

Senior career*
Years	Team	Apps	(Gls)
- Druids United
- Wrexham
- Clapton Orient
- Notts County
- Bournemouth & Boscombe Athletic
- Players Athletic
- Grantham Town

International career
1930–1931	Wales	2	(0)
- * Club domestic league appearances and goals

Eddie Lawrence (24 August 1907 – ) was a Welsh international footballer. He was part of the Wales national football team between 1930 and 1931, playing 2 matches. He played his first match on 1 February 1930 against Ireland and his last match on 31 October 1931 against Scotland.

At club level, Lawrence played in the English Football League for Wrexham, Clapton Orient, Notts County and Bournemouth & Boscombe.

== See also ==
- List of Wales international footballers (alphabetical)
