= Edward St. Lawrence =

Edward St. Lawrence was an Anglican priest in Ireland in the 19th century.

St. Lawrence educated at Trinity College, Dublin. He was Prebendary of Killaspugmullane in Cork Cathedral from 1823 Cork; and Archdeacon of Ross from 1825, holding both posts until his death on 23 May 1842.
