= Congregational Church Of Austinburg =

Historic church in Ohio, United States

- U.S. National Register of Historic Places
- Location within Ohio Location within the United States
- Location: OH 307, Austinburg, Ohio
- Coordinates: 41°46′17″N 80°51′23″W
- Area: 1.4 acres (0.57 ha)
- Built: 1877
- Architect: John K. Nutting; Betsy Cowles
- Architectural style: Gothic Revival
- NRHP reference No.: 78002001
- Added to NRHP: December 22, 1978

Congregational Church Of Austinburg (also known as The First United Church of Christ, Austinburg) is a historic congregational church on OH 307 in Austinburg, Ohio.

It was built in 1877 and added to the National Register of Historic Places in 1978. The congregation is currently affiliated with the United Church of Christ.
