= Williston Walker =

American historian (1860–1922)

Williston Walker, D.D., L.H.D., Ph.D. (1860–1922) was an American Church historian, born at Portland, Me. He graduated at Amherst in 1883, and at the Hartford Theological Seminary in 1886, then studied at Leipzig (Ph.D., 1888).

Walker was employed at Hartford Seminary from 1889 to 1901, when he accepted a position at Yale University. Walker was elected a member of the American Antiquarian Society in 1901.

== Publications ==
- On the Increase of Royal Power Under Philip Augustus (1888)
- The Creeds and Platforms of Congregationism (1893)
- A History of the Congregational Churches in the United States (1894)
- The Reformation (1900)
- Ten New England Leaders (1901)
- John Calvin (1906)
- Great Men of the Christian Church (1908)
- French Trans-Geneva (1909)
- A History of the Christian Church (1918)
