= List of fellows of the Royal Society elected in 1708 =

This is a list of fellows of the Royal Society elected in 1708.

== Fellows ==
- Charles Nicholas Ayres (fl. 1708)
- Robert Balle (d. 1733)
- John Bridges (1666–1724)
- Francesco Cornaro (1670–1734)
- William Fellowes (fl. 1708)
- Richard Foley (1681–1732)
- Thomas Grey, 2nd Earl of Stamford (1654–1720)
- David Hamilton (1663–1721)
- Archibald Hutcheson (c. 1660–1740)
- Jean Rodolphe Lavater (fl. 1704–1716)
- Edward Lawrence (d. 1725)
- Edward Lhuyd (1660–1709)
- George Markham (1666–1736)
- Thomas Milles (1671–1740)
- Benjamin Pratt (d. 1715)
- Philip Stanhope, 2nd Earl of Chesterfield (1633–1713)
- Richard Tighe (1678–1736)
- Michelangelo Tilli (1655–1740)
- Thomas Whalley (fl. 1708)
- Thomas Woodford (d. 1759)
