= John H. Leith =

American minister and writer

John Haddon Leith (September 10, 1919 – August 12, 2002) was a Presbyterian theologian and ordained minister who was the Pemberton Professor of Theology at Union Theological Seminary in Virginia from 1959 to 1990. He authored at least 18 books and countless essays on Christianity, over the years moving from a moderate to a strongly critical, conservative perspective on the Presbyterian Church (USA).

== Biography ==
John Haddon Leith was born in Hodges, South Carolina to William Hartnette Leith and Lucy Haddon Leith on September 10, 1919. At age 10 the Leith family moved to Due West, South Carolina where he remained while attending Erskine College in 1936, where he earned a B.A. degree by 1940. In 1943 Leith earned a B.D. degree from Columbia Theological Seminary. This same year Leith was ordained and licensed by the Presbyterian Church in the United States, or the "Southern Church," as colloquially known then. From there he went to Vanderbilt University, where he received his M.A. by 1946. From Vanderbilt Leith went on to Yale University, where he received his Ph.D. in 1949. Before becoming professor at Union Theological Seminary in Richmond, Va. 1959, Leith served as pastor at churches in Mobile, Alabama; Auburn, Alabama; and Nashville, Tennessee. He married Ann Caroline White on September 2, 1943. His children are Henry White Leith and Caroline Haddon Leith.

Leith was a member of various societies, including: The Synod of the Mid-Atlantic, New Hope Presbytery, Omicron Delta Kappa, The American Society of Church History. He also served as President of The Society for Reformation Research and the Calvin Studies Society from 1978 to 1982.

On August 12, 2002, John Haddon Leith died at the age of 82 at Greenville Memorial Hospital in Greenville, South Carolina.

== Bibliography ==
- Leith, John H.. John Calvin's Doctrine of the Christian Life. Louisville, Ky: Westminster/John Knox Press, 1989. ISBN 0-664-21330-8.
- Leith, John H.. Assembly at Westminster: Reformed Theology in the Making. Richmond, Va: John Knox Press, 1973. ISBN 0-8042-0885-9.
- Leith, John H.. (ED.) Creeds of the Churches: A Reader in Christian Doctrine, from the Bible to the Present. Atlanta: John Knox Press, 1982. ISBN 0-8042-0526-4.
- Leith, John H.; Johnson, William Stacy; Stroup, George W.. Reformed Reader: A Sourcebook in Christian Theology . Louisville, Ky: Westminster/John Knox Press, 1993. ISBN 0-664-21957-8.
- Leith, John H.. An Introduction to the Reformed Tradition: A Way of Being the Christian Community . Atlanta: John Knox Press, 1977. ISBN 0-8042-0471-3 .
- Calvin, John; Leith, John H. (Ed.). The Christian Life. San Francisco: Harper & Row, 1984. ISBN 0-06-061298-3.
- Leith, John H.; Raynal, Charles Edward. Pilgrimage of a Presbyterian: Collected Shorter Writings. Louisville, KY: Geneva Press, 2001. ISBN 0-664-50151-6.
- Leith, John H.. Basic Christian Doctrine. Louisville, KY: Westminster/John Knox Press, 1993. ISBN 0-664-25192-7.
- Leith, John H.. The Church, a Believing Fellowship. Atlanta, Ga.: John Knox Press, 1981. ISBN 0-8042-0518-3.
- Leith, John H.. The Reformed Imperative: What the Church Has to Say That No One Else Can Say . Philadelphia: Westminster Press, 1988. ISBN 0-664-25023-8.
- Leith, John H.. From Generation to Generation: The Renewal of the Church According to its Own Theology and Practice. Louisville, KY: Westminster/John Knox Press, 1990. ISBN 0-664-25122-6.
- Leith, John H.. Crisis In the Church: The Plight of Theological Education. Louisville, KY: Westminster John Knox Press, 1997. ISBN 0-664-25700-3.
- Leith, John H.. The Best of Times and the Worst of Times For Religion, Especially Christian Faith. Louisville, KY : Presbyterian Pub. Corp., 2001.
- Leith, John H.. Who Am I?. Auburn, Ala. : First Presbyterian Church, 1955.
- Leith, John H.. Who Is This Man?. Auburn, Ala. : First Presbyterian Church, 1955.
- Leith, John H.. The Pilgrim Church. Auburn, Ala. : First Presbyterian Church, 1954.
- Leith, John H.. Greenville Presbyterian Church: The Story of a People, 1765-1973. Greenwood County, S.C.: Greenville Presbyterian Church, 1973.
- Leith, John H.. Jonah, a Man Who Misunderstood God. Auburn, Ala. First Presbyterian Church, 1950.

== Sources ==
- Renowned theologian John H. Leith dies, Presbyterian Church in the United States of America, 13-August-2002, Alexa Smith
