= Lawrence House (Baltimore) =

Settlement house in Baltimore, Maryland

Coordinates: 39°17′14″N 76°37′43″W

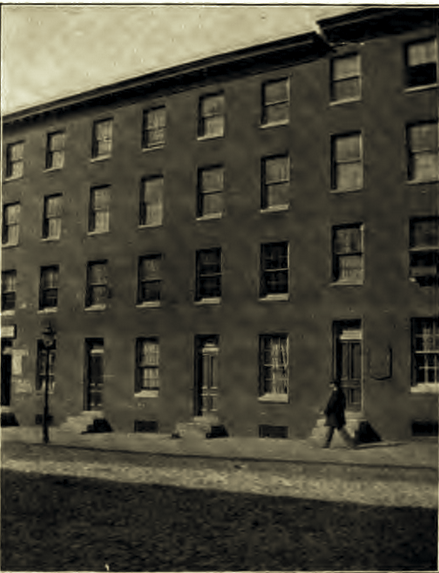
Lawrence House (1900)

Lawrence House was an American social settlement in Baltimore, Maryland. Its beginnings were in 1893, when Rev. Dr. Edward A. Lawrence and a friend took up lodging at 214 Parkin Street. Lawrence died suddenly later in 1893, and in his memory, the Lawrence Memorial Association organized in 1894 and purchased a house at 816 West Lombard Street. The settlement incorporated in the Fall of 1900. In 1904, the place was enlarged by the addition of the adjoining house, 814 West Lombard Street.

== History ==
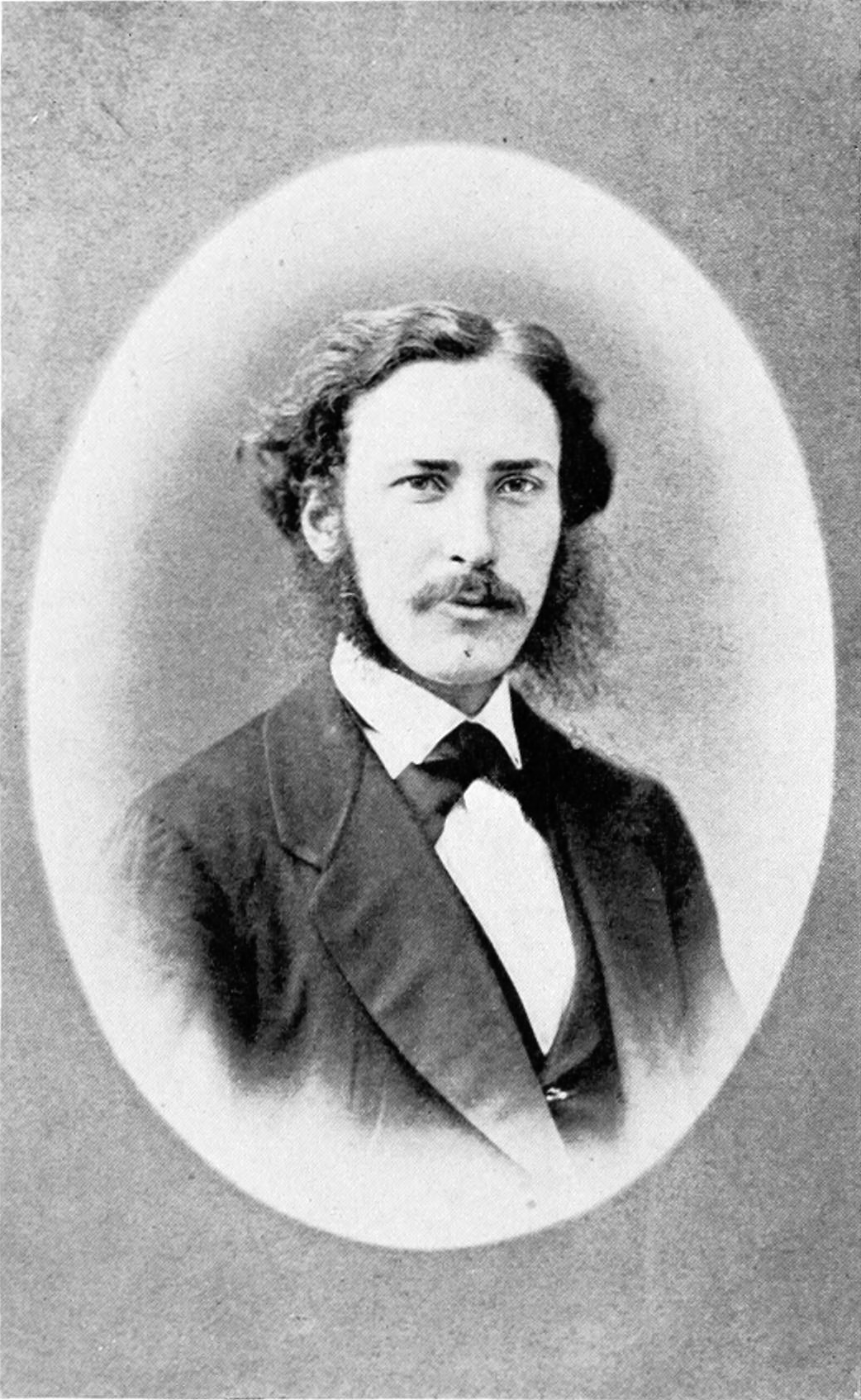
Edward A. Lawrence

The beginnings of settlement work in Baltimore were made early in 1893, when Lawrence took up lodgings with his friend, Frank Thompson, in one of the Winans tenements at 214 Parkin Street, in one of the poor districts of Baltimore. Dr. Lawrence had no idea of a settlement in the institutional sense of the term, and merely desired a sort of social retreat, where he could change his point of view from that of a leading pastor, and observe at first-hand the conditions and the people of a congested district. He died after a very brief illness, while the settlement in Baltimore was still only a small and obscure lodging on Parkin street.

In his memory, the Lawrence Memorial Association organized in 1894 and purchased a house at 816 West Lombard Street. The Association was composed of four constituent Societies having equal voice in the government of the House. These societies were: The Young Men's Christian Association of Johns Hopkins University, the Woman's College Chapter of the College Settlements Association, and the Christian Endeavor Societies of the Harlem Avenue Christian and the First Congregational Churches. The university and church societies cooperated actively in this work.

In the Fall of 1900, Lawrence House was established. A neighborhood club house, it aimed to be a center for things of interest to the people, to provide a place for amusements and social gatherings, and to furnish opportunities for instruction in any subject for which there was a demand. In cooperation with its neighbors, it aimed to work for the betterment of its particular community as well as the city.

== Neighborhood ==
It was located in an essentially industrial neighborhood. There were many large establishments, the principal ones being the Baltimore and Ohio shops on Pratt Street, and Bartlett and Hayward's Iron Foundry. People lived in the neighborhood where they worked, so that there was a settled population, and a real neighborhood feeling. Employment was steady and conditions were fairly favorable. The people were independent in character, self-respecting, and did not need material relief. They were largely Irish and German, though Poles, Lithuanians, Italians and Jews resided there as well.

== Architecture and fittings ==
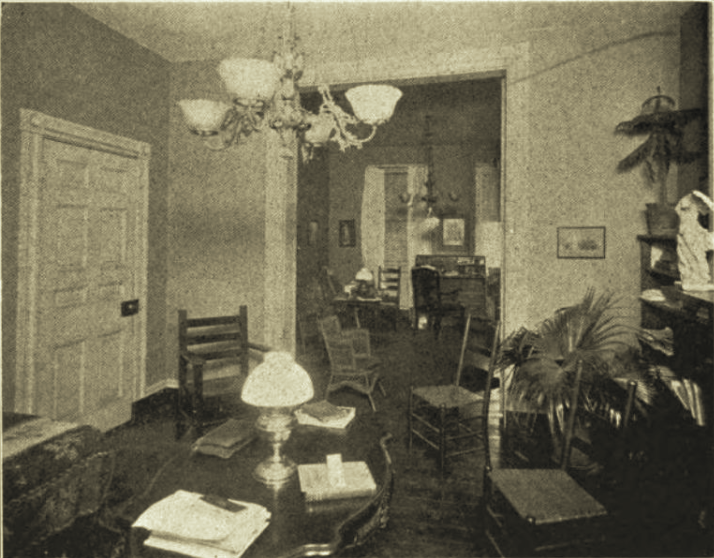
Reception room and director's office

For several years, the headquarters of the settlement activity were at 816 West Lombard Street. Within the last few months of 1904, the place was enlarged by the addition of the adjoining house, 814. During the summer, both houses were put in thorough repair, 816 having been put in order for club purposes and the newer acquisition having been fitted up and furnished as a home for the residents.

== Activities ==
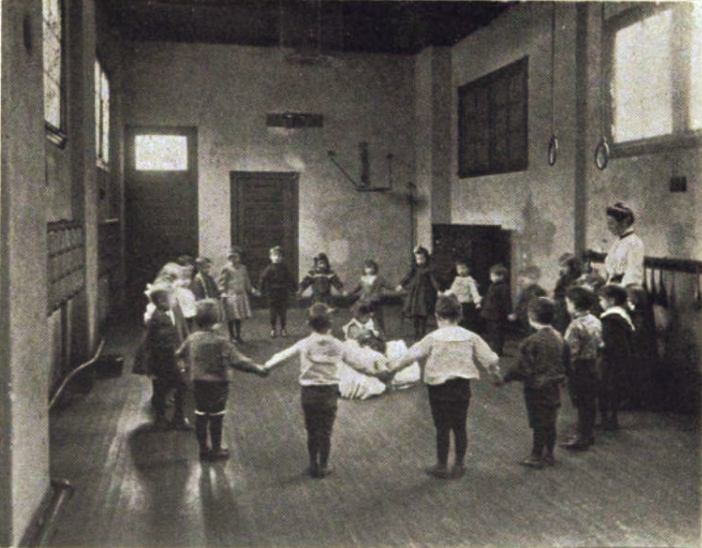
kindergarten

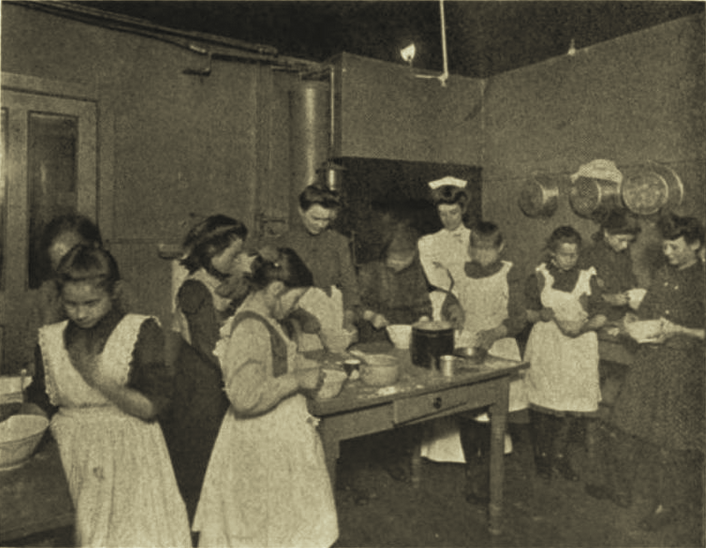
cooking class

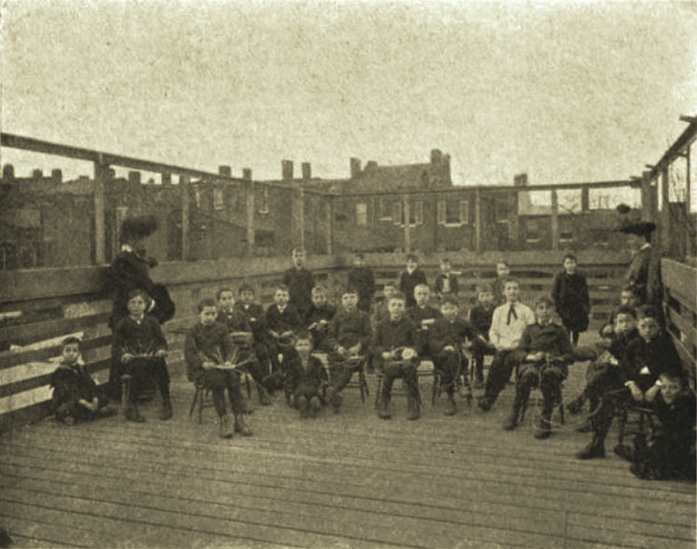
basket class

Lawrence House conducted investigations into different aspects of neighborhood life and conditions. It organized the Lawrence House Improvement Association, which published The Budget, a monthly neighborhood news sheet, for three years. The association was active in promoting the interests of the neighborhood. It cooperated in the work of the state Child Labor Committee, Consumers' League, Tenement House Commission, Trade School Committee, Playground Association and Tuberculosis Association.

The settlement maintained a library; kindergarten; playground; gymnasium; classes in chair caning, bent iron work, knife work, carpentry, drawing, athletics, embroidery, knitting, crocheting, cooking, millinery, clay modeling, arts and crafts; clubs with various interests, dramatic, debating, parliamentary drill, citizenship, story telling; game and pool rooms; dances; entertainments, concerts and lectures; and mothers' club. Summer work included a roof and backyard playground.

== People ==
In 1911, there were six women residents, 30 women volunteers, and six men volunteers. Head residents included, Emma G. Salisbury (Fall 1900 - June 1901); Alice E. Robbins (October 1902 - September 1908); Grace O. Edwards (Fall 1908 - June 1909); Elizabeth C. Bailey (September 1909 - September 1910; Josephine Hawks (Fall 1910 -).

== See also ==
- Settlement and community houses in the United States
