= Harvard Library =

Library system of Harvard University

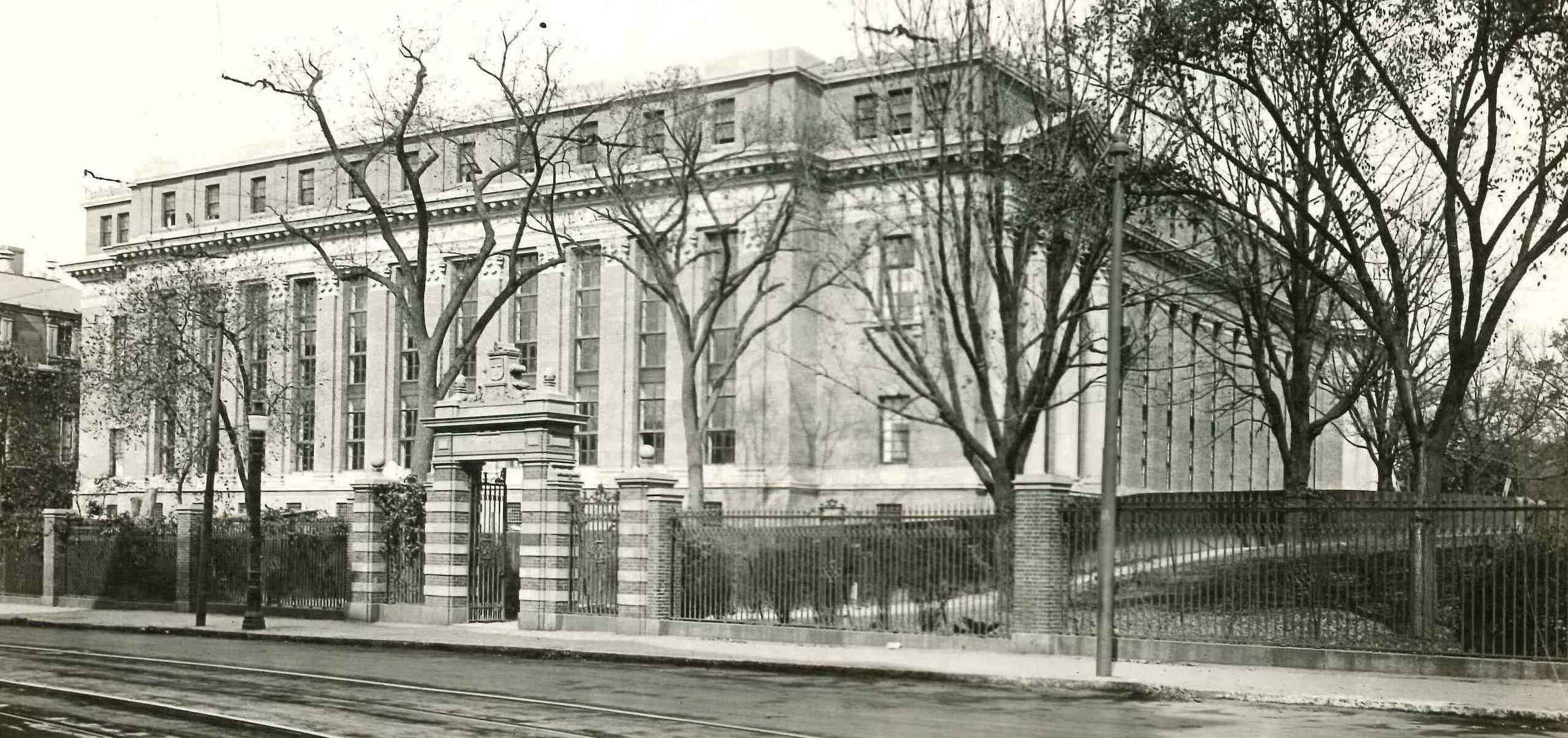
- Widener Library, the largest and primary library of Harvard University
- 42.3733923°N 71.1186862°W
- Location: Cambridge, Massachusetts, U.S.
- Type: Academic library system of Harvard University
- Established: 1638
- Branches: 28

Collection
- Items collected: 16,832,952 volumes held, 180,000 serial titles, an estimated 400 million manuscript items, 10 million photographs, 124 million archived web pages, and 5.4 terabytes of born-digital archives and manuscripts.
- Size: 16,832,952 volumes held (2022)

Access and use
- Circulation: 733,890 (2013)

Other information
- Budget: US$250 million (2020)
- Director: Martha Whitehead
- Employees: around 800 total (2020)
- Website: library.harvard.edu

Harvard Library is the network of libraries and services at Harvard University, a private Ivy League university in Cambridge, Massachusetts. Harvard Library is the oldest library system in the United States and both the largest academic library and largest private library in the world. Its collection holds over 20 million volumes, 400 million manuscripts, 10 million photographs, and one million maps.

Harvard Library holds the third-largest collection of all libraries in the United States, after the Library of Congress and Boston Public Library, by number of volumes held. Among libraries, measured on the number of all items held, it is the fifth-largest library in the nation. Harvard Library is a member of the Research Collections and Preservation Consortium (ReCAP); other members include Columbia University Libraries, Princeton University Library, New York Public Library, Yale University Library, and Ivy Plus Libraries Confederation, making over 90 million books available to the library's users.

The library is open to current Harvard affiliates, and some events and spaces are open to the public. The largest and most recognized building in the Harvard Library system is Widener Library in Harvard Yard.

== History ==
Harvard's library initially grew primarily from personal donations. The first donation was by John Harvard, a Puritan minister, who left the school his scholar's library of 400 volumes, primarily on religion and philosophy.

Until 1676, the library was based in Old College building. That year, it moved to Harvard Hall, where it remained until 1764. By 1764 it was the largest library in British America, with 5,000 volumes, but disaster struck that year when the library was destroyed by fire. A new Harvard Hall was built, and 15,000 books were collected to create the new library. After the fire, readers in the library were not allowed candles or lamps and if there was a fire burning in the hearth, a librarian or assistant had to be present. Harvard patrons were allowed to borrow and return up to three books at a time on Friday mornings and were allowed to keep them for up to six weeks. Thomas Hollis V, great-nephew of one of Harvard College's early benefactors, began shipping thousands of specially chosen volumes to the library. Hollis continued to send books regularly until his death in 1774, and he bequeathed £500 for the college to continue acquiring books. This became Harvard's first endowed book fund, and the fund has grown annually since. Harvard Library's online catalog, HOLLIS, a backronym for "Harvard On-Line Library Information System", is named after him.

In 1841, with space limited in Harvard Hall, the library was moved to Gore Hall in 1841. In 1912, the library moved again after Gore Hall became unsuitable, and the library was moved into multiple buildings with some of the buildings representing specialized topics.

Completed in 1915 as a replacement for Gore Hall, Widener Library became the primary library on the Harvard campus.

Some books were digitized in Google Books under the management of former Harvard Library director Sidney Verba.

== Holdings ==
Harvard Library houses a range of historical artifacts and primary documents from around the world, including one of only 23 complete Gutenberg Bibles. The largest collection of East Asian-language material outside of East Asia is held in the Harvard–Yenching Library.

The largest collection of archives focused on business and economic history is housed in Baker Library/Bloomberg Center at Harvard Business School. Botany Libraries’ archives include Henry David Thoreau’s personal herbaria, letters from Charles Darwin to Asa Gray, and thousands of botanical illustrations. The Wolbach Library, which was established in 1975 and closed March 22, 2024, held the oldest surviving images of the Moon. It was formed by merging the collections of the Harvard College Observatory and the Smithsonian Astrophysical Observatory. The Tozzer Library is one of the oldest anthropological libraries in the world.

Harvard Library also has a robust collection of digital content. More than 6 million digital objects are accessible online by anyone, regardless of whether or not they're affiliated with Harvard, via the Harvard Digital Collections page.

The CURIOSity tool offers another way to explore Harvard's digital collections, providing curated views, specialized search options and discovery of unique content. Curated collections include the Worlds of Change collection, which includes materials from 17th and 18th century North America, as well as the Islamic Heritage Project, and over 3500 digitized daguerreotypes.

== Publications ==
By 1973, Harvard Library had authored or published over 430 volumes in print in addition to nine periodicals and seven annual publications. Among these is a monthly newsletter, The Harvard Librarian and a quarterly journal, Harvard Library Bulletin, which was established in 1947, dormant from 1960 until 1967, and published regularly since. The Bulletin is published three times a year in spring, summer, and fall. Harvard Library Bulletin is available to the public under subscription and an archive of past issues is available on Harvard Library website.

== Organizational structure ==
Harvard Library is the formal name for an administrative entity within the central administration that oversees the development and implementation of strategies that facilitate access to research, collections, services, and space in ways that raise the value of the university's investment in its libraries. As of June 2019, Martha Whitehead is the current vice president for Harvard Library and the Roy E. Larsen Librarian of the Faculty of Arts and Sciences. The Harvard Library holds or offers:

- Access Services connects the academic community to the vast array of library resources.
- Information and Technical Services is responsible for acquiring, licensing and providing access to tangible and online collections in all formats.
- Preservation, Conservation and Digital Imaging Services is committed to ensuring that library materials remain secure and usable for contemporary and future scholars by conserving materials, digitizing collections, preserving library content in digital formats and providing robust education and outreach programs.
- Harvard University Archives is the university's institutional archives. It oversees the university's permanent records, collects Harvard-related manuscripts, papers, and historical materials, and supervises records management across the university.
- Finance supports the library by providing accurate information that assists decision-making, maintaining the integrity of finance systems and completing financial transactions.
- Program Management ensures that potential projects and approved projects are managed in a considered, predictable and transparent way.
- Open Scholarship and Research Data Services provides for open access to works of scholarship produced by the Harvard community.

== Governance ==
=== Library Visiting Committee ===
Visiting Committee members are experts and Harvard alumni who are appointed by the corporation. The committee oversees the strategy and administration of Harvard Library on behalf of the Overseers. Bi-annual visits and regular updates by the Office of the Provost provide an opportunity for Visiting Committee members to understand and advise on the Harvard Library's progress.

=== Library Board ===
The Library Board is charged with reviewing strategic plans of the Harvard Library and assessing its progress in meeting those plans, reviewing system-wide policies and standards and overseeing progress of the central services. The provost chairs the Library Board (established in December 2010) and the Office of the Provost is responsible for overseeing the Harvard Library. The Harvard Library Board is composed of six permanent members and five rotating members who serve three years each, with their initial terms staggered. The permanent members include the provost, the Carl H. Pforzheimer University Professor, and the deans or designees from the Faculty of Arts and Sciences, Harvard Business School, Harvard Law School, and Harvard Medical School.

Rotating members include three at-large, tenured faculty members, as well as deans or designees from Harvard Kennedy School, Harvard Graduate School of Design, Harvard Divinity School, Harvard Graduate School of Education, Harvard School of Public Health, Harvard School of Engineering and Applied Sciences, and Radcliffe Institute.

=== Faculty Advisory Committee ===
In 2011, the Harvard Library Faculty Advisory Council was established to advise the university.

=== Library Council on Student Experience ===
Established in 2012, the Library Council on Student Experience is a joint council consisting of librarians and students from across the university who identify and work together on University-wide priorities identified by the council for improving the student library experience. The council is co-chaired by a librarian appointed by the vice president for Harvard Library and by a student elected from student council members. Students and librarians are nominated by the university's library directors and selected by the Office of the Provost. Other members include representatives from the Tell Us project, the Berkman Institute, and Harvard Library Shared Services. Terms are for two academic years. The Council makes recommendations to and is supported by the vice president for Harvard Library.

=== Library Leadership Team ===
Harvard Library Leadership Team is responsible for planning, prioritizing and implementing joint library initiatives. The team works with the vice president for the Harvard Library to develop and implement library-wide strategy and policy approved by the Board in collaboration with other standing committees and working groups.

== Harvard libraries ==
Harvard Library includes a total of 25 individual libraries with shared circulation, cataloging, and preservation services, including:

- Arnold Arboretum's Horticultural Library at Arnold Arboretum
- Baker Library/Bloomberg Center at Harvard Business School
- Biblioteca Berenson in Florence, Italy
- Botany Libraries
- Cabot Science Library at Harvard Science Center
- Countway Library at Harvard Medical School and Harvard T.H. Chan School of Public Health
- Dumbarton Oaks Research Library at Dumbarton Oaks in Washington, D.C.
- Ernst Mayr Library at the Museum of Comparative Zoology
- Fine Arts Library at the Littauer Center
- Frances Loeb Library at Harvard Graduate School of Design
- Fung Library at the Center for Government and International Studies
- Gutman Library at Harvard Graduate School of Education
- Harvard Divinity School Library at Harvard Divinity School
- Harvard Film Archive at the Carpenter Center for the Visual Arts
- Harvard Kennedy School Library and Research Services at Harvard Kennedy School
- Harvard Law School Library at Harvard Law School
- Harvard Map Collection
- Harvard University Archives
- Harvard–Yenching Library
- Houghton Library
- Lamont Library
- Loeb Music Library
- Robbins Library of Philosophy
- Susan Wojcicki Library
- Arthur and Elizabeth Schlesinger Library on the History of Women in America at Radcliffe Institute
- Tozzer Library
- Widener Library, the main library at Harvard College

== Librarians ==
=== 17th century ===
- Solomon Stoddard, 1667–1672
- Samuel Sewall, 1674
- Daniel Gookin, 1674–1676, 1679–1681
- Daniel Allin, 1676–1679
- John Cotton, 1681–1690
- Henry Newman, 1690–1693
- Ebenezer Pemberton, 1693–1697
- Nathaniel Saltonstall, 1697–1701

=== 18th century ===
- Anthony Stoddard, 1701–1702
- Josiah Willard, 1702–1703
- John Whiting, 1703–1706
- John Gore, 1706–1707
- Nathaniel Gookin, 1707–1709
- Edward Holyoke, 1709–1712
- Thomas Robie, 1712–1713
- John Denison, 1713–1714
- John Rogers, 1714–1718
- William Welsteed, 1718–1720
- William Cooke, 1720–1721
- Joshua Gee, 1721–1722
- Mitchell Sewall, 1722–1723
- John Hancock, 1723–1726
- Stephen Sewall, 1726–1728
- Joseph Champney, 1728–1729
- Joseph Pynchon, 1729–1730
- Henry Gibbs, 1730–1734
- Samuel Coolidge, 1734–1735
- James Diman, 1735–1737
- Samuel Cooke, 1737
- Thomas Marsh, 1737–1741
- Belcher Hancock, 1741–1742
- Benjamin Prat, 1742–1743
- Matthew Cushing, 1743–1748
- Oliver Peabody, 1748–1750
- Stephen Badger, 1751–1753
- John Rand, 1753–1755
- Mather Byles, 1755–1757
- Elizur Holyoke, 1757–1758
- Edward Brooks, 1758–1760
- Samuel Deane, 1760–1762
- Stephen Sewall, 1762–1763
- Andrew Eliot, 1763–1767
- Jonathan Moore, 1767–1768
- Nathaniel Ward, 1768
- Caleb Prentice, 1768–1769
- William Mayhew, 1769–1772
- James Winthrop, 1772–1787
- Isaac Smith, 1787–1791
- Thaddeus Mason Harris, 1787, 1791–1793
- Samuel Shapleigh, 1793–1800

=== 19th century ===
- Sidney Willard, 1800–1805
- Peter Nourse, 1805–1808
- Samuel Cooper Thacher, 1808–1811
- John Lovejoy Abbot, 1811–1813
- Andrews Norton, 1813–1821
- Joseph Green Cogswell, 1821–1823
- Charles Folsom, 1823–1826
- Benjamin Peirce, 1826–1831
- Thaddeus William Harris, 1831–1856
- John Langdon Sibley, 1856–1877
- Justin Winsor, 1877–1897
- William Coolidge Lane, 1898–1910

=== 20th century ===
- Archibald Cary Coolidge, 1910–1928
- Robert Pierpont Blake, 1928–1937
- Keyes Metcalf, 1937–1955
- Paul Herman Buck, 1955–1964
- Merle Fainsod, 1964–1972
- Douglas W. Bryant, 1964–1979 (University Librarian, 1964–1979; Director of the University Library, 1972–1979)
- Louis E. Martin, 1972–1979 (Librarian of Harvard College)
- Oscar Handlin, 1972–1984, (Carl Pforzheimer University Professor, 1972-; Director of the University Library, 1979–1984)
- Sidney Verba, 1984–2006

=== 21st century ===
- Robert Darnton, 2007–2015 (Carl H. Pforzheimer University Professor and University Librarian)
- Sarah Thomas, 2013–2018 (Vice President for the Harvard Library and University Librarian, Roy E. Larsen Librarian for the Faculty of Arts and Sciences)
- Martha Whitehead, 2019–Present (Harvard Library vice president and university Librarian, Roy E. Larsen Librarian for the Faculty of Arts and Sciences)

== See also ==
- Boston Medical Library
- Dataverse
- Google Books Library Project
- JHOVE
- List of online image archives
