= Isaac Smith =

Isaac Smith may refer to:

- Isaac Smith (American football) (born 2004), American football player
- Isaac Smith (footballer) (born 1988), Australian rules footballer
- Isaac Smith (New Jersey politician) (1740–1807), United States Representative from New Jersey
- Isaac Smith (Pennsylvania politician) (1761–1834), United States Representative from Pennsylvania
- Isaac Smith (priest) (active 1600s), Anglican priest in Ireland
- Isaac Smith (Royal Navy officer) (1752–1831), Royal Navy officer and the first European to set foot in eastern Australia
- Isaac Smith Jr. (1749–1829), American minister and librarian
- Isaac C. Smith (1797–1877), New York sail and steamboat captain, shipbuilder, sparmaker and entrepreneur
- Isaac D. Smith (born 1932), US Army general
- Isaac E. Smith (1858–1940), boat builder who built the first Star Class sailboats
- Isaac W. Smith (surveyor) (1826–1897), American soldier and surveyor
- USS Isaac Smith, a merchant steamboat built in 1861 that served as a Union Navy gunboat, and later a Confederate blockade runner, during the American Civil War
