= Jove (disambiguation) =

Jove (from Proto-Italic *djous "day, sky") usually refers to the god Jupiter.

Jove may also refer to:

- JOVE (Jonathan's Own Version of Emacs), an open-source text editor
- Jove (tribe), a Native American tribe
- Jove, Gijón, Asturias, Spain
- Jove Books, an imprint of Penguin Group
- Jove Francisco, Filipino newscaster
- Journal of Visualized Experiments (JoVE)

== See also ==
- JHOVE (JSTOR/Harvard Object Validation Environment), pronounced "jove"
- Giove (disambiguation), the Italian name for Jupiter or Jove
