= John Clarke (Congregationalist minister) =

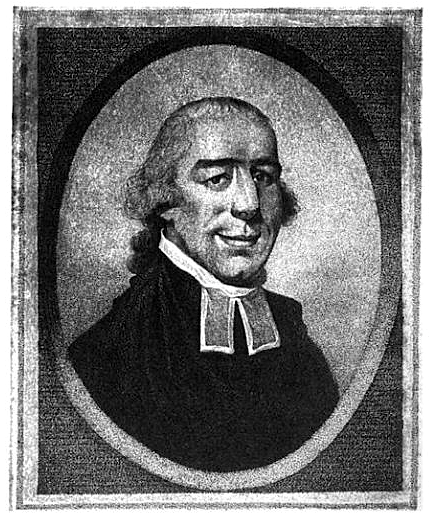
Portrait of John Clarke

John Clarke (1755–1798) was a minister of the First Church in Boston, Massachusetts, in the late 18th century. He was born in Portsmouth, New Hampshire, on April 13, 1755, to John Clarke and Sarah Clarke. He was educated at the Boston Public Latin School (class of 1761) and Harvard University (class of 1774; MA 1777). He joined the ministry of Boston's First Church in January 1778, and remained there until his death at age 42. He was a charter member of the American Academy of Arts and Sciences in 1780. He was associated with the Boston Library Society; the Humane Society of Massachusetts; and the Massachusetts Historical Society. Clarke married Esther Orne; they had four children. He died in Boston on April 2, 1798.

== Works by Clarke ==
- A letter to Doctor [Samuel] Mather. Occasioned by his disingenuous reflexions upon a certain pamphlet, entitled, Salvation for all men. 1782.
- A sermon delivered at the church in Brattle-Street, January 2, 1784 : at the interment of the Rev. Samuel Cooper, D.D. who expired, December 29, 1783.
- A discourse, delivered at the First Church in Boston, February 15, 1787. At the interment of the Rev. Charles Chauncy, D.D. A.A.S. Its Senior Pastor, who expired, Feb. 10, 1787.
- A discourse delivered before the Humane Society of the Commonwealth of Massachusetts : at the semi-annual meeting, eleventh of June 1793.
- An answer to the question, why are you a Christian? (1795)
- A discourse, delivered at the First Church in Boston, April 19, 1795, the Lord's-Day after the interment of Nathaniel W. Appleton, M.D. 1796.
- Letters to a student in the University of Cambridge, Massachusetts (1796)
- Sermons by the late Reverend John Clarke, D.D. Minister of the First Church in Boston, Massachusetts. Boston: Samuel Hall. 1799.

== Sources ==
- Ellis, A. B (1881). History of the First Church in Boston, 1630–1880. Boston: Hall & Whiting.
