= Boston Library =

Boston Library may refer to:

In Massachusetts, USA:

- The Boston Public Library,
  - the Boston Public Library, McKim Building, a branch of the Boston Public Library
- Boston Athenaeum, one of the oldest independent proprietary libraries in the United States
- Boston Library Society (1792-1939)
- Boston Medical Library, the largest academic medical library in the world. Combined with Harvard's medical collections, it is also known as the Countway Library of Medicine
- Congregational Library, a denominationally-independent research library of religious literature, located in Boston's Beacon Hill neighborhood
