= First Church in Boston =

Unitarian Universalist church in Massachusetts

Coordinates: 42°21′13.7″N 71°4′28.3″W

- First Church of Boston
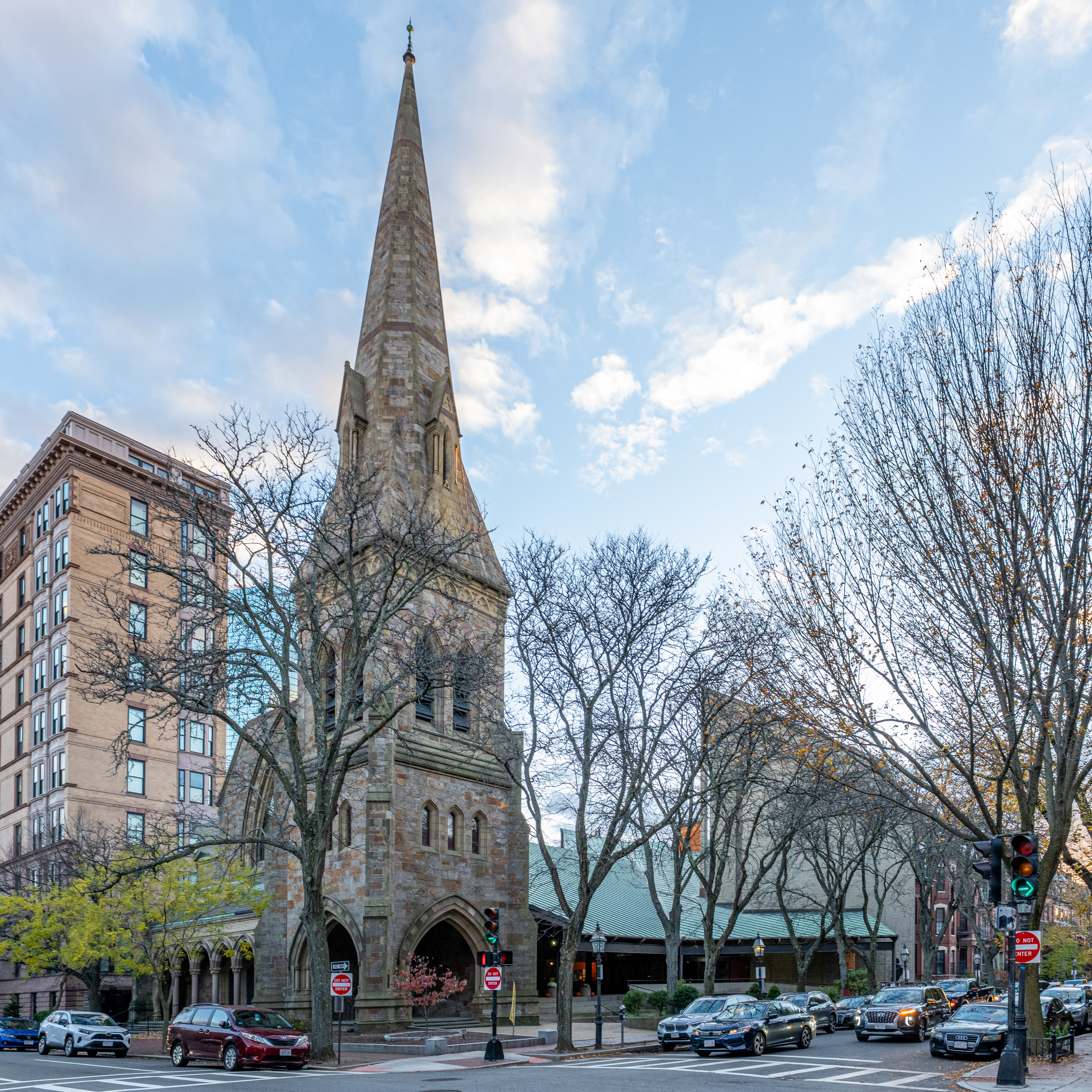
- First Church in 2025
- First Church in Boston
- Location: 66 Marlborough Street; Boston, Massachusetts
- Country: US
- Denomination: Unitarian Universalist
- Previous denomination: Congregationalist
- Website: firstchurchboston.org

History
- Status: Active
- Founded: 1630

First Church in Boston is a Unitarian Universalist Church (originally Congregationalist) founded in 1630 by John Winthrop's original Puritan settlement in Boston, Massachusetts. The current building, located in the Back Bay neighborhood, was designed by Paul Rudolph in a modernist style after a fire in 1968. It incorporates part of the earlier gothic revival building designed by William Robert Ware and Henry Van Brunt in 1867. The church has long been associated with Harvard University and Boston's Freedom Trail, which includes the burial site of John Winthrop—Massachusetts's first Governor who, as a member of First Church, fought for truth-telling and freedom.

== History ==
The church congregation was established in 1630, when the settlers on the Arbella arrived at the site of present-day Charlestown, Boston, Massachusetts. John Wilson was the first minister, and the only minister while the church was in Charlestown. Two years later, they constructed a meeting house across the Charles River near what is now State Street in Boston, and Wilson was officially installed as minister there. In 1633 John Cotton arrived from England, and was a teaching elder at the church, helping to establish the foundation of the Congregational Church, the official state church of Massachusetts. His philosophies influenced John Owen, chaplain to Oliver Cromwell.

Massachusetts Bay Colony pastors occasionally visited and preached in each other's churches. First Church pastors gave guest sermons at other churches at the colony's settlements; Governor Winthrop accompanied his pastor when walking twenty-five miles to deliver a sermon at Plymouth.

In 1677 Dorcas ye blackmore, a freed slave, became the first African American allowed to become a member of the church.

In the 18th century, Charles Chauncy was a minister at First Church for sixty years, where he gained a reputation for opposing what he believed was the emotionalism of Jonathan Edwards during the Great Awakening.

A schism developed at the turn of the 19th century: this Trinitarian Christian church eventually transformed into a Unitarian congregation by the mid-19th century, as did many of the other state churches in Massachusetts. Massachusetts' state churches (largely Unitarian and Congregationalist, including First Church), were officially disaffiliated from the government in 1833.

In the 19th century, the First Church moved to Back Bay in Boston. The building at 66 Marlborough Street in Boston dated from 1868, and was designed by Boston architects William Robert Ware and Henry Van Brunt.

Second Church, also known as the "Church of the Mathers", was founded in 1649 when the population spread to the North End and justified an additional congregation sited closer to those individuals' homes. From 1664 to 1741, its clergy consisted of Increase Mather, Cotton Mather, and Samuel Mather. Both churches were, later in their histories, examples of the westward movement of Boston churches from the crowded, older downtown area to the newer, more fashionable Back Bay. This area was developed for residential use after lowlands were filled in during the late 19th and early 20th centuries. Second Church's Back Bay location in the Fenway was sold (it is now owned by the Ruggles St. Baptist congregation) just before the merger.

After a disastrous fire in 1968, First Church and Second Church merged and built a new building at the 66 Marlborough Street location.

== Architecture ==
The current building incorporates the ruined street facade and "puddingstone" steeple tower of the previous church on the site (by Ware & van Brunt, 1868), which had burned in 1968. After a call for designs, the congregation voted for the proposal by Paul Rudolph, which was completed in 1972.

The light-flooded, soaring interior is finished with Rudolph's characteristic bush hammered "corduroy concrete" surfaces. Decades later, the interiors are immaculately preserved. Great care has been taken not to permanently change the walls, and to reproduce the original textile decorations.

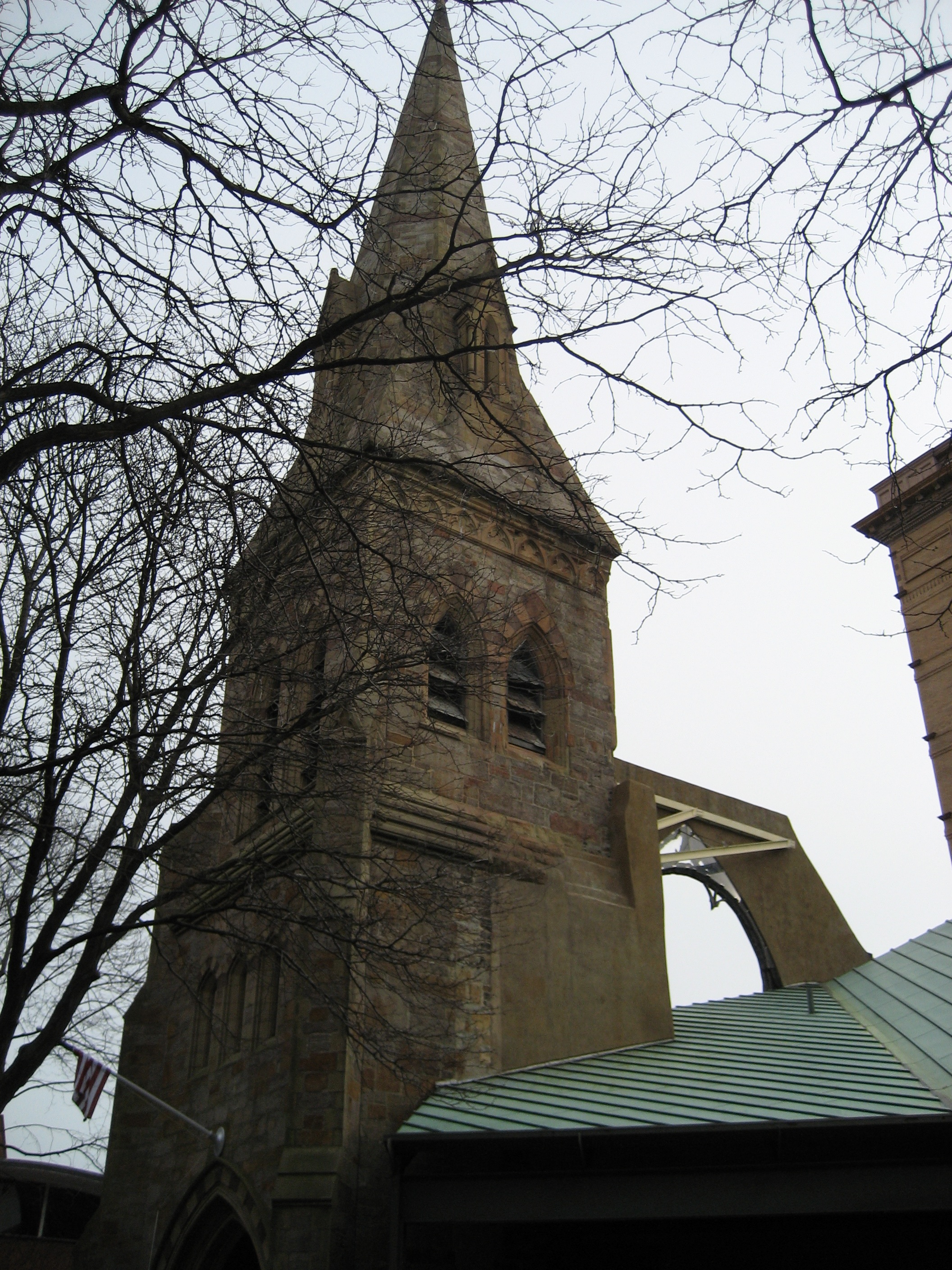
1868 steeple tower

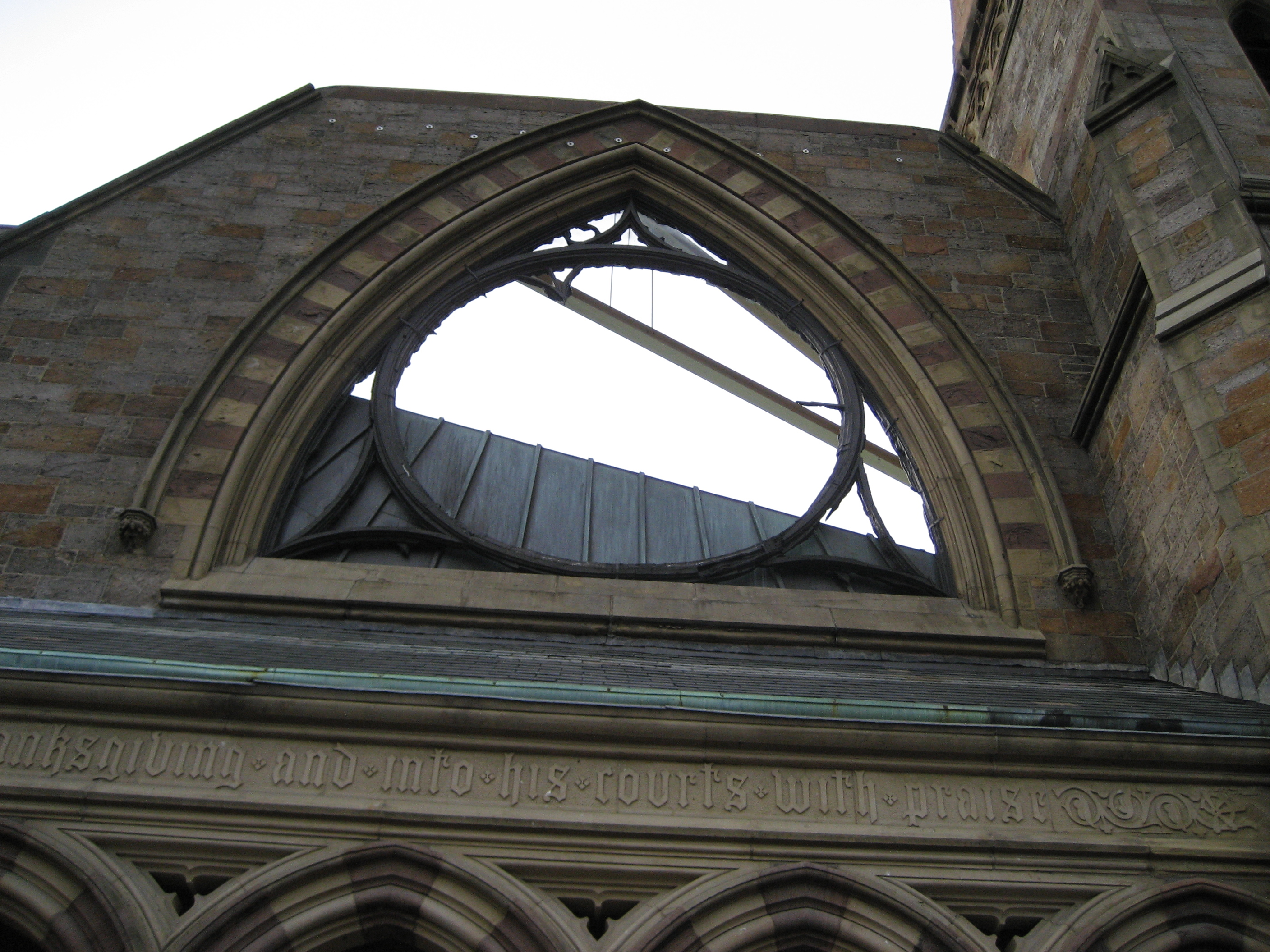
Charred rose window frame and facade

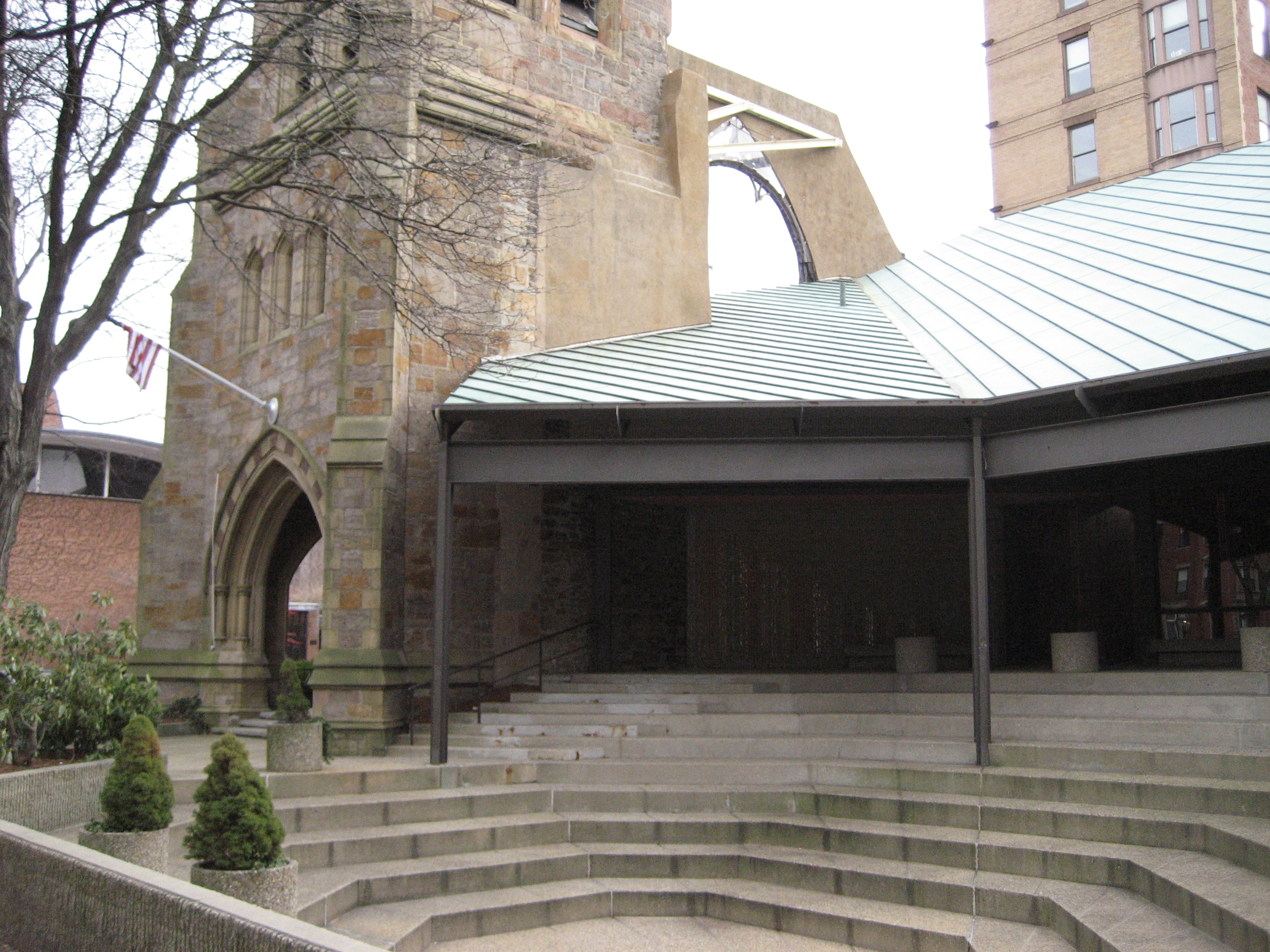
Exterior steps forming an amphitheater

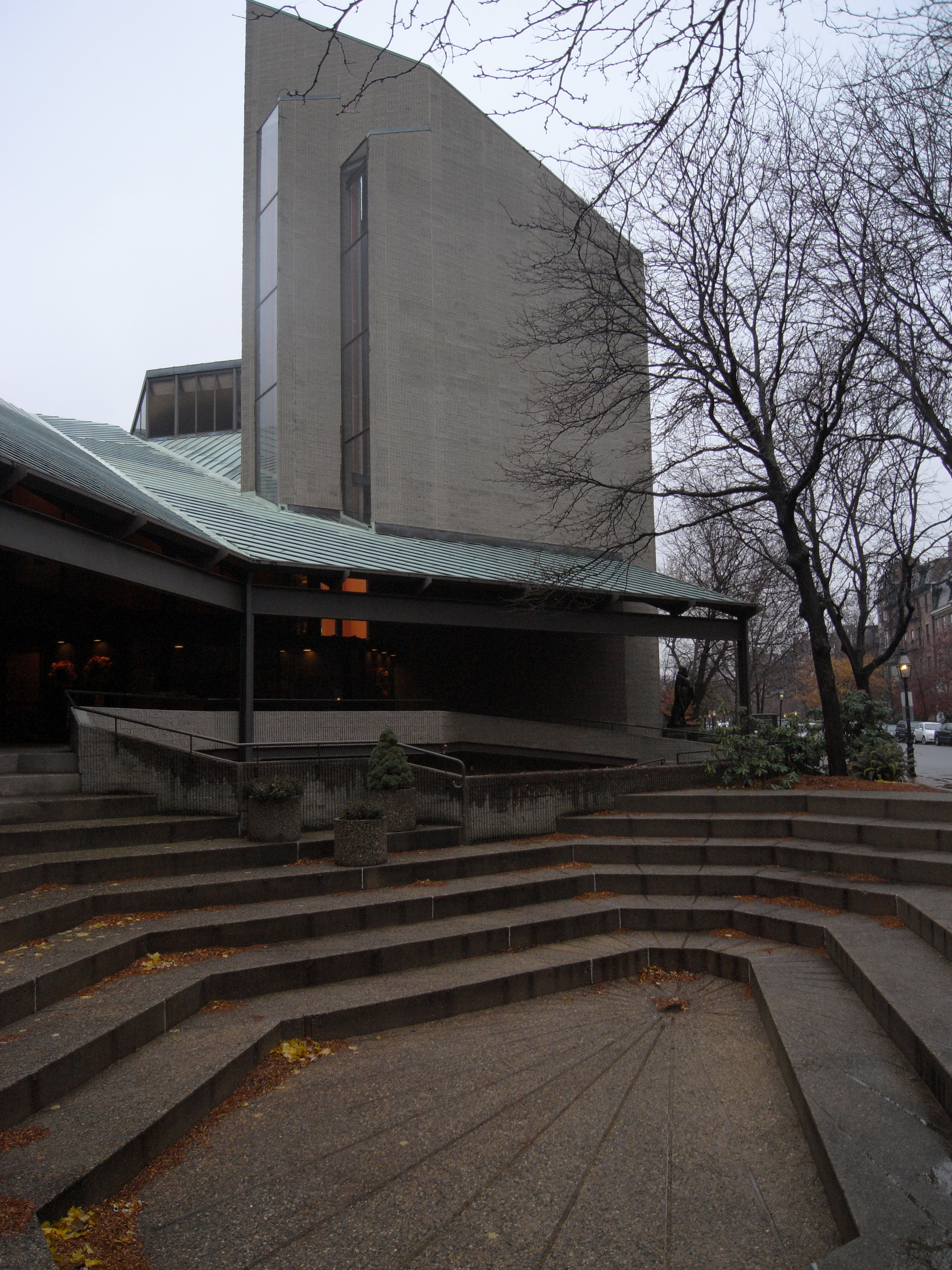
View towards sanctuary

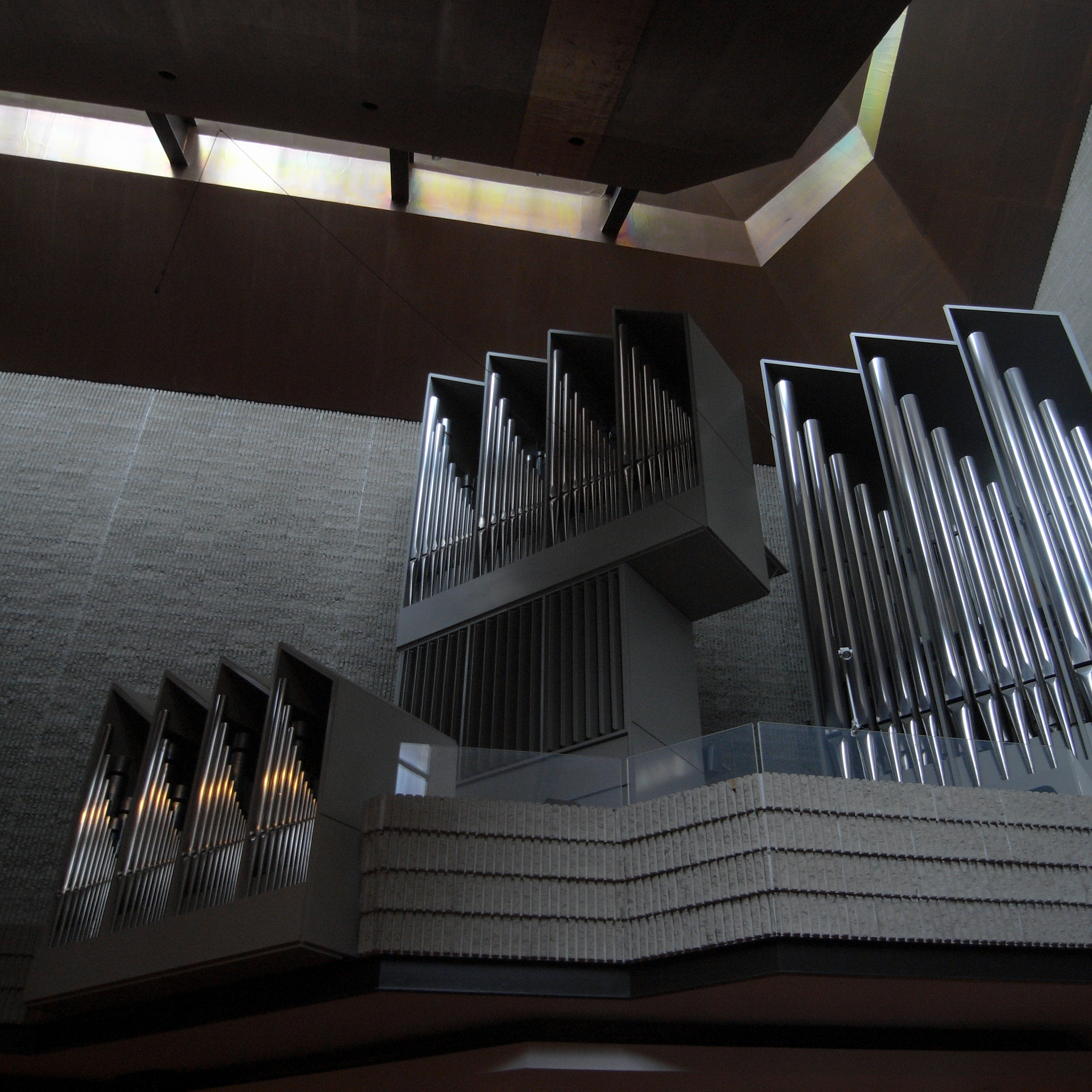
Organ loft, finished in "corduroy concrete"

== Notable people associated with the church ==
- Lowell Mason (organist 1807–1811)
- John Wilson (pastor 1632–1667; died 1667)
- John Cotton (pastor 1633–1652)
- John Winthrop, founder and governor of Massachusetts Bay Colony
- Stephen Winthrop, son of John Winthrop
- John Norton (pastor 1656–1663)
- John Eliot (pastor for 6 months in 1631)
- John Wheelwright (pastor)
- Valentine Hill, (deacon)
- Robert Keayne, (member/note-taker)
- Benjamin Keanye, (member)
- Samuel Whiting Snr. (member 1636)
- John Davenport (pastor 1668–1670)
- Thomas Cobbet (reverend 1645)
- Joshua Scottow (member from March 1639, "in company" with Rev. Thomas Cobbett and Valentine Hill (First Church reverend and deacon respectively) as creditors in 1652 to Jane Skipper (c. 1635–1682) "spinster of Boston")
- James Allen (pastor 1668–1710; died 1710)
- John Oxenbridge (pastor 1670–1674)
- Joshua Moodey (pastor 1684–1692; died 1697)
- John Bailey (pastor 1693–1697; died 1697)
- Benjamin Wadsworth (pastor 1696–1737)
- Thomas Bridge (pastor 1705–1715; died 1715)
- Thomas Foxcroft (pastor 1717–1769)
- Charles Chauncy (pastor 1727–1787)
- John Clarke (pastor 1778–1798)
- William Emerson (pastor 1799–1811)
- John Lovejoy Abbot (pastor 1813–1814)
- Nathaniel Langdon Frothingham (minister 1815–1850)
- Sophia Henrietta Emma Hewitt (music director 1815–1817(?), daughter of James Hewitt
- Charles Zeuner (music director 1839–?)
- Lucien H Southard (music director 1848–?)
- Rufus Ellis (pastor 1853–c. 1885; died 1885)
- Whitney Eugene Thayer (music director 1869–1875)
- Arthur Foote (music director 1878–1910)
- Charles Edwards Park (minister 1906–1946, emeritus 1946–1962)
- Rhys Williams (minister 1960–2000)
- Stephen Kendrick (minister 2001–present)
- Paul Cienniwa (music director 2006–2017)

== Gallery ==
=== State St. (1632–1639) ===
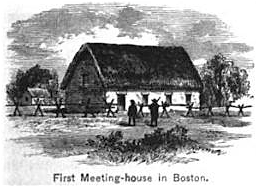
First meeting house, built 1632

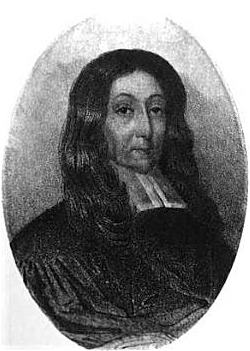
John Wilson (pastor 1632–1667)

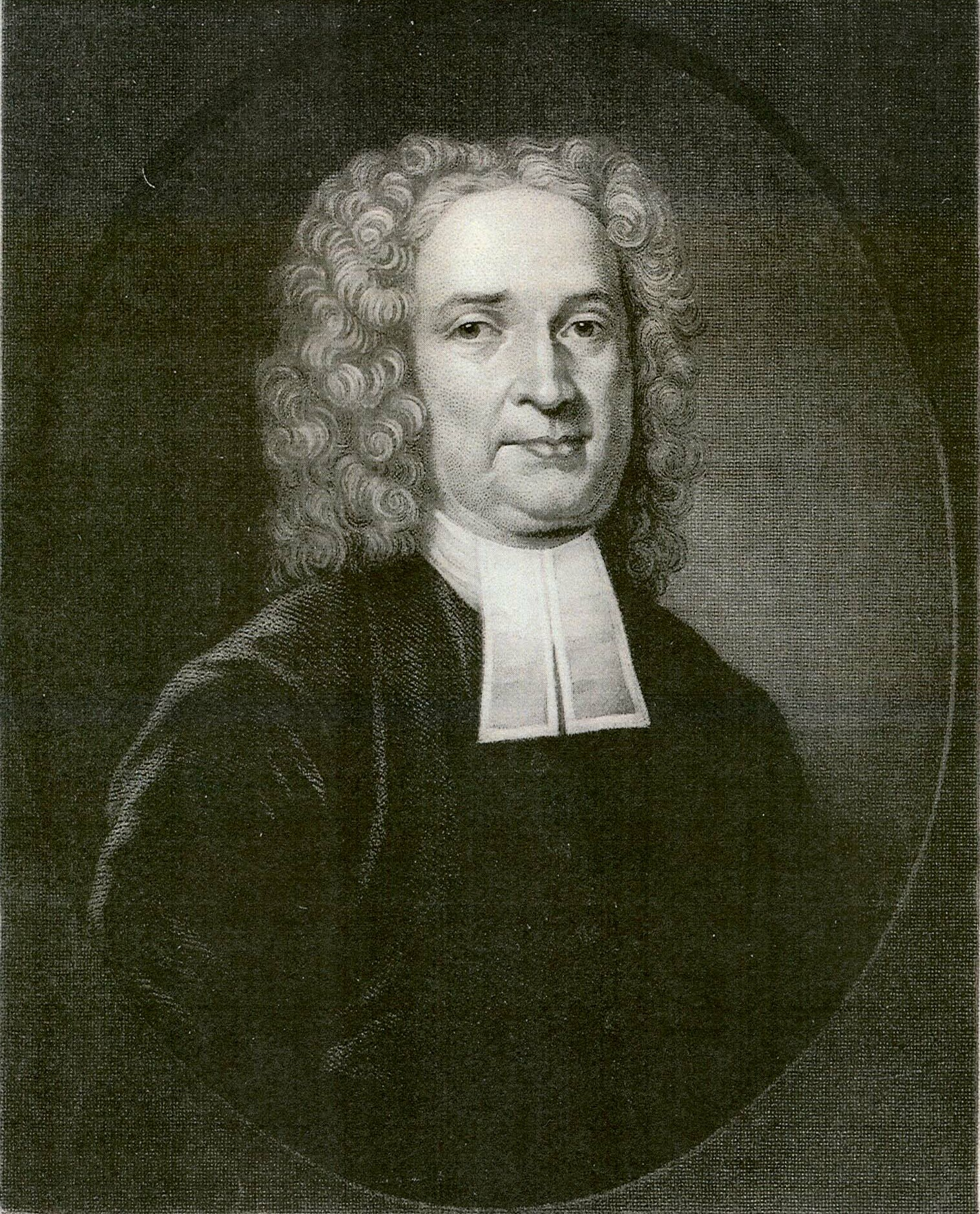
John Cotton (pastor 1633–1652)

=== Washington St. (1639–1808) ===
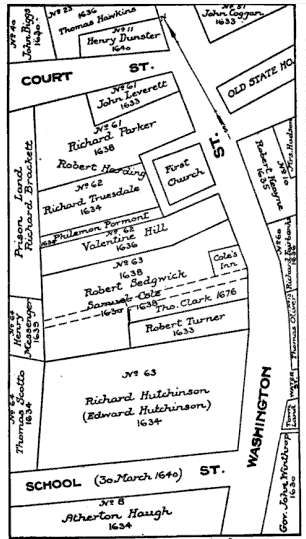
Location near Old State House, 17th century

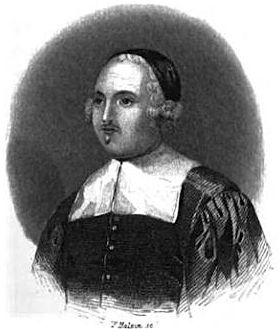
John Davenport (pastor 1668–1670)

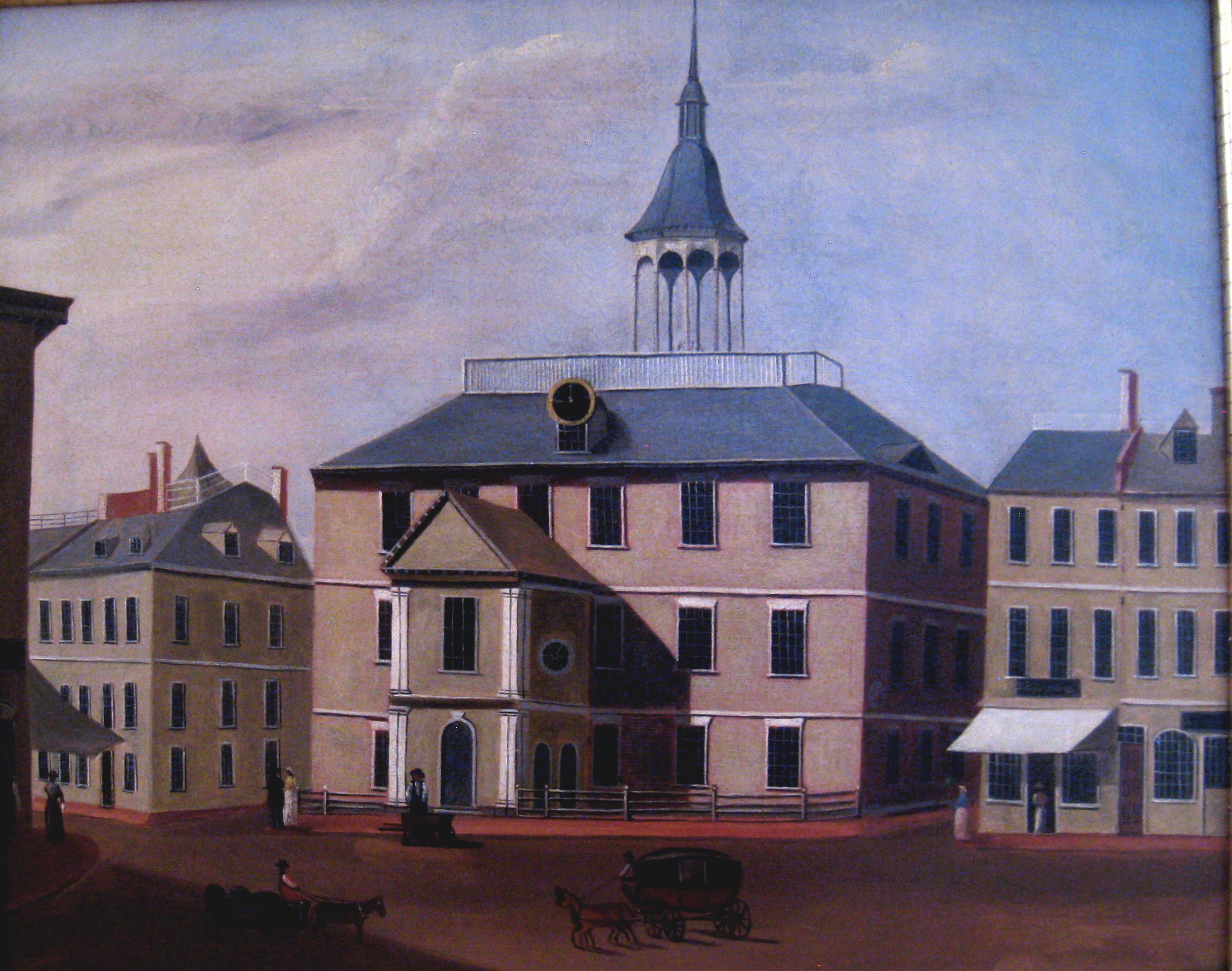
Old Brick Church, Washington St., built 1713

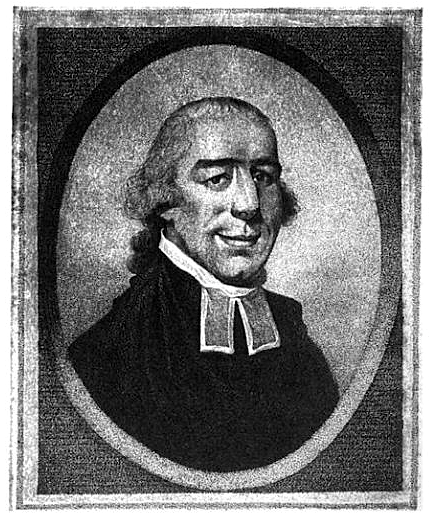
John Clarke (pastor 1778–1798)

=== Chauncy Place (1808–1867) ===
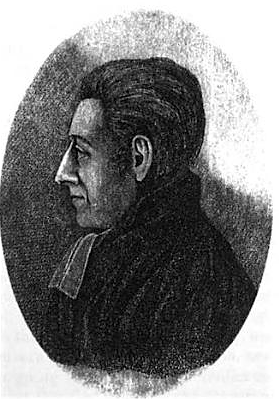
William Emerson (pastor 1799–1811)

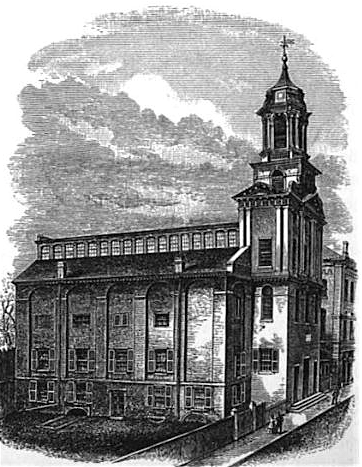
Chauncy Place, 1808–1867

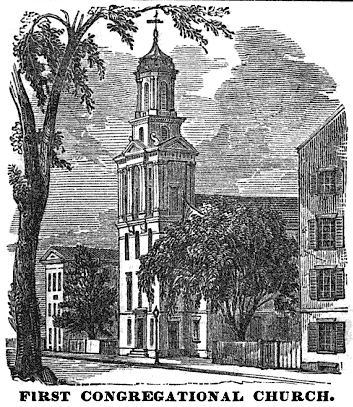
Chauncy Place, 1808–1867

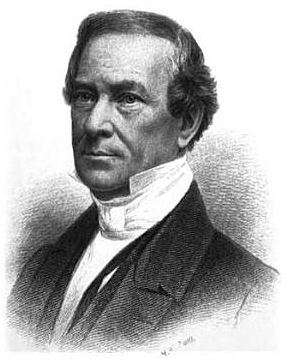
Nathaniel Langdon Frothingham (pastor 1815–1850)

=== Marlborough St. (1868–present) ===
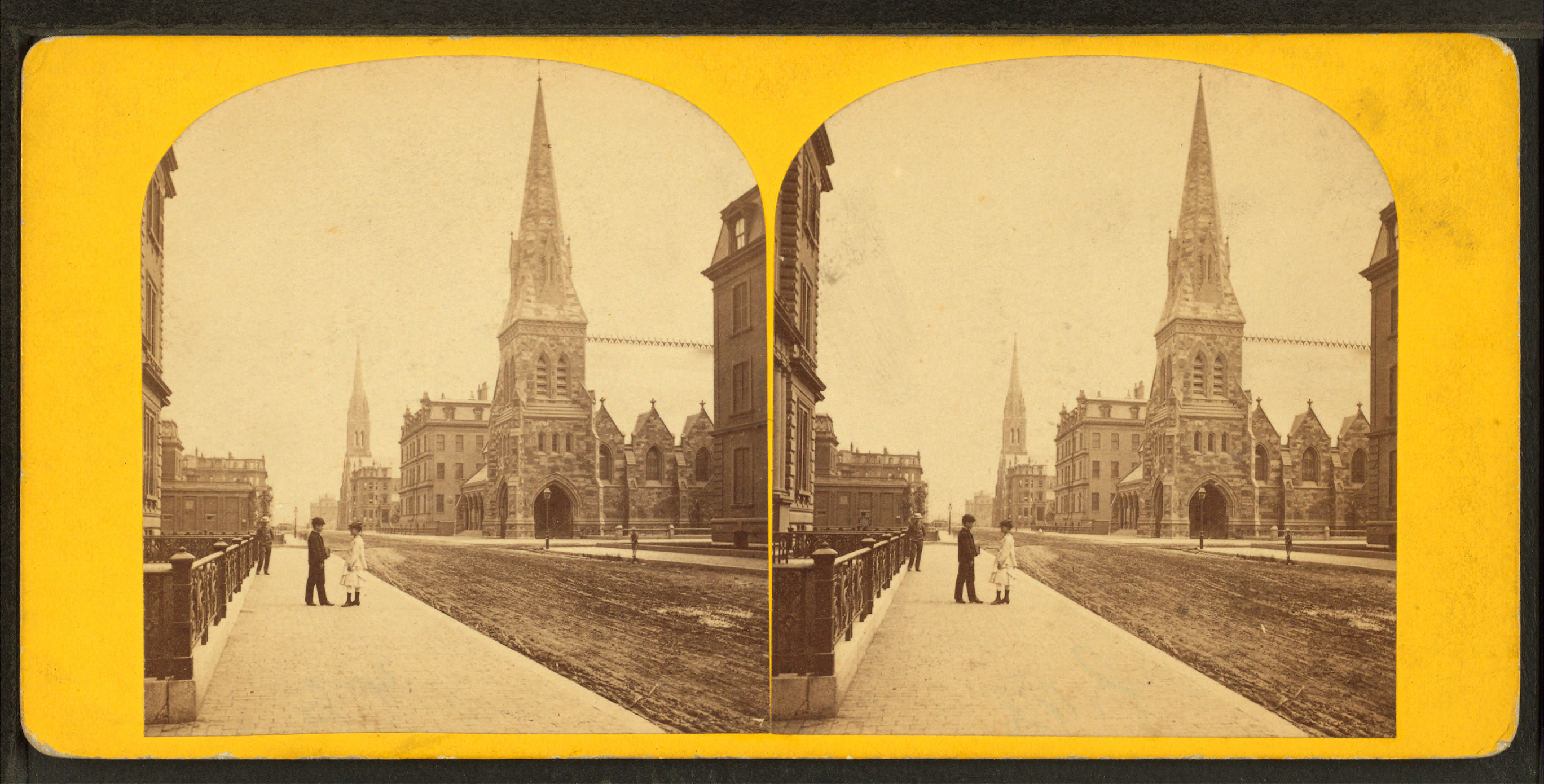
19th century

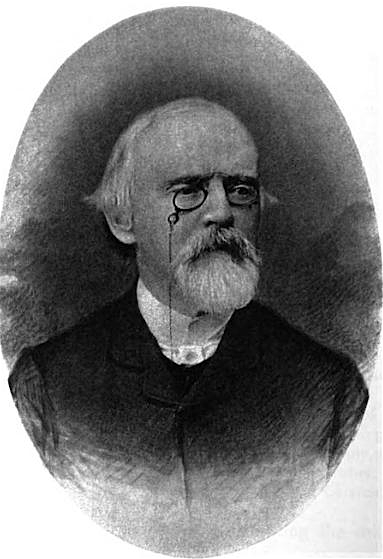
Rufus Ellis (pastor 1853 – c. 1885)

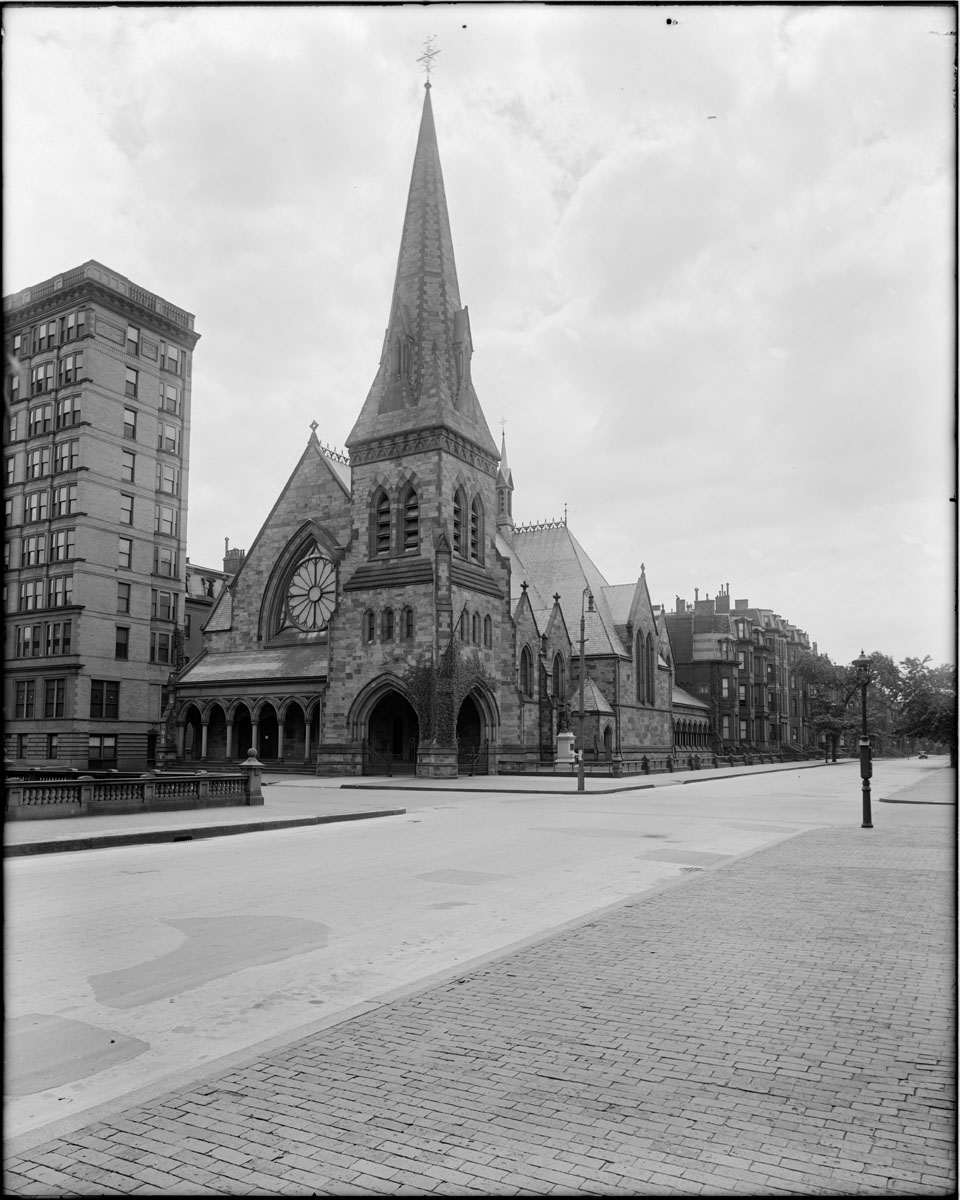
Marlborough St. and Berkeley St., 1920

== See also ==
- Second Church, Boston
- Oldest churches in the United States
