= Eugene Wu =

Eugene Wu may refer to:

- Eugene Wen-chin Wu (吳文津; 1922–2022), former director of the Harvard–Yenching Library
- Eugene Wu (Taiwanese businessman) (吳東進; born 1945)
- Eugene Yuanzhi Wu, (吳元之, born 1978), Chinese-American politician and attorney
- Eugene Wu, a character in the comic strip FoxTrot
- Eugene Y. Wu, a former colleague of research professor Lorena S. Beese
