= William Mayhew =

William Mayhew may refer to:

- William Mayhew (politician) (1787–1855), British politician
- William Mayhew (doctor) (1821–1905), doctor in Toodyay, Western Australia
- William Mayhew (died 1559), English politician, Great Yarmouth borough, 1554
- William Mayhew (librarian), librarian of the Harvard Library
