= Thomas Foxcroft =

Thomas Foxcroft may refer to:

- Thomas Foxcroft (minister)
- Thomas Foxcroft (slave trader)
