= Redford Webster =

American politician

Redford Webster (June 18, 1761 – August 31, 1833) was an apothecary, town official, and state legislator in Boston, Massachusetts. He was a founding member of the American Antiquarian Society, and helped establish the Boston Library Society, and the Massachusetts Historical Society. He was born in Salisbury, Massachusetts, in 1761 to Hannah Wainwright and shopkeeper Grant Webster. In Boston ca. 1787-1805 he worked as "druggist, medicine," from offices "three doors below the Drawbridge, Ann Street." He had trained "with Mr. Daniel Scott, a druggist or apothecary, at the sign of the Leopard, at the south part of the town, the business being subsequently removed to Union Street. On the death of Mr. Scott, young Webster formed a c-opartnership with his widow, under the firm-name of Scott & Webster, and afterward pursued the business in his own name."

From 1792 Webster was active in the Massachusetts Historical Society, serving as one of the founding incorporators in 1794, and Cabinet-Keeper 1810-1833. He was treasurer and trustee of the Boston Library Society 1792-1829. In 1810 he was elected a Fellow of the American Academy of Arts and Sciences. He served as a Boston town official in the capacity of Overseer of the Poor ca.1810-ca.1821. Along with 27 others, he incorporated the American Antiquarian Society in 1812. Webster represented Boston in the Massachusetts General Court, 1831-1832.

Around 1830, Chester Harding painted a portrait of Webster, now in the collection of the Massachusetts Historical Society. In 1787 he married Hannah White; children included the notorious John White Webster (1793–1850).

== Legacy ==
"The town of Redford, in Clinton County, in the north-east corner of the State of New York, was named for him."

== Works ==
- Committee on the Subject of Pauperism and a House of Industry (1821). Report of the Committee on the Subject of Pauperism and a House of Industry in the town of Boston.
- Selections from the Chronicle of Boston and from the Book of Retrospections & Anticipations. 1822.
