= John Bailey (minister) =

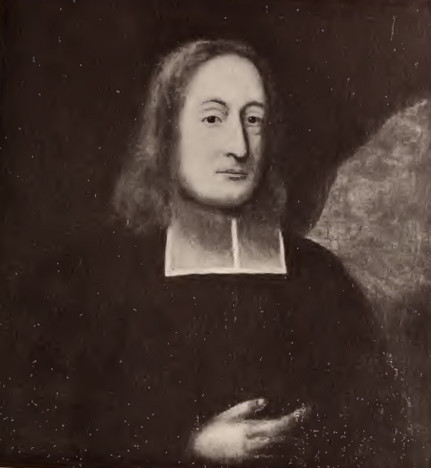
- portrait by unknown artist owned by the Massachusetts Historical Society
- Born: 24 February 1644; Blackburn
- Died: 12 December 1697 (aged 53); Boston
- Occupation: Minister

John Bailey or Baily (1644–1697) was an English dissenting minister, later in life in New England.

== Early life ==
Bailey was, according to Cotton Mather, who preached his funeral sermon, born near Blackburn in Lancashire on 24 February 1644. He was the son of Thomas Bailey, member of the congregation of the Rev. Thomas Jolly at Altham, and later at Wymond House. Probably the former was the birthplace. Both are near Blackburn (Lancashire). His father was dissolute but his wife was pious. By his twelfth year John conducted family worship.

He attended at first the Queen Elizabeth grammar school of Blackburn. The master was then Charles Sagar. Later he was placed under the theological tuition of the Rev. Dr. Thomas Harrison, nonconformist minister at Chester. He began to preach in his twenty-second year, but was not ordained until 1670. Being an Independent or congregationalist, he was exposed to malicious reports. He was arrested and imprisoned in Lancaster gaol for nonconformity.

== In Ireland ==
He moved to Ireland, being in Dublin temporarily, and moving on to Limerick. There he had as a regular hearer a member of the ducal family of Ormond; the Protestant Bishop of Limerick lodged a complaint with James Butler, Duke of Ormonde, the Lord Lieutenant of Ireland. The duke's friend did not abandon Bailey, but so represented his case and worth that Ormond made offer first of a deanery, and then of the first bishopric that fell vacant, if Mr. Bailey would conform. But the bribe was declined without a moment's hesitation. He was again imprisoned in the public gaol. Petitions were presented to the judges at the court of assize in his behalf, but in vain. When arraigned, he dared to address the bench thus: 'If I had been drinking, gaming and carousing at a tavern, with company, my lords, I presume that I would not have procured my being thus treated as an offender. Must prayers to God and preaching Christ with a company of Christians who are peaceable, inoffensive, and serviceable to his majesty and the government, as any of his subjects — must this be considered a greater crime?' The recorder answered, 'We will have you know that it is a greater crime.' At length intimation was secretly sent him that he would be allowed out on condition that within a limited specified time he left the country. To this he reluctantly and sorrowfully agreed. He was not allowed to meet his flock or preach a farewell sermon. In the place of the sermon Bailey printed a letter-address.

== In New England ==
He emigrated to New England in 1683; and his name occurs in church matters there in 1684. He arrived first of all in Boston, and in 1684 was appointed assistant to Samuel Willard of the old South church. Early in 1685 he was in correspondence with the Independent congregation at Watertown, Connecticut, with the result that on 6 October 1686 he succeeded the Rev. John Sherman at Watertown. Judge Samuel Sewall's Diary records that Bailey, holding to the validity of his original ordination, refused to be inducted with the laying on of hands — an innovation in Independent church ways that was something of a scandal for the moment.

Within a month or so of his move to Watertown, a younger brother, Thomas, was appointed his assistant, but Thomas died 21 January 1689 and another assistant was appointed. In 1692, he resigned his charge at Watertown, and returned to Boston. In 1693 he accepted the post of assistant-pastor to the Rev. Mr. Allen, of the First Church in Boston.

== Death ==
He died on Sunday, 12 December 1697, and Cotton Mather preached his funeral sermon, which was published. He chose for its text the words 'Into Thy hands I commit my spirit,' on which Mr. Bailey had prepared a sermon — never delivered — under a presentiment that it would be his last.

== Works ==
A short book by him was published by friends, 'Man's Chief End to Glorify God, or Some Brief Sermon-notes on 1 Corinthians x. 31;' to which is added his letter-address to his 'dearly beloved Christian friends in and about Limerick,' 1689. A portrait of him (in oils) was in the possession of the Massachusetts Historical Society, in whose archives were also some manuscripts of his brother Thomas.

== Family ==
He had married in England a lady whose Christian name was Lydia. She died at Watertown, 12 April 1690. They had no children. His second wife was named Susannah, by whom he had female issue — still represented in New England. His widow married after his death the Rev. Peter Thatcher.

He had another brother named Henry living at Manchester in 1688, where his mother was also still living.
