= James Winthrop =

American lawyer and librarian (1752–1821)

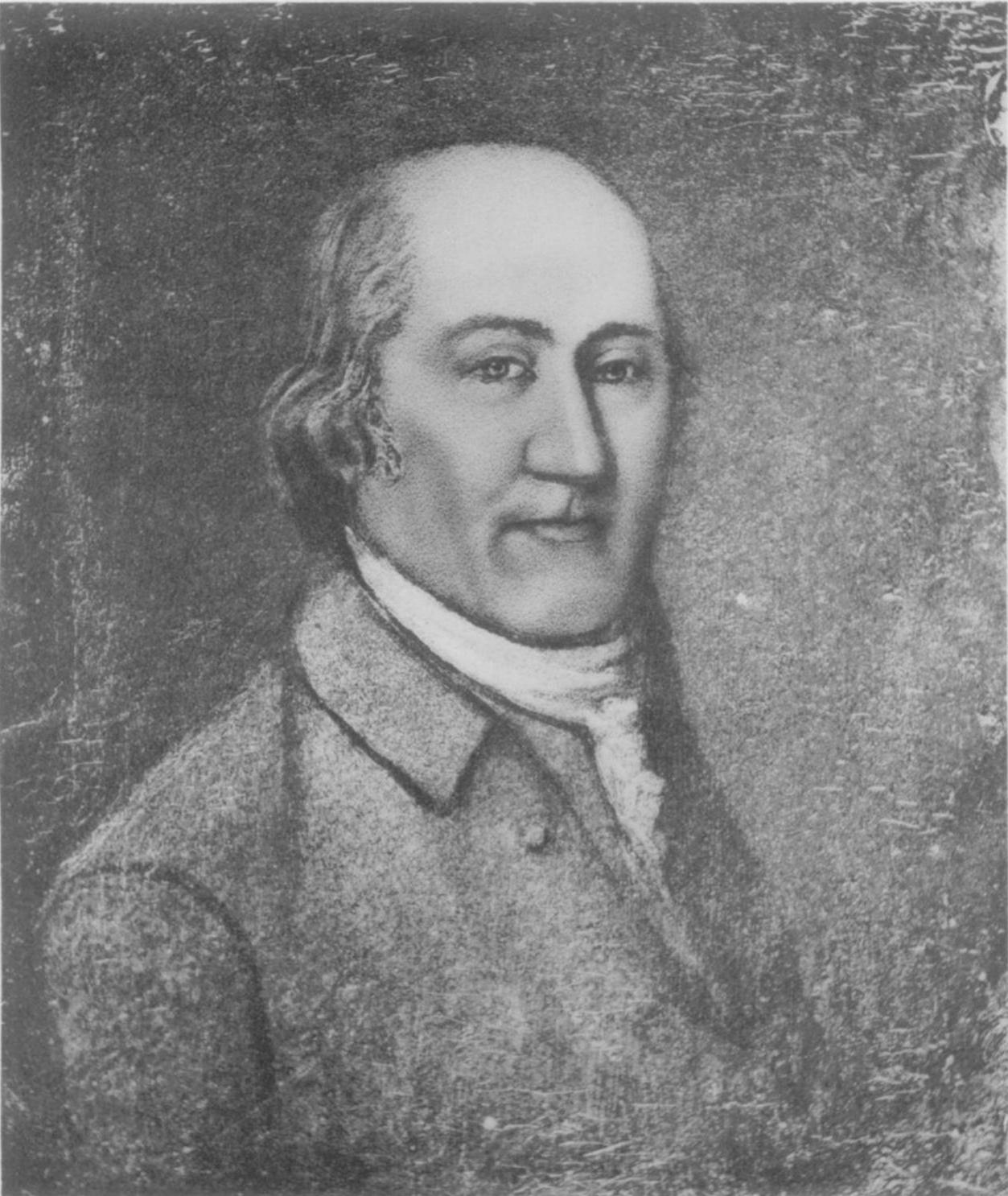
- Born: May 28, 1752; Cambridge
- Died: September 26, 1821 (aged 69); Cambridge
- Alma mater: Harvard University
- Occupation: Librarian; judge; justice of the peace; soldier
- Awards: Fellow of the American Academy of Arts and Sciences (1780–)

Signature
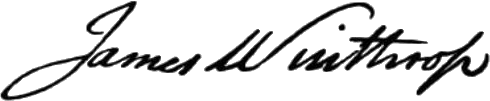

James Winthrop (March 28, 1752 – September 26, 1821) was an American librarian and jurist. Winthrop was the son of physicist John Winthrop. He was wounded at the Battle of Bunker Hill. He was librarian of Harvard from 1772 until 1787.

== Biography ==
James Winthrop was the son of physicist John Winthrop, Hollis professor of mathematics and natural philosophy, and his first wife Rebecca Townsend. His mother died when he was quite young.

He graduated from Harvard College in 1769 and received a master's degree in 1772. He became Librarian of Harvard College and held that office nearly twice as long as that of any of his predecessors. From the vote by which the Library was given to his care, May 1, 1772, we learn that he had acted as substitute for William Mayhew for over two years. He did not, however, sign the formal agreement as Librarian until the following December. His salary was fixed at £60 per annum. The next year he issued the second printed catalogue of the Library under the following title: Catalogus Librorum in Bibliotheca Cantabrigiensi selectus, frequentiorem in usum Harvardinatum qui Gradu Baccalaurei in Artibus nondum sunt donati. Bostoniae : Nov. Ang. Typis Edes & Gill. MDCCLXXIII. This catalogue of twenty-seven pages is an alphabetical list containing perhaps about a thousand titles. It aims to omit books "supra Captum Juniorum Studentium," and, in general, books in foreign languages (excepting the classics) and medical and legal works.

Two years later, when the College buildings were occupied by the Continental Army during the American Revolutionary War, it became necessary to remove the Library to a place of safety. The Provincial Congress voted, June 15, 1775, "that the Library apparatus and other valuables of Harvard College be removed as soon as may be to the town of Andover, that Mr. Samuel Phillips, Mr. Daniel Hopkins, and Dummer Jewett Esq. be a committee to consult with the Revd. the President, the Honble Mr. Winthrop', and the Librarian or such of them as may be conveniently obtained and with them to engage some suitable Person or persons in said town to transport, receive and take the charge of the above mentioned effects, that said Committee join with other gentlemen in employing proper persons in packing said Library apparatus and such other articles as they shall judge expedient and take all due care that it be done with the greatest safety and despatch." The work of removal was begun at once. On the 17th, Samuel Phillips Jr., wrote " Amid all the terrors of battle I was so busily engaged in Harvard Library that I never even heard of the engagement (I mean the siege) until it was completed." While the books were being thus packed up, Winthrop, who was an ardent patriot, was taking part in the Battle of Bunker Hill, where he received a wound in the neck. Among the receipts for moving the books is one " for carting one load of Books ... to the house of George Abbot, Esq. in Andover, 17 miles, £0.17," signed by John L. Abbot, the father of the Librarian of the same name. A subsequent vote of the Congress authorized the removal of some of the books to such other places besides Andover as might seem best. Many books had thus been taken to Concord, and there it was decided the following fall to open the College. The authority of the Provincial Congress for this and for the removal of the books to that town from Andover was obtained, and the Corporation voted, October 24, 1775, that the boxes of books be opened there for the use of the students "as soon as the Librarian can remove to Concord & attend to the duties of his office." Although by the following June, the students had returned to Cambridge, it was May 1778, before the whole of the Library was restored to the College halls.

In the spring of 1775, Winthrop had been appointed postmaster at Cambridge; but after six weeks he felt obliged to resign. In a letter (July 5, 1775) to the president of the Provincial Congress, he says : "As the office will not furnish the single article of victuals, as the establishment is at present, I shall be constrained to quit the place of business and seek for a sustenance somewhere else. All the money I have received since the oath was administered on the 25th of May, amounts to £7.7s.10d.; 15 per cent, of it is my pay for six weeks, that is at [the rate] of 6 1/4d. a day nearly. Judge then, sir, whether this be sufficient to furnish one, who has no other support, with a sustenance."

At this time, Harvard's finances were at the lowest ebb, partly on account of the hard times occasioned by the war, and partly because the Treasurer, John Hancock, was too engrossed in public affairs to attend to the business of the College. Winthrop, for these reasons, was probably receiving no salary. In September, he was appointed Register of Probate, an office he held for forty-two years. Indeed, it was this position that led to his resignation from the Library in 1787; for the Harvard Corporation had passed a law (aimed directly at him) that no officer of the College should hold any civil or judicial office. He was a candidate for Massachusetts's 3rd congressional district in 1788.

He was appointed a justice of the court of common pleas in 1791, and served in that position until 1805. Winthrop died unmarried, September 26, 1821. By his will, he left his library to the then recently established Allegheny College, which a few years before had granted him an LL.D.

James Winthrop was a scholar of ability both in science and languages. He was a charter member of the American Academy of Arts and Sciences in 1780 and contributed a number of mathematical papers to the memoirs of the Academy. After his father's death he was a candidate for the Hollis professorship of mathematics. He later became interested in theology especially in prophecies and chronology, and on these topics he published a number of pamphlets. He was one of the original members of the Massachusetts Historical Society, but, although he took great interest in the society and was seldom absent from the meetings, does not appear to have contributed much to their publications. In 1809, Winthrop was elected a member of the American Philosophical Society in Philadelphia.

== Works ==
- Attempt to translate the Prophetic Part of the Apocalypse of St. John into Familiar Language (Boston, 1794)
- Systematic Arrangement of Several Scripture Prophecies relating to Antichrist (1795)
- Attempt to arrange, in the Order of Time, Scripture Prophecies yet to be Fulfilled (Cambridge, 1803)

He also made scientific and literary contributions to current literature. He was the speculated author of the Letters of Agrippa (November 1787 – January 1788), which appeared in the Massachusetts Gazette.
