= Harvard–Yenching Library =

Library at Harvard University

Coordinates: 42°22′38.85″N 71°06′51.32″W

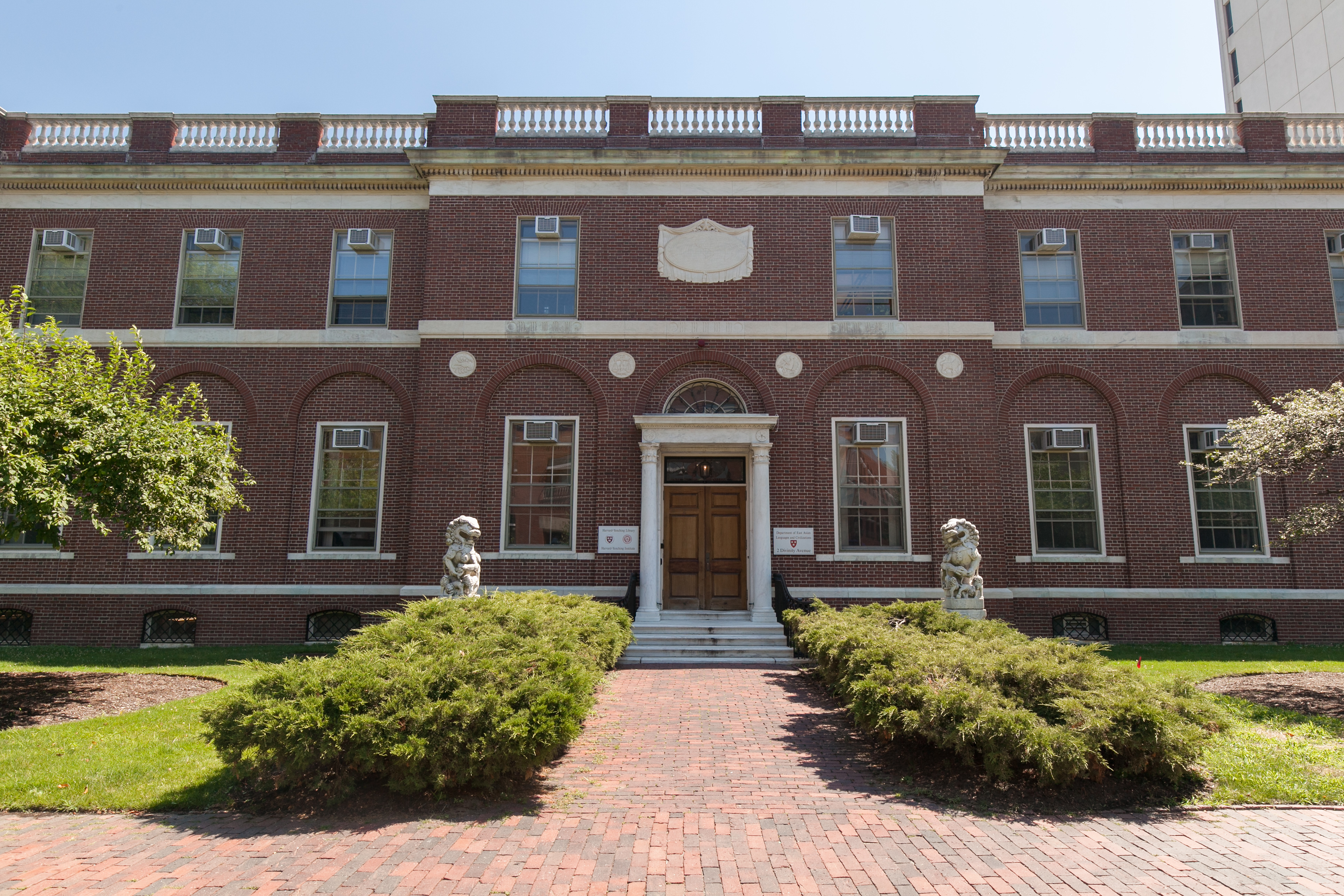
- Harvard-Yenching Library exterior
- Location: 2 Divinity Ave., Cambridge, Massachusetts, United States
- Type: Academic
- Established: 1928
- Branch of: Harvard Library

Collection
- Items collected: Materials in East Asian studies
- Size: 1.5 million volumes

Access and use
- Access requirements: Harvard ID required

Other information
- Website: Harvard-Yenching Library

Harvard–Yenching Library

Chinese name
- Traditional Chinese: 哈佛燕京圖書館
- Simplified Chinese: 哈佛燕京图书馆
Transcriptions
Standard Mandarin
- Bopomofo: ㄏㄚ ㄈㄛˊ ㄧㄢ ㄐㄧㄥ ㄊㄨˊ ㄕㄨ ㄍㄨㄢˇ
- Gwoyeu Romatzyh: Hafor Ianjing Twushugoan
- Wade–Giles: Ha^{1}-fo^{2} Yen^{1}-ching^{1} Tʻu^{2}-shu^{1}-kuan^{3}
- Yale Romanization: Hāfwó Yānjīng Túshūgwǎn
- IPA: [xá.fwǒ jɛ́n.tɕíŋ tʰǔ.ʂú.kwàn]
Yue: Cantonese
- Yale Romanization: Hā-faht Yingīng Tòuhsyūgún or Hā-faht Yīngīng Tòuhsyūgún
- Jyutping: Haa1fat6 Jin3ging1 Tou4syu1gun2 or Haa1fat6 Jin1ging1 Tou4syu1gun2

Japanese name
- Kanji: ハーバード燕京図書館
Transcriptions
- Romanization: Hābādo-Yenchin toshokan

The Harvard–Yenching Library is the primary location for East Asia-related collections at Harvard Library at Harvard University. In addition to East Asian languages (Chinese, Japanese, Korean, Tibetan, Manchu, and Mongolian), it houses collections in European languages and Southeast Asian language (Vietnamese). Totaling more than 1.5 million volumes, the Harvard–Yenching Library has one of the largest collections in East Asian studies outside of Asia.

The library has been located at 2 Divinity Avenue on the Cambridge campus of Harvard University since around 1957. The building was originally built in 1929 for Harvard's Institute of Geographical Exploration, and currently houses part of the Harvard-Yenching Institute and the Department of East Asian Languages and Civilizations, in addition to the Harvard–Yenching Library.

== History ==
=== 19th century ===
In 1879, Ko K'un-hua (Chinese: 戈鯤化), a scholar from China, was engaged to teach the first course in the Chinese language offered at Harvard University. The small collection of books that was purchased for this course became Harvard College Library's first acquisitions in any East Asian language.

=== 20th century ===
In 1914, two Japanese professors (Masaharu Anesaki and Unokichi Hattori from om Tokyo Imperial University to lecture at Harvard. They donated several important sets of Japanese publications on Sinology and Buddhism to the Harvard College Library, thus launching Harvard's Japanese collection. In 1927, Archibald Cary Coolidge, head of Harvard's libraries, asked Alfred Kaiming Chiu, then a graduate student at Harvard, to organize and catalog these collections. The library was formally founded in 1928, as the Chinese-Japanese Library of the Harvard-Yenching Institute.

Following World War II, the library began collecting more social science publications. The once predominantly humanistic collection evolved into a research library that encompasses East Asian materials in all academic disciplines. A. Kaiming Chiu served as head librarian of the library until his retirement in 1964, after which he was succeeded by Eugene W. Wu.

In 1951, a Korean collection was added. In 1965, the Chinese-Japanese Library of the Harvard-Yenching Institute was renamed the Harvard–Yenching Library to reflect the expanded nature of the library's collections. The Library eventually added Tibetan, Mongolian and Manchu publications, and Western language monographs and journals.

In 1973, a Vietnamese collection was added. In 1976, management of the library shifted from the independent Harvard-Yenching Institute to the Harvard College Library.

In 1998, Eugene Wu retired and was succeeded by James Cheng.

=== 21st century ===
In 2003, the library celebrated its 75th anniversary with a symposium and the publication of a volume of scholarly articles on the history of the Library and its collections. In 2009, the library announced a six-year, multimillion-dollar project to digitize major sections of its rare books collection in cooperation with the National Library of China.

In 2020, James Cheng retired. During his time as head librarian, he oversaw large-scale digitization of the library's rare and special collections. James Cheng was succeeded by Jidong Yang in August 2022.
