= Ge Kunhua =

Chinese scholar-official and educator at Harvard University (1838–1882)

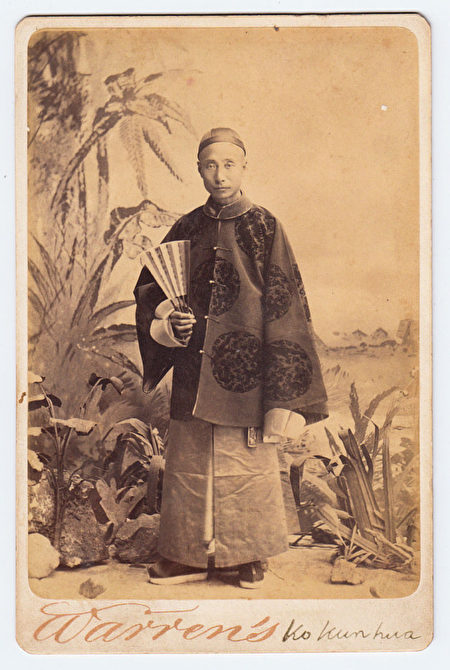
- Born: 1838; Huizhou, Anhui Province, China
- Died: February 14, 1882 (aged 43–44); Cambridge, Massachusetts, U.S.
- Occupations: Scholar-official, educator
- Employer: Harvard University

Ge Kunhua (1838–1882), also known as Ko K’un-hua (Chinese: 戈鯤化), was a Chinese scholar-official and the first instructor of Mandarin Chinese to teach at Harvard University in the United States, from September 1879 until his death in February 1882.

== Life and career ==
Ge Kunhua was a Chinese scholar-official from Ningbo and, from his own account, a native of Huizhou in Anhui Province. While he had purchased his civil service rank (fifth in the rank of the nine official degrees) rather than passing the imperial examinations, he commanded the respect of Westerners, including Edward Bangs Drew, a Harvard alumnus and senior official with the Chinese Maritime Customs Service, and Francis Parkman Knight, a successful Boston merchant and future U.S. consul in China.

Hearing that Harvard president Charles William Eliot was seeking a Chinese scholar to educate Harvard students wishing to work in the lucrative trade in Chinese goods, Drew recommended Kunhua for the position, and Knight successfully advocated for his hire. Kunhua spoke little English, but he had clerked for a Chinese military official and spent five years working for the British embassy and two more for the American consulate in Shanghai. He had successfully tutored Westerners in Mandarin Chinese and evinced curiosity and open-mindedness about Western customs and technology. According to Drew, he had offended Shanghai imperial officials, who suspected him of using the local press to criticize their conduct. The threat of prosecution may have an additional motive for Kunhua's willingness to travel to America to teach. He accepted Harvard's offer of a three-year contract commencing in September 1879, with a monthly salary of $200.

Kunhua arrived in Boston with his wife and five children, along with a maidservant, on September 1, 1879. During his first year, his only student was Latin professor George Martin Lane, who befriended Kunhua and taught him English. While teaching, Kunhua always wore the official robes of the Qing dynasty. He penned elegant poetry in Chinese and English (translated with the help of his young son), and his beautiful calligraphy gained widespread admiration. In just under three years at Harvard, Kunhua taught only five students, but he impressed Bostonians with his warmth and dignity (and verse).

Kunhua contracted pneumonia and died ten days later in Cambridge, Massachusetts, in February 1882. On February 16, Harvard held a memorial service in Appleton Chapel, which President Eliot and other dignitaries attended. Harvard paid for Kunhua's remains and his family members to be returned to China, and Knight and Drew raised $5,000 to educate his sons and offset his family's living expenses back in China. Drew later arranged to enroll the children at the American-run St. John's University, Shanghai.

== Legacy ==
Kunhua was the first Chinese faculty member and first instructor of Mandarin Chinese at Harvard and possibly the first Chinese instructor at an American higher education institution. The books he brought with him were Harvard's first in any Asian language and formed the nucleus of the Harvard–Yenching Library's collection, one of the largest East Asian library collections outside of Asia. Citing Kunhua's popularity with the numerous American scholars, merchants, and literati who met him, Professor Xu Guoqi has observed, "His success was unique in an era when widespread anti-Chinese sentiment in the United States had soured Sino-American relations." After Kunhua's death, it took 40 years for the Chinese language to reenter Harvard's curriculum.
