= Nathan Webb (Massachusetts legislator) =

American politician (1767–1853)

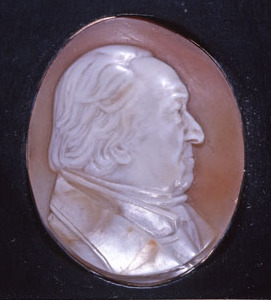
- cameo by Peter Stephenson
- Born: 1767
- Died: 1853 (aged 85–86)
- Occupation: Politician, merchant, teacher
- Position held: member of the Massachusetts House of Representatives

Nathan Webb (April 7, 1767 – February 25, 1853) was a teacher, firefighter, and public official in Boston, Massachusetts, in the late 18th and early 19th centuries. He arrived in Boston from Windham, Connecticut around 1783, when he was 16 years old. In 1783, he began work as a teaching assistant (or "Usher") at the North Writing School, a public school under the direction of schoolmaster John Tileston, on Love Lane (later Tileston Street) in the North End. Webb continued teaching through 1789. According to his diary (1788–1791), in his young adult years he was active in the Independent Musical Club, a private music club with both male and female members founded in 1789. When George Washington visited Boston in 1789, Webb attended the parade that took place by the triumphal arch on Washington Street.

He belonged to the New North congregation when it was overseen by John Eliot. Around 1792 he was founding member of the Massachusetts Charitable Fire Society and remained active for some years. He served as a Fireward in 1810. He was secretary of the Boston Library Society 1794–1826. He served in the Massachusetts House of Representatives, 1810–1812. He was also a Selectman of Boston (1809–1814), as well as an Assessor (1822–1826). In his role as a city official, for instance, he was appointed an agent for Boston in the matter of the estate of Thomas Boylston; others on the committee were James T. Austin, Samuel Swett, Stephen Codman, and Arnold Welles. In 1814, he was a manager of the Boston Asylum for Indigent Boys. He was also a member of the Humane Society of the Commonwealth of Massachusetts.

Webb married Sally Leach on July 16, 1794; they had 6 children: Nathan Webb (1796–1797); Sally Webb (b.1798; married Hawkes Lincoln); Lydia Webb (1801–1827; married Charles Forster); Mary Hewit Webb (b. 1802); Louisa Webb (b. 1804; married Jacob Forster); Caroline Matilda Webb (b. 1812; married Edwin Forster Adams). He moved to Charlestown, Massachusetts, in 1827, into the former house of Francis Hyde. He lived there until his death on February 25, 1853. A miniature ivory portrait of Webb is in the collection of the Museum of Fine Arts, Boston.
