= Isaac Smith (priest) =

Anglican priest

Isaac Smith was an Anglican priest in Ireland during the 17th century.

Smith was educated at Trinity College, Dublin. He was Archdeacon of Killala from 1673 until 1685.
