= Boston Library Society =

Coordinates: 42°21′19.57″N 71°3′28.89″W

Boston Social Library, Tontine Crescent, Franklin Place

The Boston Library Society was an American subscription library established in New England's pre-eminent city, Boston, during 1792. Early subscribers included Revolutionary War figures Paul Revere and William Tudor. The society existed until 1939 when it merged into a larger historical library known as the Boston Athenæum.It has been maintained as an institution within the Athenaeum and conducts short Annual Meetings, within he Athenaeum's Annual meetings.It was founded fifteen years before the atheneum.

== Brief history ==
=== 1792–1858 ===
The Boston Library "circulated polite general reading for ladies and gentlemen". It operated from rooms in the newly built Tontine Crescent, designed by Charles Bulfinch, who also served as one of the library's trustees.

Early subscribers, in addition to Revere and Tudor, included: Hannah Barrell, James Bowdoin III, Dr. Thomas Bulfinch, Rev. John Clarke of First Church, Abigail Howard, Sally Hubbard, Deborah Jeffries, Mary Langdon, Jedidiah Morse, Sarah Wentworth Apthorp Morton, James Perkins and Thomas Handasyd Perkins. The library maintained detailed records of its holdings and circulation activities. For instance, in 1794, Paul Revere borrowed works by Chevalier de Jean Francois Bourgoanne, Elizabeth Inchbald, James Cook, William Coxe, Elizabeth Craven, Charles-Marguerite-Jean-Baptiste Mercier Dupaty, Edward Gibbon, Alexander Jardine, Johann Kaspar Lavater, William Shakespeare, Joshua Townshend, and Comte de Volney.

In the first years of the library, Nathan Webb served as secretary, 1794–1826. Henderson Inches, Allan Pollock, William Walter and Charles Hammatt were successive treasurers. Librarians included Caleb Bingham (1792–1797), Nathan Davies (1797–1803), Cyrus Perkins (1803–1806), James Day (1809–1811), Charles Callender (1813–1828), John Lee (1828–1840) and George S. Bulfinch (1840–ca.1845). Numerous trustees, in addition to Charles Bulfinch, supported the library through the years, including Reverend Joseph Eckley of Old South Meeting House, Reverend John Eliot, Reverend William Emerson, Samuel Hall, John Thornton Kirkland, George Richards Minot, Bishop Samuel Parker, William Scollay, Lemuel Shaw, William Spooner, Charles Vaughan and Redford Webster. In 1801, Abigail Howard donated some 500 books to the library.

By 1848, the library owned "about 11,000 volumes, which have been obtained chiefly by purchase".

Some of the titles in the library's collection in 1824 included:

- Marquis d'Argens' The Jewish Spy
- Asiatic Annual Register 1799–1810
- Jane Austen's Emma
- Babbler periodical essays
- Joanna Baillie's plays
- Henry Baker on Microscopes
- Mary Brunton's Emmeline
- Catherine Cuthbertson's Forest of Montalbano
- Dissenter's Magazine 1794–1799
- Dobson's Encyclopedia
- Fontenelle's Plurality of Worlds
- Mary Hays' Female Biography
- Benjamin Jenks' Meditations
- Soame Jenyns' Works
- Stephen Harriman Long's Expedition to the Rocky Mountains
- Lounger, a periodical work
- Lady Luxborough's Letters to Shenstone
- Catharine Macaulay's Letters on Education
- M'Call's History of Georgia
- William James MacNeven's Rambles in Switzerland
- Microcosm, a periodical work
- Philanthrope, a periodical paper
- Mrs. Ross' Physiognomist, a novel
- Rogers' Looker-On, a periodical paper
- Rowe's Lucan's Pharsalia
- Rowe's Present State of Europe, 1824
- Walter Scott's Peveril of the Peak
- Robert Southey's Metrical Tales
- Amos Stoddard's Sketches of Louisiana
- Mrs. West's Loyalists

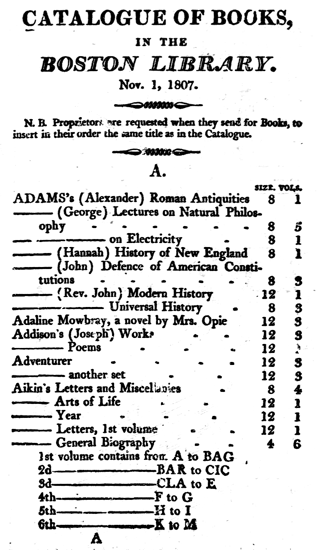
Catalogue of books in the Boston Library, 1807

=== 1858–1939 ===
In 1858, the Tontine Crescent was demolished, and so the Boston Library moved to new quarters in Essex Street. The library moved again in 1870, to Boylston Place; and yet again in 1904, to Newbury Street in the city's Back Bay neighborhood. In 1939 the society merged with the Boston Athenæum.
