= Isaac Smith Jr. =

- Born: May 18, 1749
- Died: September 29/30, 1829; Boston
- Education: Harvard University
- Occupations: Librarian; Minister
- Employer: Harvard Library
- Parents: Isaac Smith, Sr. (father); Elizabeth Storer Smith (mother)

Isaac Smith Jr. (May 18, 1749 – September 29/30, 1829) was an American librarian, minister, and educator.

Smith, the son of the prosperous Boston merchant Isaac Smith Sr. and Elizabeth Storer Smith, was born May 18, 1749. At the age of fourteen he entered Harvard College with the class of 1767. After taking his second degree, and preparing for the ministry, he traveled in Europe for some years. Returning to this country, he was appointed, in 1774, a tutor at Harvard, but the position he was not destined to hold long.

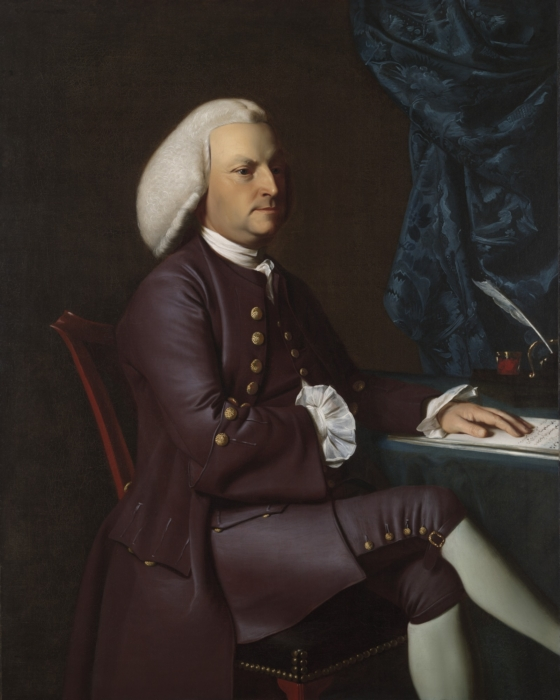
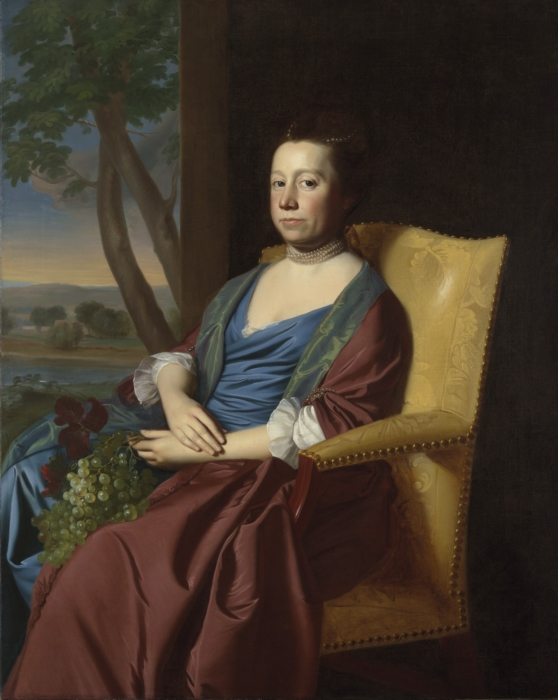
Smith's parents, Isaac Smith Sr. and Elizabeth Storer Smith, painted by John Singleton Copley. They were the aunt and uncle of Abigail (Smith) Adams.

Smith was a firm Loyalist, on April 19, 1775, Lord Percy marched through Cambridge to reinforce the British troops at Lexington and Concord, the young tutor reportedly helped the British commander find the road to Lexington. For this service to the British forces, he was almost ostracized by many residents of Cambridge and was glad to sail for England a month later with other Loyalists

After living a few years in London, he was ordained (June 24, 1778) pastor over a dissenting church in the little town of Sidmouth in Devonshire. The published Journal and letters of his fellow exile, Samuel Curwen, offer insights into his life and parish duties there.

In the spring of 1784, resigning his pastorate, he returned to America. In August 1787, Smith was appointed Librarian of Harvard College, although he did not sign the formal engagement until the next March. In May 1789, the Harvard Corporation allowed him £13.13s. "for instructing the classes in Latin for six weeks and an half in the third term, three times a day, being seven dollars per week." The third printed catalogue of the Library appeared the next year: Catalogus Bibliothecae Harvardianas Cantabrigiae Nov-Anglorum. Bostoniae : Typis Thomas et Johannis Fleet. MDCCXC. The Latin preface says: "Ut ista omnibus, qui ei consulere velint, utilior fieret, libri alphabetice sub diversis capitibus, secundum propria eorum genera, in hoc catalogo disponuntur." The first, or general, part of the catalogue is divided into fifty-four classes in alphabetical order, and the books under each are also alphabetically arranged. About one fourth of the titles are under "Theologia"; yet the names of Shakespeare, Milton, Ben Johnson [sic], Pope, The Tatler, The Spectator, Racine, Rabelais, and Cervantes show that polite literature was not wholly neglected. In the second part of the catalogue, which is devoted to "Tracts," out of 150 pages, theology occupies over 100. In the preparation of this catalogue Smith had the aid of Prof. Stephen Sewall, (Librarian 1762–63) and Hezekiah Packard (class of 1787). The latter was an assistant in the Library; in his memoirs he says: "The next year [1789] I took charge of the Library as an assistant." For his services in preparing this catalogue Smith was allowed by the Corporation in April 1791, the sum of £37.10s. in addition to his regular salary.

In April 1790, the trustees of Dummer Academy, at Byfield, Massachusetts, elected Isaac Smith preceptor of that institution, but it was nearly a year before he entered on his duties there, March 25, 1791. The Academy was not successful under his management; his good nature and easy-going ways were not those of a good teacher or a strict disciplinarian; the school fell off greatly in numbers, and it was not strange that, in April 1809, the trustees accepted his resignation. He removed to Boston where he was appointed chaplain of the Almshouse, a position which he held for many years.

He was never married, and died in Boston on September 29 or 30, 1829, at the age of 80.

One of his scholars, writing years afterward, recalls him as "a short, nice, rubicund, but kindly and scholarly-looking old gentleman." "In spirit" says another writer, "he was mild and tolerant; in creed, broad and liberal." He was "a man of singular purity, gentleness, and piety." Besides the Catalogue mentioned above, his only publication seems to be A sermon preached at Cambridge, May 5th, 1788 on occasion of the death of Mr. Ebenezer Grosvenor, student at Harvard.
