= Thomas Foxcroft (minister) =

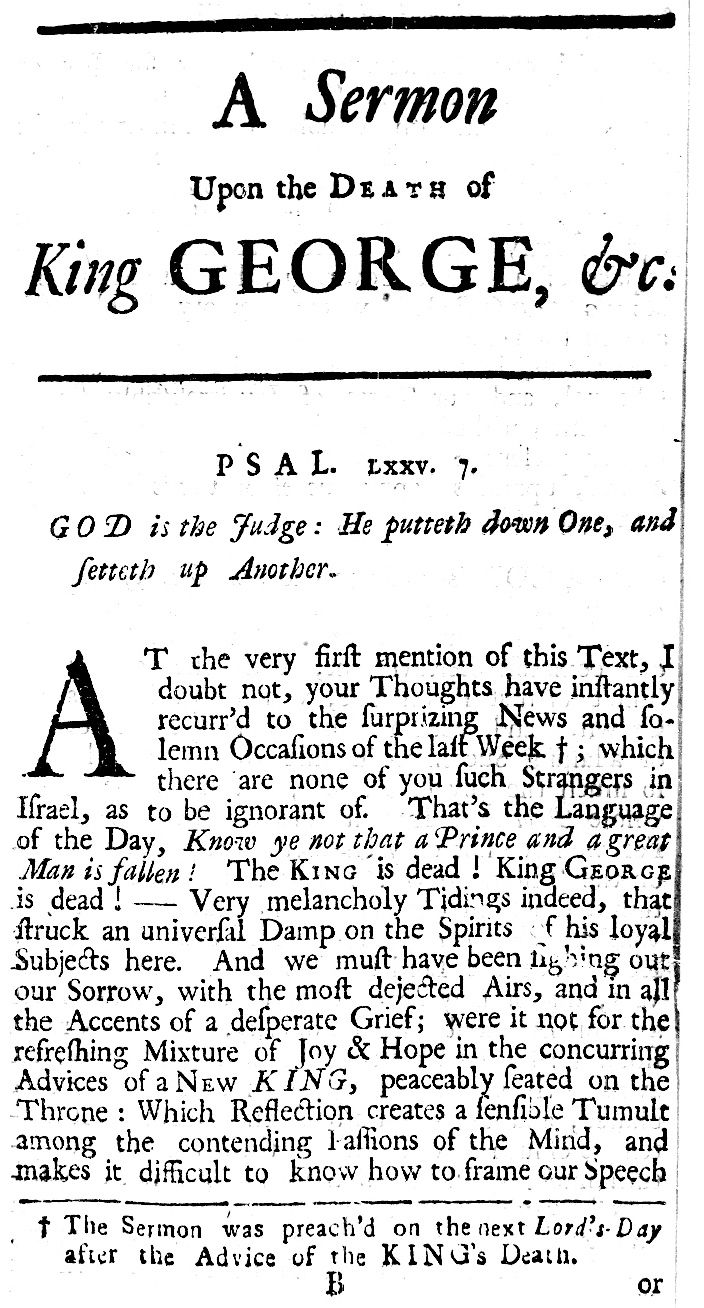
A sermon upon occasion of the death of our late sovereign lord King George, and the accession of His present Majesty, King George II to the British throne. 1727

Thomas Foxcroft (1697–1769) was a minister of the First Church in Boston, Massachusetts in the 18th century.

== Biography ==
Coat of Arms of Thomas Foxcroft

Foxcroft was born on February 26, 1697, in Boston to "Colonel Francis Foxcroft, warden of King's Chapel" and "Elizabeth Danforth, daughter of Governor Danforth." He was educated at Harvard.

He joined the ministry of Boston's First Church in 1717 and remained there for the remainder of his career. "In 1736 Mr. Foxcroft was attacked by paralysis, which left him in an enfeebled condition. He continued to preach until the day of his death, but by no means as effectively as before his illness."

He died in Boston on June 18, 1769. His children included Samuel Foxcroft (died 1807).
