= JHOVE =

Digital object validation software

- Developers: JSTOR, Harvard University Library and Open Preservation Foundation
- Stable release: 1.22 / April 29, 2019; 7 years ago
- Written in: Java
- Operating system: Cross-platform
- License: GNU LGPL
- Website: jhove.openpreservation.org
- Repository: github.com/openpreserve/jhove

JHOVE (JSTOR/Harvard Object Validation Environment) - pronounced "jove" - is a format-specific digital object validation API written in Java. JHOVE was a joint project of JSTOR and the Harvard University Library to develop an extensible framework for format validation. The Open Preservation Foundation took over stewardship of JHOVE in February 2015.

JHOVE is currently available for downloading as version 1.22. It is licensed under the LGPLv2. The download includes both a command line and a GUI version. It is designed so that third parties can attach different "heads" to the software, and so can be integrated with other applications that need to validate files. It can be run on any Unix, Windows, or Macintosh OS X platform which supports Java 1.6.

Currently supported formats are AIFF, ASCII, Bytestream, GIF, HTML, JPEG, JPEG 2000, PDF, TIFF, UTF-8, WAV, and XML. Documents are analyzed and checked for being well-formed (consistent with the basic requirements of the format) and valid (generally signifying internal consistency). JHOVE notes when a file satisfies specific profiles within formats (e.g., PDF/X, HTML 4.0).

A successor called JHOVE2 is currently available; however, it has a completely separate code base, and was last updated in 2014.
