= Isaac E. Smith =

Isaac Edgar Smith
- Born: January 21, 1858; Charleston, Illinois, U.S.
- Died: September 27, 1940 (aged 82); North Creek, New York, U.S.
- Resting place: Nassau Knolls Cemetery, Nassau County, New York
- Other name: Ike Smith
- Occupation: Boat builder
- Spouses: Mary Jane Fearon; Ida Baxter Smith
- Children: 2

Isaac Edgar Smith (January 21, 1858 – September 27, 1940) was an American boat builder based in Port Washington, New York. Isaac, or "Ike" as he was commonly known, was born in Charleston, Illinois to Stephen Baldwin Smith and Mary Elizabeth Smith (née Sobey). His parents were residents of Port Washington, but had traveled to Illinois in 1856, returning to Long Island when Isaac was two years old. His father was a boat builder and owned the business where Isaac Smith spent his apprenticeship upon the conclusion of the American Civil War, in which his father had served as a pilot aboard the steamship "T.V. Arrowsmith".

After completing his apprenticeship, Isaac Smith opened his own boat-building business on Shore Road in Port Washington. It was there that he was to build the first 22 Star Class sailboats during the winter of 1910–11. The Star Class was designed by Francis Sweisguth from an earlier design by William Gardner, at the prompting of George Arthur "Pop" Corry – known today as the "Father of the Stars." The boats originally sold for $240 plus $20 for sails, but due to their high quality they were fetching two–three times that more than 10 years later. Of the original 22 stars, half were purchased by the American Yacht Club of Rye and the rest sold to various clubs on the western end of the sound. Francis Sweisguth (#6) and George Corry (#17) were among the initial owners."A Pictorial History of the Star Class".

Smith continued to build Stars and went on to build over 100 boats during his life. His work continued both through his own business and later through the Sands Point Shipyard, in conjunction with Carl H. Shultz, Martyn Baker, and James P. Ford, until his retirement in 1930. After retiring he continued to make rowboats as a hobby. By the time of his death, Smith's boats were found on both American coasts, in England, Mexico, and Pacific coast of Asia.

Isaac Smith was married to Mary Jane Fearon (April 28, 1893–March 25, 1924) on February 16, 1881, with whom he had one son, William Edgar Smith (September 20, 1882–September 23, 1925) and a daughter Helen E. Smith (July 1888–March 3, 1954). Later he married Ida Baxter, former Postmistress of Port Washington and they were still together when he died at his summer home in North Creek, New York on September 27, 1940, of a heart attack. Surprisingly, Smith himself never set sail despite his long career as a boat builder.

In 2004 a dedication was made to the first 22 Star boats at the site of Smith's original shipyard. The mayor of Port Washington and other local celebrities attended the dedication which saw the mounting of a Starboat keel on the spot, which is now a public park.
