= William Mayhew (librarian) =

- Born: 7 July 1746
- Died: 13 July 1785
- Education: Harvard College

William Mayhew (7 July 1746 – 13 July 1785) was librarian of the Harvard Library from 1769-1772.

Mayhew, the son of Zachariah and Elizabeth Mayhew, was born on Martha's Vineyard, probably in the town of Chilmark, 7 July 1746. Entering Harvard College at the age of seventeen, he graduated in the class of 1767, and before taking his second degree, he began to serve as Librarian. He held this position, at least nominally for three years (1769-1772); for the last two years his successor James Winthrop seems to have acted for him. Returning to Martha's Vineyard, he married Peggy, by whom he had three children.

He was appointed, 23 April 1772, sheriff of Dukes County. About 1783, the town of Hudson, N. Y., was founded by people from Nantucket, Martha's Vineyard, and Providence. William Mayhew was either one of this party of emigrants or soon followed his townspeople to their new home. In 1786, we find him an alderman in the first common council of Hudson. He could not have held this office long, for he died 13 July of that year.

This article incorporates text from The librarians of Harvard College 1667-1877, a publication from 1897, now in the public domain in the United States.
