= Samuel Shapleigh =

American librarian

- Born: July 9, 1765
- Died: April 17, 1800 (aged 34)

Samuel Shapleigh (July 9, 1765 – April 17, 1800) was an American librarian.

Shapleigh was born in Kittery, Maine, on July 9, 1765. His parents died when he was young, and he was twenty before he entered Harvard College with the class of 1789. He taught a while in the Cambridge grammar school, and then studied law, but his poor health prevented him from practicing. In November, 1790, he was chosen Butler and three years later (27 August 1793) Librarian. His salary was fixed at $360, on condition that he or a substitute should "continue in the College during the Summer, Fall and Spring vacations that Company may have access to the Library." He acted as Librarian until his death, on April 17, 1800.

He was buried in Cambridge, where his gravestone identified him as "a virtuous son, faithful librarian, and liberal benefactor of Harvard College". By his will he bequeathed nearly the whole of his property to Harvard, the income to "be sacredly appropriated to the purchase of such modern publications as the Corporation, Professors, and Tutors shall judge most proper to improve the students in polite literature; the books to be deposited in the library of the University, and to consist of poetry and prose, but neither in Greek nor Latin."
