= Eugene Wen-chin Wu =

Chinese librarian and bibliographer (1922–2022)

- Traditional Chinese: 吳文津
- Simplified Chinese: 吴文津
Transcriptions
Standard Mandarin
- Hanyu Pinyin: Wú Wénjīn
- Wade–Giles: Wu2 Wen2-chin1

Eugene Wen-chin Wu (Chinese: 吳文津; Eugene Wu; July 12, 1922, Sichuan, China – August 1, 2022, Menlo Park, California) was a China-born American scholar, bibliographer, and librarian. Wu was a key figure in organizing American Chinese and East Asian libraries, best known as head of the Harvard-Yenching Library from 1965 to 1997. After earning a degree in Library Science from University of Washington, Seattle he developed the Chinese collection at the Hoover Institution at Stanford University. He worked toward a PhD there, but instead became head of the Harvard-Yenching Library, where he stayed until retirement in 1997.

== Early life ==
Wu's father was an official in the Sichuan provincial police and became county magistrate of Xinjin county, near Chengdu, where Wu was born, his family's fifth child. He studied English at the Central University in Chongqing, while the city was subjected to constant bombing during Second Sino-Japanese War. He volunteered to join the army, and became a translator in the Foreign Affairs Bureau. In 1945 the United States Army asked China to send 100 translators to help train American pilots. Wu became the team leader of these 50 translators.

== Career ==
Wu was an English major at the National Central University in Chongqing in wartime China, served as an interpreter between Chinese and American soldiers, and was sent to the United States to help train pilots for the Chinese Air Force. After the end of the war in 1945, he enrolled in the History department of University of Washington. When the university decided to catalogue the one or two thousand Chinese language volumes in their library, Wu became a student assistant. He then went to the Hoover Institution at Stanford. He and Mary Clabaugh Wright worked for several years to assemble documents and publications on the history of the Chinese Communist Party, which became known as the Chen Cheng Collection. He worked toward a PhD there, but in 1965 he succeeded Alfred Kaiming Ch'iu at the Harvard-Yenching Library, becoming its second director. He stayed there until his retirement in 1997.

== Selected publications ==
- Eugene W. Wu, Leaders of Twentieth-Century China : An Annotated Bibliography of Selected Chinese Biographical Works in the Hoover Library. Stanford Calif: Stanford University Press; 1956.
- ___ with Berton Peter, Contemporary China: a Research Guide. Stanford Calif: Hoover Institution on War Revolution and Pace. 1967
- ___, "Recent Developments in Chinese Publishing". The China Quarterly, no. 53, 1973, pp. 134–38. JSTOR 652510.
- ___, The Harvard-Yenching Library and Its Chinese Local Gazetteers Collection and Other Related Materials: A Brief Survey. Harvard University, 1985.
- ___, Introduction, The Secret Speeches of Chairman Mao : From the Hundred Flowers to the Great Leap Forward. Council on East Asian Studies/Harvard University : Distributed by Harvard University Press 1989
- —— (1993). "The Founding of the Harvard-Yenching Library". Journal of East Asian Libraries. 101 (1): 65–69.
- ___, Organizing For East Asian Studies In The United States:The Origins Of The Council On East Asian Libraries, Association For Asian Studies*
- ___, 美國東亞圖書館發展史及其他. (Meiguuo Dongyatushuguan fazhanshi ji qita The history of American Far Eastern Libraries and other things) 聯經出版 Taibei 2016.
