= Giove =

Giove may refer to:

- Giove, Umbria, a town in Italy
- GIOVE, Galileo In-Orbit Validation Element, a series of artificial satellites prototyping a satellite navigation system
- Missy Giove, American racing cyclist
