= Lucien Southard =

American conductor

Lucien Southard (c. 1827 in Sharon, Vermont – 1881 in Augusta, Georgia) was an American conductor, who directed concerts at the Peabody Institute following the tenure of James Monroe Deems. Southard's reign in control of the Institute was not entirely positive, a situation which Southard blamed on the lack of a "proper musical atmosphere" in Baltimore, Maryland. Southard became the first director of the Baltimore Academy of Music. He also published Elements of Thorough Bass and Harmony, in 1865.
