= Massachusetts Historical Society =

American organization based in Boston

- Massachusetts Historical Society Building
- U.S. National Register of Historic Places
- U.S. National Historic Landmark
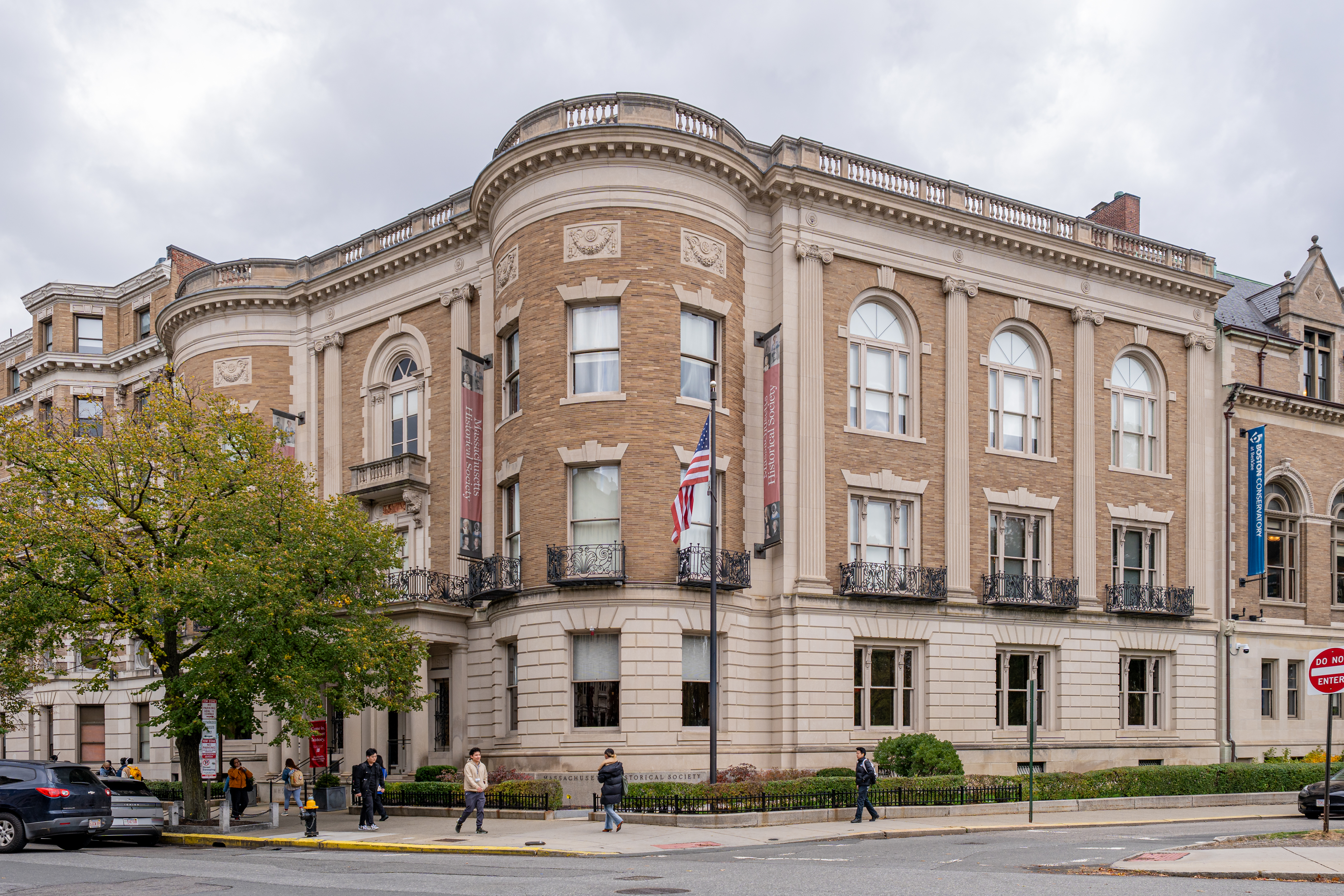

- Location within Massachusetts Location within the United States
- Location: 1154 Boylston Street; Boston, Massachusetts, U.S.
- Coordinates: 42°20′47″N 71°5′26″W
- Built: 1899
- Architect: Edmund M. Wheelwright
- Architectural style: Colonial Revival
- Website: masshist.org
- NRHP reference No.: 66000770

Significant dates
- Added to NRHP: October 15, 1966
- Designated NHL: December 21, 1965

The Massachusetts Historical Society (MHS) is a major historical archive specializing in early American, Massachusetts, and New England history. The Massachusetts Historical Society was established in 1791 and is located at 1154 Boylston Street in Boston, Massachusetts, and is the oldest historical society in the United States.

The society's building was constructed in 1899 and added to the National Register of Historic Places in 1966. In 2016, the Boston Landmarks Commission designated it a Boston Landmark.

== History ==
The society was founded on January 24, 1791, by Reverend Jeremy Belknap to collect, preserve, and document items of American history. He and the nine other founding members donated family papers, books, and artifacts to the society to form its initial collection. Its first manuscript was published in 1792, becoming the first historical society publication in the United States. The society incorporated in 1794; signatories included William Baylies, Jeremy Belknap, Alden Bradford, Peleg Coffin, Manasseh Cutler, John Davis, Daniel Davis, Aaron Dexter, John Eliot, Nathaniel Freeman, James Freeman, Thaddeus Mason Harris, Isaac Lothrop, George Richards Minot, John Mellen Jr., Thomas Pemberton, William Dandridge Peck, John Prince, Ezekiel Price, James Sullivan, David Sewall, Peter Thacher, William Tudor, Samuel Turell, Dudley Atkins Tyng, James Winthrop, Thomas Wallcut, Redford Webster, and William Wetmore. Indeed, the society claims to have been the only historical collection in the United States until establishment of the New-York Historical Society (1804) and the American Antiquarian Society (1812), after which time the society's collecting activities began to focus primarily on Boston and New England. In 1849, Frances Manwaring Caulkins became the first woman elected to the society's membership.

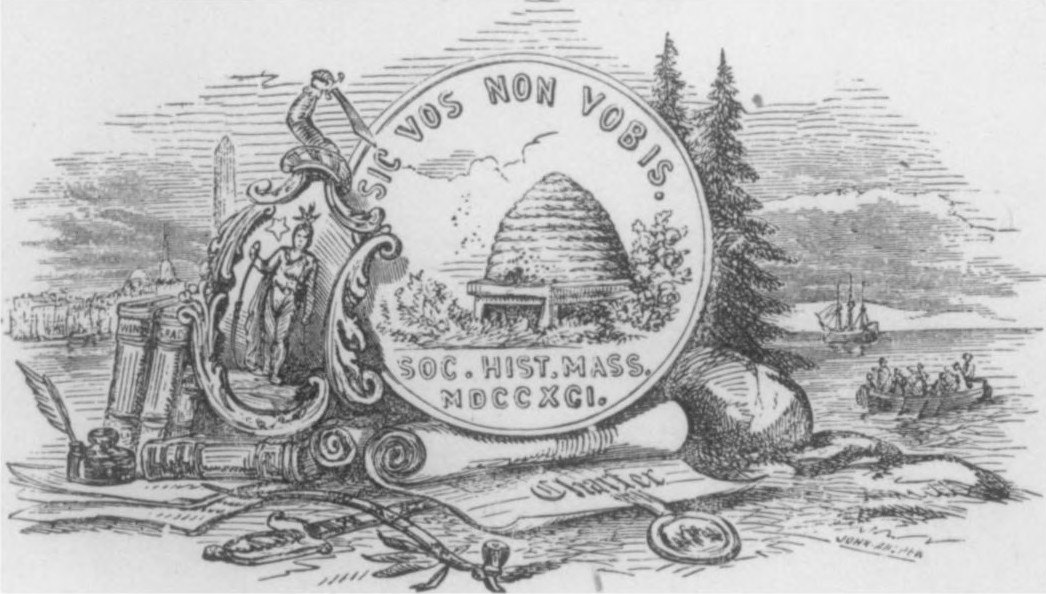
1869 logo of the Massachusetts Historical Society

"The society, for several years after its organization, met in the attic of Faneuil Hall; afterwards rooms were occupied in Hamilton Place, and then in Franklin Street. In 1833 ... quarters on Tremont Street were occupied" in the building of the Provident bank through the 1890s. The society's current building in the Back Bay was built in 1899; it was designated a National Historic Landmark in 1965 in recognition of the society's distinctive contribution to historic preservation.

== Collections ==
Today the society continues to collect, preserve, and communicate historical information about Massachusetts and the United States. It is now organized in five departments: Library, Publications, Education and Public Programs, Research Programs, the Adams Family Papers, and Administration. Major collections include:

- Adams Family Papers (1639–1889) – material relating to President John Adams (1735–1826) and First Lady Abigail Adams (1744–1818), as well as other family members including Charles Francis Adams (1807–1886), President John Quincy Adams (1767–1848), First Lady Louisa Catherine Adams (1775–1852), Charles Francis Adams (1835–1915), and Henry Adams (1838–1918). Among other papers, the collection includes correspondence, diaries, literary manuscripts, speeches, legal and business papers, and John Adams' handwritten copy of the Declaration of Independence.
- Thomas Jefferson – the library holds Jefferson's handwritten copy of the Declaration of Independence and the Coolidge Collection, a collection of "Thomas Jefferson Manuscripts" containing thousands of pages of Jefferson's correspondence, manuscripts of writings, Monticello records including account books and journals, and more than 400 of Jefferson's architectural drawings.
- Other manuscripts and printed texts – approximately 12,000 biographies and more than 10,000 local histories, as well as newspapers and broadsides including John Dunlap's July 4–5, 1776, Philadelphia printing of the Declaration of Independence. Other notable manuscripts include John Winthrop's manuscripts on the early settlement of New England; Paul Revere's account of his ride; and the Francis Parkman manuscripts dealing with French Canada.
- Artwork – paintings by John Singleton Copley (1738–1815), Sarah Goodridge (1788–1853), Chester Harding (1792–1866), Alonzo Hartwell (1805–1873), Samuel Stillman Osgood (1808–1885), John Smibert (1688–1751), and Richard Morrell Staigg (1817–1881), as well as sculptures by Thomas Ball, Richard Saltonstall Greenough, Henry Dexter, and Hiram Powers.

The society continues to produce scholarly books, but now augments these publications with digital editions available through its website and other online resources. The Massachusetts Historical Review has been published annually since 1999.

== Notable fellows ==
The fellows of the Massachusetts Historical Society are elected and serve as the society's legal governing body. Notable fellows include:

- Ben Bagdikian
- Bernard Bailyn
- Lawrence Buell
- Ken Burns
- Robert Caro
- James Carroll
- Jill Ker Conway
- Michael Dukakis
- Joseph Ellis
- Drew Gilpin Faust
- David Hackett Fischer
- Henry Louis Gates Jr.
- Doris Kearns Goodwin
- David D. Hall
- Evelyn Brooks Higginbotham
- Maya Jasanoff
- Justin Kaplan
- Jill Lepore
- David McCullough
- James M. McPherson
- Bill Moyers
- Robert Keating O'Neill
- Deval Patrick
- Jaroslav Pelikan
- Nathaniel Philbrick
- Cokie Roberts
- Larry Ruttman
- Jonathan Sarna
- Merritt Roe Smith
- Richard Norton Smith
- David Souter
- Laurel Thatcher Ulrich
- Garry Wills
- Gordon S. Wood

== See also ==
- American Antiquarian Society – Learned society and national research library
- List of historical societies in Massachusetts
- List of National Historic Landmarks in Boston
- National Register of Historic Places listings in southern Boston, Massachusetts
