= KCAM =

KCAM may refer to:

- KCAM (AM), a radio station (790 AM) licensed to Glennallen, Alaska, United States
- KCAM-FM, a radio station (88.7 FM) licensed to Glennallen, Alaska
