= George Marsden =

American historian (born 1939)

- Born: George Mish Marsden; February 25, 1939 (age 87); Harrisburg, Pennsylvania, U.S.
- Spouse: Lucie Commeret (m. 1969)

Academic background
- Education: Yale University; Westminster Theological Seminary; Haverford College
- Thesis: The New School Presbyterian Mind (1966)
- Doctoral advisor: Sydney E. Ahlstrom

Academic work
- Discipline: History
- Sub-discipline: American history; history of Christianity; intellectual history
- Institutions: Calvin College; Duke University; University of Notre Dame
- Doctoral students: Diana Butler Bass; Matthew Grow; Thomas S. Kidd; Steven Nolt; Rick Ostrander
- Main interests: American evangelicalism
- Notable works: Fundamentalism and American Culture (1980) Jonathan Edwards: A Life (2003)

George Mish Marsden (born February 25, 1939) is an American historian who has written extensively on the interaction between Christianity and American culture, particularly on Christianity in American higher education and on American evangelicalism. He is best known for his award-winning biography of the New England clergyman Jonathan Edwards, a prominent theologian of Colonial America.

== Biography ==
Marsden was born on February 25, 1939, in Harrisburg, Pennsylvania. He attended Haverford College, Westminster Theological Seminary, and Yale University, completing a Doctor of Philosophy degree in American history under Sydney E. Ahlstrom. He taught at Calvin College (1965–1986), Duke Divinity School (1986–1992), and as Francis A. McAnaney Professor of History at the University of Notre Dame (1992–2008). As of 2017 Marsden is Emeritus Professor of History at the University of Notre Dame. His former doctoral students include Diana Butler Bass, Matthew Grow, Thomas S. Kidd, Steven Nolt, and Rick Ostrander.

He was awarded the Bancroft Prize for his book Jonathan Edwards: A Life in 2004, the Merle Curti Award in 2004, and the Grawemeyer Award in Religion in 2005.

A Festschrift was composed in his honor in 2014. It was entitled American Evangelicalism: George Marsden and the State of American Religious History and was edited by Darren Dochuk, Thomas S. Kidd, and Kurt W. Peterson.

== Selected works ==
- The Evangelical Mind and the New School Presbyterian Experience: A Case Study of Thought and Theology in nineteenth-century America. New Haven, Connecticut: Yale University Press. 1970. ISBN 9780300013436.
- Fundamentalism and American Culture: The Shaping of Twentieth-Century Evangelicalism, 1870–1925. New York: Oxford University Press. 1980. ISBN 9780197599488.
- Understanding Fundamentalism and Evangelicalism. Grand Rapids, Michigan: Eerdmans. 1991.
- The Soul of the American University: From Protestant Establishment to Established Nonbelief. New York: Oxford University Press. 1994.
- Reforming Fundamentalism: Fuller Seminary and the New Evangelicalism. Grand Rapids, Michigan: Eerdmans. 1995. ISBN 9780802836427.
- The Outrageous Idea of Christian Scholarship. New York: Oxford University Press. 1997. doi:10.1093/acprof:oso/9780195122909.001.0001. ISBN 978-0-19-512290-9.
- Jonathan Edwards: A Life. New Haven, Connecticut: Yale University Press. 2003. ISBN 9780300096934.
- A Short Life of Jonathan Edwards. Grand Rapids, Michigan: Eerdmans. 2008.
- The Twilight of the American Enlightenment: The 1950s and the Crisis of Liberal Belief. New York: Basic Books. 2014. ISBN 9780465030101.
- C. S. Lewis's Mere Christianity: A Biography. Princeton, New Jersey: Princeton University Press. 2016. ISBN 9780691153735.
- The Soul of the American University Revisited: From Protestant to Postsecular. Oxford University Press. 2021. ISBN 9780190073312.
- An Infinite Fountain of Light: Jonathan Edwards for the Twenty-First Century. IVP Academic. 2023. ISBN 9781514006627.

Awards
| Preceded by James F. Brooks | Bancroft Prize; 2004; With: Edward L. Ayers and Steven Hahn | Succeeded by Melvin Patrick Ely |
| Preceded by Alan Gallay | Bancroft Prize; 2004; With: Edward L. Ayers and Steven Hahn | Succeeded by Michael Klarman |
| Preceded by Alan Gallay | Bancroft Prize; 2004; With: Edward L. Ayers and Steven Hahn | Succeeded by Michael O'Brien |
| Preceded by Helen Lefkowitz Horowitz | Merle Curti Award in Intellectual History; 2004 | Succeeded by Michael O'Brien |
| Preceded by Jonathan Sacks | Grawemeyer Award in Religion; 2005 | Succeeded by Marilynne Robinson |
