= KCAM (AM) =

American radio station serving Alaska

- Glennallen, Alaska; United States
- Broadcast area: Copper River Valley
- Frequency: 790 kHz
- Branding: 790 KCAM

Programming
- Format: Religious
- Affiliations: Fox News Radio; Salem Radio Network

Ownership
- Owner: Joy Media Ministries
- Sister stations: KCAM-FM

History
- First air date: April 16, 1964

Technical information
- Licensing authority: FCC
- Facility ID: 49563
- Class: B
- Power: 5,000 watts
- Transmitter coordinates: 62°6′50.3″N 145°32′14.8″W

Links
- Public license information: Public file; LMS
- Webcast: Listen live
- Website: www.kcam.org

KCAM is a religious formatted broadcast radio station licensed to Glennallen, Alaska, serving Copper River Valley. KCAM is owned and operated by Joy Media Ministries.

== History ==
On April 16, 1964, KCAM signed on the air for the first time just weeks after the 1964 Alaska earthquake. At the time of the station's launch, KCAM was owned by Central Alaska Missions, Inc., which later became a subsidiary of SEND International. From 2011 to 2015, the station was owned and operated by Alaska Bible College.
