= Asian Theological Seminary =

Theological seminary in the Philippines

- Established: 1969
- President: Dr. Melchor C. Go
- Students: 270
- Location: Quezon City, Philippines; 14.635°N 121.039°E
- Website: www.ats.ph

Asian Theological Seminary (ATS) is a theological seminary in Quezon City, Philippines.

Asian Theological Seminary was started in 1969 by Far Eastern Gospel Crusade (now SEND International) missionaries, including Elliot Johnson, now Senior Professor of Bible Exposition at Dallas Theological Seminary, and Charles Sell, retired professor of Trinity Evangelical Divinity School.

Asian Theological Seminary has published the journal Phronesis (ISSN 2012-4066) since 1994.

As of 2025, there had been 1800 master-level graduates from the seminary.

== Accreditation and partnerships ==
ATS is accredited by the Asia Theological Association to offer graduate diplomas in Biblical Languages, Christian Education, Advanced Pastoral Studies, Pastoral Counseling, Intercultural and Urban Studies, Theological Studies, and Transformational Urban Leadership; Master of Arts degrees in Biblical Studies, Christian Education, Pastoral Counseling, Intercultural Ministry, Theology, and Transformational Urban Leadership; and Master of Divinity degrees in Biblical Studies, Christian Education, Pastoral Studies, Counseling, Intercultural and Urban Studies. and Theology.

In 2000 Asian Theological Seminary entered into a coalition with Carey Theological College in Vancouver and the Northwest Graduate School of the Ministry (now Bakke Graduate University) in Seattle to offer a Doctor of Ministry degree in "transformational leadership for the global urban city".

ATS is also part of the Asia Graduate School of Theology, a consortium of evangelical theological seminaries established by the Asia Theological Association in 1984 to enable member seminaries to offer higher degrees.

== Academics ==
=== Programs ===
ATS programs are designed to provide biblical, theological, and ministerial foundations for ministry, with an emphasis on praxis, in order to enable students to integrate theory and practice.

==== Residential programs ====
- Graduate Diplomas: Biblical Languages, Christian Education, Pastoral Counseling, Intercultural and Urban Studies, Advanced Pastoral Studies, Theological Studies, and Transformational Leadership.
- Master of Arts (MA) degrees: Biblical Studies, Christian Education, Pastoral Counseling, Intercultural Ministries, Theology, and Transformational Urban Leadership.
- Master of Divinity (M.Div.) degrees: Biblical Studies, Christian Education, Counseling, Intercultural and Urban Studies, Pastoral Studies, Theology, and Transformational Urban Leadership.

==== Professional degree programs ====
- Master’s Degrees: Master of Ministries (M.Min.), and MBA in Biblical Stewardship and Christian Management.
- Certificates: Managing Non-Profit Organisations, Professional Christian Fundraising, Biblical Interpretation, Biblical Preaching, Lay Counseling, Pastoral Ministry, and Transformational Urban Leadership.

==== Doctoral programs ====
- Doctor of Philosophy (Ph.D.) in Contextual Theology
- Doctor of Ministry (D. Min.) in Pastoral Studies
- Doctor of Missiology (D.Miss) with AGST

Additionally, several of the degrees offered by Asian Theological Seminary are available as online programs.

=== Student awards and prizes ===
ATS gives out annual awards in recognition of excellence achieved by graduating students in a range of areas. The vocational awards include the Christian Education Award, the Church History/Missions Award, the Community Service Award, the Counseling Award, the Cross-Cultural Missions Award, the Evangelism/Church Planting Award, the Expository Preaching Award, the Pastoral David Jenning Memorial Award, and the Theological Education Award. ATS also awards an annual prize for Excellence in Preaching in honor of the acclaimed American theologian and author Frederick Buechner. In addition to these vocational awards, the Seminary also awards students with prizes in recognition of academic excellence. These include the Academic Excellence Award, the Exegetical/Biblical Studies Award, and the Faculty Award.The winner of each prize is selected by relevant faculty members.
