= Benevolent Empire =

Network of Protestant reform societies in 19th-century U.S.

The Benevolent Empire is a term used to describe the network of Protestant reform societies that were prominent in the United States between 1815 and 1861. These organizations existed to spread Christianity and promote social reform.

== History ==
The Benevolent Empire was dedicated to various causes, including temperance and abolition. There were efforts to reform bankruptcy laws, the prison system, insane asylums, and labor laws. Educational reform was also a priority; reformers wanted to end school corporal punishment and provide teachers with better training and better curriculum. Voluntary societies were also created to suppress immoral behaviors such as gambling and dueling. They pushed for Blue laws in order to stop non-religious activities on Sundays. Other societies existed to help women trapped in prostitution. Societies built orphanages and provided job placement and child care programs to the urban poor.

The Benevolent Empire was inspired by the revivalism of the Second Great Awakening. For evangelical Christians, participation in benevolent societies was a way to pursue disinterested benevolence—the idea that true Christians give up self-love in favor of loving others. The belief in perfectionism also promoted the creation of reform organizations. Perfectionism is the belief that Christians can attain a higher level of sanctification or holiness by devoting themselves completely to loving God and their neighbors. Another belief encouraging benevolent societies was Postmillennialism—the belief that Christ's return would take place after the world had enjoyed a thousand years of peace (the Millennium). Ministers taught that Christians had a responsibility to improve the world to prepare it for Christ's return.

The benevolent societies were voluntary organizations and officially interdenominational. In practice, however, these societies were mainly led, staffed and funded by Congregationalists of the Hopkinsian school, New School Presbyterians and evangelical Episcopalians. These societies were organized with a board of directors (typically headquartered in New York) that provided national leadership and various auxiliary societies spread throughout the country. The auxiliaries collected money and distributed the works of the society. The boards of directors for the different societies often overlapped and held their annual meetings in May.

Examples of societies within the Benevolent Empire include:

- American Bible Society
- American Board of Commissioners for Foreign Missions
- American Home Missionary Society
- American Sunday School Union
- American Temperance Society
- American Tract Society
