= Steven Nolt =

American scholar (born 1968)

- Born: Steven M. Nolt; 1968 (age 57–58); Lancaster, Pennsylvania, US

Academic background
- Education: Goshen College; Associated Mennonite Biblical Seminary; University of Notre Dame
- Thesis: German Faith, American Faithful (1998)
- Doctoral advisor: George Marsden

Academic work
- Discipline: Anabaptist studies; history
- Sub-discipline: Amish history and culture; Mennonite history and culture
- Institutions: Elizabethtown College
- Notable works: Amish Grace (2007)

Steven M. Nolt (born 1968) is an American scholar. He serves as Senior Scholar and Professor of History and Anabaptist Studies at the Young Center for Anabaptist and Pietist Studies at Elizabethtown College. He is the author of sixteen books, which deal with Mennonite, Amish, and broader Pennsylvania German history and culture. Nolt is a frequent source for journalists and other researching Anabaptist groups. He was often quoted in the aftermath of the 2006 West Nickel Mines School shooting at Nickel Mines, Pennsylvania.

== Early life ==
Nolt was born in Lancaster, Pennsylvania, in 1968. He received his BA from Goshen College in 1990, and an MA in 1994 from Associated Mennonite Biblical Seminary. He received an MA in 1996 and a PhD in 1998, both from University of Notre Dame.

== Notable works ==
His co-authored book, Amish Grace, explores Amish forgiveness in the wake of the school shooting.

Nolt collaborated with Donald Kraybill and Karen Johnson-Weiner on the research project "Amish Diversity and Identity: Transformations in 20th Century America", funded by the National Endowment for the Humanities.

== Bibliography ==
- A History of the Amish, 1992; second ed., 2003; third ed., 2015. 406 pages. ISBN 978-1-68099-065-2
- Amish Micro-Enterprises: Models for Rural Development (with Stephen M. Smith, et al.), 1994. 110 pages.
- Amish Enterprise: From Plows to Profits (with Donald B. Kraybill), 1995; second ed., 2004. 286 pages. ISBN 0-8018-7804-7
- Through Fire and Water: An Overview of Mennonite History (with Harry Loewen), 1996; revised ed., 2010. 335 pages. ISBN 978-0-8361-9506-4
- Foreigners in Their Own Land: Pennsylvania Germans in the Early Republic, 2002. 238 pages. ISBN 0-271-02199-3
- An Amish Patchwork: Indiana's Old Orders in the Modern World (with Thomas J. Meyers), 2005. 192 pages. ISBN 0-253-21755-5
- Plain Diversity: Amish Cultures and Identities (with Thomas J. Meyers), 2007. 244 pages. ISBN 0-8018-8605-8
- Amish Grace: How Forgiveness Transcended Tragedy (with Donald B. Kraybill and David L. Weaver-Zercher), 2007. 237 pages. ISBN 0-7879-9761-7
- Mennonites, Amish, and the American Civil War (with James O. Lehman), 2007. 358 pages. ISBN 0-8018-8672-4
- The Amish Way: Patient Faith in a Perilous World (with Donald B. Kraybill and David L. Weaver-Zercher), 2010. 268 pages. ISBN 978-0-470-52069-7
- Seeking Places of Peace. A Global Mennonite History: North America (with Royden Loewen), 2012. 400 pages. ISBN 978-1-56148-797-4
- The Amish, third ed. (with John A. Hostetler and Ann E. Hostetler), 2013. 56 pages. ISBN 978-0-8361-9562-0
- The Amish (with Donald B. Kraybill and Karen M. Johnson-Weiner), 2013. 520 pages. ISBN 978-1-4214-0914-6
- The Amish: A Concise Introduction, 2016. 144 pages. ISBN 978-1-4214-1956-5
- Mellinger Mennonite Church (1717–2017), 2017. 321 pages. ISBN 978-0-692-94304-5
- People of Peace: A History of the Virginia Mennonite Conference (with Elwood E. Yoder), 2025. 524 pages. ISBN 979-8-89674-020-9
