= Diana Butler Bass =

American historian (born 1959)

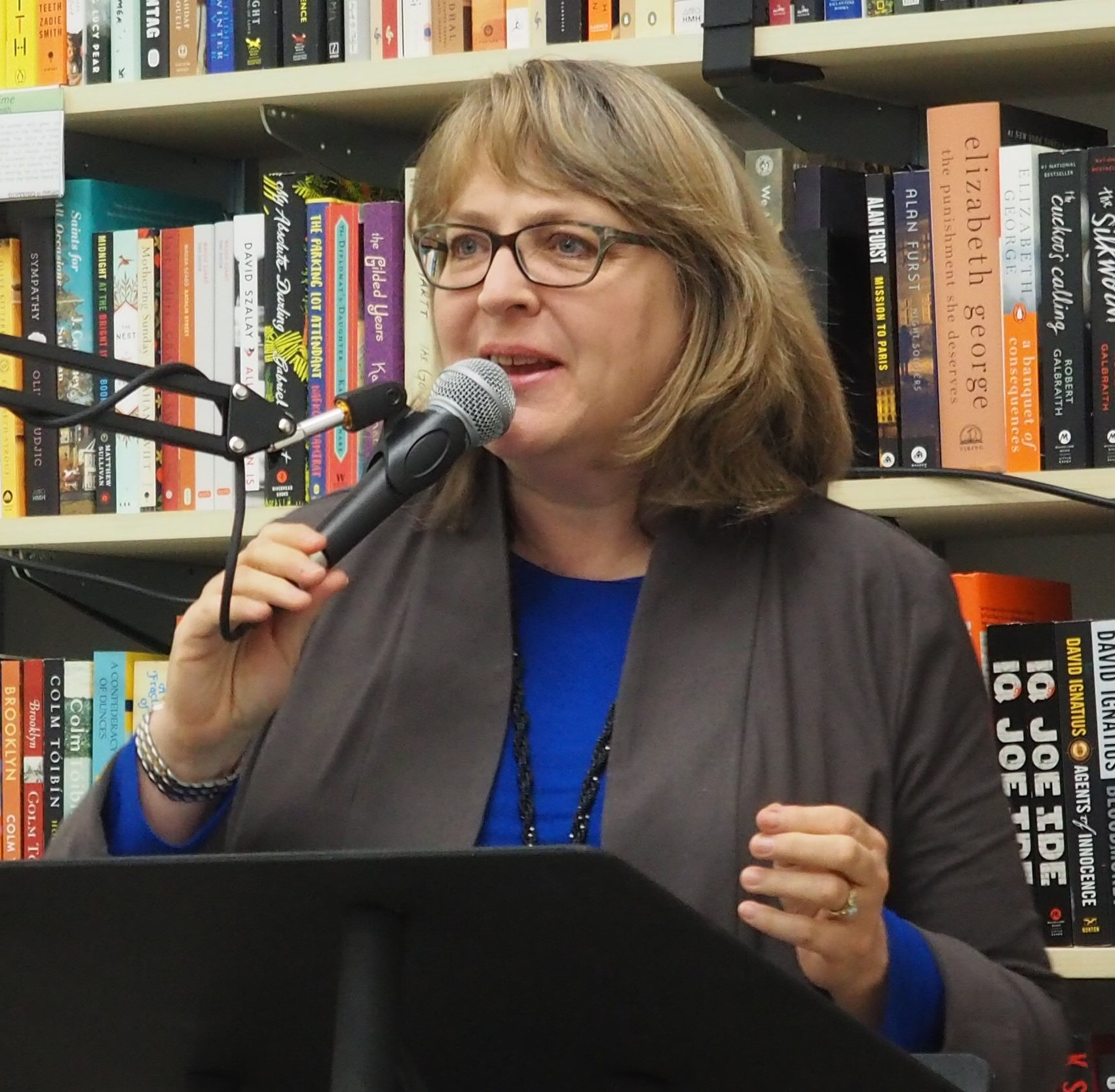
- Bass in 2018
- Born: Diana Hochstedt Butler; 1959 (age 66–67); Baltimore, Maryland, U.S.
- Spouse: Richard Bass (m. 1997) (second husband)

Academic background
- Education: Westmont College; Gordon–Conwell Theological Seminary; Duke University
- Thesis: Standing Against the Whirlwind (1991)
- Doctoral advisor: George Marsden

Academic work
- Discipline: History; religious studies
- Sub-discipline: History of American Christianity
- School or tradition: Liberal Christianity
- Institutions: Westmont College; Rhodes College; Virginia Theological Seminary
- Website: dianabutlerbass.com

Diana Butler Bass (Note: Pronounced /bæs/.) (born 1959) is an American historian of Christianity and an advocate for progressive Christianity. She is the author of eleven books.

Bass earned a PhD in religious studies from Duke University in 1991 with an emphasis on American ecclesiastical history, studying under George Marsden. From 1995 to 2000, she wrote a weekly column on religion and culture for the New York Times syndicate that appeared in more than seventy newspapers nationwide. She has blogged for the Sojourners God's Politics blog, On Faith at The Washington Post, Beliefnet, and The Huffington Post. She authored a Substack newsletter, The Cottage.

Bass is associated with Sojourners and is a member of the Episcopal Church.

== Early life and education ==
Diana Butler Bass was born Diana Hochstedt Butler in 1959, in Baltimore, Maryland. She grew up in Scottsdale, Arizona. Raised a United Methodist, she became an evangelical. She attended Westmont College, a Christian college in Santa Barbara, California, from which she received a Bachelor of Arts degree in 1981.

Bass received a Master of Arts in Theological Studies degree in ecclesiastical history from Gordon-Conwell Theological Seminary in 1986. Studying under the supervision of George Marsden, she received a Doctor of Philosophy degree in religious studies from Duke University in 1991. Her doctoral thesis was titled Standing Against the Whirlwind: The Evangelical Party in the 19th Century Protestant Episcopal Church.

Following her first marriage, she married Richard Bass on January 18, 1997.

== Career ==
Bass worked primarily as an academic for a decade before becoming an independent scholar. She began in 1991 as an assistant professor of religious studies at Westmont College, from which she was fired in 1995. She went on to serve as a history instructor at the University of California, Santa Barbara, from 1995 to 1996, as a visiting assistant professor of religious studies at Macalester College from 1996 to 1997, and as an associate professor of religious studies at Rhodes College from 1997 to 2000. In 2002, the Lilly Endowment awarded Bass a major grant to support her research on mainline Protestant churches at Virginia Theological Seminary.

== Scholarship and writings ==
Bass's books range from a study of nineteenth-century evangelicalism (Standing Against the Whirlwind: Evangelical Episcopalians in Nineteenth-Century America) to a contemporary ethnography of mainline Protestantism (Christianity for the Rest of Us: How the Neighborhood Church Is Transforming the Faith) to theological explorations of contemporary life (Grounded and Grateful) to a spiritual memoir (Strength for the Journey: A Pilgrimage of Faith in Community), the latter of which records her growing dissatisfaction with conservative evangelicalism.

== Speaking appearances ==
In 2005, Bass appeared on Religion & Ethics Newsweekly on PBS, and was, along with Martin E. Marty, one of two scholars chosen to represent mainline Protestantism in The Life of Meaning: Reflections on Faith, Doubt, and Repairing the World, a book edited by the show's host, Bob Abernethy.

In 2015, she was one of the keynote speakers at the Parliament of the World's Religions, held in Salt Lake City.

== Awards and recognition ==
Two of her books, Strength for the Journey and Christianity for the Rest of Us, have been named among the best books of their respective years by Publishers Weekly. Christianity for the Rest of Us was named book of the year by the Academy of Parish Clergy. Standing Against the Whirlwind was awarded the Frank S. and Elizabeth D. Brewer Prize by the American Society of Church History. Grounded: Finding God in the World and Grateful: The Transformative Power of Giving Thanks won the Wilbur Award as the best nonfiction book of the year from the Religion Communicators Council in 2017 and 2019, respectively.

Newspapers and magazines that have covered her work include USA Today, U.S. News & World Report, Newsweek, The Washington Post, the Los Angeles Times, and the Pittsburgh Post-Gazette.

== List of written works ==
- A Beautiful Year, St Martin’s Essential, 2025; ISBN 978-1-250-40988-1
- Freeing Jesus: Rediscovering Jesus as Friend, Teacher, Savior, Lord, Way, and Presence. HarperCollins. 2021; ISBN 978-0-06-265952-1
- Grateful: The Transformative Power of Giving Thanks. HarperCollins. 2018. ISBN 978-0-06-265951-4.
- Grounded: Finding God in the World-A Spiritual Revolution. HarperCollins. 2015. ISBN 978-0-06-232857-1.
- Christianity After Religion: The End of Church and the Birth of a New Spiritual Awakening. HarperCollins. 2012. ISBN 978-0-06-209828-3.
- A People's History of Christianity: The Other Side of the Story. HarperCollins. 2009. ISBN 978-0-06-144870-6.
- Christianity for the Rest of Us: How the Neighborhood Church Is Transforming the Faith. HarperCollins. 2006. ISBN 978-0-06-174128-9.
- From Nomads to Pilgrims: Stories from Practicing Congregations. Alban Institute. 2006. With Joseph Stewart-Sicking
- Episcopalians in America, Columbia University Press, 2006. ISBN 978-0-231-13200-8
- The Practicing Congregation: Imagining a New Old Church. Alban Institute. 2004.
- Broken We Kneel: Reflections on Faith and Citizenship. Jossey-Bass. 2004. ISBN 978-0-7879-7284-4
- Strength for the Journey: A Pilgrimage of Faith in Community. Jossey-Bass. 2002. ISBN 978-0-7879-5578-6
- (as Diana Hochstedt Butler) Standing Against the Whirlwind: Evangelical Episcopalians in Nineteenth-Century America. Oxford University Press. 1995. ISBN 9780195085426
