= SEND International =

Christian organization

- Founded: 1947
- Type: Evangelical Missions Agency
- Location: Farmington, MI
- Origins: World War II veterans in Japan and Philippines
- Region served: Asia, Europe, North America
- Members: more than 600
- Website: http://www.send.org/

SEND International is an interdenominational Christian mission agency. The organization as it is known today was formed in 1971 through the merger of Far Eastern Gospel Crusade and Central Alaskan Missions.

Central Alaskan Missions was founded in New Jersey in 1937 by Vincent James Joy, a graduate of Moody Bible Institute with a burden for missionary outreach among the Ahtna people of Alaska's Copper River Valley. By the time CAM merged with Far Eastern Gospel Crusade, Joy and his coworkers had planted nine churches, in addition to establishing Alaska Bible College, KCAM Radio, and Faith Hospital (now Cross Road Medical Center).

Far Eastern Gospel Crusade was founded in 1947 by a group of World War II veterans via the merger of G.I. Gospel Hour in the Philippines and Japan and the Far Eastern Bible Institute, which is now known as FEBIAS College of Bible in Valenzuela City.

After the 1971 merger, the organization continued to operate as Far Eastern Gospel Crusade (FEGC) until 1981, when the name was changed to "SEND International."

== See also ==
- Asian Theological Seminary
