= Michael O'Brien (historian) =

English historian (1948–2015)

Michael O'Brien FBA (13 April 1948 – 6 May 2015) was an English historian, specialising in the intellectual history of the American South. He was Professor of American Intellectual History at the University of Cambridge from 2005 to 2015.

== Life ==
Michael O'Brien was born in Plymouth, and was educated at Devonport High School in the city. He was an undergraduate and research student at Trinity Hall, Cambridge in the late 1960s and early 1970s, and studied for a further postgraduate degree at Vanderbilt University. He then taught at University of Michigan, University of Arkansas, Miami University. He was a fellow of Jesus College, Cambridge from 2002 until his death in 2015.

== Awards ==
- Woodward-Franklin Award for the Writing of Southern History, from the Fellowship of Southern Writers (2013)
- Fellow of the British Academy (2008).
- 2005 Merle Curti Award
- Bancroft Prize, Columbia University
- Frank L. and Harriet C. Owsley Award, Southern Historical Association
- C. Hugh Holman Award, Society for the Study of Southern Literature
- American Studies Network Book Prize
- Nominated Finalist for the Pulitzer Prize in History
- Nominated Finalist for the Pulitzer Prize in Biography

== Bibliography ==
- The Idea Of The American South, 1920-41. Johns Hopkins University Press. 1979. ISBN 978-0-8018-2166-0.
- All Clever Men, Who Make Their Way: Critical Discourse In The Old South. University of Georgia Press. 2008. ISBN 978-0-8203-3201-7.
- A Character Of Hugh Legare. Books on Demand. 1985. ISBN 978-0-608-07991-2.
- Michael O'Brien; David Moltke Hansen, eds. (1986). Intellectual Life In Antebellum Charleston. University of Tennessee Press.
- Rethinking The South: Essays In Intellectual History. University of Georgia Press. 1993. ISBN 978-0-8203-1525-6.
- Michael O'Brien, ed. (1997). An Evening When Alone: Four Journals Of Single Women In The South, 1827-67. University of Virginia Press. ISBN 978-0-8139-1732-0.
- Conjectures Of Order: Intellectual Life and The American South, 1810-60. Vol. 1. UNC Press. 2004. ISBN 978-0-8078-2800-7.
- Conjectures Of Order: Intellectual Life and The American South, 1810-60. Vol. 2. UNC Press. 2004. ISBN 978-0-8078-2800-7.
- Henry Adams and the Southern Question. University of Georgia Press. 2005. ISBN 978-0-8203-2711-2.
- Placing the South. University Press of Mississippi. 2007. ISBN 978-1-57806-934-7.
- Mrs. Adams in Winter: A Journey in the Last Days of Napoleon. Farrar, Straus and Giroux. 2010. ISBN 978-0-374-21581-1.
- Intellectual Life and the American South, 1810-1860: An Abridgment of Conjectures of Order. University of North Carolina Press. 2010. ISBN 978-0-8078-3400-8.
