= Alaska Bible College =

Private college in Alaska, United States

Coordinates: 62°06′53″N 145°31′47″W

- Motto: Becoming servant leaders with Christ-like character
- Type: Bible college
- Established: 1966; 60 years ago
- President: David Ley
- Students: 39 (Fall 2022)
- Location: Palmer, Alaska, United States
- Campus: Rural
- Colors: Red and White
- Website: www.akbible.edu

Alaska Bible College is a private Christian bible college in Palmer, Alaska. It is nationally accredited by the Association for Biblical Higher Education.

The school was established in 1966 by missionary Vincent James Joy, a graduate of Moody Bible Institute who became a pioneer missionary to the Ahtna people and also founded Central Alaskan Missions (which is now a branch of SEND International). Joy began ABC with a focus on theological education for those preparing for ministry within Alaska.

A primary distinctive of the school is its emphasis on training individuals, including Alaska Natives, for rural ministry in the Far North.
