= Thomas S. Kidd =

American historian (born 1971)

- Born: 1971 (age 54–55)

Academic background
- Education: Clemson University; University of Notre Dame
- Thesis: From Puritan to Evangelical : Changing Culture in New England, 1689-1740 (2001)
- Doctoral advisor: George Marsden

Academic work
- Discipline: History
- Sub-discipline: American history; ecclesiastical history
- Institutions: Baylor University; Midwestern Baptist Theological Seminary
- Main interests: 18th-century North American evangelicalism

Thomas S. Kidd (born 1971) is an American historian of religion who is John and Sharon Yeats Endowed Chair of Baptist Studies at Baylor University, and Research Professor of Church History at Midwestern Baptist Theological Seminary. Before becoming a professor, Kidd studied at the University of Notre Dame. He is a notable historian and author of such books as George Whitefield, a biography on the 18th-century Anglo-American preacher. Kidd credits George Whitefield as being "profoundly influential on the American nation's founding."

== Books ==
- Kidd, Thomas S. (2009). American Christians and Islam: Evangelical Culture and Muslims from the Colonial Period to the Age of Terrorism. Princeton: Princeton University Press. ISBN 9780691186191.
- ——— (2010). God of Liberty: A Religious History of the American Revolution. New York: Basic Books. ISBN 978-0-465-02277-9.
- ——— (2011). Patrick Henry: First Among Patriots. New York: Basic Books. ISBN 978-0-465-02810-8.
- ——— (2014). George Whitefield: America's Spiritual Founding Father. New Haven: Yale University Press. ISBN 9780300182125.
- ———; Hankins, Barry (2015). Baptists in America: A History. Oxford University Press. ISBN 9780199977536.
- ——— (2018). Benjamin Franklin: The Religious Life of a Founding Father. New Haven: Yale University Press. ISBN 978-0300240177.
- ——— (2019). America's Religious History: Faith, Politics, and the Shaping of a Nation. Grand Rapids: Zondervan Academic. ISBN 978-0-310-58617-3.
- ——— (2019). American History, Combined Edition: 1492 - Present. B&H Publishing Group. ISBN 9781535982252.
- ——— (2022). Thomas Jefferson: A Biography of Spirit and Flesh. New Haven: Yale University Press. ISBN 978-0-300-25006-0.

=== Articles and chapters ===
- ——— (2003). "'Is It Worse to Follow Mahomet than the Devil?' Early American Uses of Islam". Church History. 72 (4): 766–790. doi:10.1017/S0009640700097377.
- ——— (2003). "'Let Hell and Rome Do Their Worst': World News, Anti-Catholicism, and International Protestantism in Early-Eighteenth-Century Boston". The New England Quarterly. 76 (2): 265–290. doi:10.2307/1559905. JSTOR 1559905.
- ——— (2004). "Recovering 'The French Convert': Views of the French and the Uses of Anti-Catholicism in Early America". Book History. 7 (1): 97–111. doi:10.1353/bh.2004.0018.
- ——— (2004). "Conference Review: The Edwards at 300 Symposium and the Future of Jonathan Edwards Studies". Early American Literature. 39 (2): 405. doi:10.1353/eal.2004.0030.
- ——— (2004). "'THE VERY VITAL BREATH OF CHRISTIANITY': Prayer and Revival in Provincial New England". Fides et historia. 36 (2): 19–.
- ——— (2006). "The Healing of Mercy Wheeler: Illness and Miracles among Early American Evangelicals". The William and Mary Quarterly. 63 (1): 149–170. doi:10.2307/3491729. JSTOR 3491729.
- ——— (2011). "Lauren F. Winner, A Cheerful and Comfortable Faith: Anglican Religious Practice in the Elite Households of Eighteenth-Century Virginia". Fides et Historia. 43 (2): 151.
- ——— (2013). "When Benjamin Franklin Met the Reverend Whitefield: Enlightenment, Revival, and the Power of the Printed Word by Peter Charles Hoffer (review)". Pennsylvania History. 80 (4): 549–551. doi:10.5325/pennhistory.80.4.0549.
- ——— (2015). "The Bebbington quadrilateral and the work of the holy spirit". Fides et Historia. 47 (1): 54.
- ——— (2016). "Christ in college". First Things (265): 8.
- ——— (2023). "Nothingarians: The Fear of the Unchurched in Early National America". Journal of the Early Republic. 43 (2): 269–299. doi:10.1353/jer.2023.a897986.
