= KCAM-FM =

- Glennallen, Alaska; United States
- Frequency: 88.7 MHz
- Branding: The Light

Programming
- Format: Contemporary Christian

Ownership
- Owner: Joy Media Ministries

History
- First air date: 2011

Technical information
- Licensing authority: FCC
- Facility ID: 173007
- Class: A
- ERP: 1,700 watts
- HAAT: 73 meters (240 ft)
- Transmitter coordinates: 62°6′52″N 145°32′7″W

Links
- Public license information: Public file; LMS
- Website: www.kcam.org

KCAM-FM is a radio station licensed to Glennallen, Alaska, broadcasting on 88.7 FM. The station airs a contemporary Christian music format, and is owned by Joy Media Ministries.
