= List of Harvard College freshman dormitories =

This is a list of dormitories at Harvard College. Only freshmen live in these dormitories, which are located in and around Harvard Yard. Sophomores, juniors and seniors live in the House system.

== Apley Court ==
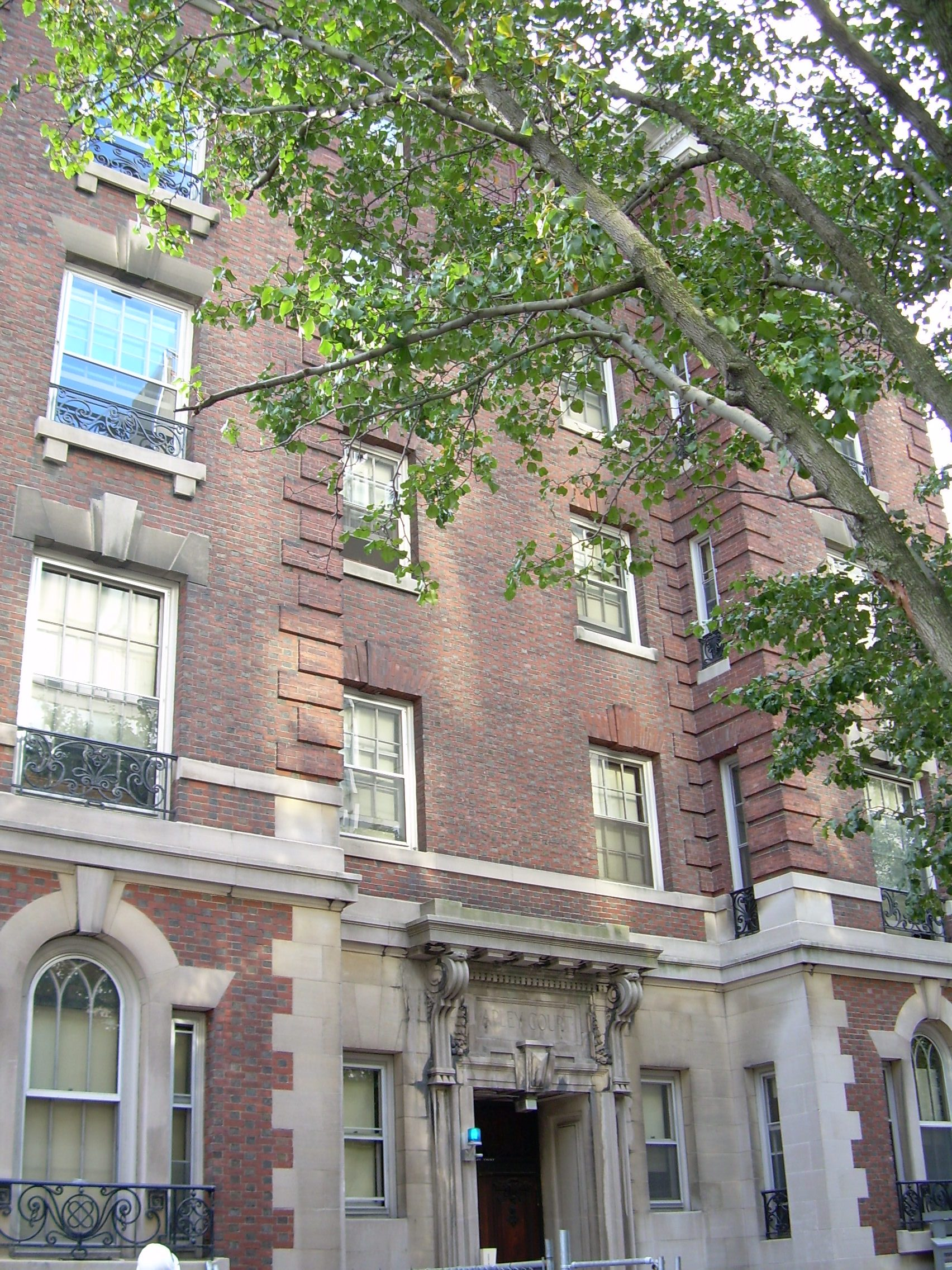
Apley Court

South of Harvard Yard on Holyoke Street, Apley Court has the most spacious rooms among the freshman dorms; accommodations include marble bathrooms. Formerly part of Adams House, it is the only one of the Gold Coast apartment buildings – luxurious private apartments built south of the Yard in the late 1890s – to now be a freshman dormitory. Notable residents have included T. S. Eliot.

== Canaday Hall ==
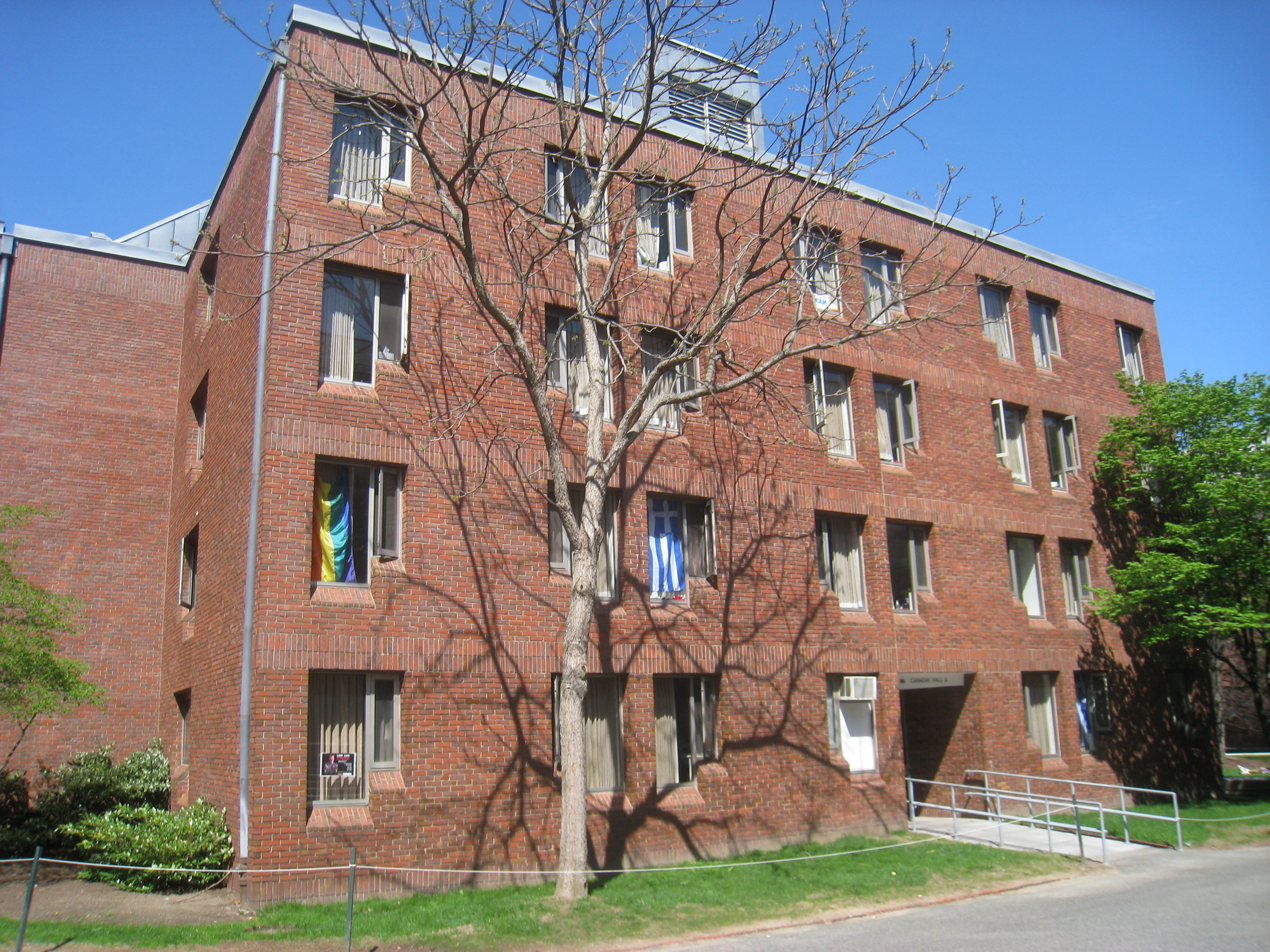
Canaday Hall

Completed in 1974, Canaday Hall is the newest dormitory in Harvard Yard. Seen from the air, its seven buildings resemble a question mark. It is named after Ward M. Canaday, former president and major shareholder of Willys, manufacturer of Jeeps during World War II.

Canaday's construction immediately followed the 1969 student takeover of University Hall, and certain features of its design were meant to confound student organizing. There is a Muslim prayer space in the basement.

Residents have included Jillian Dempsey, Alexander Fällström, Charles Lane, Eduardo Saverin, Esther Lofgren, Ben Mezrich, David Sacks, Mira Sorvino, and Paul Wylie.

== Grays Hall ==
Grays Hall

Opened in 1863, Grays became the college's first building with water taps in the basement. (Residents of other buildings in Harvard Yard had to haul water from pumps in the Yard.) Nicknamed "The Harvard Hilton", it is considered the most luxurious dormitory in the Yard.

Past residents include Jeff Bingaman, Rosa Brooks, Charles Joseph Bonaparte, Michael Cohrs, Jeremy Doner, Ryan Fitzpatrick, Langdon Gilkey, Charles Grier Sellers, Swinburne Hale, Julie Hilden, Marcial Lichauco, Norman Mailer, Malia Obama, Natalie Portman, Joseph Ransohoff, Frank Rich, Mo Rocca, Joshua Sharfstein, Don Sweeney, John Weidman, and Michael Weishan.

== Greenough Hall ==
Located just outside the confines of Harvard Yard, Greenough is part of a group of dormitories outside the Yard called the "Union Dormitories". Past notable residents include Elliott Abrams, Bill Kristol, Wallace Shawn, Laurence Tribe, Kyriakos Mitsotakis, and Colin Jost.

== Hollis Hall ==
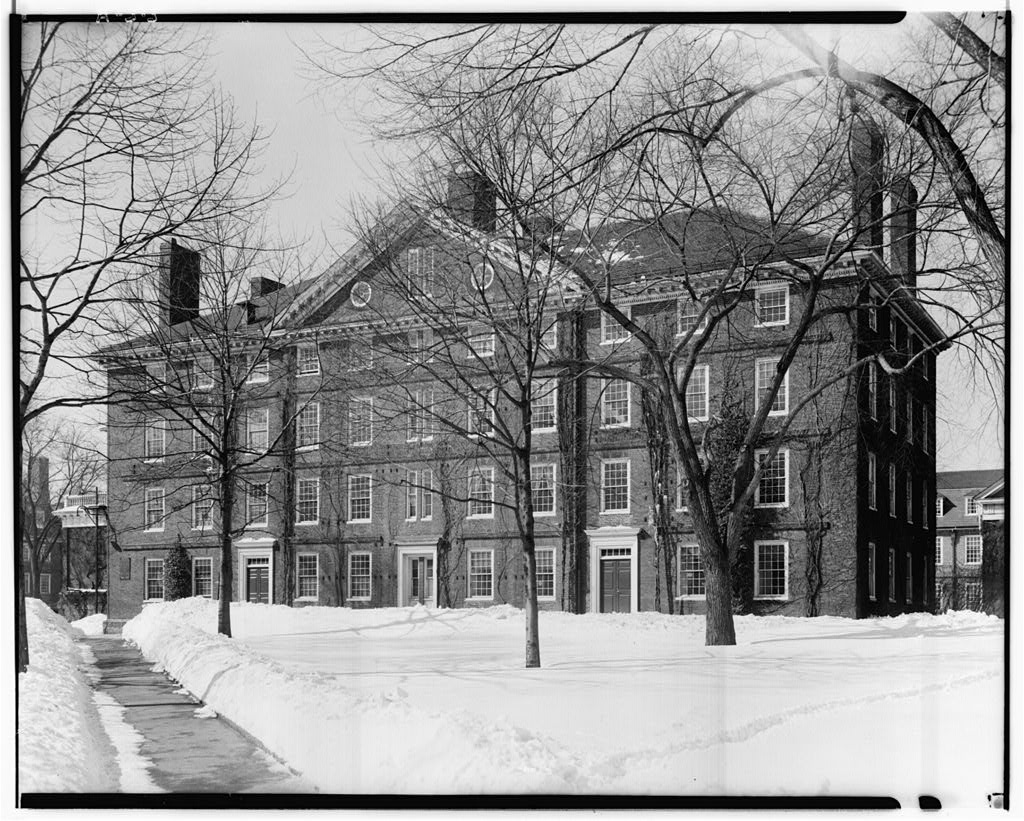
Hollis Hall in 1934

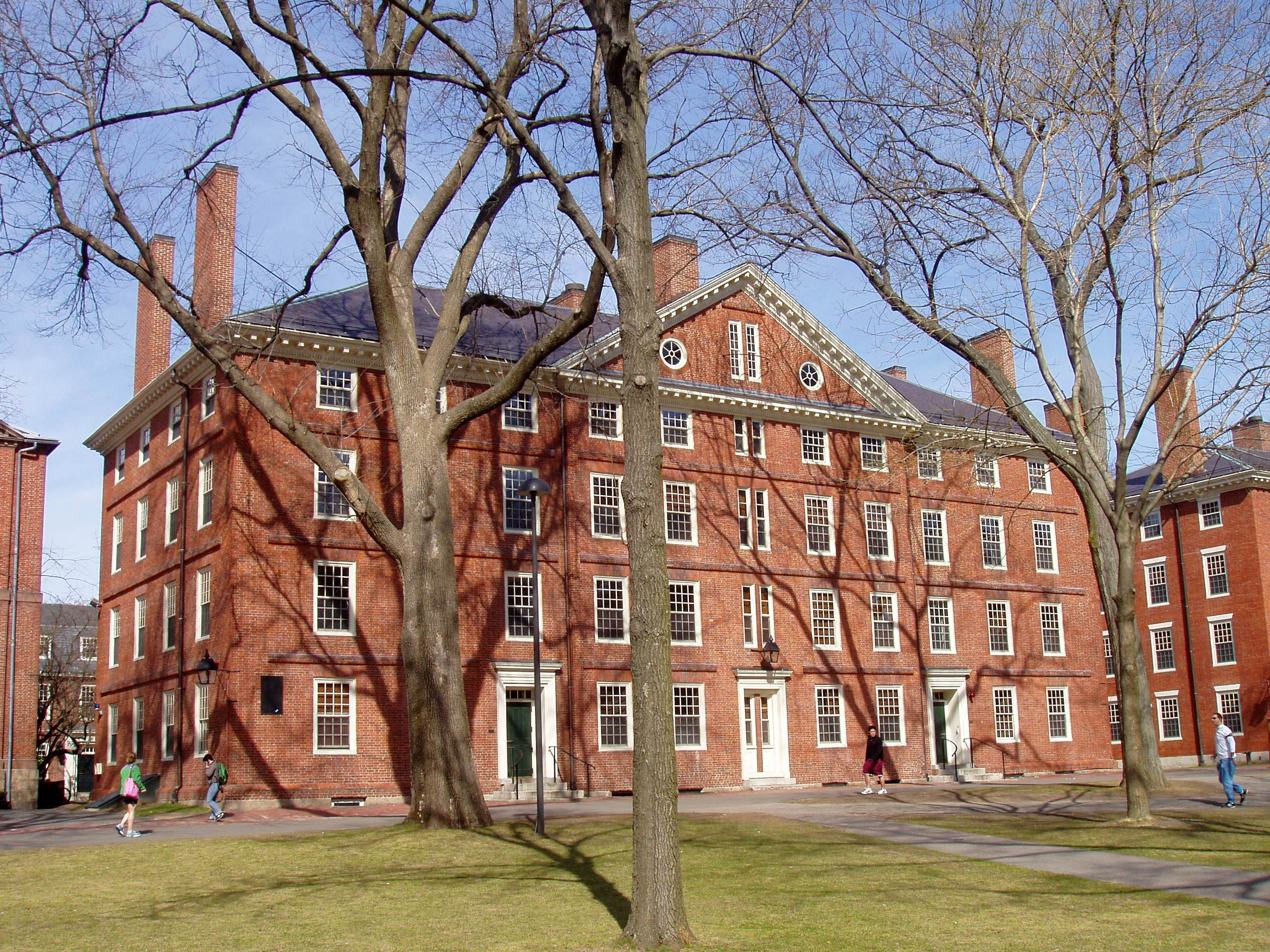
Hollis Hall in 2007

Built in 1763 by Thomas Dawes and named for Thomas Hollis and his family, Hollis is one of the oldest buildings at Harvard (after only Massachusetts Hall (1720) and Holden Chapel (1744)), and housed George Washington's troops during the American Revolution. Past residents include Charles Francis Adams Sr., John Quincy Adams, Horatio Alger Jr., Jim Cramer, Ralph Waldo Emerson, Edward Everett, Boisfeuillet Jones Jr., Joseph P. Kennedy Sr., Wendell Phillips, Henry David Thoreau, George Santayana, Charles Sumner, John Updike, and William Weld.

== Holworthy Hall ==
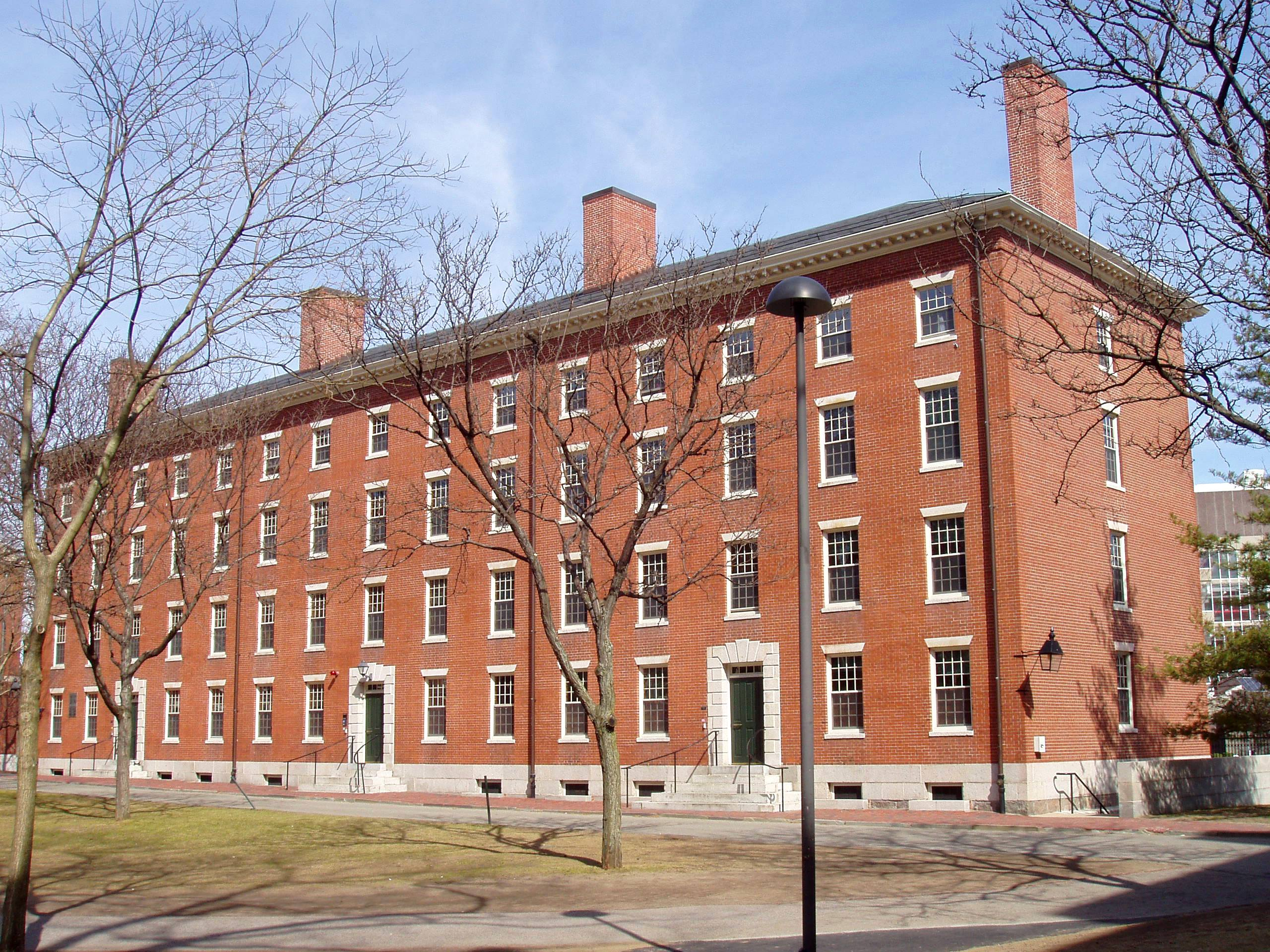
Holworthy Hall

Holworthy Hall was built in 1812 and was named after Sir Matthew Holworthy, a wealthy merchant who made what was, at the time, the largest donation to Harvard in its history. Past residents include Pete Buttigieg, Al Jean, Horatio Alger Jr., Alex Biega, David Halberstam, Christian Herter, Conan O'Brien, Sumner Redstone, Henry Hobson Richardson, Noah Welch, Cornel West, and Jeff Zucker.

== Hurlbut Hall ==
Another "Union" dormitory, named after Byron Hurlbut, a former Dean of Harvard College.

Past notable residents include James Blake, Alice Crary, Roger W. Ferguson Jr., Brian Greene, Amory Lovins, Roger Myerson, and Elizabeth Wurtzel.

== Lionel Hall ==
Lionel (built 1925) was given by Harvard President A. Lawrence Lowell as a memorial to Lionel de Jersey Harvard, the first relative of John Harvard to attend Harvard, and who was killed in World War I. Past residents include Peter Benchley, Lou Dobbs, Kevin Kallaugher, Grover Norquist, Endicott Peabody, and Erich Segal.

== Massachusetts Hall ==
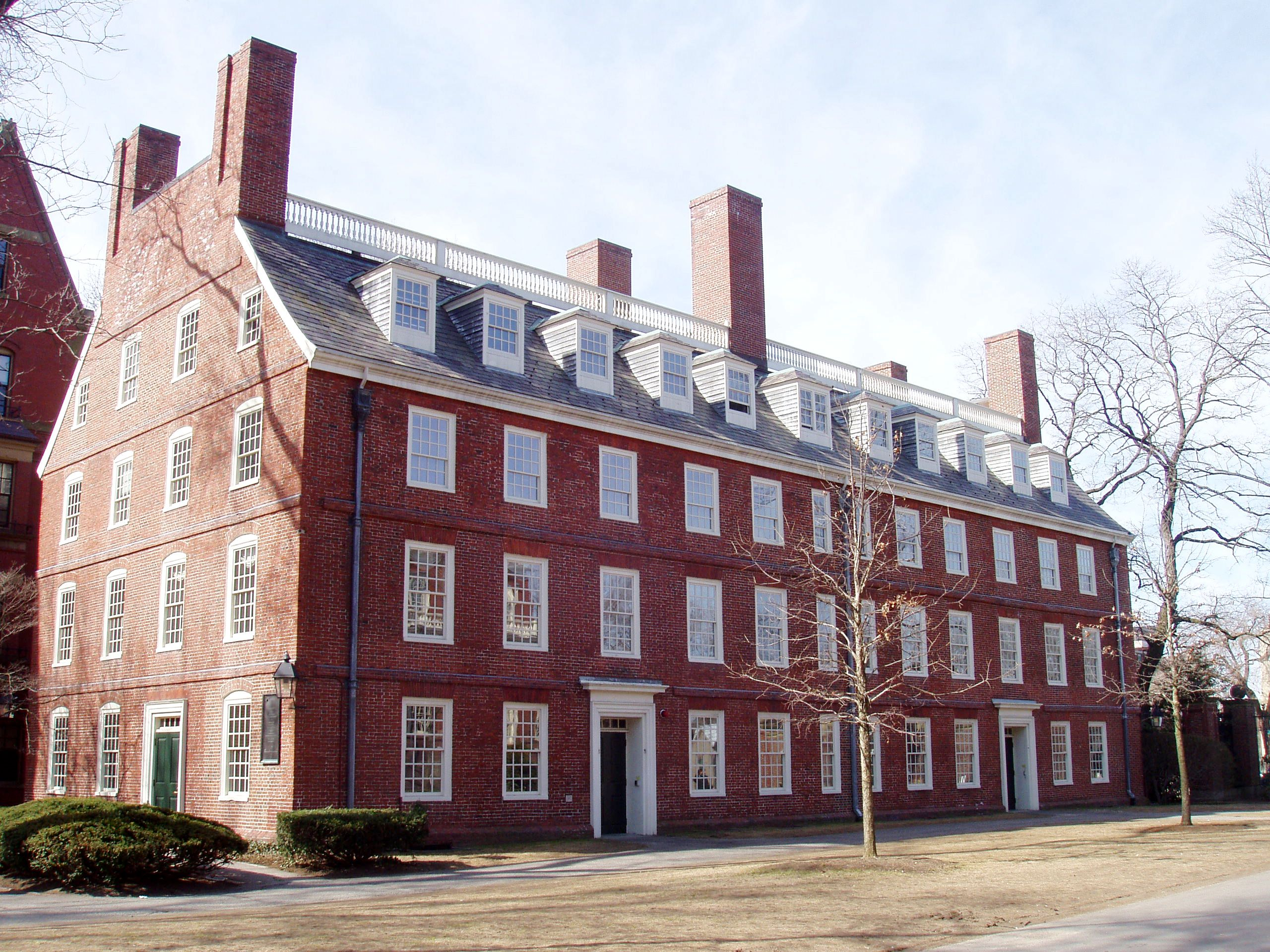
Massachusetts Hall

The oldest surviving building at Harvard and the country's oldest dormitory, Massachusetts Hall is located next to Johnston Gate. Designed by two Harvard Presidents, John Leverett and Benjamin Wadsworth, between 1718 and 1720 for the housing of sixty-four students, the building served various functions over the years, including a refuge for American soldiers during the Siege of Boston, and an observatory after Thomas Hollis' donation of a twenty-four-foot telescope in 1722. Today, it houses the offices of Harvard's president, with a handful of freshmen living on the uppermost floor.

Five of the United States' Founding Fathers lived here: John Adams, John Hancock, Samuel Adams, Elbridge Gerry, and James Otis Jr. Other residents have included Zabdiel Adams, John Harbison, Alan Jay Lerner, John Redcliffe-Maud, Elliot Richardson, Jared Sparks, Jones Very, and Edward Wigglesworth.

== Matthews Hall ==
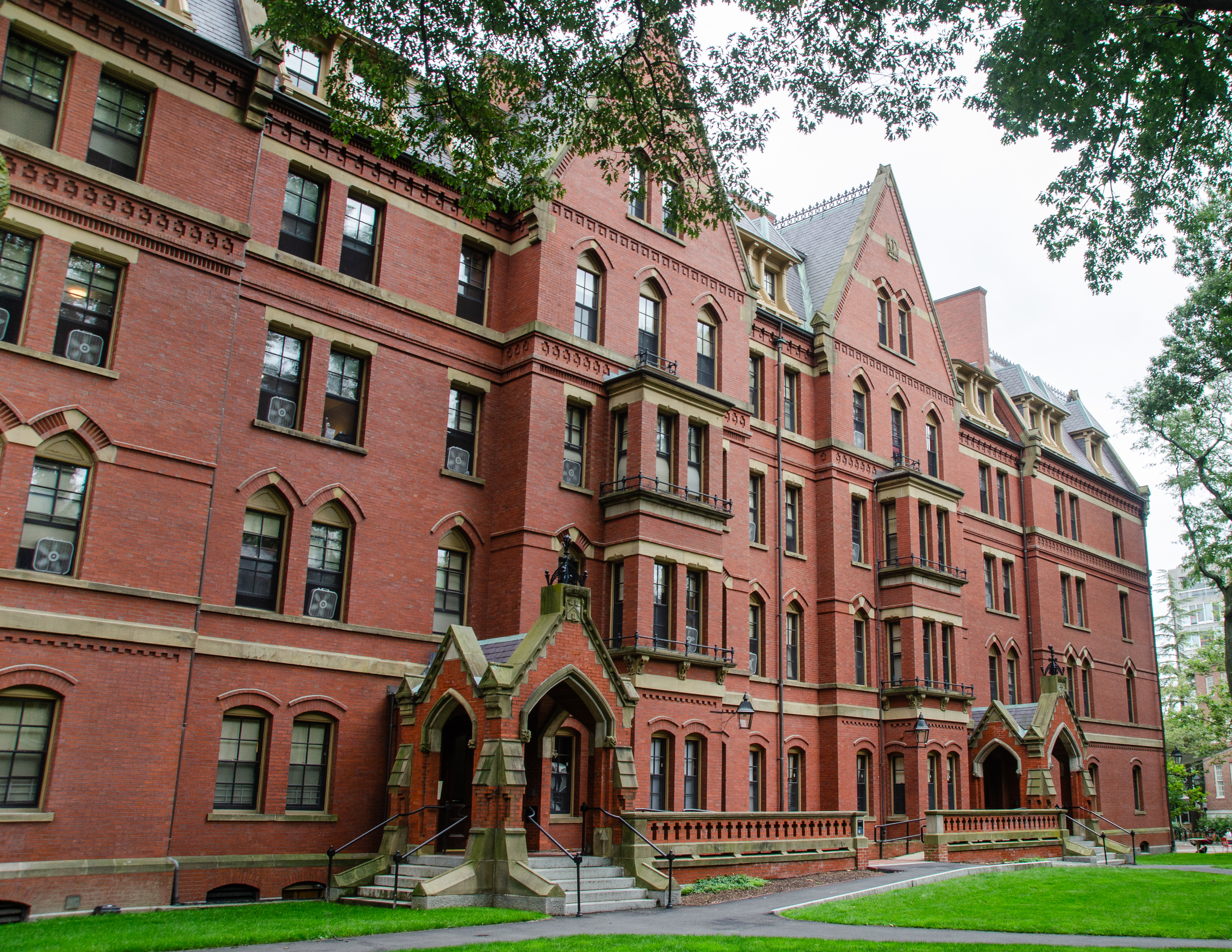
Matthews Hall

Matthews Hall was designed by Peabody & Stearns and built from 1871 to 1872.

Past notable residents include Philip Warren Anderson, Danny Biega, Matt Birk, Matt Damon, John Dos Passos, Maura Healey, Barney Frank, William Randolph Hearst, Mark Penn, Daniel Quillen, Robert Rubin, Chuck Schumer, Lloyd Shapley, Maurice Wertheim, and Elizabeth Wurtzel.

== Mower Hall ==
Built in 1925, Mower Hall is named for Thomas Gardiner Mower of the class of 1810, (Note: https://harvardplanning.emuseum.com/sites/953/mower-hall) (Note: https://www.thecrimson.com/article/1925/4/1/will-name-holden-twins-lionel-and/), who was also the namesake of Philadelphia Mower General Hospital.

Past residents include Timothy Crouse, Al Franken, Al Gore, Edward Gorey, Tommy Lee Jones, Arthur Kopit, Charles Murray, Thomas Oliphant, Meredith Salenger, Tanya Selvaratnam, and Bob Somerby.

== Pennypacker Hall ==
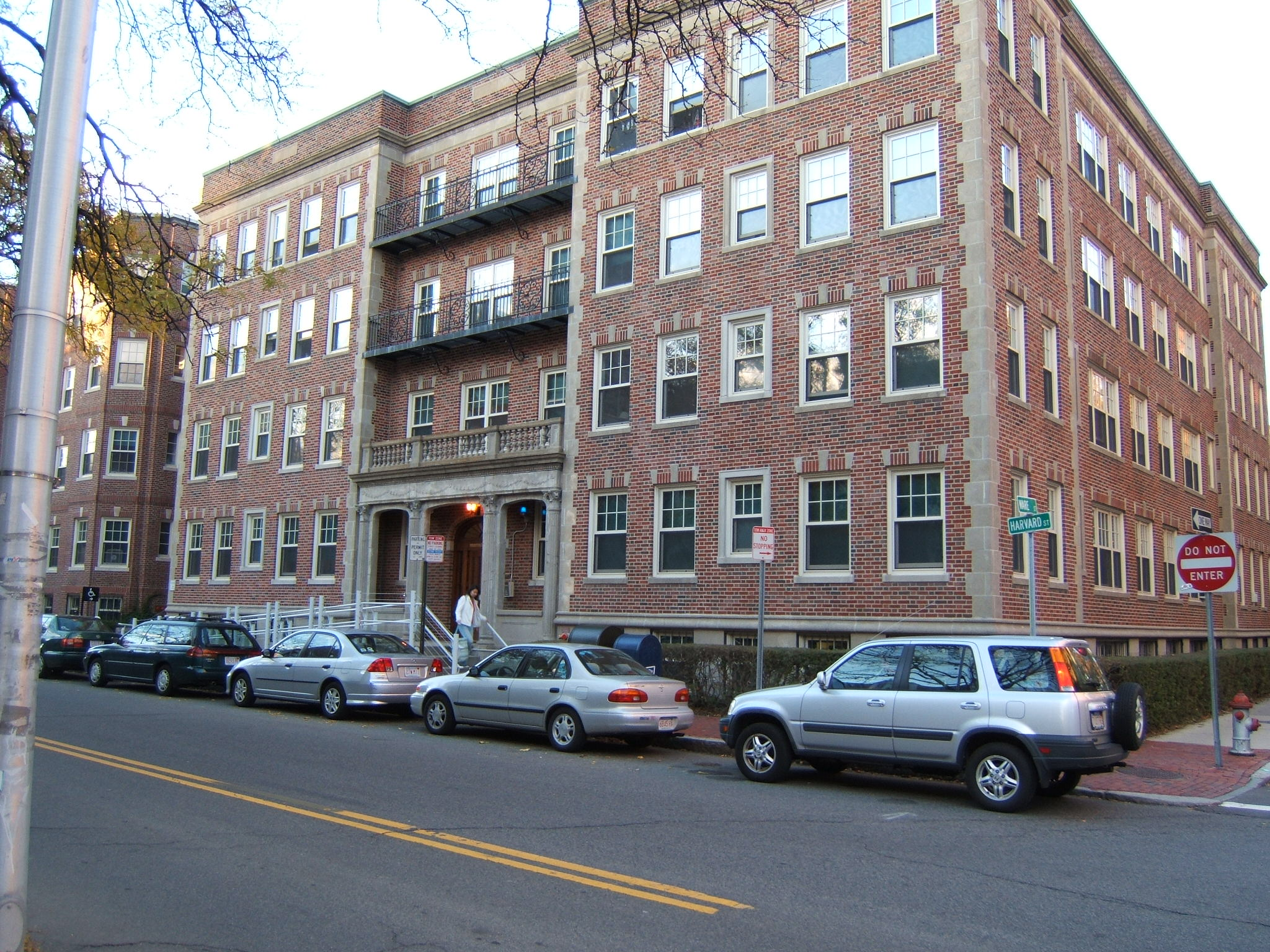
Pennypacker Hall

Part of the Union Dormitories, Pennypacker is named for Henry Pennypacker, a former president of Harvard's admissions committee. The studios of radio station WHRB (95.3 FM) are in the basement.

Past residents include Kristin Goss, Hendrik Hertzberg, Nicholas Kristof, Bjorn Poonen, Peter Sagal, Andrew Tobias, Chris Wallace, and Fernando Zobel de Ayala.

== Stoughton Hall ==
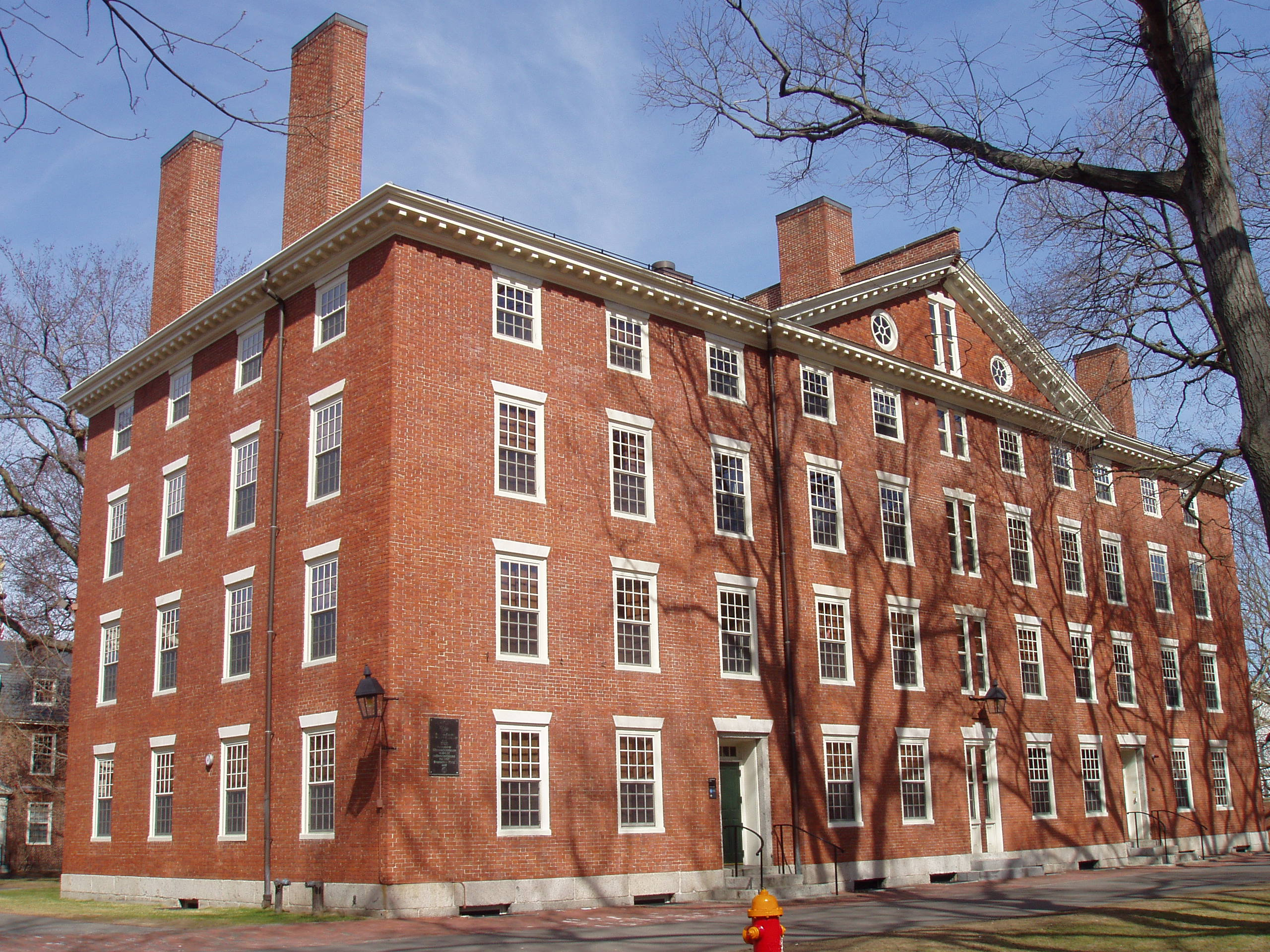
Stoughton Hall

Stoughton Hall (built 1805) is Harvard's second building to be named Stoughton Hall. Designed by Charles Bulfinch, it was built by Thomas Dawes. The original Stoughton Hall was built in 1700 and funded by Massachusetts Lieutenant Governor William Stoughton, who also presided over the Salem witch trials. Past residents include Francis Parkman, Philippe de Montebello, Trip Hawkins, Jeremy Lin, Eric Maskin, Mehmet Oz, Nathan Pusey, Dan Rawson, Sydney Schanberg, and Edmund Ware Sinnott.

== Straus Hall ==
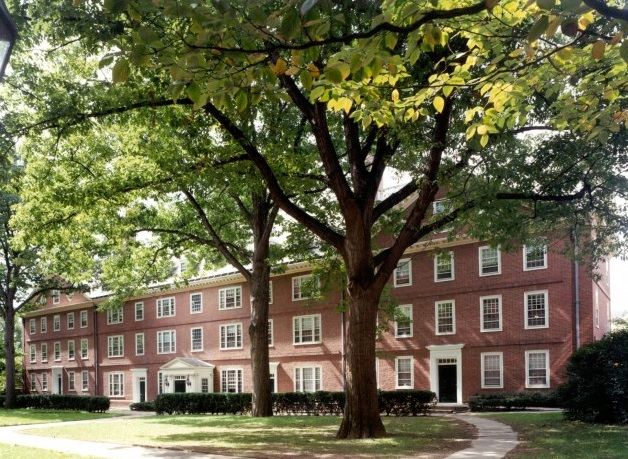
Straus Hall

Straus was built in 1926 by three brothers in memory of their parents, Isidor and Ida Straus, New York department store entrepreneurs who owned both Macy's and Abraham & Straus and died in the sinking of the RMS Titanic.

Notable residents include Darren Aronofsky, Phil Bredesen, William S. Burroughs, Peter Chiarelli, Seth Goldman, Joseph Lelyveld, Soledad O'Brien, Tom Ridge, John Roberts, David Souter, Caspar Weinberger, Tim Wirth, and Mark Zuckerberg.

== Thayer Hall ==
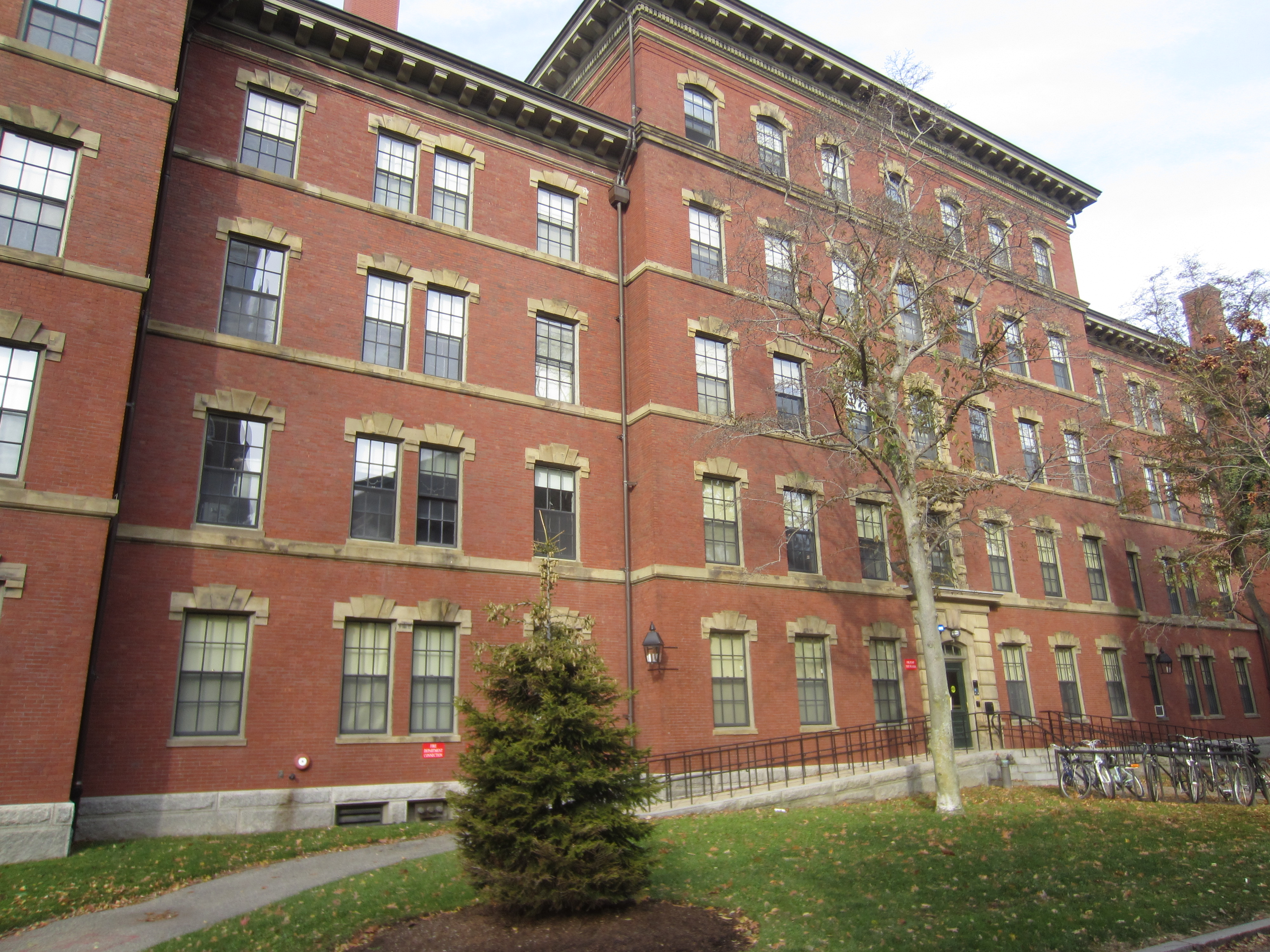
Thayer Hall

Thayer was built in 1870 and originally offered housing to students who had trouble affording the ever-increasing prices of housing outside the university. Past notable residents include James Agee, Bill Ackman, Conrad Aiken, Steve Ballmer, Virgilio Barco Isakson, Andy Borowitz, Hamzah bin al Hussein, E. E. Cummings, Roy J. Glauber, Walter Isaacson, Ji Chaozhu, Perri Klass, Bernard Francis Law, John F. Manning, Crown Princess Masako, Jonathan Mostow, Gabe Newell, Arthur Schlesinger Jr., Edward Seaga, Jonathan Taylor Thomas, James Tobin, Stephanie Wilson, and Owen Wister.

== Weld Hall ==
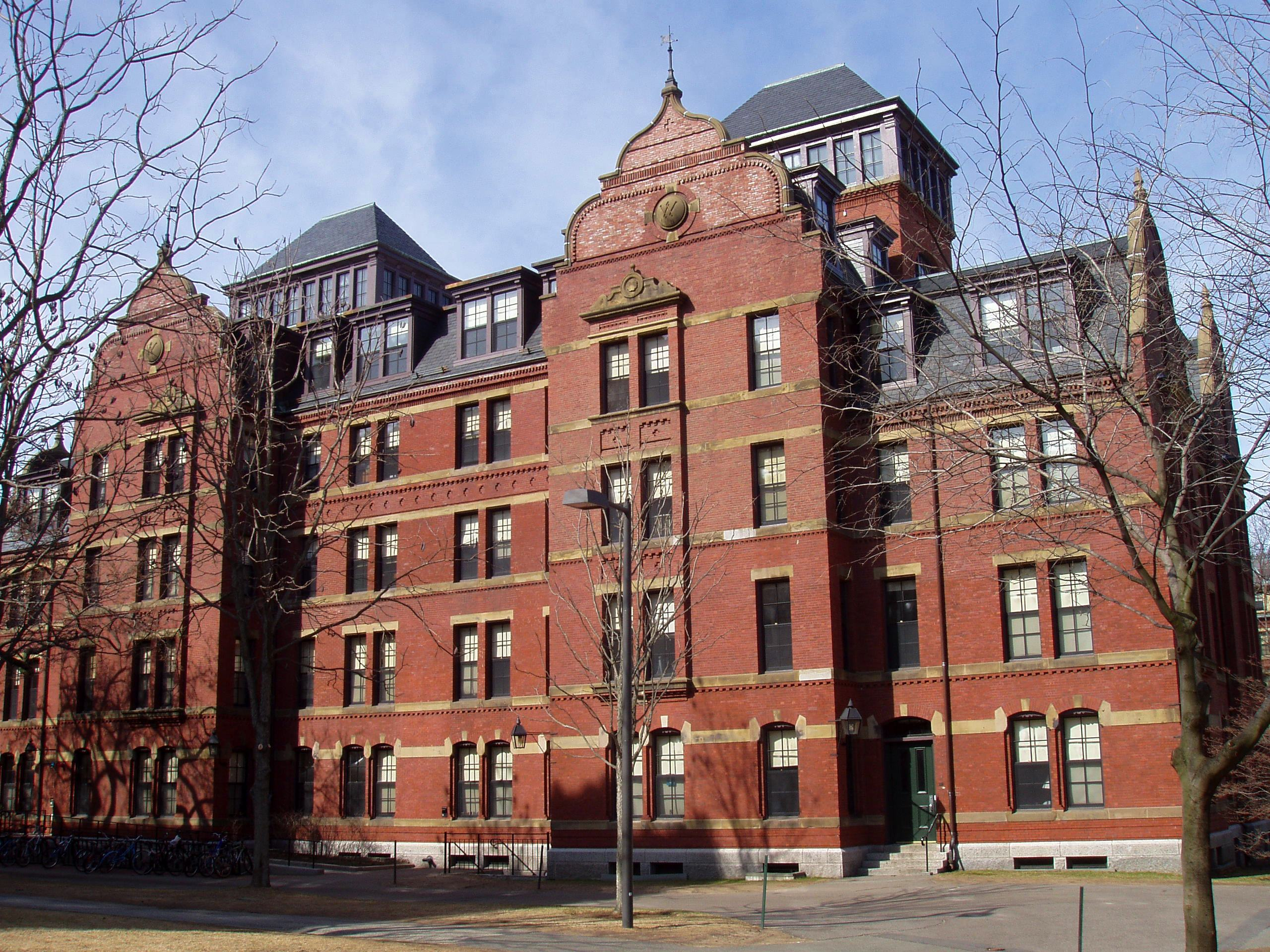
Weld Hall

Built in 1870, Weld was the second of two important additions to the Harvard campus designed by Ware & Van Brunt (the first being Memorial Hall).

It was a gift of William Fletcher Weld, in memory of his brother Stephen Minot Weld, and represented a new trend toward picturesque silhouettes that became important in American domestic architecture of the later nineteenth century, as can be seen in the Queen Anne style which was popular during the same period.

Past residents include Robert Bacon, Ben Bernanke, Michael Crichton, Christopher Durang, Daniel Ellsberg, Douglas J. Feith, Fred Grandy, Lionel de Jersey Harvard, Rashida Jones, John F. Kennedy, Douglas Kenney, Michael Kinsley, Neil H. McElroy, Neil deGrasse Tyson, Patrick Harlan and Scott Weinger.

== Wigglesworth Hall ==
Wigglesworth Hall

The second largest of the freshman dormitories, and actually three buildings, Wigglesworth is located along the southern edge of the Yard, between Widener Library and Boylston Hall to the north, and Massachusetts Avenue to the south. It was constructed in 1931 as "part of President Lowell's plan to enclose the Yard from the traffic of Harvard Square."

Past residents include Leonard Bernstein, Melissa Block, Benjamin C. Bradlee, Mark Danner, Jared Diamond, Bill Gates, Andre Gregory, Donald P. Hodel, Michael J. Kennedy, Ted Kennedy, Aga Khan IV, John Lithgow, Robert Lowell, Christopher Nowinski, Dennis Ritchie, Pat Toomey, David Vitter, Naomi Yang, and Randi Zuckerberg.

== Maple Yard Dorms ==
To accommodate the unusually large freshman class in the 2021–22 academic year, Harvard College housed first-year students in that year in several additional university-owned buildings: apartments at 20–20A and 22–24 Prescott Street, apartments at 10 DeWolfe Street, and The Inn at 1201 Massachusetts Ave. These are collectively termed "Maple Yard", one of the several smaller "Yards" into which first-year dorms are organized.

== Sources ==
- Harvard Dorm History Search for past residents
