= Harvard Yard =

Oldest part of the Harvard University campus

Coordinates: 42.37447°N 71.11719°W

- Harvard Yard Historic District
- U.S. National Register of Historic Places
- U.S. Historic district
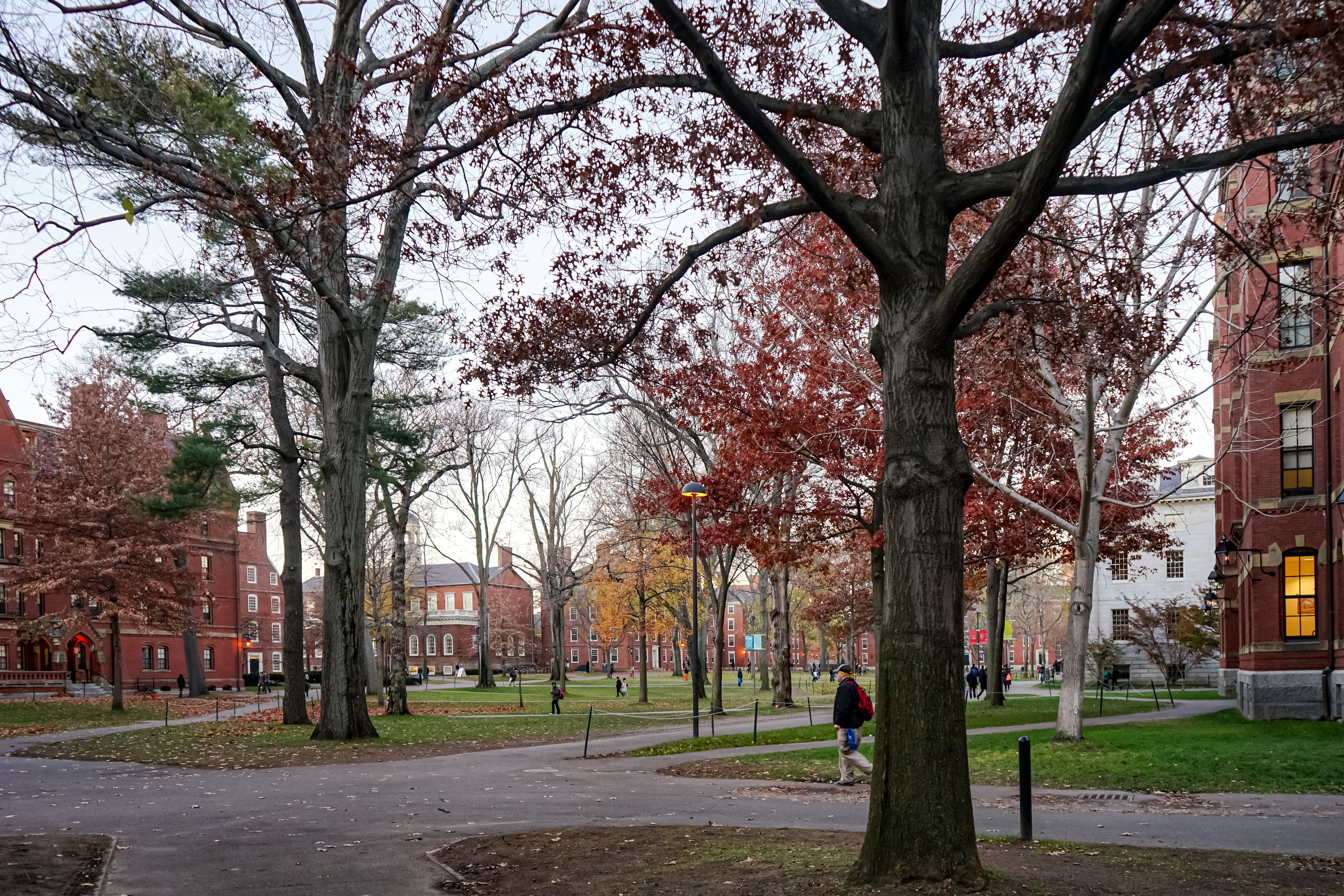
- Harvard Yard in December 2015

- Location within Massachusetts Location within the United States
- Location: Cambridge, Massachusetts, U.S.
- Built: 1673
- Architectural style: Georgian and Federal
- NRHP reference No.: 73000287 (original); 87002137 (increase)

Significant dates
- Added to NRHP: February 6, 1973
- Boundary increase: December 14, 1987

Harvard Yard is the oldest and among the most prominent parts of the campus of Harvard University in Cambridge, Massachusetts. The yard has a historic center and modern crossroads and contains most of the freshman dormitories, Harvard's most important libraries, Memorial Church, several classroom and departmental buildings, the offices of senior university officials, including the president of Harvard University, and the John Harvard statue.

The Yard grew over the centuries around Harvard College's first parcel of land, purchased in 1637. Today it is a grassy area of 22.4 acres (9.1 ha) bounded principally by Massachusetts Avenue, Cambridge Street, Broadway, and Quincy Street. Its perimeter fencing – principally iron, with some stretches of brick – has twenty-seven gates.

== Subdivisions ==
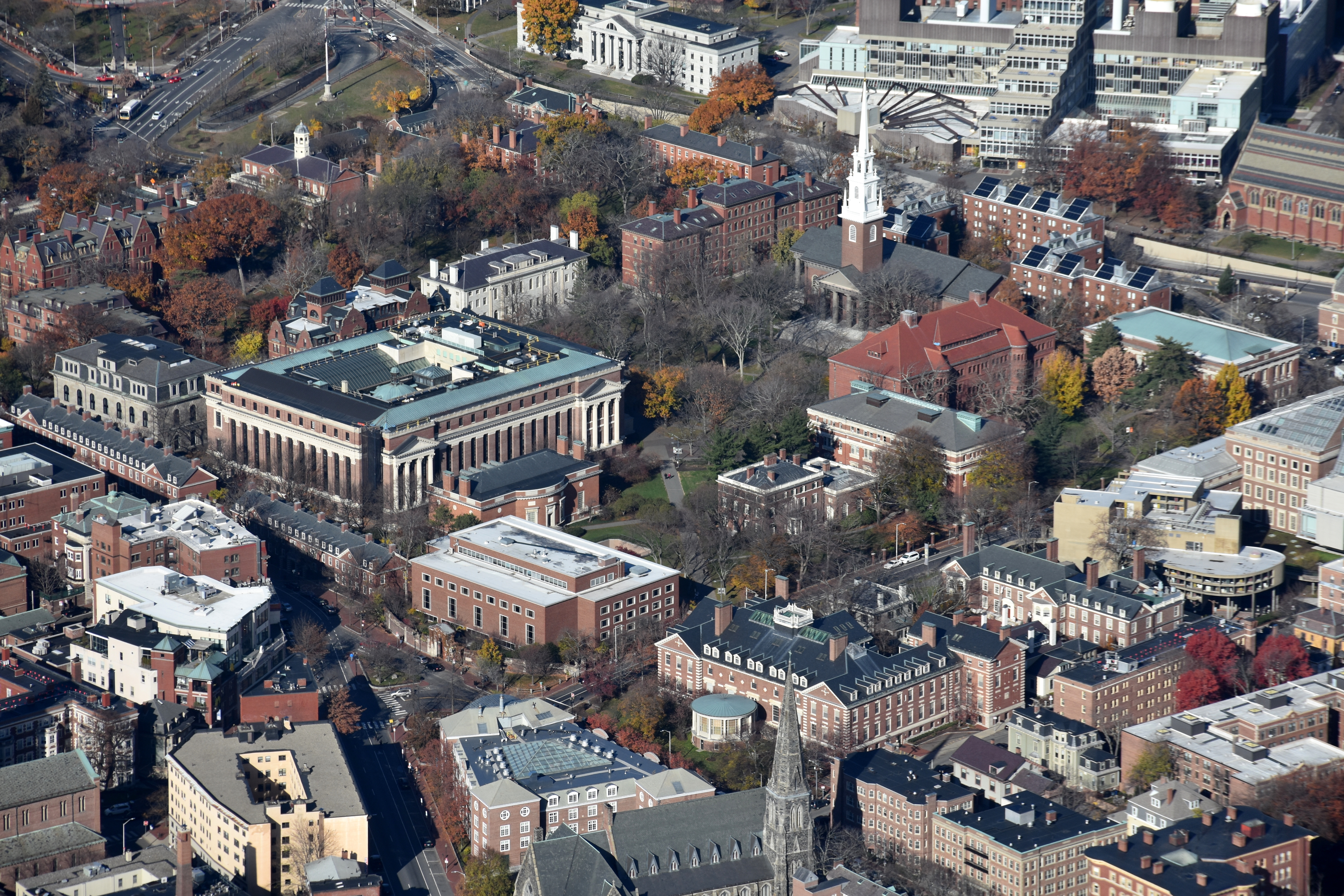
Harvard Yard and environs, from the southeast. The Yard's most prominent buildings bound Tercentenary Theatre: Widener Library (center left), Memorial Church (opposite Widener), University Hall (just beyond Widener, white with white chimneys), and Sever Hall (red roof, opposite University Hall). The Old Yard is the treed area beyond University Hall.

The center of the Yard, known as Tercentenary Theatre, is a wide grassy area bounded by Widener Library, Memorial Church, University Hall, and Sever Hall. Tercentenary Theatre is the site of annual commencement exercises and other convocations.

The western third of Harvard Yard, which opens onto Peabody Street (often mistaken for nearby Massachusetts Avenue) at Johnston Gate and abuts the center of Harvard Square to the south, is known as the Old Yard. Most of the freshman dormitories cluster around the Old Yard, including Massachusetts Hall (1720), Harvard's oldest building and the second-oldest academic building in the United States. Massachusetts Hall also houses the offices of the President of Harvard University.

The original Harvard Hall in the Old Yard housed the college library, including the books donated by John Harvard, all but one of which were destroyed when the building burned in 1764. Rebuilt in 1766, the current Harvard Hall now houses classrooms.

Across the Old Yard from Johnston Gate is University Hall (1815), whose white-granite facade was the first to challenge the red-brick Georgian style until then ascendant; between its twin west staircases stands the John Harvard statue. University Hall contains major administrative offices, including those of the Dean of the Faculty of Arts and Sciences and the Dean of Harvard College.

== Buildings ==
Libraries in the Yard are Widener Library, its connected Pusey Library annex, Houghton Library for rare books and manuscripts, and Lamont Library, the main undergraduate library. Classroom and departmental buildings include Emerson Hall, Sever Hall, Robinson Hall, and Boylston Hall. The Harvard Bixi, a Chinese stele with inscribed text, is located near Widener.

The freshman dormitories of Harvard Yard include the upper levels of Massachusetts Hall, and Wigglesworth Hall, Weld Hall, Grays Hall, Matthews Hall, Straus Hall, Mower Hall, Hollis Hall, Stoughton Hall, Lionel Hall, Holworthy Hall, Canaday Hall, and Thayer Hall.

Nestled among Mower, Hollis, Lionel, and Stoughton Halls is Holden Chapel, home of the Holden Choirs. Nearby is Phillips Brooks House, dedicated to student service to the community.

Administrative buildings in the Yard include the aforementioned University Hall and Massachusetts Hall; Loeb House, on the east side of the Yard; and Wadsworth House, on the south side. Loeb House is the home of Harvard's governing bodies: the Harvard Corporation and the Board of Overseers. Wadsworth House houses the Harvard University Librarian and the Office of the University Marshal, among others. Lehman Hall, at the southwestern corner of the Yard, provides administrative services for students who live off-campus.

== Images ==
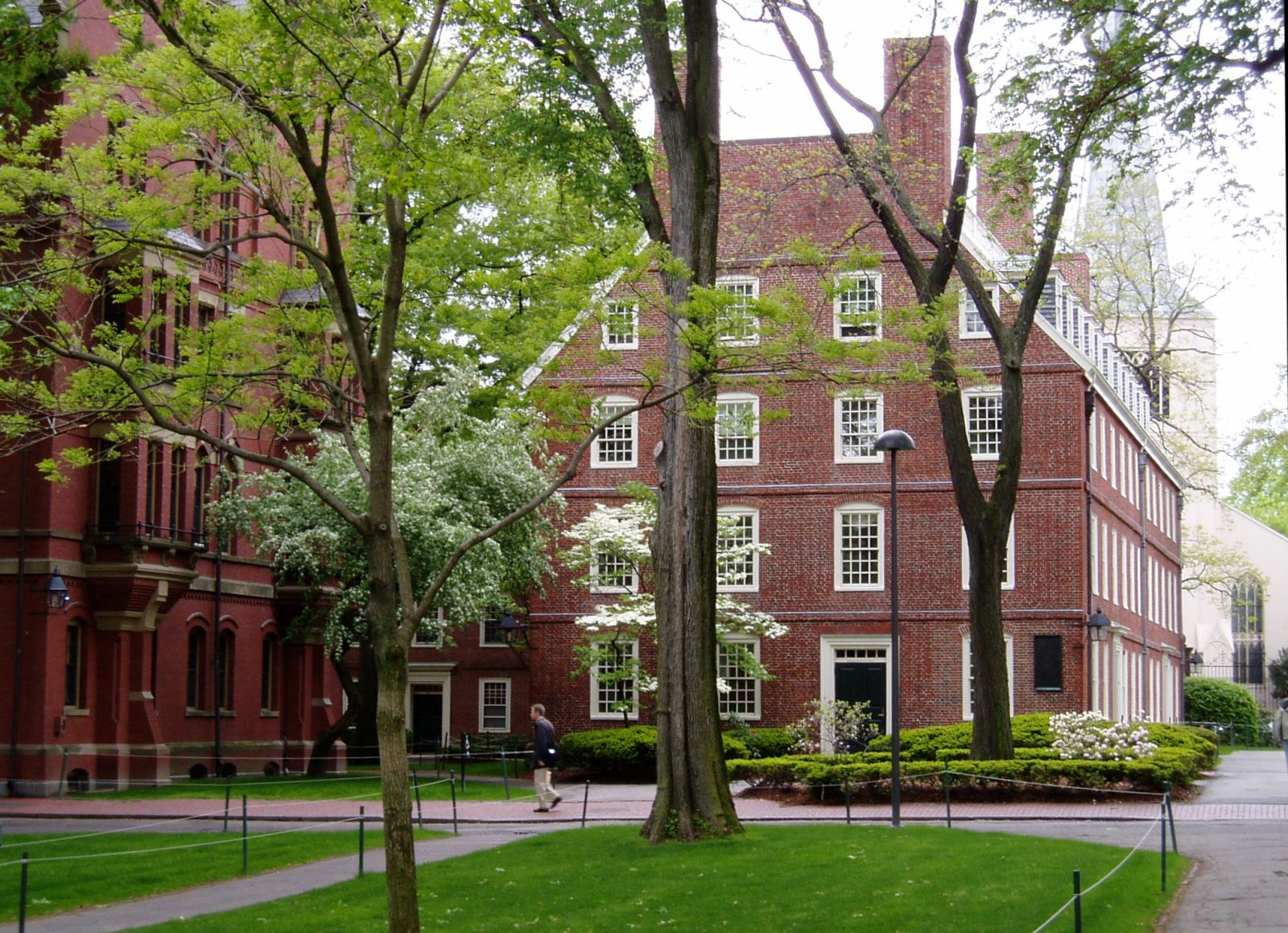
Massachusetts Hall

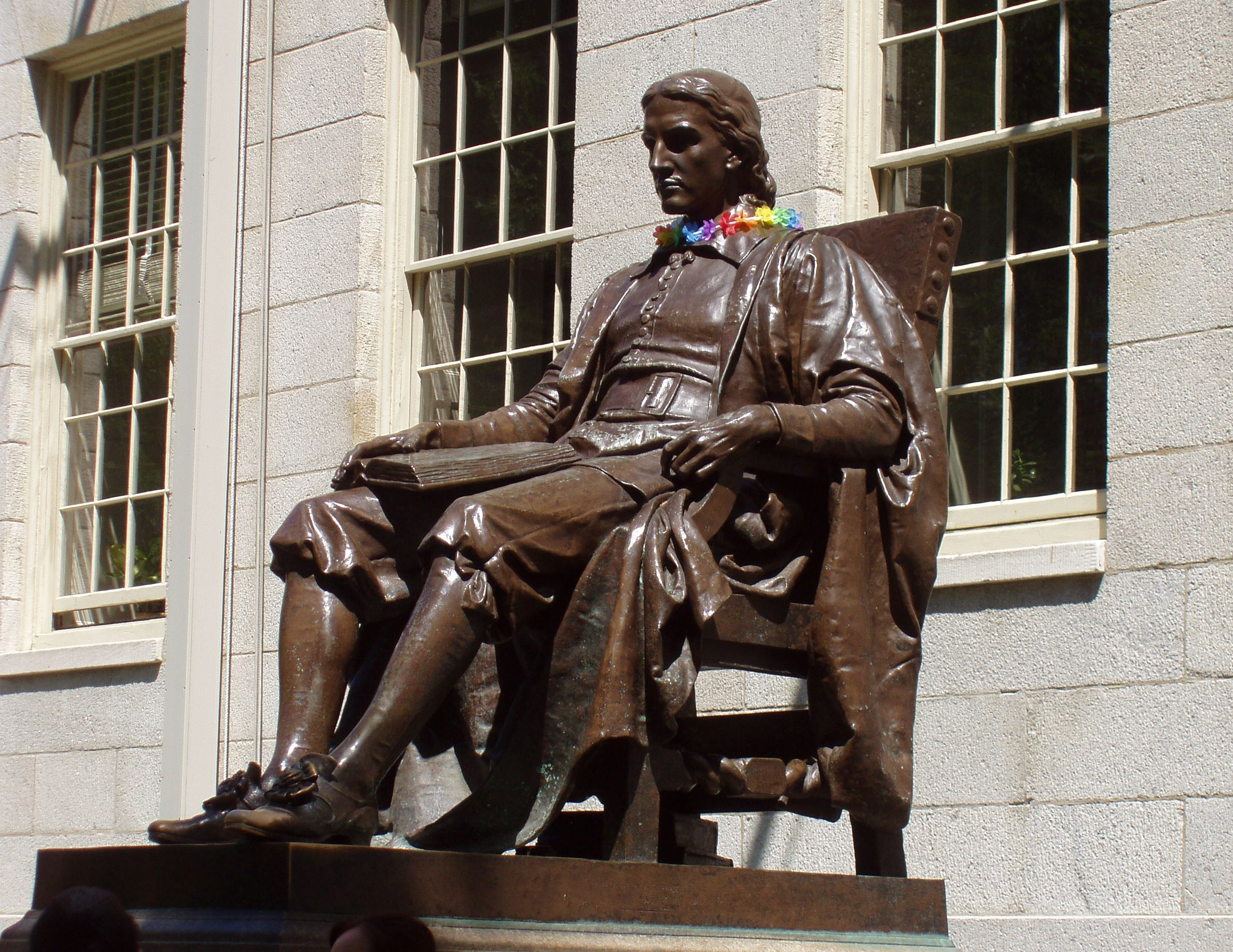
John Harvard statue

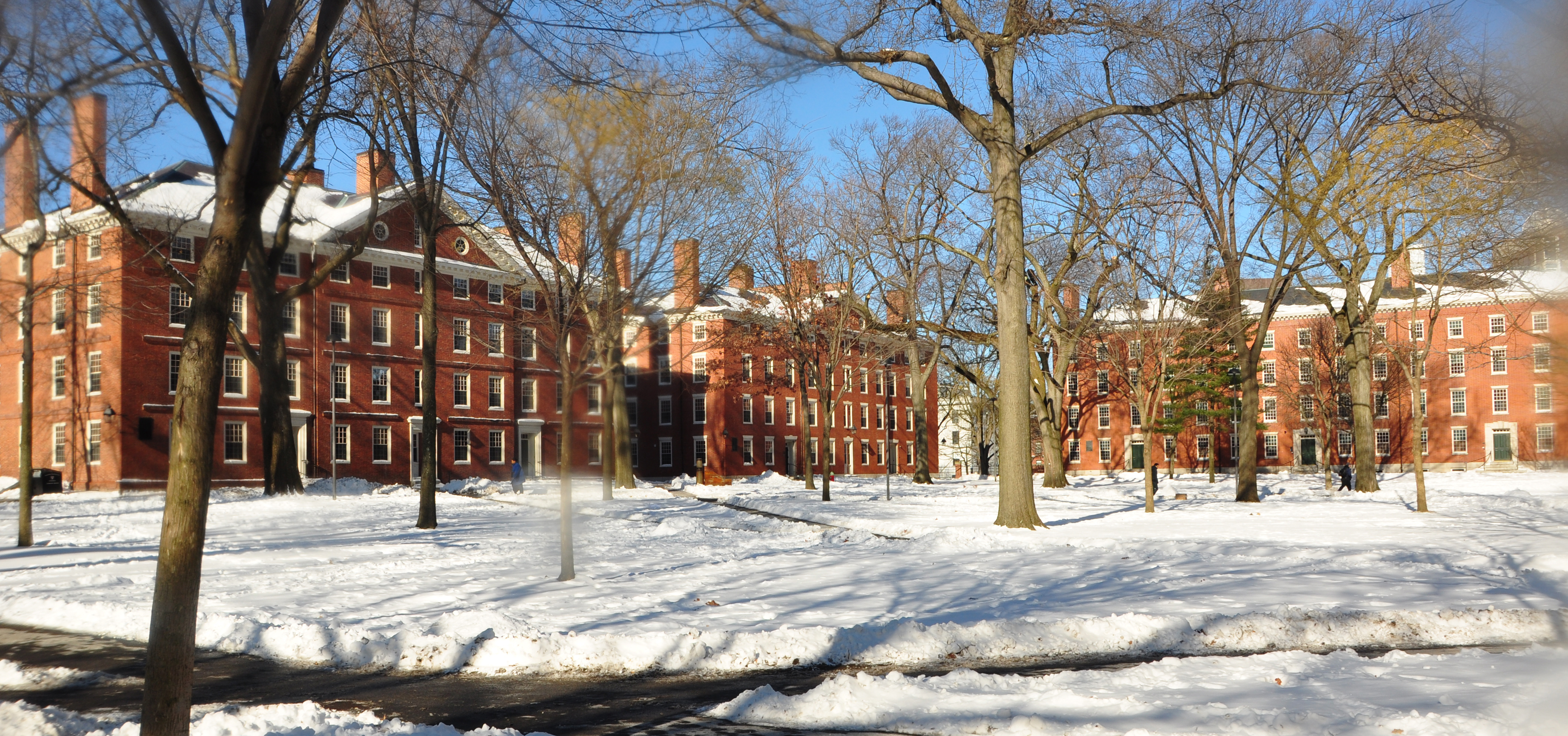
The Yard in winter

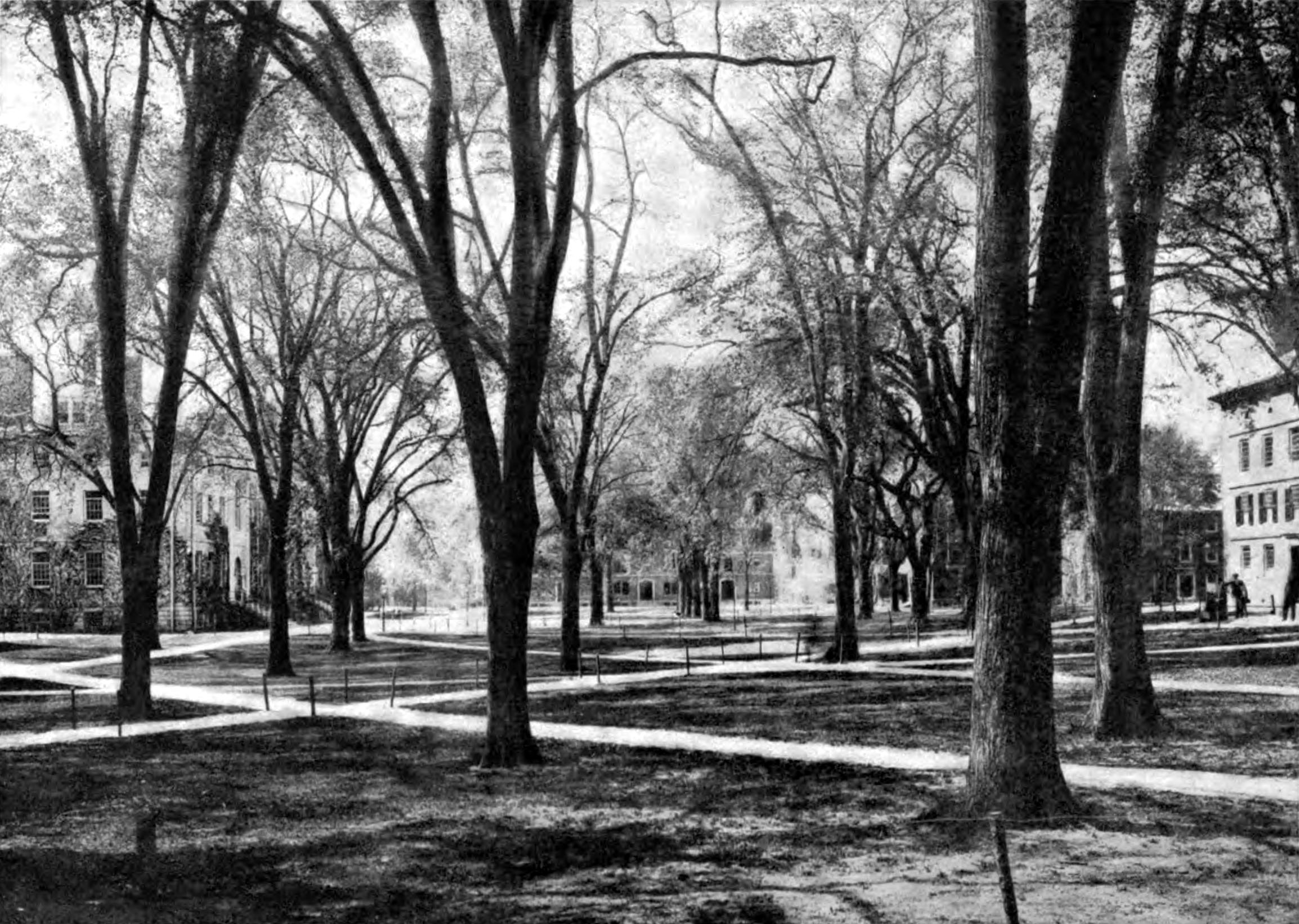
The Yard c. 1920

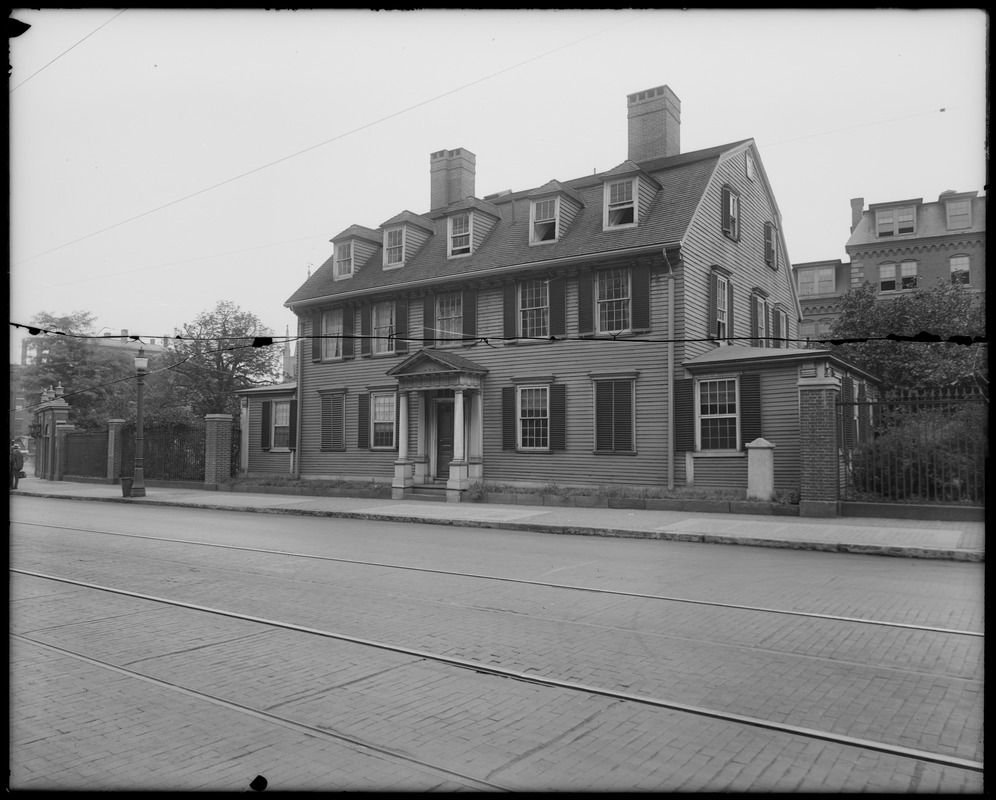
Wadsworth House, August 6, 1920. Boston Public Library, Arts Department.

== See also ==
- National Register of Historic Places listings in Cambridge, Massachusetts
- "Park the car in Harvard Yard"
