= Gates of Harvard Yard =

Gates in Cambridge, Massachusetts, U.S.

Harvard Yard – the oldest part of the Harvard University campus in Cambridge, Massachusetts – is bounded by a perimeter fence punctuated by a series of gates, all built since 1880. (Note: Blair, p. 14)

== Northwest ==
=== Johnston Gate ===
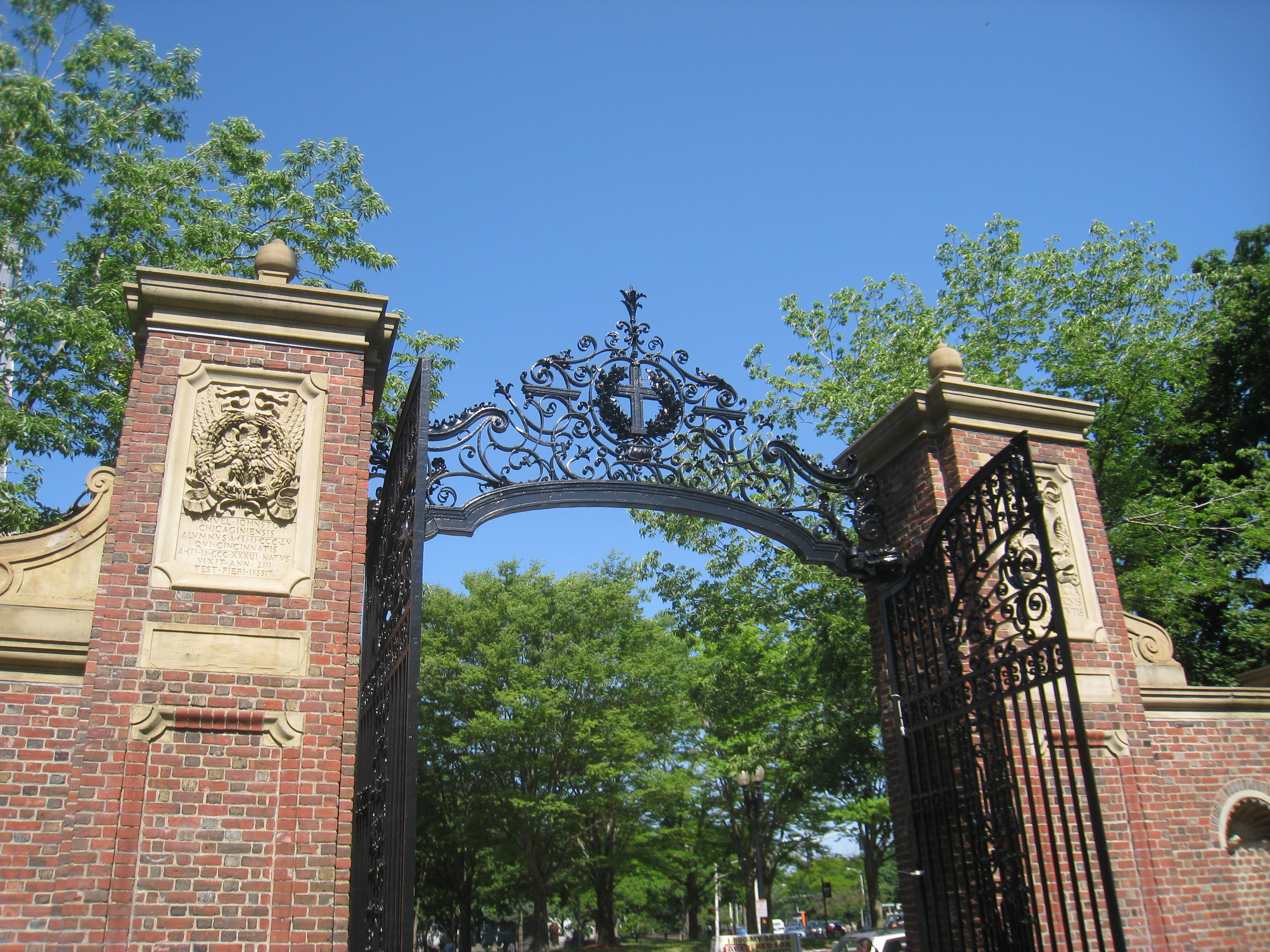
Johnston Gate. The tablet at left reads (in Latin): "Samuel Johnston of Chicago · Graduate in the year 1855 · Who was born in Cincinnati in the year 1833 · Lived 53 years · By his will he ordered this."

The Johnston Gate was completed in 1889 after a Georgian Revival design by McKim, Mead, and White, it opens onto Peabody Street (often mistaken for Massachusetts Avenue, from which Peabody Street diverges nearby) just north of Harvard Square. Costing some $10,000, it was the gift of Samuel Johnston (Harvard College class of 1855). Each Harvard Commencement Day for several hundred years, the sheriffs of Middlesex and Suffolk Counties have arrived at Harvard Yard on horseback, preparatory to the Middlesex Sheriff's ritual calling of the celebrants to order. It has become traditional for them to enter via the Johnston Gate.

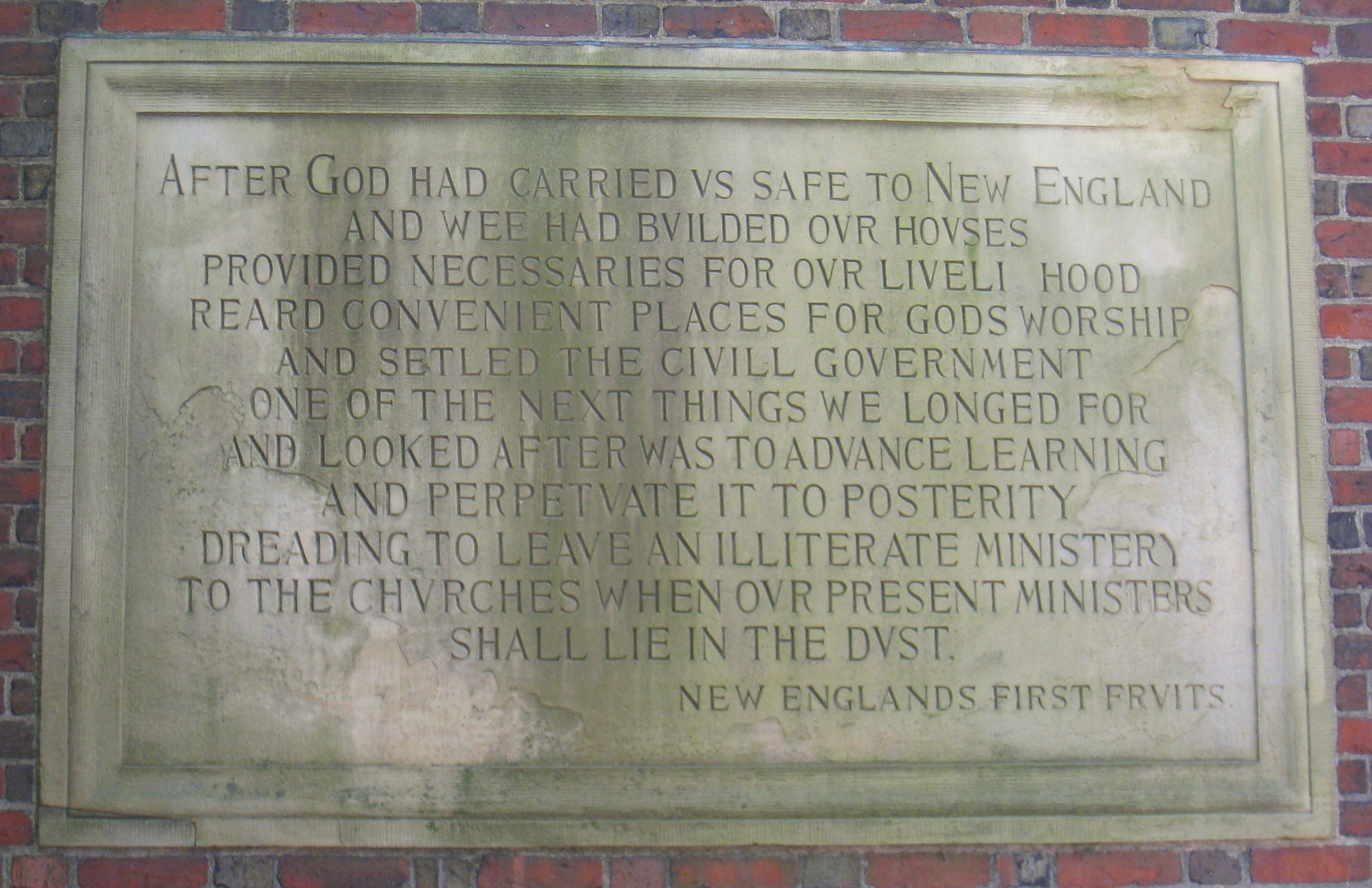
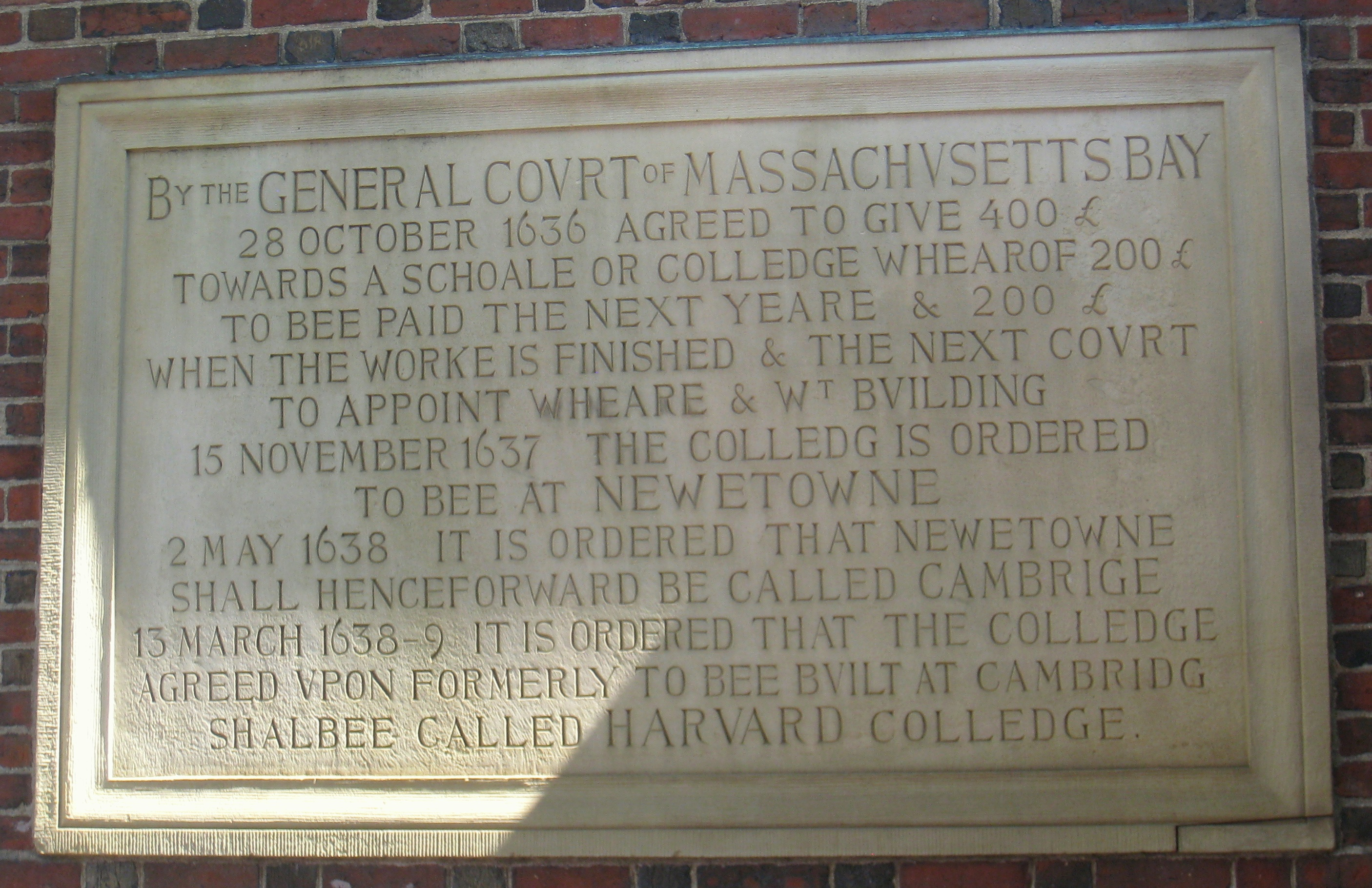
Tablets flanking the gate's exterior

=== Class of 1870 Gate ===
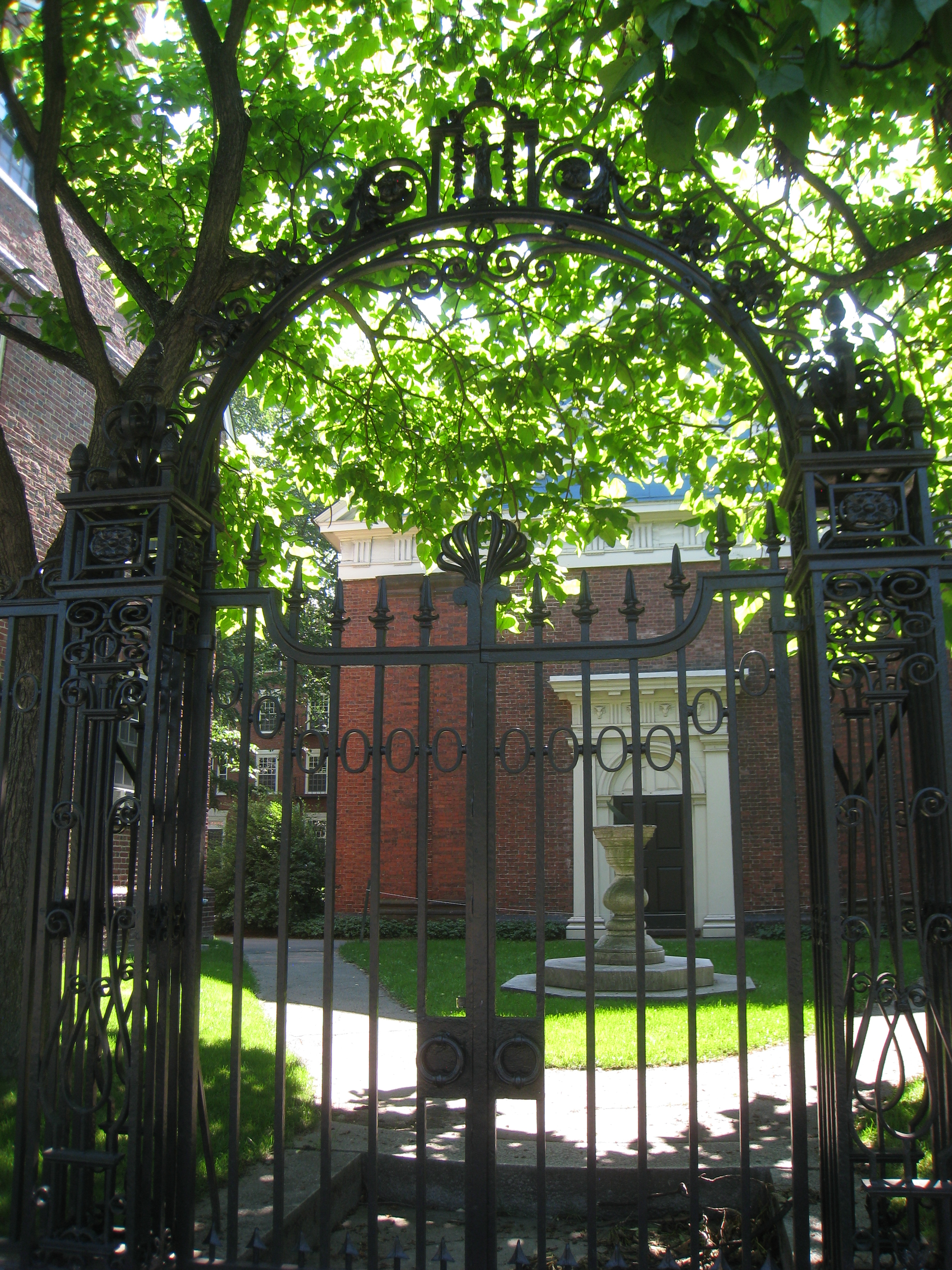
The 1870 Gate (2010)

== North ==
=== Class of 1881 Gate ===
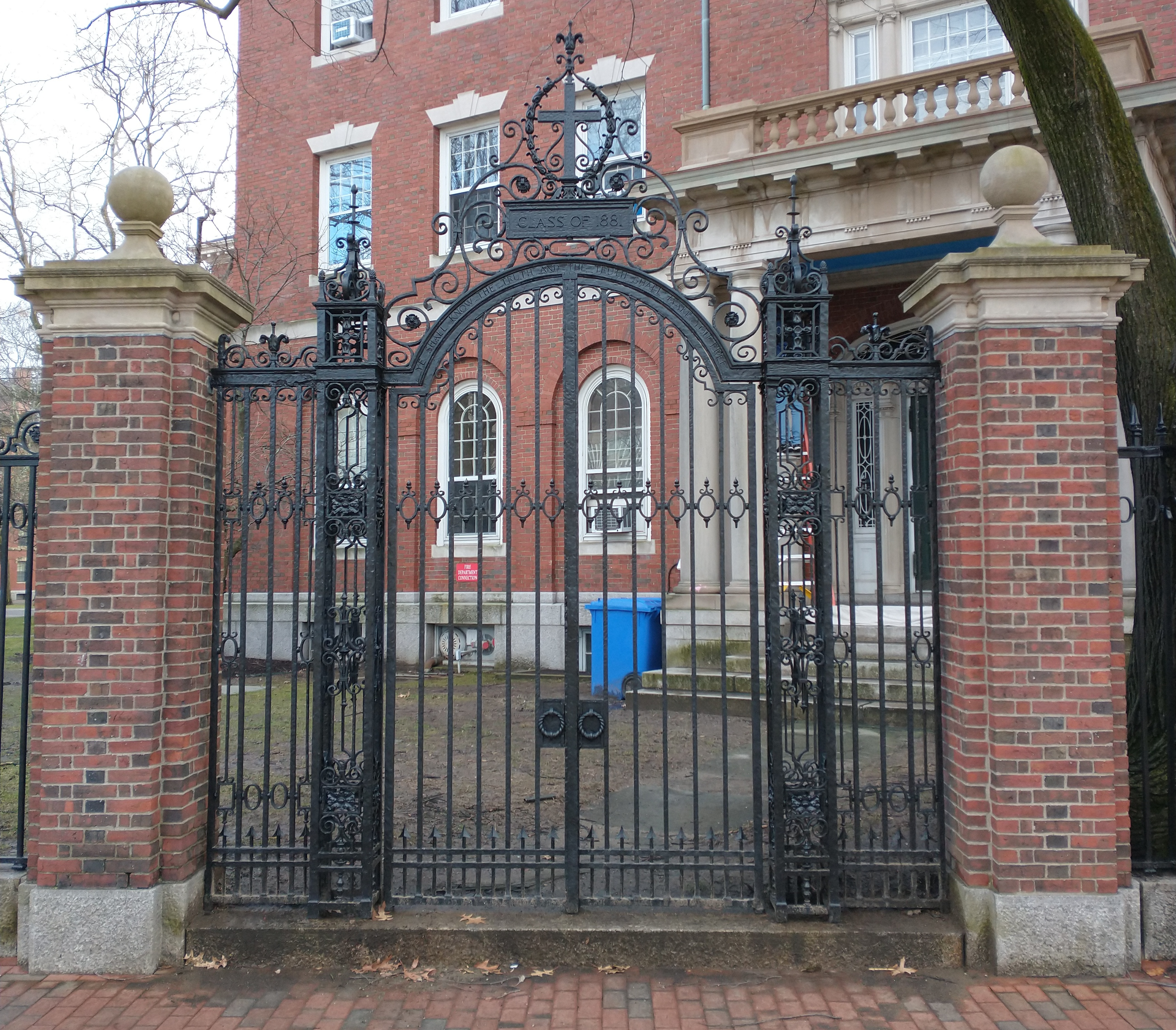
1881 gate

The inscription on the Class of 1881 Gate invites the reader to "come within its gates, in order that in whole-hearted service to the truth, they may enter into life and so be free". It has been locked for many years.

=== Class of 1876 (Holworthy) Gate ===
The Class of 1876 Gate is also known as Holworthy Gate; Holworthy Hall, a freshman dormitory, is immediately inside it. A plaque at its apex reads, "In Memory of Dear Old Times."

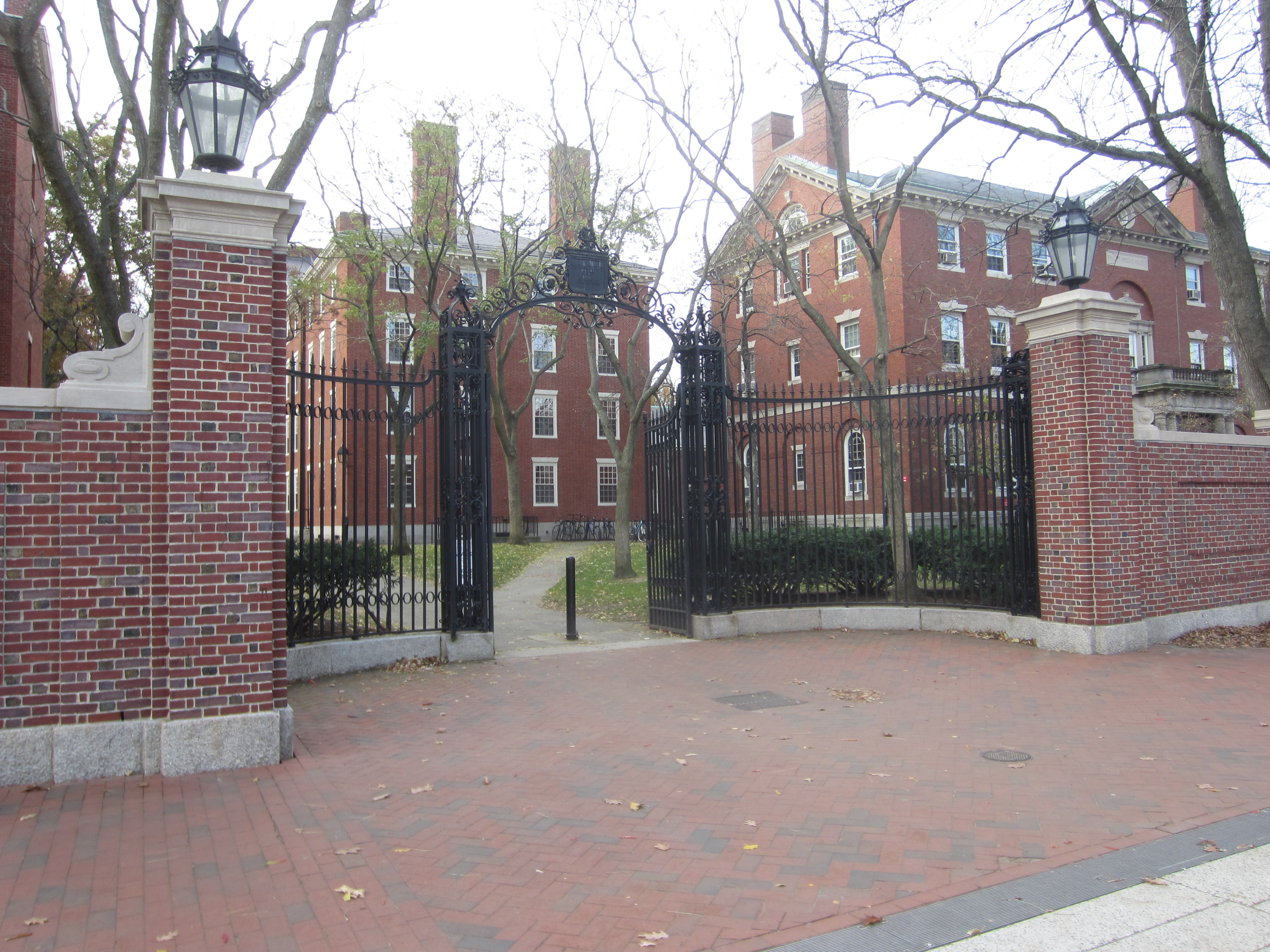
The Holworthy Gate (2019)

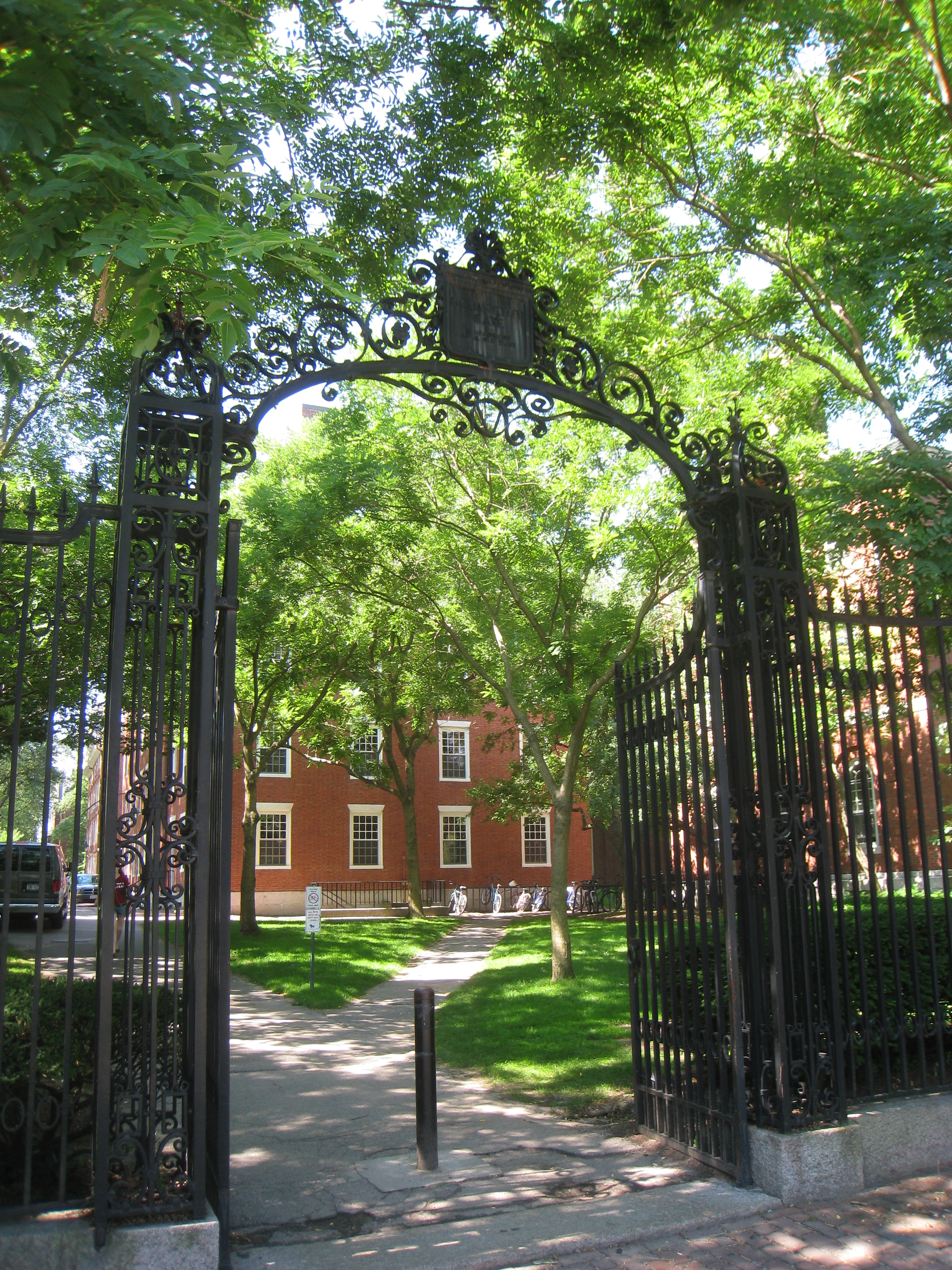
Holworthy gate

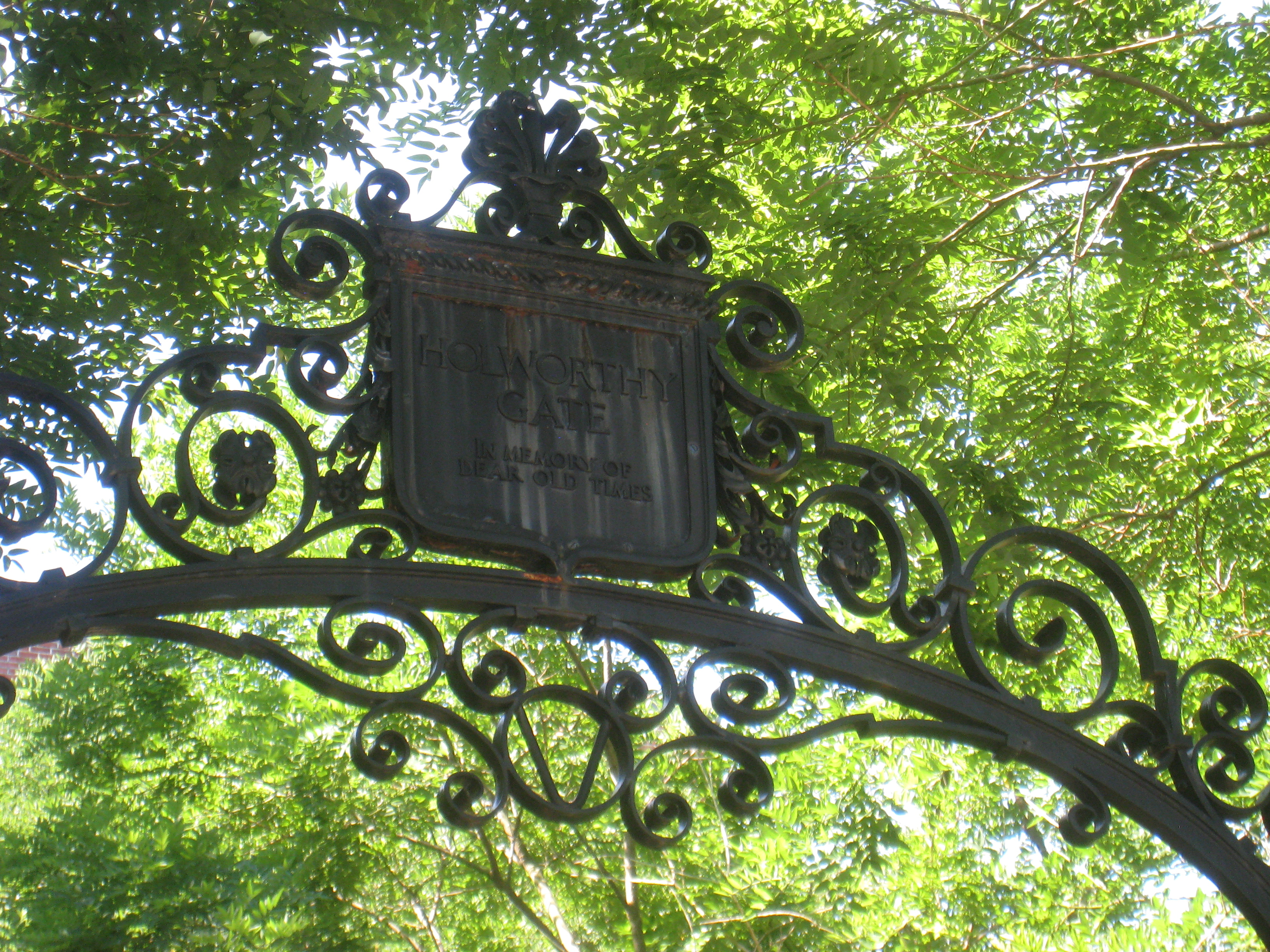
Detail, 2010

=== Class of 1879 (Meyer) Gate ===
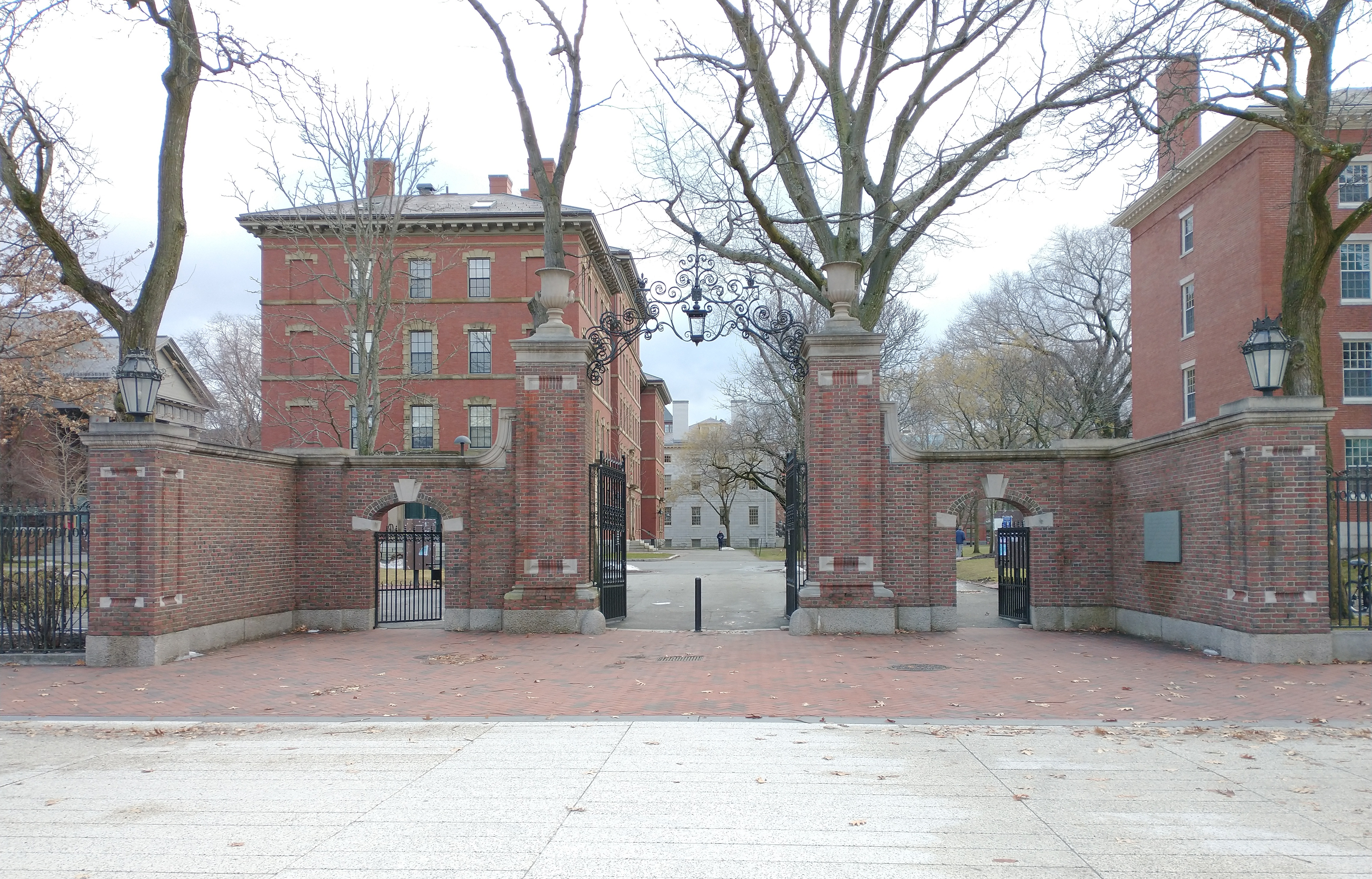
Meyer gate

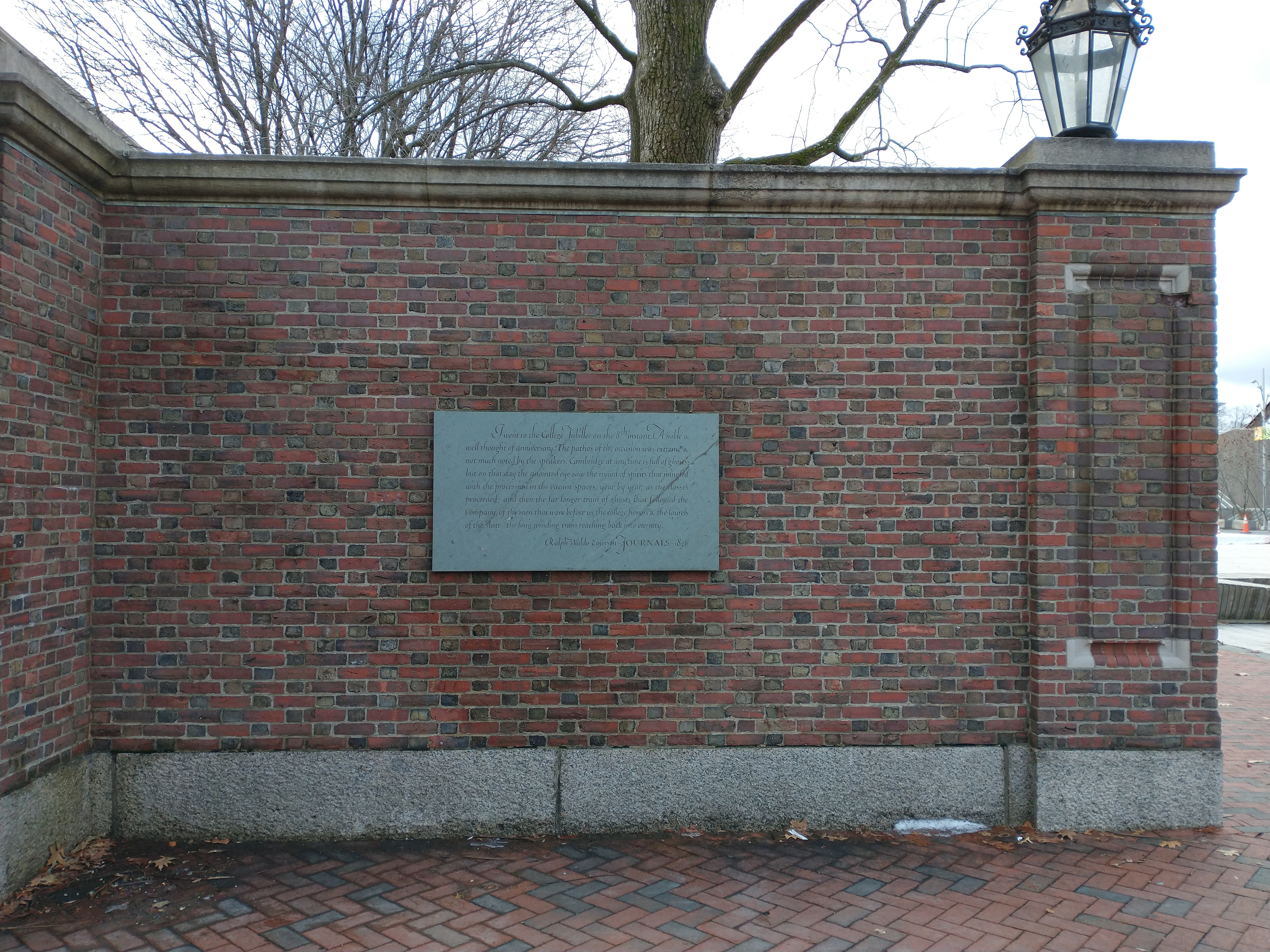
The Ralph Waldo Emerson plaque on the West side of the Meyer gate

Meyer Gate was given by George von Lengerke Meyer in 1901. Like the Holworthy Gate, it connects the Yard to the Science Center Plaza. The words on a plaque set in the gate's brickwork are from Ralph Waldo Emerson's journal for 1836:

I went to the College Jubillee on the 8th instant. A noble & well thought of anniversary. The pathos of the occasion was extreme & not much noted by the speakers. Cambridge at any time is full of ghosts; but on that day the anointed eye saw the crowd of spirits that mingled with the procession in the vacant spaces, year by year, as the classes proceeded; and then the far longer train of ghosts that followed the Company, of the men that wore before us the college honors & the laurels of the state – the long winding train reaching back into eternity.

=== Bradstreet Gate ===
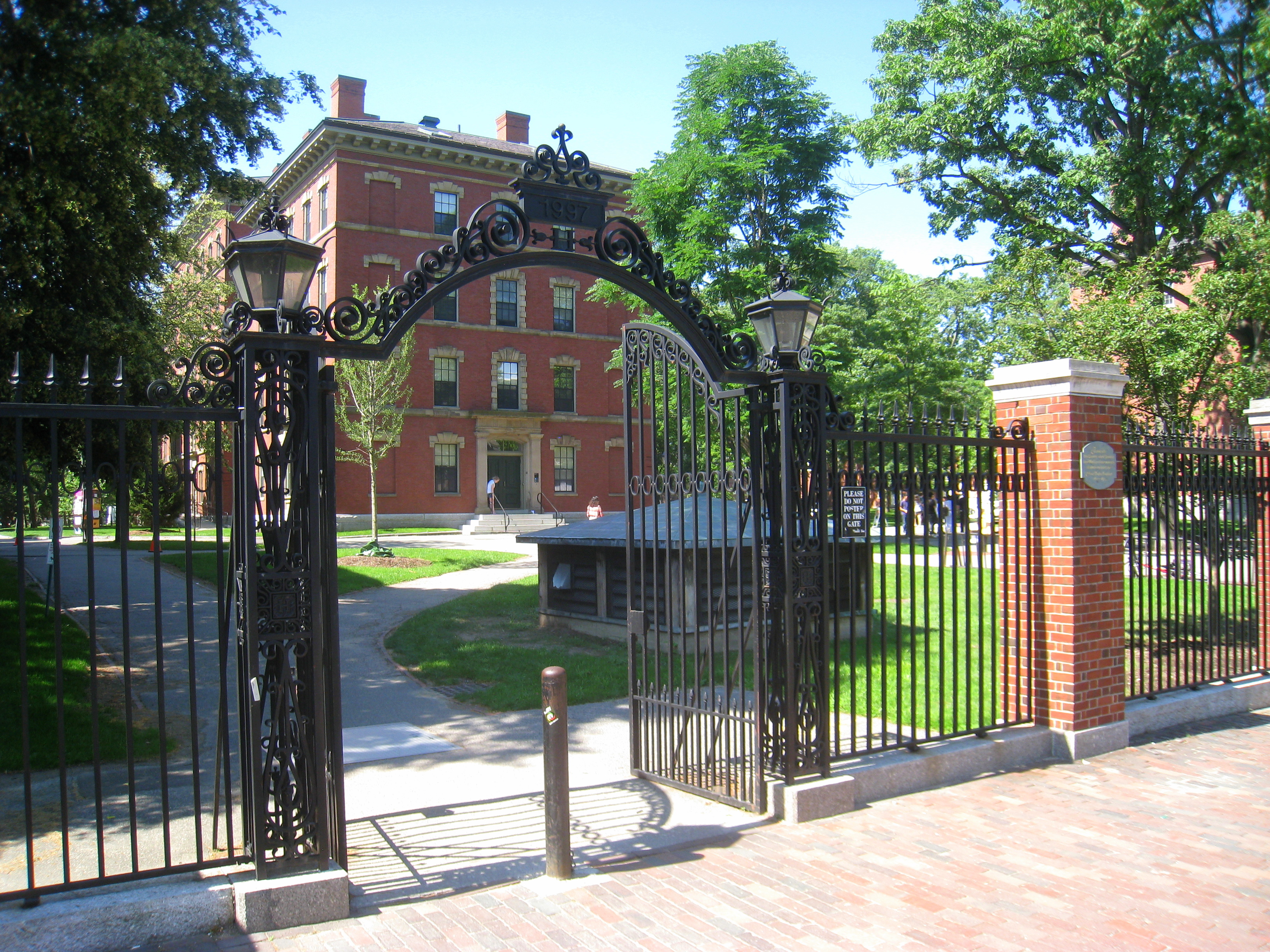
The Bradstreet Gate (2010)

Bradstreet Gate is a wrought-iron gate across Quincy Street and Cambridge Street from Memorial Hall. In 1997 it was dedicated to Anne Bradstreet on the 25th anniversary of female students living in Harvard's freshman dormitories. A plaque with a quote from one of Bradstreet's poems was added in 2003.

=== Classes of 1887 and 1888 Gate ===
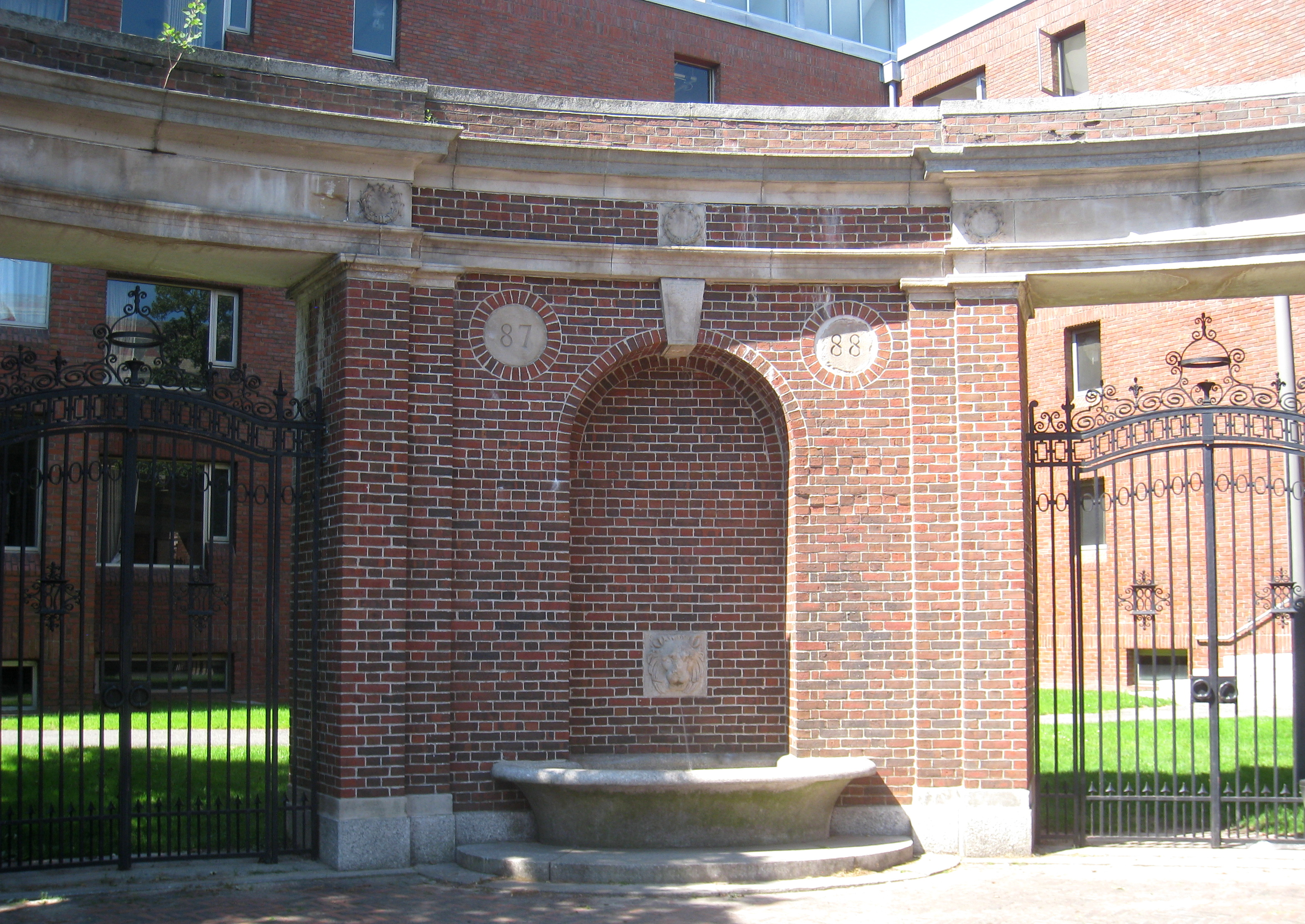
1887 and 1888 Gates (2010)

== South and southwest ==
=== Class of 1877 (Morgan) Gate ===
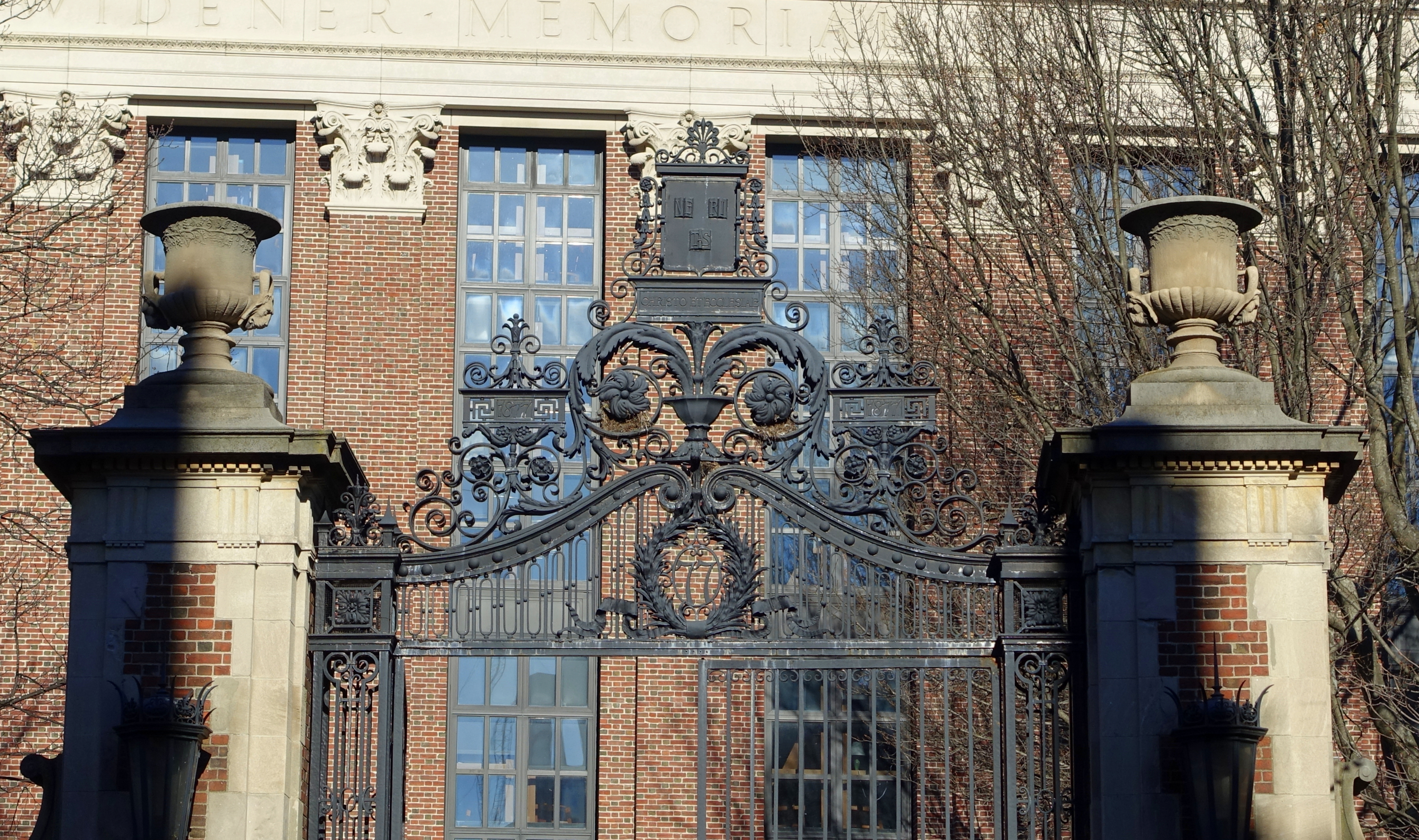
The 1877 Gate, at the rear of Widener Library (2018)

=== Porcellian Club (McKean) Gate ===
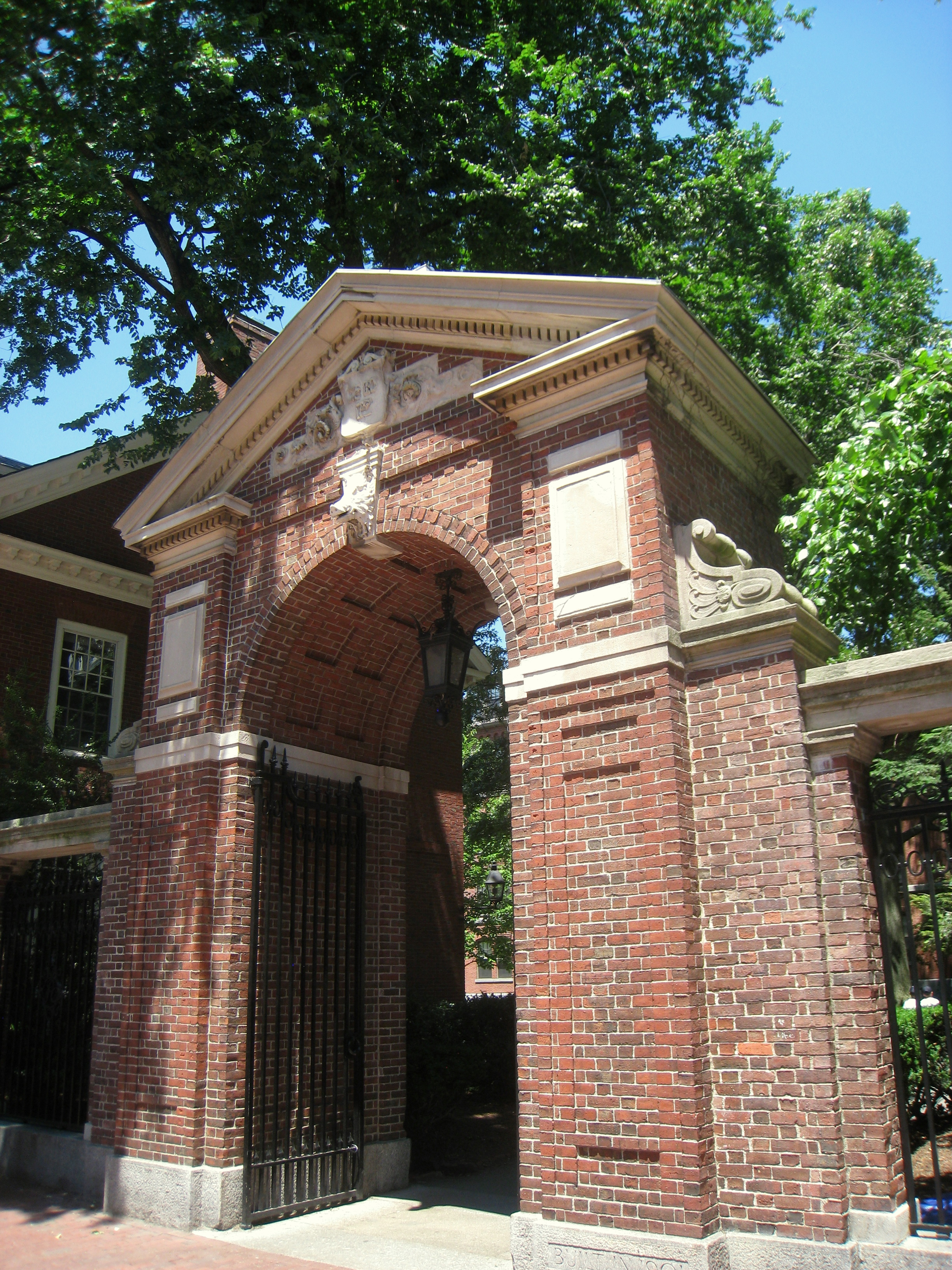
The McKean Gate (2010)

=== Class of 1857 Gate ===
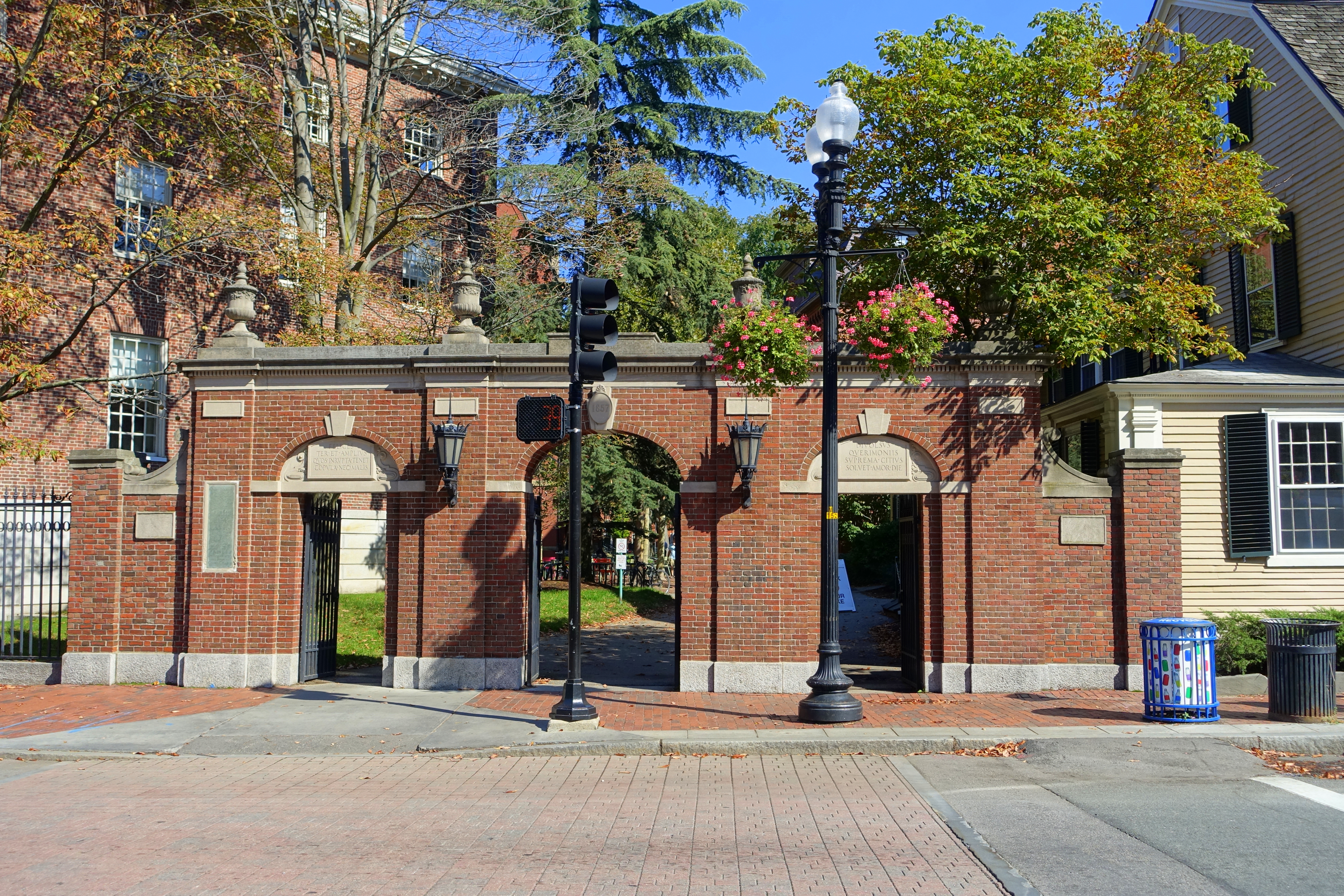
The 1857 Gate (2018)

The 1857 Gate (or Class of 1857 Gate) is a triple-arched gate which Harvard Magazine called "a very touching memorial to the unbroken bonds of friendship that this class had" despite the fact that its members had fought on both sides of the American Civil War. Students on both sides helped fund the gate. It has a Latin inscription from Horace's Odes.

The gate was relocated 40 feet in 1924, and is now positioned along the same axis as the 1876 Gate.
