= Massachusetts Hall (Harvard University) =

- Massachusetts Hall, Harvard University
- U.S. National Register of Historic Places
- U.S. National Historic Landmark
- U.S. Historic district – Contributing property
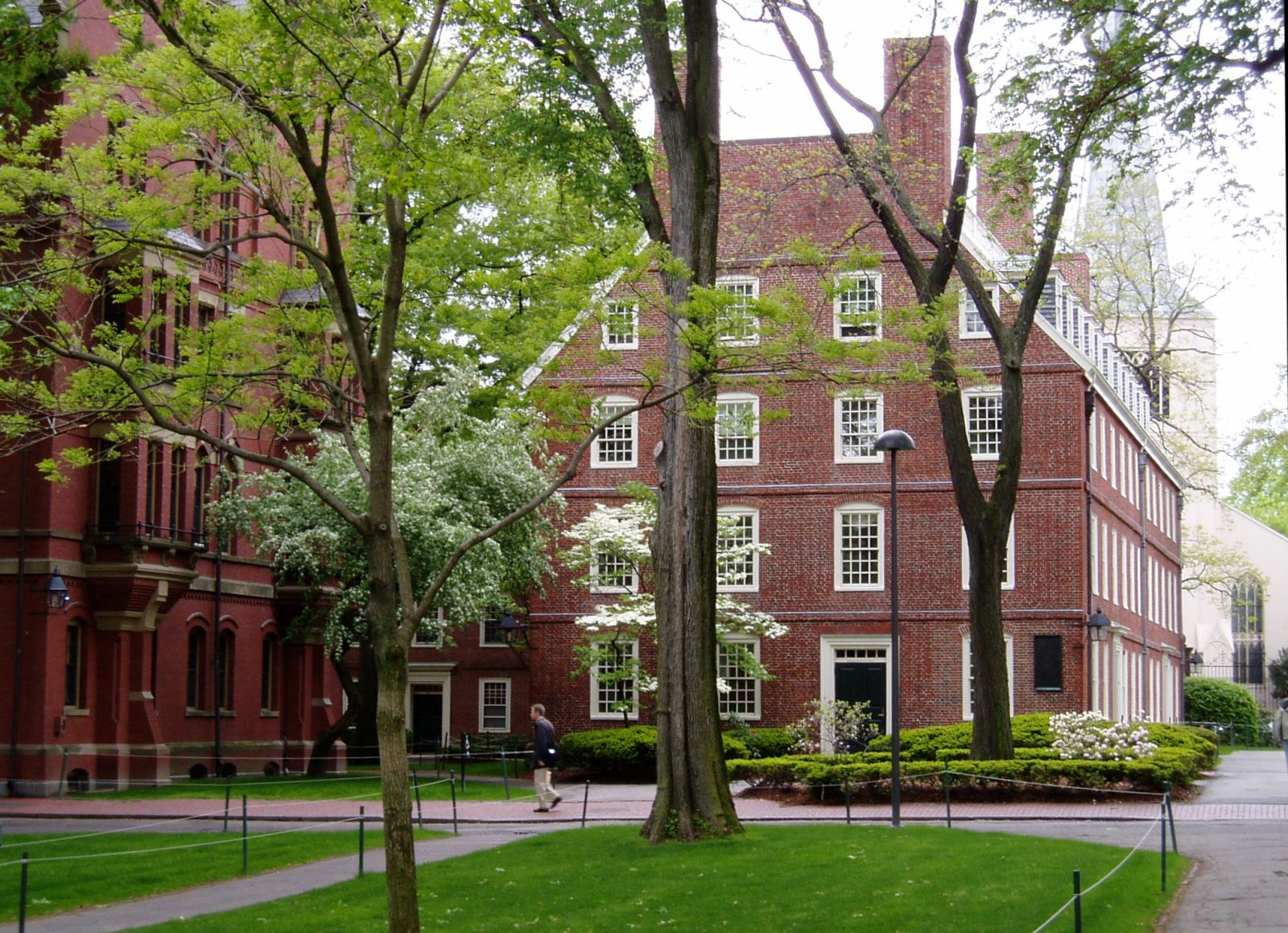
- Massachusetts Hall, May 2005

- Location within Massachusetts Location within the United States
- Location: Cambridge, Massachusetts, U.S.
- Coordinates: 42°22′27.98″N 71°7′5.82″W
- Built: 1718–1720
- Architect: John Leverett
- Architectural style: Georgian
- Part of: Harvard Yard (ID73000287)
- NRHP reference No.: 66000769

Significant dates
- Added to NRHP: October 15, 1966
- Designated NHL: October 9, 1960
- Designated CP: February 6, 1973

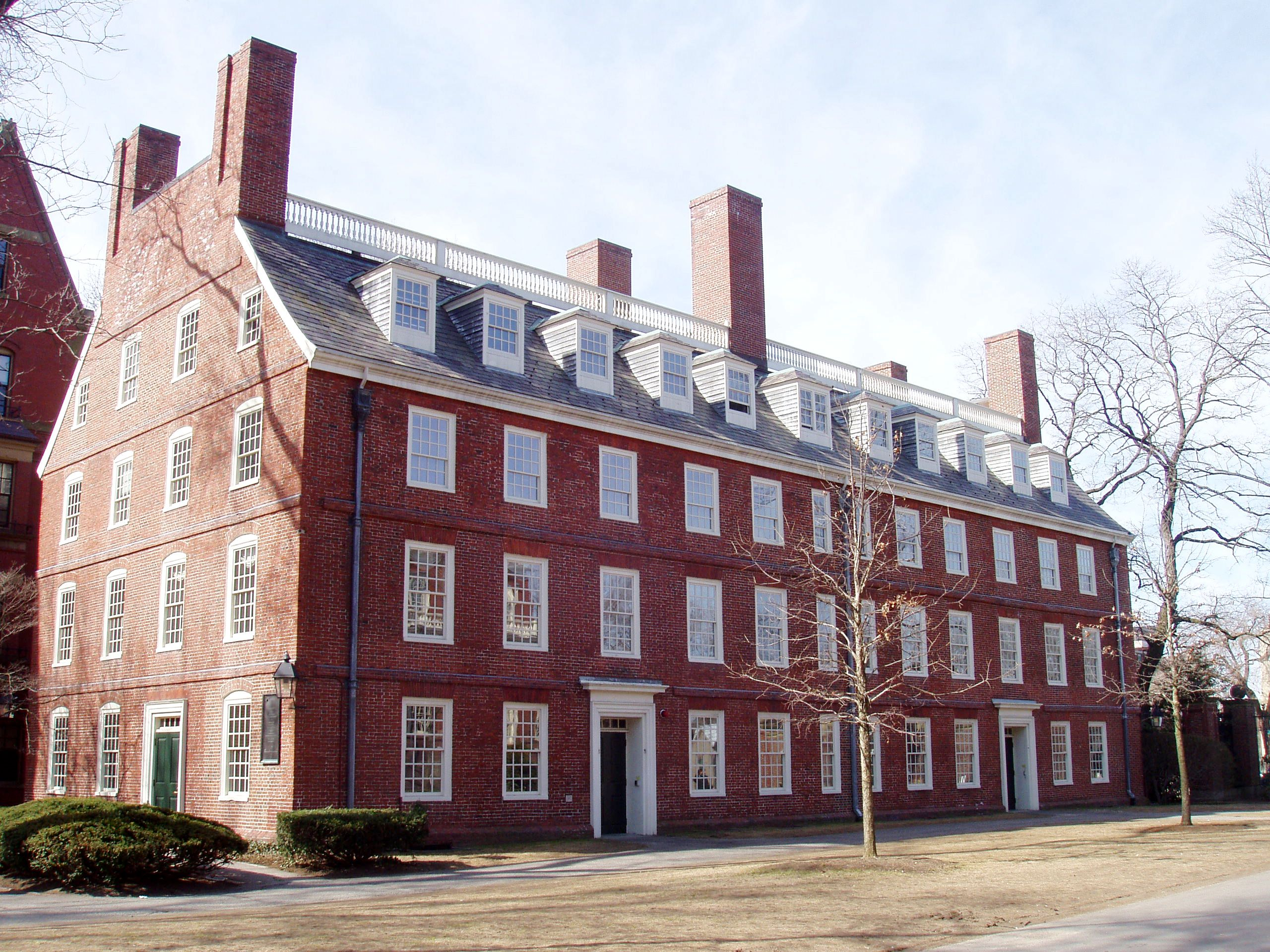
Massachusetts Hall, the oldest surviving building at Harvard College

Massachusetts Hall is the oldest surviving building at Harvard College, the first institution of higher learning in the British colonies in America, and second-oldest academic building in the United States after the Wren Building at the College of William & Mary. The building possesses great significance in the history of American education and in the development of the Thirteen Colonies during the 18th century. The building was constructed between 1718 and 1720.

Massachusetts Hall was designed by Harvard Presidents John Leverett and his successor Benjamin Wadsworth. The building initially was a dormitory, including 32 chambers and 64 small private studies for the 64 students it was designed to house. During the Siege of Boston in the Revolutionary War, 640 American soldiers took quarters in the hall. Much of the interior woodwork and hardware, including brass doorknobs, disappeared at this time.

While designed as a residence for students, the building has served many purposes through the years. After Thomas Hollis donated a quadrant and a 24-foot telescope in 1722, for example, the building housed an informal observatory.

The president of the university, provost, treasurer, and vice presidents have offices that occupy the first two floors and half of the third. Freshmen reside in the fourth floor.

Massachusetts Hall, as Harvard's oldest extant dormitory, has housed many influential people. Founding Fathers who lived in Massachusetts Hall include John Adams, Samuel Adams, Elbridge Gerry, John Hancock, and James Otis. Members of the Wigglesworth, Weld, Thayer, Eliot, and Lowell families (among others), whose names now grace other dormitories, also lived in Massachusetts Hall. More recent notable residents of Massachusetts Hall include Alan Jay Lerner, Elliot Richardson, John Harbison, David Roux, and Jeff Schaffer.

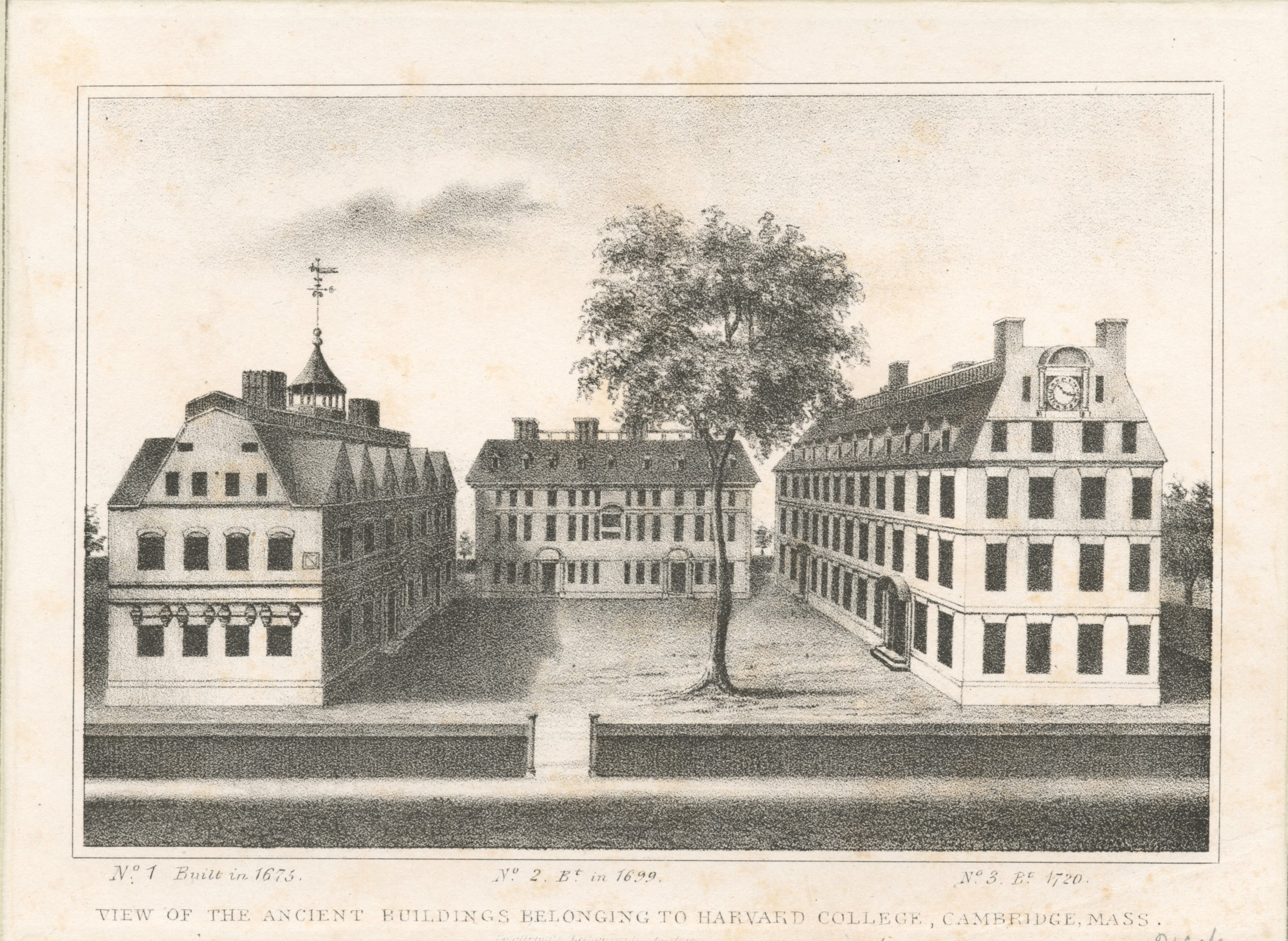
Harvard's buildings during the colonial era, with Massachusetts Hall on the right

== See also ==
- List of National Historic Landmarks in Massachusetts
- National Register of Historic Places listings in Cambridge, Massachusetts
