= Bonnel =

Bonnel is a surname, and may refer to:

- Éric Bonnel (born 1974), French weightlifter
- Ferdinand Bonnel (1865–1945), French-born Sri Lankan Jesuit priest and educator
- Johnny Bonnel (born 1967), American punk rock singer
- Joseph Bonnel (1939–2018), French former football midfielder
- Lionel Bonnel (born 1966), French ski mountaineer
- Lorna Bonnel (born 1986), French ski mountaineer
- Ulane Bonnel (1918–2006), American naval historian

== See also ==
- Bonel
- Bonnell (disambiguation)
- Bonnelly
