= Bonella =

Bonella is an Australian surname. Notable people with the surname include:

- Jim Bonella (1884–1918), Australian rules footballer
- Rod Bonella (1937–2000), Australian long-distance runner and horse trainer

== See also ==
- Bonelli
- Bonilla
- Gonella
