= Bunnell =

Bunnell may refer to:

== Companies ==
- Bunnell Incorporated, American medical equipment manufacturer
- Lambert & Bunnell, American former architectural firm

== People ==
- Bunnell (surname)
- Bunnell Lewis (1824–1908), English archaeologist
- Elizabeth Bunnell Read, (1832–1909), American journalist and woman suffragist
- John Bunnell Davis (1780–1824), English physician
- Romania B. Pratt Penrose (1839–1932; second name Bunnell), American doctor, feminist, mission president, missionary, physician, pioneer and suffragist
- Wallace B. Smith (1929–2023; middle name Bunnell), American Prophet-President of the Community of Christ

== Places ==
- Bunnell, Florida, United States
- Bunnell Point, a mountain in California
- Bunnell Run, a stream in West Virginia
- Frank Scott Bunnell High School, Stratford, Connecticut, USA
- Stephen and Mary Bunnell House, former house in Orem, Utah
- Willard Bunnell House, historic house museum in Homer, Minnesota

== See also ==
- Bonnell (disambiguation)
