= Robert Sinclair Knox =

Decorated British soldier from Northern Ireland

- Born: 2 March 1881; Ballyrashane, County Londonderry, Ireland
- Died: 25 January 1963 (aged 81)
- Military career
- Allegiance: United Kingdom
- Branch: British Army
- Rank: Lieutenant Colonel
- Commands: 9th Battalion, Royal Inniskilling Fusiliers (1918); 10th (Service) Battalion, Royal Inniskilling Fusiliers (1917)
- Conflicts: First World War: Third Battle of Ypres; Battle of Cambrai; Second World War
- Awards: Companion of the Distinguished Service Order & Three Bars; Mentioned in Despatches; Croix de guerre (France)

Robert Sinclair Knox, DSO & Three Bars, DL (2 March 1881 – 25 January 1963) was an Irish-born officer in the Royal Inniskilling Fusiliers in the First World War. He was one of seven British officers to be appointed a Companion of the Distinguished Service Order (DSO) with three bars during the conflict.

== Early life ==
Knox was born in Ballyrashane, County Londonderry, the son of William John Knox and Nancy MacAfee. After being educated in Ballymoney, he worked in Coleraine. He was an Ulsterman associated with the North Derry Regiment of the Ulster Volunteers.

Knox married Ivy Lynch.

== First World War ==
When the First World War broke out, Knox volunteered to serve in the 10th Battalion of the Royal Inniskilling Fusiliers (the Derry Volunteers), formed with other Irish volunteers into the 109th Brigade of the 36th (Ulster) Division. He arrived in France in October 1915 and Knox became major in June 1916

Knox's appointment as a Companion of the Distinguished Service Order (DSO) was gazetted on 1 January 1917. He was also wounded, and Mentioned in Despatches. He saw action at the Third Battle of Ypres and the Battle of Cambrai. He was awarded the first Bar to his DSO on 18 February 1918. with the citation published on 16 July 1918

Knox commanded the 10th (Service) Battalion of the Royal Inniskilling Fusiliers in 1917, and then the 9th Battalion in 1918. The 10th (Derry) and 11th (Donegal and Fermanagh) Battalions of the Royal Inniskilling Fusiliers were disbanded in February 1918 and the officers and men were absorbed into the 1st and 2nd Battalions. Both joined the 9th (Tyrone) Battalion in the 109th Brigade. The Brigade faced the German spring offensive near Saint-Quentin on 21 March 1918, suffering heavy casualties, and was subsequently formed into a composite battalion commanded by Major Knox. He received a second Bar to his DSO, gazetted on 13 September 1918.

Knox took command of the 9th Battalion in April 1918, and a third Bar to his DSO was gazetted on 7 March 1919. Two other officers were awarded a third bar at the same time, Archibald Walter Buckle and W.R.A. Dawson.

Knox was demobilised in February 1919, retaining the rank of lieutenant colonel. An award of the French Croix de guerre was gazetted on 23 June 1919.

== Later life ==
Knox became Deputy Lieutenant for County Londonderry in August 1938. He was also chairman of the Coleraine harbour commissioners, and a director at Hugh T Barrie, a business which sold and exported potatoes and other produce. He served as a lieutenant colonel in the Royal Engineers in Second World War, finally retiring in 1949.

Knox's medal group was sold at Spink and Son in December 1997.
