= Bunnell (surname) =

Bunnell is a surname. Notable people with the surname include:

- Charles Bunnell (disambiguation), several people
- David Bunnell (1947–2016), American technology entrepreneur
- Dewey Bunnell (born 1951), American musician and member of the band America
- Frank C. Bunnell (1842–1911), United States Army soldier and Congressman from Pennsylvania
- Jesse H. Bunnell (1843–1899), American inventor and telegraphist
- John Bunnell (born 1944), American television personality and former law enforcement officer
- John Bunnell, a founder of Dragon Con
- Lafayette Bunnell (1824–1903), American explorer and surgeon
- Omar B. Bunnell (1912–1992), American businessperson and politician
- Peter Bunnell (1937–2021), American author, curator and historian of photography
