= Bonelli =

Bonelli is an Italian surname. Notable people with the surname include:

- Angelo Bonelli – Italian politician
- Antonia Paula de la Resurreccion Bonelly (1786–1870), colonial woman of East Florida
- Aurelio Bonelli (c.1569 – after 1620), Italian composer, organist and painter
- Camillo Bonelli, Captain Regent of San Marino
- Carlo Bonelli (1612–1676), Italian cardinal
- Eduardo Iturrizaga Bonelli (born 1989), Venezuelan chess player
- Ernie Bonelli (1919–2009), American football player
- Federico Bonelli, Italian ballet dancer
- Franco Andrea Bonelli (1784–1830), Italian zoologist
- Frank G. Bonelli (1906–1972), Los Angeles County Supervisor
- Gian Luigi Bonelli (1908–2001), Italian comics writer
- Innocenzo Bonelli, Captain-General of San Marino
- Jim Bonelli (1884–1918), Australian rules footballer
- Luigi Bonelli (1892–1954), Italian playwright and screenwriter
- Maria Luisa Righini-Bonelli (1917–1981), Italian science historian and educator
- Michele Bonelli (1541–1598), Italian cardinal
- Olivia Bonelli (1920–1990), American soprano
- Raphael M. Bonelli, Austrian psychiatrist and researcher
- Richard Bonelli, American baritone
- Sergio Bonelli (1932–2011), Italian comics writer
- William G. Bonelli (1895–1970), American politician

== See also ==
- Binelli, surname
- Bonelli Landing, Lake Mead
- Matthew Bonnellus (Matteo Bonello), 12th century Norman knight in Sicily
- Bonnell (name)
