= Bonnell =

Bonnell may refer to:

- Bonnell (name)
- Bonnell, Indiana, United States
- Mount Bonnell, a prominent point alongside Lake Austin in Austin, Texas
- Bonnell (microarchitecture), used in Intel Atom processors

== See also ==
- Bonel
- Bonnel
- Bunnell (disambiguation)
