= Étaples Military Cemetery =

Cemetery located in Pas-de-Calais, in France

- Commonwealth War Graves Commission
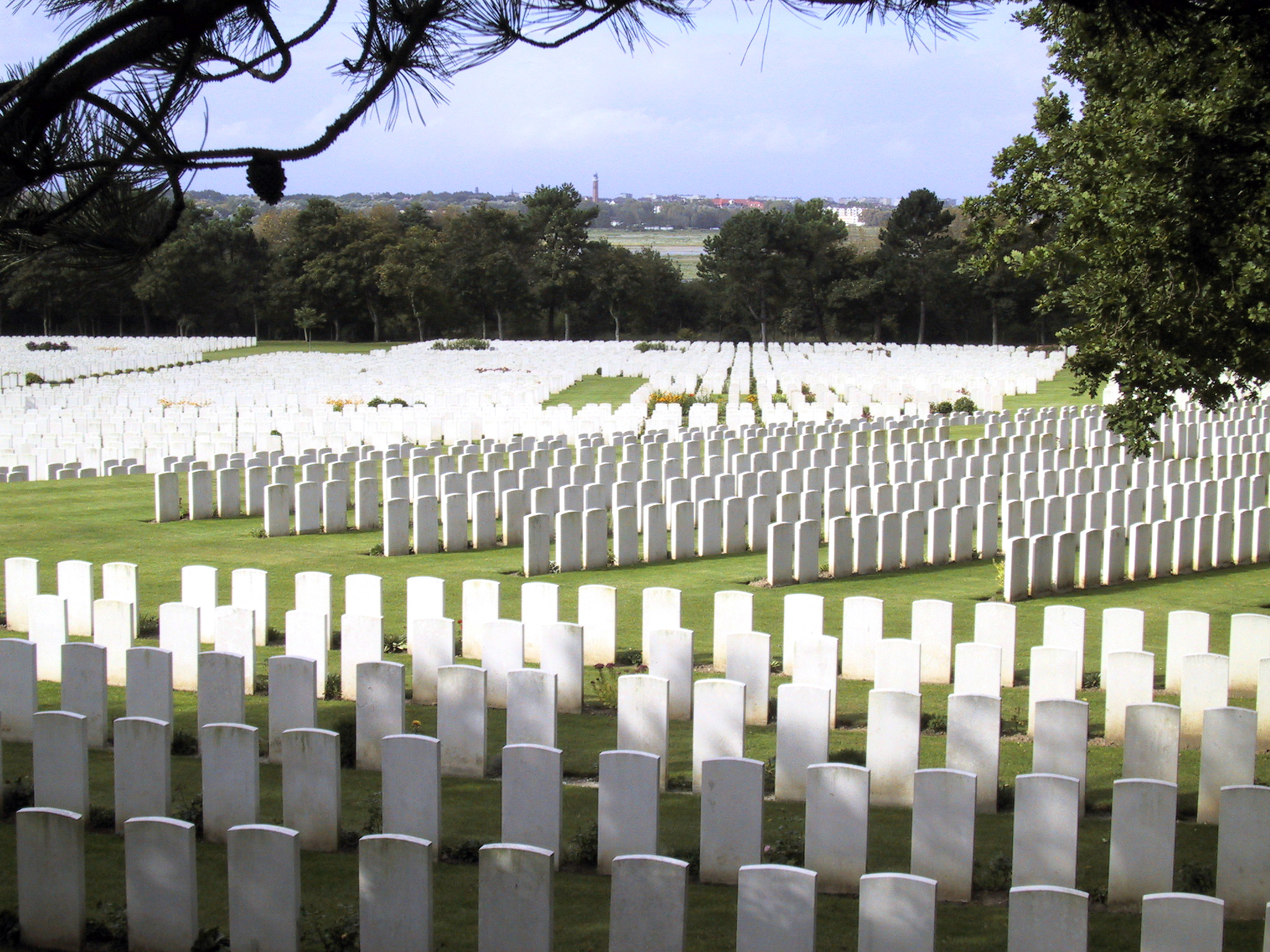
- Used for those deceased 1914-18, 1940
- Location: 50°32′07″N 1°37′21″E near Étaples, Pas-de-Calais
- Designed by: Sir Edwin Lutyens
- Total burials: Over 11,500
- Unknowns: 73

Burials by nation
- UK – 8819; Canada – 1145; Australia – 464; New Zealand – 260; South Africa – 68; India – 17; Germany – 658

Burials by war
- First World War – 10773; Second World War – 119

UNESCO World Heritage Site
- Official name: Funerary and memory sites of the First World War (Western Front)
- Type: Cultural
- Criteria: i, ii, vi
- Designated: 2023 (45th session)
- Reference no.: 1567-PC13

Étaples Military Cemetery is a Commonwealth War Graves Commission cemetery in Étaples, near Boulogne on the north-west coast of France. The cemetery holds over 11,500 dead from both World War I and World War II.

== History ==
Étaples was the scene of much Allied activity during World War I due to its safety from attack by enemy land forces and the existence of railway connections with both the northern and southern battlefields. The town was home to 16 hospitals and a convalescent depot, in addition to a number of reinforcement camps for Commonwealth soldiers and general barracks for the French Army. Of more than 11,500 soldiers interred in Étaples Military Cemetery, over 10,000 of these men were casualties of World War I who died in Étaples or the surrounding area.

The abundance of military infrastructure in Étaples gave the town a capacity of around 100,000 troops in World War I and made the area a serious target for German aerial bombing raids, from which the town suffered heavily. The combination of withstanding these attacks and giving over their homes to the war effort led to Étaples being awarded the Croix de Guerre in 1920.

The Second World War once again saw Allied hospitals stationed in Étaples, and with them the reopening of the cemetery to cope with the casualties of another war. 119 men were buried in Étaples Military Cemetery in World War II, this low number attributable to the fact that the hospitals were only in place from January 1940 until the British withdrawal from the Continent in May of the same year.

== The cemetery ==
Designed by Sir Edwin Lutyens, Étaples Military Cemetery is the largest CWGC cemetery in France, and contains the remains of soldiers from the United Kingdom, Canada, Australia, New Zealand, South Africa, India and Germany. The Commonwealth War Graves Commission has only published the number of Commonwealth and German dead buried in Étaples, although its records for the cemetery note that it contains 'a few war graves of other nationalities'.

In total, the cemetery contains 10,792 Commonwealth burials of which only 73 are unidentified. There are also 658 German burials in the cemetery.

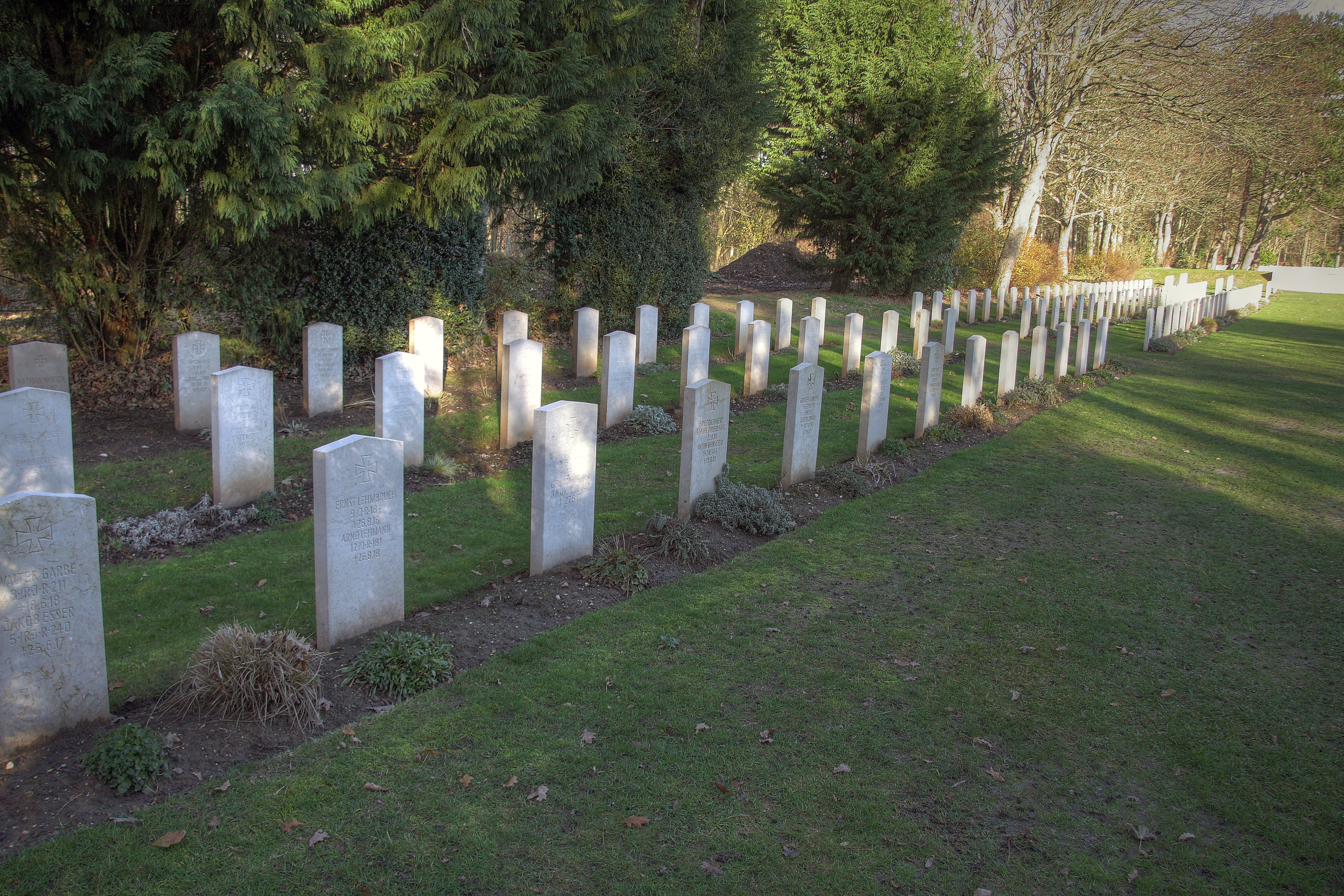
German burials

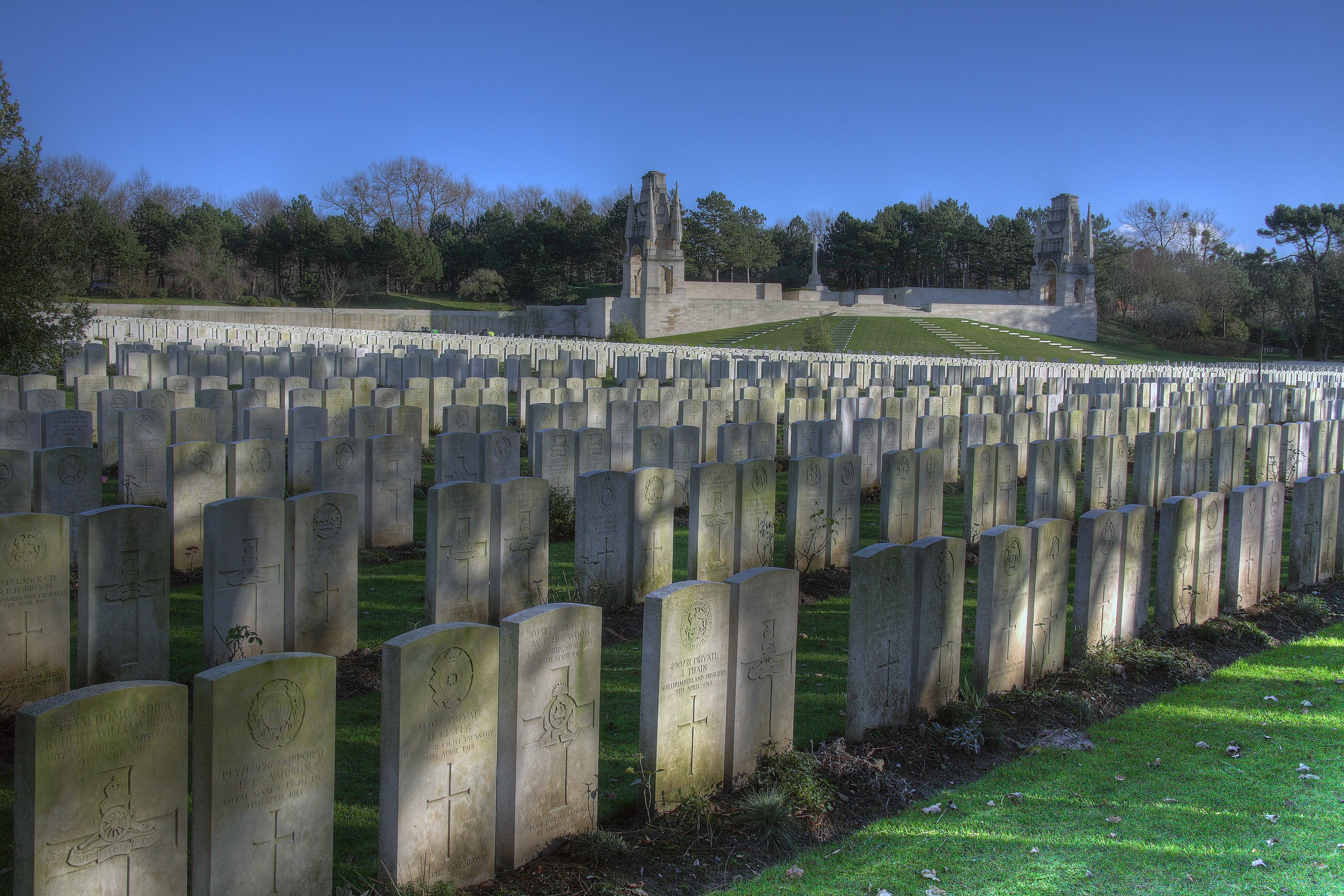
Commonwealth burials

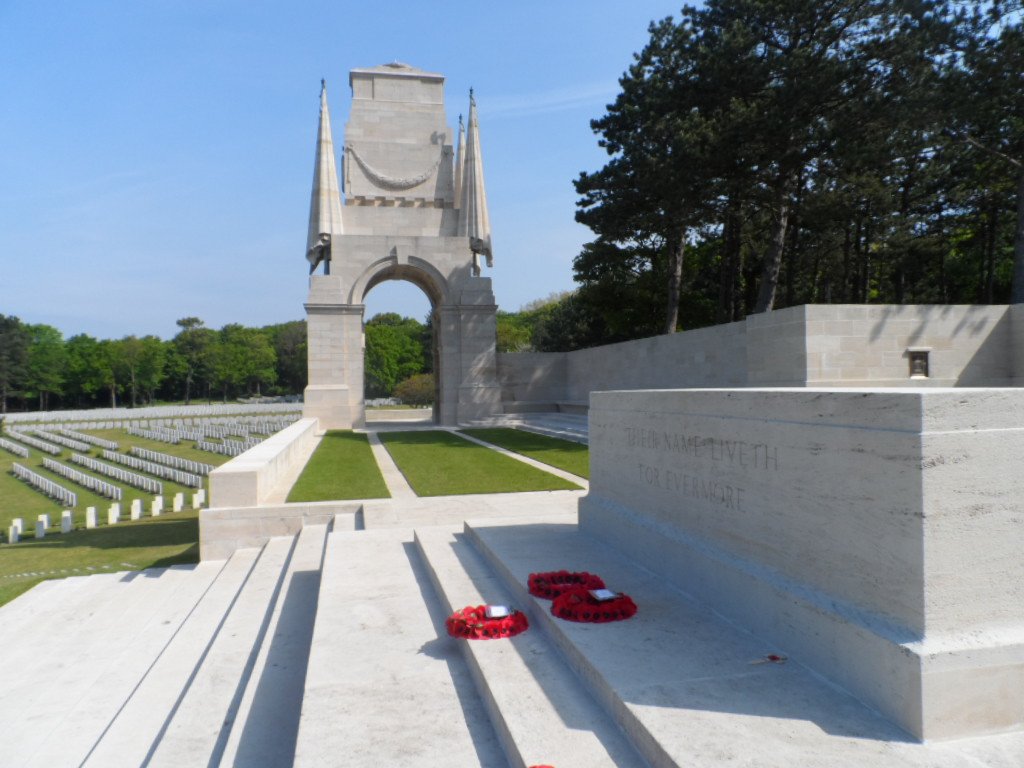
Stone of Remembrance and shelter

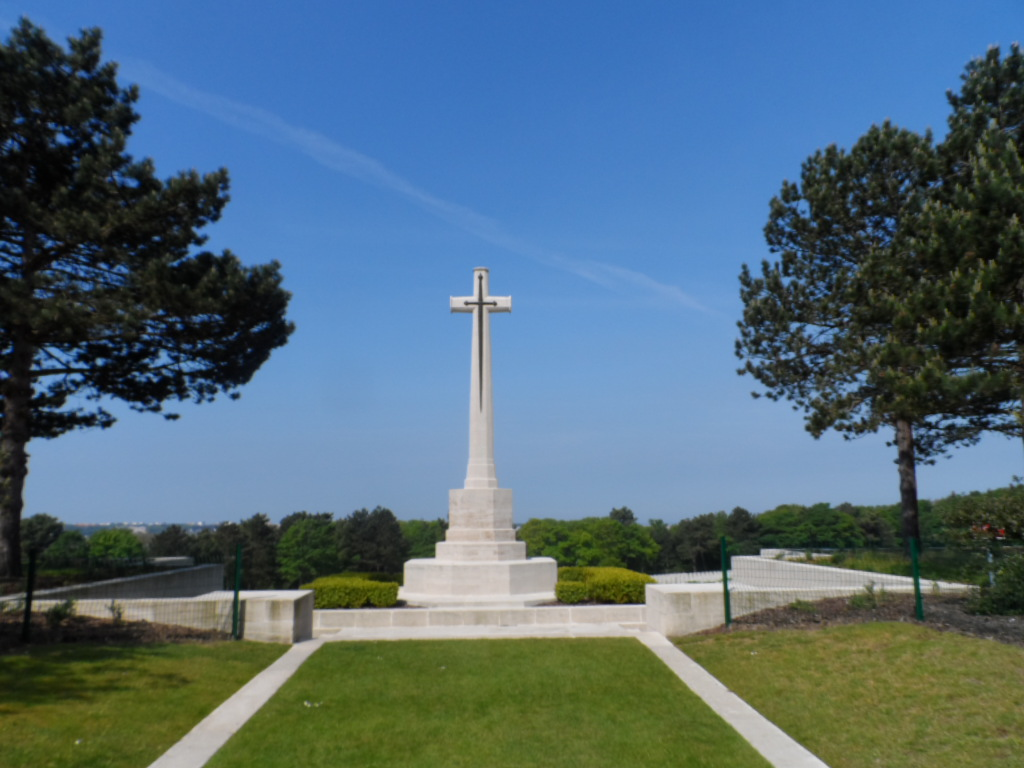
The Cross of Sacrifice

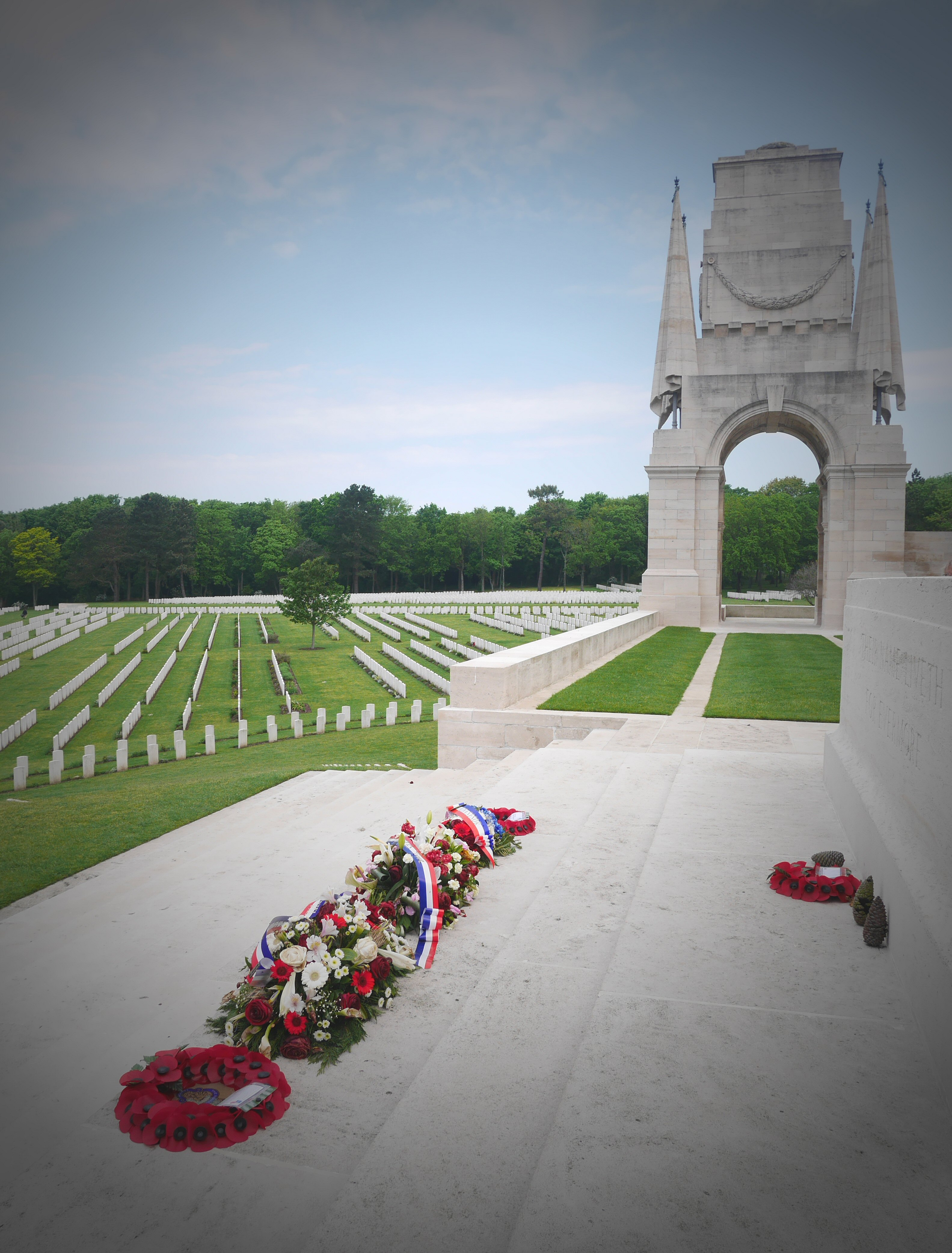
Etaples cemetery, May 2016

== Notable burials ==
Notable burials or memorials include:

- Captain Edward Vivian Birchall, whose philanthropy helped create the National Council for Voluntary Organisations
- Private Jim Bonella, Australian Machine Gun Corps (former Aussie Rules footballer)
- Private Elijah Carey, New Zealand Infantry (former NZ trade unionist)
- Brigadier Edgar William Cox, DSO, FRGS, General Staff.
- Lieutenant Colonel William Robert Aufrere Dawson DSO***, Royal West Kent Regiment
- Captain Noel Forbes Humphreys, Tank Corps, Welsh rugby union footballer
- Private Hugh Kerr, London Scottish, professional soccer player notably for Manchester United
- Nursing Sister Katherine Maud MacDonald, the first Canadian woman to meet her death at the hands of enemy activity. She was killed during a German air raid on the No. 1 Canadian General Hospital at Étaples in May 1918.
- Major Douglas Reynolds, VC, Royal Field Artillery.
- Sergeant Dick Wynn, Labour Corps, professional soccer player notably for Middlesbrough and Everton

== 2003 vandalism ==
In March 2003, vandals protesting against the Anglo-American invasion of Iraq daubed anti-British and anti-American slogans in red paint across parts of the Étaples Military Cemetery. The actions drew widespread condemnation from the United Kingdom, United States, and Australia and from within France itself. The French National Assembly described the vandalism as 'barbaric, monstrous and utterly despicable', while French President Jacques Chirac wrote to the Queen to express his 'sincere regrets'.
