= David Carroll (physicist) =

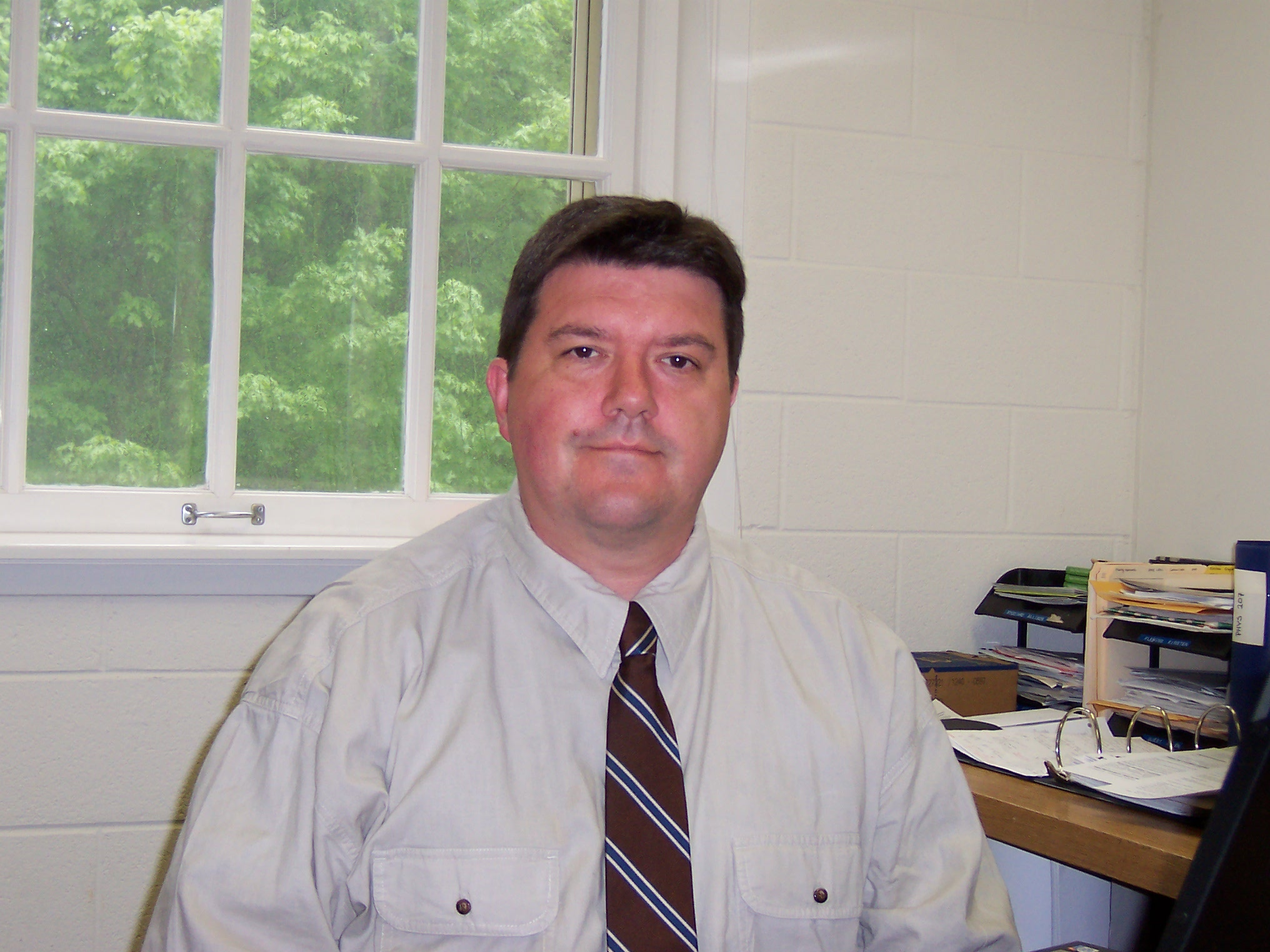
- Carroll in 2003
- Born: January 13, 1963 (age 63)
- Education: North Carolina State University (B.S.); Wesleyan University (PhD); University of Pennsylvania (Postdoctoral); Max-Planck-Insitut für Metallforschung (Research Associate)
- Spouse: Melissa Carroll (2006-Present)
- Children: Lauren Carroll
- Scientific career
- Fields: Physics, Nanotechnology, Materials Science
- Workplaces: Clemson University; Wake Forest University
- Website: http://nanotech.wfu.edu

David Carroll (born January 13, 1963) is a U.S. physicist, materials scientist and nanotechnologist, Fellow of the American Physical Society, and director of the Center for Nanotechnology and Molecular Materials at Wake Forest University. He has contributed to the field of nanoscience and nanotechnology through his work in nanoengineered cancer therapeutics, nanocomposite-based display and lighting technologies, high efficiency nanocomposite photovoltaics and thermo/piezo-electric generators.

== Education ==
Carroll earned his BS (1985) in physics from NC State University (Raleigh, NC) and his PhD (1993) in physics from Wesleyan University in (Middletown, CT) with Dr. Dale Doering (thesis advisor). Carroll's thesis examined the thermodynamics of charged defects in complex oxide materials. As a postdoctoral associate for Professor Dawn Bonnell at the University of Pennsylvania (Philadelphia), Carroll worked on the application of scanning probes to size and dimension related phenomena in oxide supported metal nanoclusters. From there Carroll became a research associate at the Max-Planck-Insitut für Metallforschung (MPI) in Stuttgart, Germany under the direction of Professor Manfred Rühle. His primary research was on nanoscale phenomena at metal-ceramic interfaces using a combination of microscopy techniques.

At the MPI Carroll first began working with carbon nanotubes and their variants. Specifically, Carroll was the first to identify the signature for one-dimensional behavior in multiwalled nanotubes (the so-called van Hove Singularities) as well as the signatures for defect states for those systems. This work helped to open the door to the use of scanning probe spectroscopies in understanding the electronics of low-dimensional systems.

== Research ==
Carroll's research contributions have been in the areas of: Growth and assembly of novel nanostructures, Optics of nanostructures and Nano-photonics, Quantum-functional properties of nanophase blends, Organic material nanocomposite devices and technologies including organic photovoltaics, lighting systems, and IR sensors, Biomedical-nanotechnology including smart therapeutics, hyperthermia approaches to Cancer, advanced/responsive tissue scaffolding technology, and biological-technology signal transduction.

In 1997, Carroll moved to Clemson University (SC) as an assistant professor where he received early promotion and tenure in the department of physics. While at Clemson he established a program in organic devices based upon carbon nanotube nanocomposites demonstrating enhanced lifetime and performance in organic light-emitting diodes (OLED) for the first time. This work was among the first to establish that nanotube-based nanocomposite systems could be used to enhance a variety of organic device performance metrics.

In 2003, Carroll's group moved to Wake Forest University in Winston-Salem, NC to establish the Center for Nanotechnology and Molecular Materials. With this move the research team expanded its work into biomedical nanotechnologies and continued to push the state-of-the-art in performance of organic electronics, announcing the development of highly efficient lighting devices based on field activation of polymers (FIPELs) and fabrics that generate power from body heat in recent years. Carroll's team at the NanoCenter at Wake Forest University was among the first to realize morphology control in organics through the use of heating or multiple solvents setting the world record for the highest efficiency organic solar cells at the time.

Since becoming faculty, Carroll has published over 240 articles in scholarly journals (h-index = 40). He has published 1 textbook: "One Dimensional Metals" and edited two books on nanoelectronics. He holds 44 patents with numerous patent filings. Carroll is a frequent speaker at international conferences with more than 150 invited talks in the past few years. Since 2003, six different spin-off companies have been based on technologies from his labs.

== Personal ==
Prof. Carroll has become a well known speaker on the topic of technology and human society. He has appeared on numerous television and radio programs including the History Channel, CNN, NPR, BBC, and CNBC as well as in newspapers and popular magazines around the world.
