= Lionel de Jersey Harvard =

Descendant of John Harvard (1893–1918)

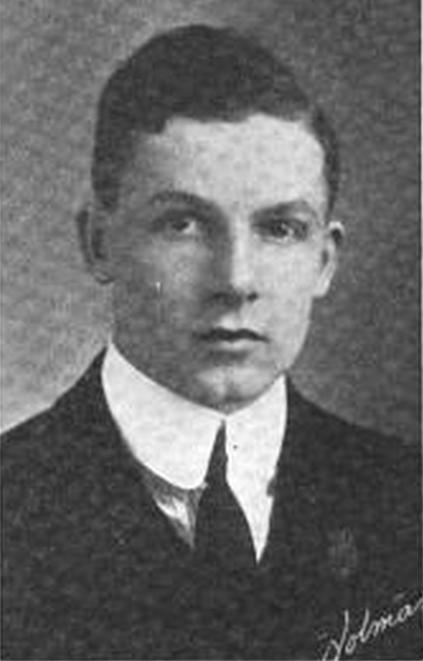
- As a Harvard senior
- Born: 3 June 1893; Lewisham, London
- Died: 30 March 1918 (aged 24); Arras, France
- Cause of death: Killed in action
- Resting place: Boisleux-au-Mont
- Education: Harvard University (BA)
- Known for: The first Harvard to attend Harvard
- Spouse: May (Barker) Harvard
- Children: John Peter de Jersey Harvard
- Parent(s): Thomas Mawson Harvard; Maud de Jersey (Thompson) Harvard
- Relatives: John Eric de J. Harvard (brother, b. & d. 1892) Kenneth O'Gorman Harvard (brother)
- Awards: Boylston Prize; Class poet; Baccalaureate Hymnist

Signature
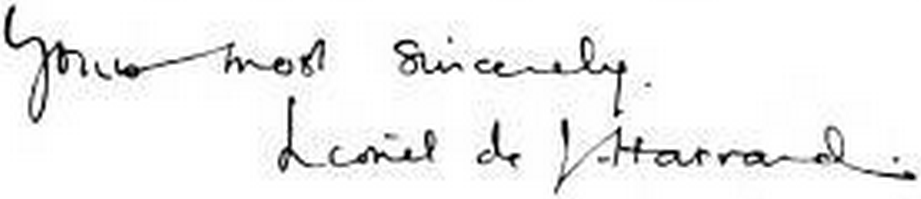

Lionel de Jersey Harvard (3 June 1893 – 30 March 1918) was a young Englishman who, discovered to be collaterally descended from Harvard College founder John Harvard, was consequently offered the opportunity to attend that university, from which he graduated in 1915. The first Harvard to attend Harvard, he died in the First World War less than three years later, leaving a wife and infant son.

After his death a fellow Army officer wrote, "If Harvard College made him what he was, I want my sons to go there that it may do the same for them." Harvard's Lionel Hall, and its Lionel de Jersey Harvard Scholarship, are named in his honour.

== Background ==
In 1908 editor Mark A. De Wolfe Howe discovered an 1847 letter in which Harvard President Edward Everett makes reference to a "Reverend John Harvard" living at the time in Plymouth, England, calling him "a Wesleyan clergyman whose ancestor ... was a brother of our founder". Inquiries led to the identification of London businessman Thomas Mawson Harvard as the youngest son of this nineteenth-century Reverend John Harvard (1819–1888), through whom he was descended from Thomas Harvard (1609–1637), brother of Harvard University founder John Harvard (1607–1638), who had died childless.

Thomas Mawson Harvard's elder son Lionel de Jersey Harvard (called "Leo" by his family) was at the time attending St Olave's and St Saviour's Grammar School in Southwark‍—‌the successor to St Saviour's Grammar School, which John Harvard had himself attended. (Note: St Saviour's Grammar School had merged with St Olave's Grammar School in 1896.) Many in Lionel's line had (again as had John Harvard) attended Emmanuel College, Cambridge and become ministers. On his leaving St Olave's, however, the family's finances ruled out any ambition to attend Emmanuel College himself, and so he took employment with a firm of marine insurance brokers.

In 1910 a group of Harvard alumni offered to underwrite Lionel's attendance at Harvard College, (Note: On 28 September 1914 the President and Fellows of Harvard College voted to "express their gratitude ... to four anonymous friends for gifts amounting to $450 towards the expenses of Lionel de Jersey Harvard for the year 1914–15.") which itself waived the tuition of $150 per year. He failed his first attempt at the entrance exam, but after a year of refresher study he qualified, and "set out for Cambridge, Massachusetts in lieu of Cambridge, England", as his friend John Paulding Brown put it later. (Note: "Lionel took the examination in June 1910. He had been out of school and at work for a year, however, and this fact, together with the wide difference in the courses pursued by English and American secondary schools, prevented him from doing himself justice ... Nothing daunted, he went back to school for a year, and, profiting from his 1910 experiences with the examination papers, he tried again and was successful. [In 1911] Harvard itself gave no examination in London, as there were no other candidates for admission, but the young man passed the examination of the college entrance examination board, and this was accepted by Harvard.")

== Harvard College ==
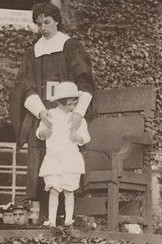
Playing his distant uncle John Harvard in pageant celebrating the 150th anniversary of Hollis Hall

The "sentimental and romantic" story of "how Mother Harvard sought and found one of her own" was reported throughout the United States, and on 26 September 1911 the Boston Transcript announced, "Harvard of Harvard Here". "He had the time of his life getting safely ashore [past] reporters and camera artists", said The Cambridge Tribune. "Apparently the one thing he does not wish is notoriety of any kind." Howe later wrote that "it seemed like the realization of a fairy-tale ... Our local newspapers did everything in their power to spoil him, if he had been spoilable. His arrival and history were glaringly chronicled." His freshman rooms were in Weld Hall.

He was a good student if not brilliant, and one of the most popular members of his class; Brown called him "a little different from the boys who come up each year as Freshmen, more gentle, perhaps, and more self-controlled." He belonged to the Hasty Pudding and D.U. Clubs, Delta Kappa Epsilon, the Signet Society, the Glee Club, the Dramatic, Musical and Cosmopolitan Clubs, the Social Service Committee of Phillips Brooks House, the Chapel Choir, the Memorial Society, and the Christian Association; and was an officer of several of these. Though on arrival he had told reporters that he played soccer and tennis, and wanted to learn baseball and American football, his participation in organized athletics was limited to class crew.

His junior-year recitation of Alfred Noyes' "The Highwayman" won him the Boylston Prize, and after he portrayed John Harvard in a pageant celebrating the 150th anniversary of Hollis Hall his classmates began calling him John. "Great was the applause whenever the [Harvard Glee Club] broke into, 'Here's to Johnny Harvard, fill him up a glass, Fill him up a glass to his name and fame,' for there he was in person. [He] seemed a living symbol of all that was best and brightest in Harvard itself, manifested to us briefly after three hundred years." (Note: The lyrics are from the song "Johnny Harvard".)

=== Commencement ===
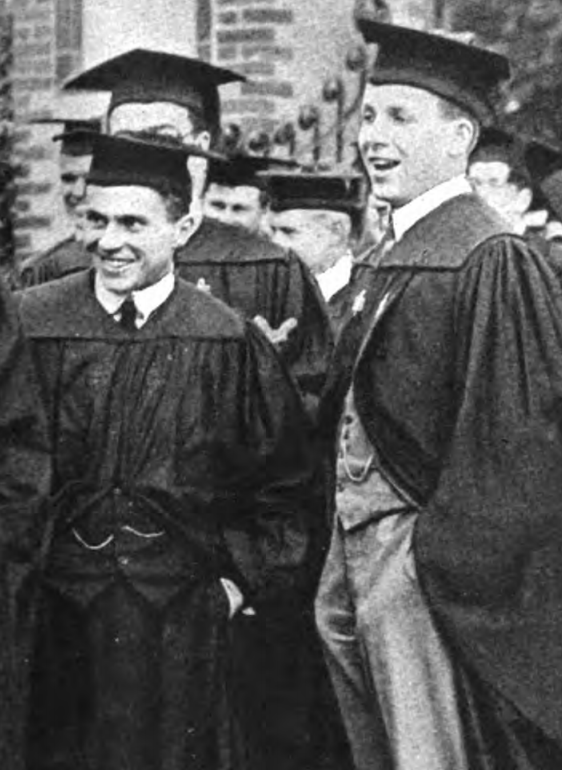
Lionel Harvard (right) on Commencement Day, 24 June 1915

Graduating cum laude in English in June 1915, he was selected to compose both the Class Poem and the Baccalaurete Hymn. His poem was "a stirring lyric adjuring all Harvard men in the present crisis of civilization [i.e. World War I] to stand for their historic ideals of freedom":

A call to arms rings out today / Far loftier than of steel,
The arms of the strong man girt with truth / To guard God's commonweal.

His hymn reflected similar themes:

Forward we go from out these hallowed walls, / Fearless with Thee where'er our duty calls;
Sundered in body, make us one in Thee, / One in the truth that makes Thy children free.

Speaking to the Alumni Association immediately after receiving his diploma he said, "I have had four years here full to the brim of happiness and ever-increasing joy ... I can never say enough in gratitude. When I say 'Thank you!' that word was never charged with more fervor." He later wrote to Howe:

I have never been able to find out who were the gentlemen who have been so generously looking after me in money matters whilst I have been in Cambridge. It has been awfully generous of them, and I do appreciate it. I hope I shall be able to repay the kindness of you all in many more ways than one.

== Army, marriage, and death ==
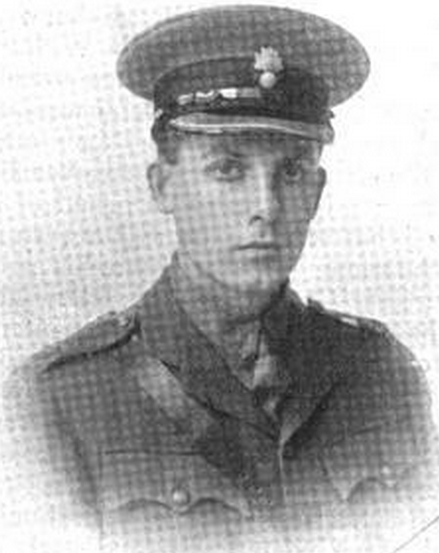
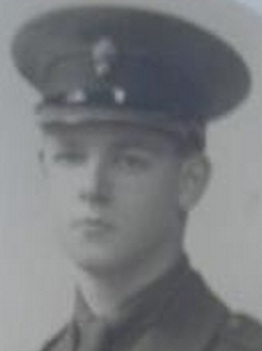
Lionel Harvard (left) and Kenneth Harvard.

Harvard planned to become a medical missionary, but on returning to London immediately after graduation he enlisted in the British Army. "It is all of a piece with the devotion which the best young men of Europe are rendering to their flags," said the Harvard Alumni Bulletin. He joined the Inns of Court Officers' Training Corps on 12 July 1915 and was commissioned a second lieutenant in the Grenadier Guards on 28 September. He was promoted to lieutenant in January 1916 and joined the 1st Battalion in France on 8 March 1916.

On 11 September 1915 he married childhood friend (Edith) May Barker, to whom he had been quietly engaged since before leaving for America. A son, John Peter de Jersey Harvard, was born 4 September 1916. Lionel was shot in the chest on 25 September 1916 at Lesboeufs during the Battle of the Somme but after a long convalescence he returned to combat in June 1917, as company commander.

At the outbreak of the war, Lionel's younger brother Kenneth O'Gorman Harvard (born 4 June 1897) gave up his intention to attend Harvard College. He was commissioned August 1915 and, with Lionel, was promoted to lieutenant in the Grenadier Guards in January 1916. He was killed at Pilckem Ridge, during the Battle of Passchendaele, on 1 August 1917; Lionel, who had been fighting nearby, helped bury him.

By March 1918 Lionel Harvard was commander of Number One Company, designated the King's Company‍—‌as Brown put it, "a high honor for a lieutenant, and usually a fatal one". On the morning of 30 March 1918 he was killed by a minenwerfer shell near Arras during the German spring offensive, just before a promotion to captain became effective. He was buried at Boisleux-au-Mont.

== Tributes and legacy ==
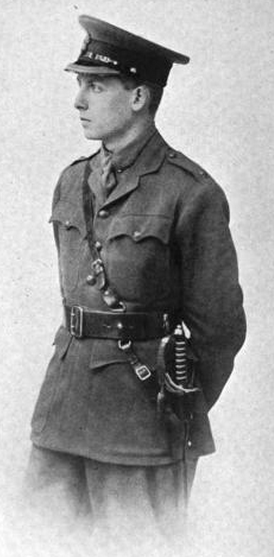
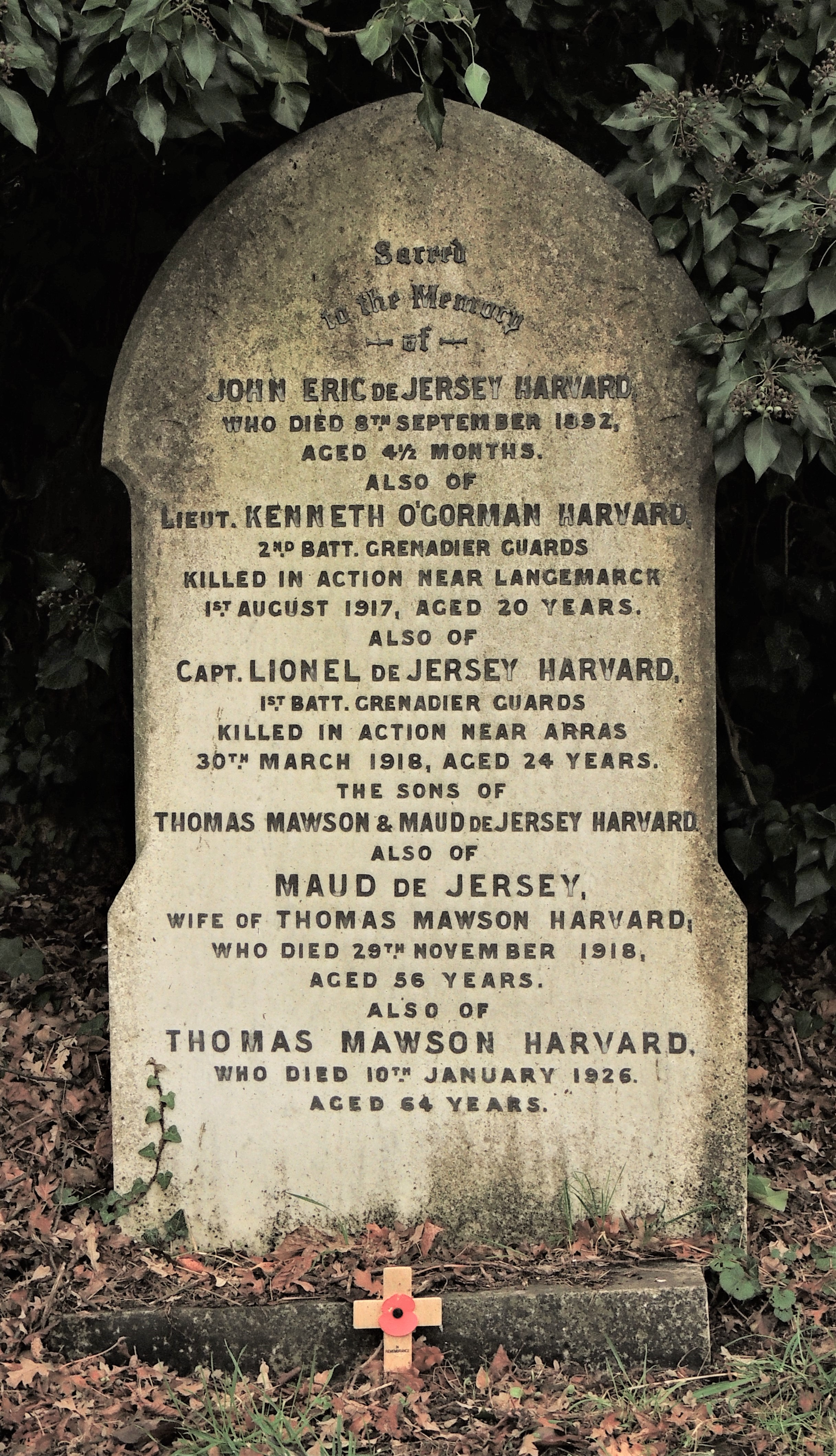
Lionel Harvard in uniform, and the family gravestone at Brockley and Ladywell Cemeteries

In 1919 poet Harry Webb Farrington published a hymn, "Lionel de Jersey Harvard", including the lines:

For hallowed halls, which bear his name, / Have felt his foot and heard his voice,
And sent him forth, not gowned / In student black and mortar board
But khaki-clad with helmet steel.

Harvard President Abbott Lawrence Lowell called Lionel Harvard's death "a great personal loss", noting that Lionel, like John Harvard, died just three years after taking his degree; Lowell's personal gift of $110,000 built Lionel Hall (1925) as a memorial. (Note: Lionel Hall was, by design, built on the site on which Lowell's distant cousin James Russell Lowell had delivered an ode, honouring the dead, at Harvard's Commemoration Day exercises just after the end of the American Civil War.) In his 1923 Commencement address, Lowell related a letter written by a British Army officer seeking advice on preparing his sons for Harvard College. In Lowell's telling, this officer explained that near the end of the war, he had

come into contact with an officer in the next sector of the line who told me that he was a graduate of Harvard College, whose name he bore. He told me what it had done for him. I never saw his face clearly while he was alive, for I met him only at night, and I never saw him by daylight until after he had been killed, a few days later. But if Harvard College made him what he was, I want my sons to go there that it may do the same for them.

Lionel and Kenneth were remembered on the memorial at their first school, Malvern House School, Lewisham Park (destroyed in an air raid during World War II) and on a memorial at the Wesleyan Church (now demolished) at Sydenham. (Note: Lewisham war memorials website) In 1923 the Associated Harvard Clubs established the Lionel de Jersey Harvard Scholarship, which annually funds a year's study at Emmanuel College by a Harvard College graduate. (Note: In 1935 J. P. Morgan Jr. donated $500 toward the fund for this scholarship.)

There was discussion of arranging for Lionel's son John Peter to follow his father to Harvard, but after he attended the school's tercentenary celebration as a guest in September 1936, Time reported that he would likely continue his education in England. (Note: Time said that John Peter Harvard "was imported for the Tercentenary. This youngster took no active part in the exercises, [but] was shunted quietly about as an interesting historical exhibit. Peter is enrolled at Durham Engineering School, where he will probably remain.") As a major in the Royal Artillery during World War II he survived imprisonment by the Japanese after being captured in the Battle of Singapore.

A second Harvard, John Harvard of Andes, New York, graduated cum laude from Harvard College in 1969.
