= Binelli =

Binelli is a surname. Notable people with the surname include:

- Augusto Binelli (born 1964), Italian basketballer
- Bourcard Binelli (born 1958), Cameroonian wrestler
- Daniel Binelli (born 1946), Argentine musical composer, orchestra director, and bandoneonist

== See also ==
- Luigi Binelli Mantelli (born 1950), Italian admiral
- Bonelli, surname
