= Anselmet =

Anselmet is a surname. Notable people with the surname include:

- Fabien Anselmet (born 1960), French ski mountaineer
- Thibault Anselmet (born 1997), French ski mountaineer
