= Brockley and Ladywell Cemeteries =

Cemetery in the London Borough of Lewisham, England

Ladywell and Brockley Cemetery
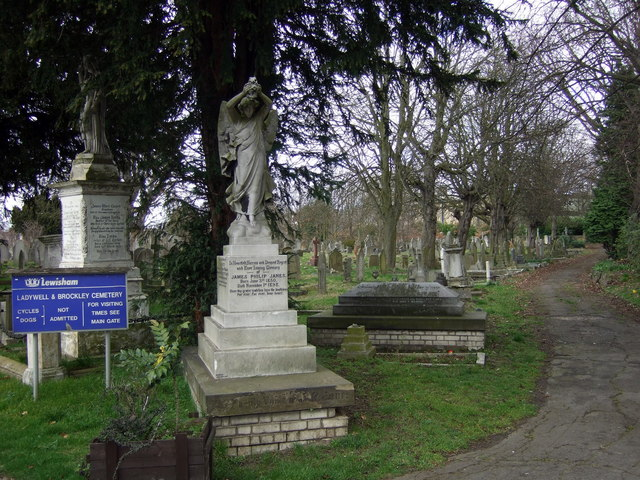
- Interactive map of Ladywell and Brockley Cemetery

Details
- Established: 1858
- Location: Brockley Grove, Lewisham, London, SE4 1DZ
- Country: England
- Coordinates: 51.4565°N 0.0313°W
- Size: 37 acres (15 ha)
- Website: Official website

Brockley and Ladywell Cemeteries (also known as Ladywell and Brockley Cemetery) were opened within one month of each other in 1858 and are sited on adjacent plots of previously open land. The two component parts are characteristic examples of the first wave of Victorian public cemeteries and are now part of the Brockley Conservation Area.

The cemeteries occupy 37 acres (15 ha) of land wholly within the London Borough of Lewisham and are owned and managed by the Cemeteries and Crematorium Services of the Borough. They are also nature conservation sites of Borough Importance Grade 1 and a haven for wildlife, plants and wildflowers.

Until 1948, the two cemeteries were completely separate, being divided by a wall. Ladywell Cemetery, which was previously known as Lewisham Cemetery, stands to the east of the wall and Brockley Cemetery, formerly Deptford Cemetery, lies to the west. Both cemeteries hold a wealth of historical interest. Evidence of Deptford's seafaring past can be found in the many inscriptions and adornments on the headstones.

== Notable burials ==
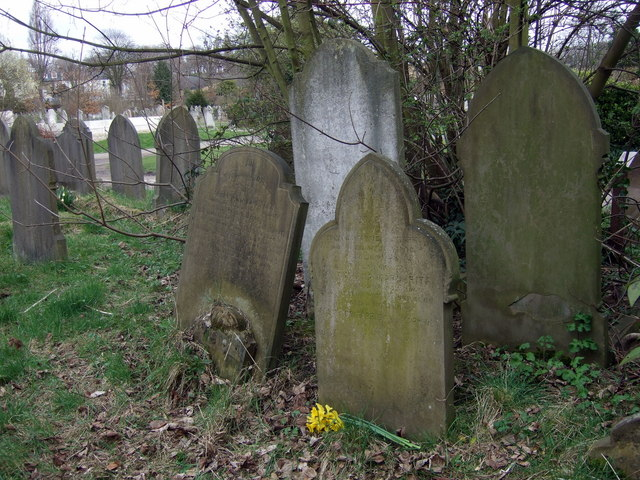

- Joseph Henry Blackburne (1841–1924), dominated the English chess scene in late 19th century
- Joe Bowker (1881–1955) English boxer who was Bantamweight champion of the world in 1904 and 1905
- Commander Archibald Walter Buckle (1889–1927), commanded Anson Battalion of the 63rd (Royal Naval) Division in World War I
- Jane Clouson (1854–1871), murdered girl with a monument paid for by public donations
- Horatio Henry Couldery (1832–1918), one of the best-known Victorian painters of animals
- Ernest Dowson (1867–1900), poet and decadent movement artist
- Sir William Eames (1821–1897), marine engineer
- Sir John Gilbert (1817–1897), illustrator, drawing for the Illustrated London News and designed a cover for Punch
- Sir George Grove (1820–1900), first director of the Royal College of Music, 1882, and author of 'Dictionary of Music and Musicians'
- Sir William Hardy (1807–1887), Deputy Keeper of Public Records, 1878–1886
- Lionel de Jersey Harvard, commemoration to "the only Harvard to attend Harvard", died in World War I, buried in France
- George Lacy Hillier (1856–1941), an English racing cyclist and pioneer of British cycling
- David Jones (1895–1974), war poet and artist
- Fernando Tarrida del Mármol (1861–1915), Cuban anarchist writer
- Margaret McMillan (1860–1931), educational reformer
- Charles Oliver Murray (1842–1923), Scottish artist and etcher
- Sir Alexander Nisbet (1812–1892), Inspector General of the Royal Navy and honorary physician to the Queen
- Beatrice Offor (1864–1920), British painter
- William Stephens (1817–1871), Grand Warden of the Grand Lodge of England
- Elizabeth Stirling (1819–95), organist and composer
- E. H. Windred (1875–1953), painter of racing pigeons
- Edward Lewis (1864–1922), Actor and Comedian.
- Samuel Tinsley (1847–1903), English chess player
- Mary Ann Bevan (1874–1933), "the ugliest woman in the world"
- Mrs Amelia Winters (1827–1889), poisoner

== War graves ==
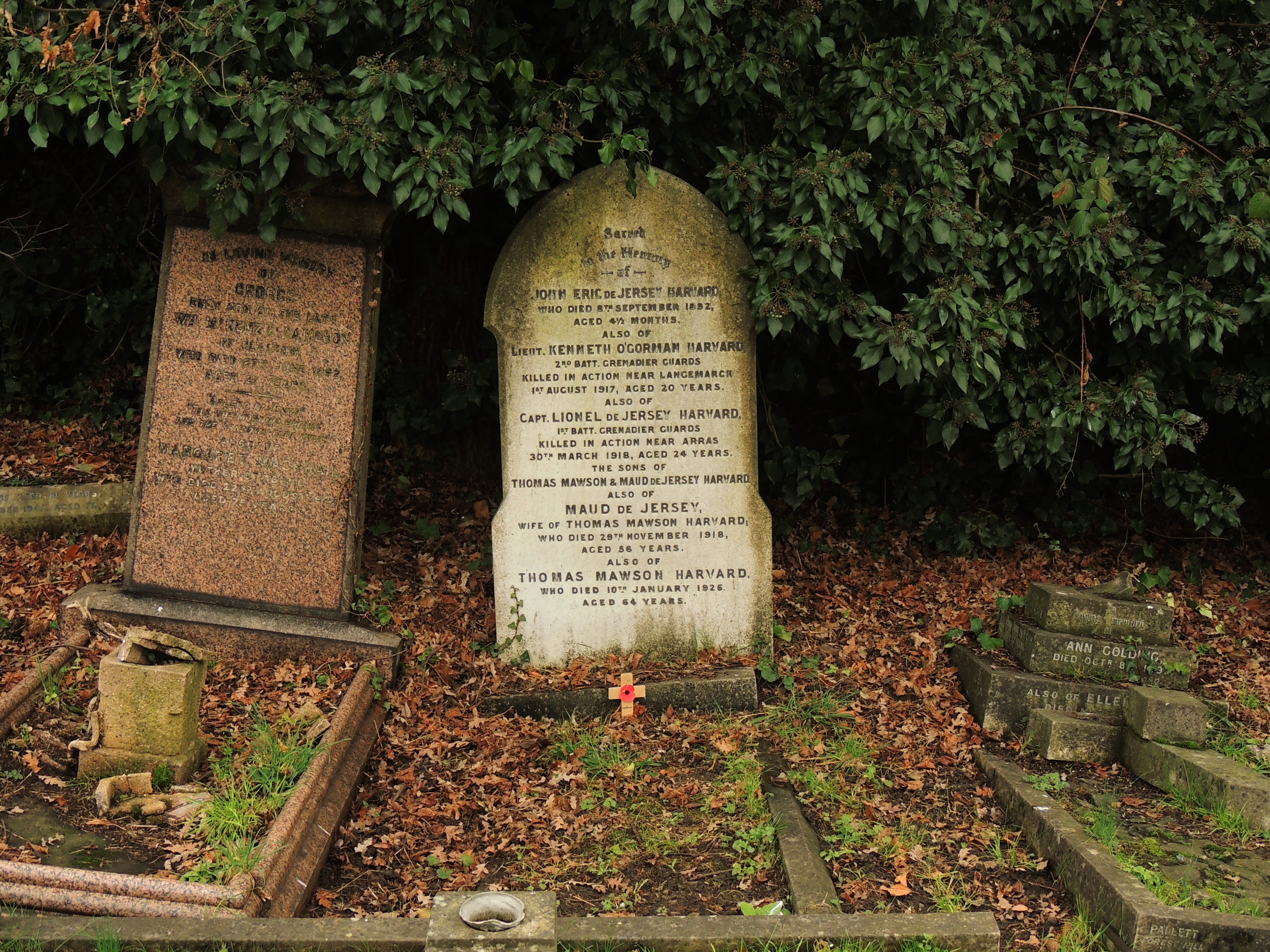
Stone commemorating Lionel de Jersey Harvard and his family

Both cemeteries contain war graves of Commonwealth service personnel registered and maintained by the Commonwealth War Graves Commission (CWGC).

Brockley Cemetery contains 195 war graves, 175 from World War I and 19 from World War II. The majority of the graves lie in a War Plot. On the cemetery's west side, a Screen Wall memorial lists those whose graves could not be marked by headstones.

Ladywell Cemetery contains 229 war graves from World War I and 18 from World War II. A War Graves plot contains 100 graves, the names of those buried there being listed on a Screen War Memorial in Plot D, as well as those buried elsewhere in the cemetery whose graves could not be marked by headstones. The CWGC also maintain a Commemorative Plot, in Plot B, on which 46 headstones have been erected.

== Ladywell entrance gates ==
The Ladywell entrance to the cemetery is Grade II listed. This notes that the gates were built in 1857 to the designs of William Morphrew, for the Lewisham Burial Board. The gates are made of wrought iron, the piers of stone; square, with set back, sloping tops culminating in saddleback gables. The gates are of florid Gothic design, the monogram of the Lewisham Burial Board in the three lower hubs to each gate, with trefoil and barley sugar decoration above. The name LADYWELL CEMETERY may have been inserted, or is more likely a reworking of the original name LEWISHAM CEMETERY; the style of the lettering, however, is clearly of 1857.
