= Commemoration Ode =

1865 poem by James Russell Lowell

The "Commemoration Ode" (also known as the "Ode Recited at the Harvard Commemoration") is an 1865 poem by James Russell Lowell. It was written for Harvard's Commemoration Day. Though the Ode received a lackluster reception when Lowell first delivered it on July 21, 1865, after it was republished later that year it gained a more positive reputation. By the 1870s the poem was very highly thought of, an opinion which gradually shifted in the mid-20th century, and it has since been less popular or praised.

== Background and writing ==
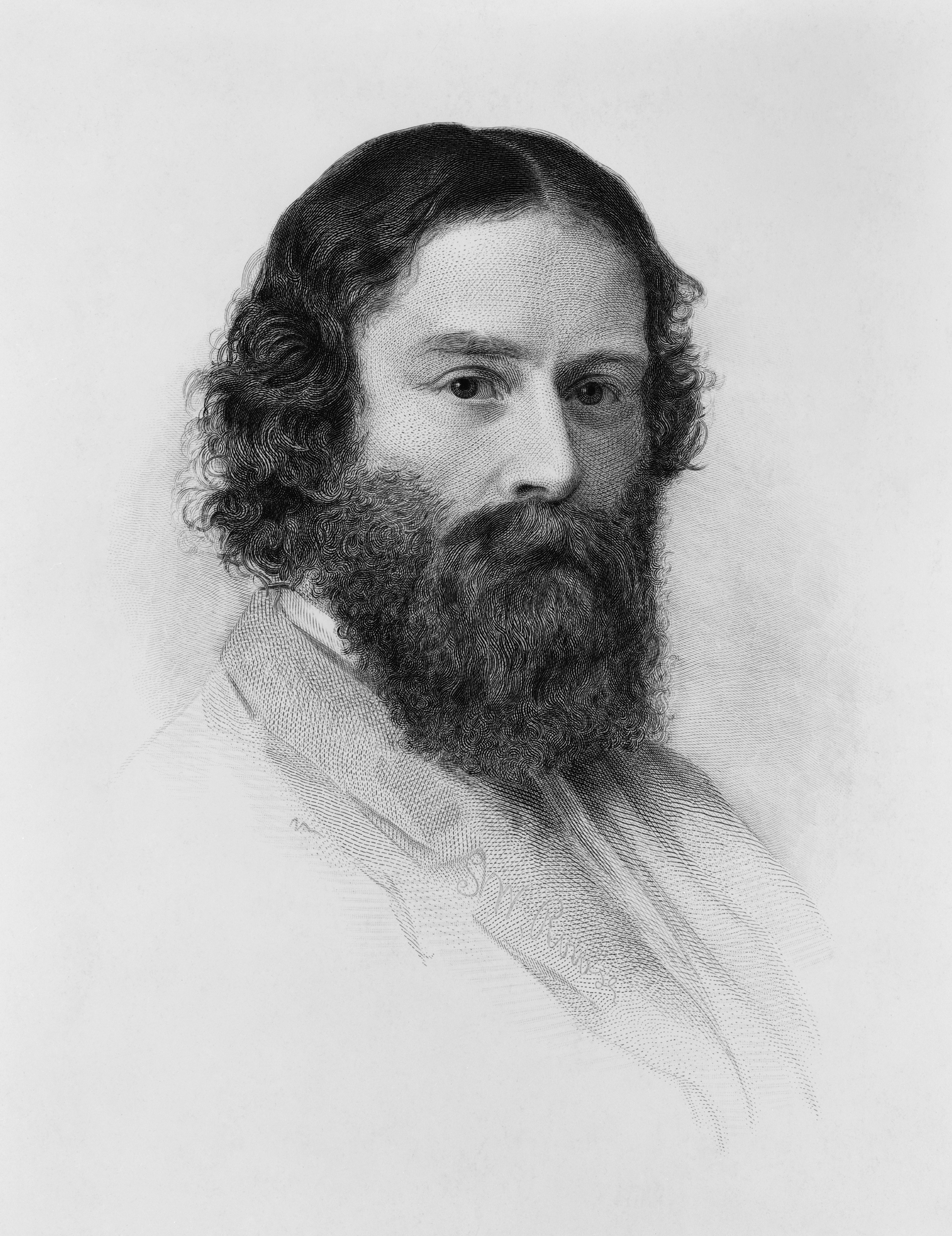
James Russell Lowell c. 1855

Lowell was approached about writing the poem in late May 1865 by Francis James Child, a professor at Harvard University who involved in planning a day of remembrance for Harvard students who had died in the American Civil War. At the time Lowell was a professor at Harvard and a relatively prominent poet. Sophia Bledsoe Herrick told Horace Scudder, an early biographer of Lowell, that Lowell wrote the poem the night before the ceremony, beginning it at 10:00 p.m. and finishing at 4:00 the following morning. The veracity of this story is unclear, but Lowell did tell Child to not expect a poem shortly before the ceremony. However, he also had passages of the poem drafted at least three days before the ceremony. Hamilton V. Bail argued in 1943 that Lowell simply "cop[ied] out and finish[ed]" the poem on the morning he delivered it. In his later years, Lowell would maintain the poem had been written in a rush over the two days preceding its delivery.

== Delivery and publication ==
Lowell presented some of his poem to Child, and read it in its entirety to John Holmes, and William Story on the morning of the ceremony. All three received the poem favorably. He read the poem at Harvard's Commemoration Day on July 21, 1865. Many events of the day had happened when Lowell delivered the ode in the evening. It was generally positively received but not immediately incredibly successful.

A sixth stanza of the poem is about Abraham Lincoln and was added shortly after Lowell's initial delivery of the poem. Lowell published 50 copies privately later that year, and the Ode was printed in the September 1865 issue of The Atlantic. It also appeared in several of Lowell's poetry collections, including Under the WIllows and Other Poems (1869), when a ninth stanza was added.

== Content and analysis ==
The poem was originally written in memory to Harvard graduates who died in the American Civil War. It had great personal significance to Lowell. In the poem, Lowell echoed writing of the English poet John Milton, some of William Shakespeare's lines—notably from Macbeth and Henry IV, Part 1, and Aaron Hill's "Verses Written on a Window". It is written as a "loose, irregular ode with unequal and unbalanced verses and broken stanzas". The structure has been compared to an ode written by the ancient Greek poet Pindar. By doing this, Lowell intended to make the poem easily recitable in public.

Stephen Adams in 2018 highlighted Lowell's ode as a moment emphasizing the emergence of the United States as a united nation.

== Reception ==
Reviewing Harvard's Commemoration Day, The New York Times described the poem as "beautiful", the Daily Evening Traveller called it "eloquent", and the Boston Daily Advertiser as "graceful". Several other prominent publications did not mention the ode at all, including The New York Herald and The New York Tribune. Lowell was upset at its lackluster reception, writing shortly after that "I did not make the hit I expected, and am ashamed at having been again tempted into thinking I could write poetry, a delusion from which I have been tolerably free these dozen years."

After the ode appeared in print, prominent literary figures began writing Lowell to praise his poem, including Ralph Waldo Emerson, George William Curtis, Sydney Howard Gay, James Freeman Clarke, Richard Grant White, Edward Everett Hale, John Weiss, Ebenezer Rockwood Hoar, and Thomas Wentworth Higginson. After that, the poem was very highly thought of. Henry James wrote that the poem's delivery was "the climax" of Harvard's Commemoration Day, "as to which one now sees—as to which one even then perhaps mutely, mystically made out—that a great thing that was to live had been but half-notedly born." By the late 1870s "Commemoration Ode" was often listed with Walt Whitman's "O Captain! My Captain!" as some of the best poetry honoring Lincoln. An 1898 article in The Washington Post deemed it "the noblest American poem." In 1900 Edmund Clarence Stedman wrote in the anthology American Poetry that "It would be criminal" to not include Lowell's full ode.

As late as 1943 the poem was considered by some the "grandest" of Lowell's poems. The author George F. Whicher described the poem as "the finest American example of poetry written for a public occasion" in 1950. Opinions on "My Captain!" and "Commemoration Ode" remained high until a critical reappraisal in the 20th century. The poems became less highly thought of because of a perceived conventionality and lack of originality. Martin B. Duberman wrote that "As identification with the Ode's mood has, through time, faded, its technical faults have become more apparent." Dumerman highlights its derivative nature from other poets and how Lowell reverts to "stock images" in the poem, but considers some moments to convey "passionate authenticity". Edmund Wilson wrote in his work Patriotic Gore that "it is a gauge of the mediocre level of the poetry of the Civil War that Lowell's Ode should have been thought to have been one of its summits." From 1943 to 2009 there was little written on the poem. In 1980 a biographer of Lowell placed the Ode as one of Lowell's three most grand poems.

== Bibliography ==
- Griffin, Martin (2009). Ashes of the Mind: War and Memory in Northern Literature, 1865–1900. University of Massachusetts Press. ISBN 978-1-55849-689-7. JSTOR j.ctt5vk9b1.
- Csicsila, Joseph (2004). "Nineteenth-Century Poetry: Whitman, Dickinson, Alice Cary, Phoebe Cary, Larcom, Thaxter, Lanier, Tabb". Canons by Consensus : Critical Trends and American Literature Anthologies. Tuscaloosa, Alabama: University of Alabama Press. pp. 55–85. ISBN 978-0-8173-8178-3. OCLC 320324064.
- Pannapacker, William (2004). Revised Lives: Whitman, Religion, and Constructions of Identity in Nineteenth-Century Anglo-American Culture. Milton Park, Abingdon: Routledge. ISBN 978-1-135-92451-5.
- Adams, Stephen (2018). ""Speaking as an American to Americans": James Russell Lowell's "Harvard Commemoration Ode" and the Idea of Nationhood". The Patriot Poets. Montreal: McGill-Queen's University Press. ISBN 978-0-7735-5594-5. OCLC 1078636778.
- Bail, Hamilton Vaughan (1943). "James Russell Lowell's Ode: Recited at the Commemoration of the Living and Dead Soldiers of Harvard University, July 21, 1865". The Papers of the Bibliographical Society of America. 37 (3): 169–202. ISSN 0006-128X. JSTOR 24293537.
- Duberman, Martin B. (1966). James Russell Lowell. Boston : Houghton Mifflin Company.
- Heymann, C. David (1980). American Aristocracy: The Lives and Times of James Russell, Amy, and Robert Lowell. New York : Dodd, Mead. ISBN 978-0-396-07608-7.
