= Bonnell (name) =

Bonnell is both a surname and a given name. Notable people with the name include:

== Surname ==
- Barry Bonnell (born 1953), former outfielder and third baseman in Major League Baseball
- Bonnie Bonnell (1905–1964), American vaudeville performer
- Bruno Bonnell (21st century), French businessman and politician, one of the founders of Infogames Entertainment
- Dawn Bonnell, American materials scientist and engineer
- Jon Bonnell, American chef
- Joseph Bonnell (1802–1840), U.S. Army Officer and Republic of Texas Officer
- Lorne Bonnell (1923–2006), Canadian physician, provincial politician, and senator
- Max Bonnell (born 1962), Australian lawyer and cricket historian
- Megan Bonnell, Canadian musician
- Sadie Bonnell (1888–1993), English ambulance driver, first woman to win the Military Medal
- Steve Bonnell (21st century), punk rock musician with Schoolyard Heroes
- Steven Kenneth Bonnell II (born 1988), known as Destiny, live streamer and political commentator
- Yolanda Bonnell, Canadian actress and playwright

== Given name ==
- Bonnell Thornton (1725–1768), English poet, essayist, and critic
- Ulrich Bonnell Phillips (1877–1934), American historian
