= Alexander Nisbet (Royal Navy officer) =

British surgeon (1795–1874)

Sir Alexander Nisbet (6 April 1796 – 22 June 1874) was a Scottish naval surgeon notable for his role in early convict transports to Australia, and as HM Inspector of Hospitals for the Royal Navy.

== Life ==
Alexander Nisbet was born in Oldhamstocks, East Lothian, Scotland, son of Margaret Patterson and Captain Alexander Nisbet. He joined the British Royal Navy Medical Service in 1812. He saw active service during the American War (1812-1814). In 1823 he completed a doctorate in medicine at the University of Edinburgh, submitting a dissertation entitled Pneumonia Typhode. He then began a long and successful career as a surgeon-superintendent serving on seven convict ships transporting convicts from the UK to Australia (1824-1840).

In January 1830 Nisbet decided to return to Australia on the Asia to work as assistant commissioner for the Australian Agricultural Company until he was replaced in August 1831.

In 1841 Nisbet was included on the list of surgeons for the Royal Navy and served in Cornwallis. In 1844 Nisbet became deputy director of Hospitals at Greenwich. Nisbet also worked in 1844 as deputy medical inspector of hospitals and fleets on half-pay.

On 12 December 1854, at Arley, Staffordshire, he married Lucy Susannah Davenport, daughter of the Rev. E.S. Davenport. In 1855, Nisbet was appointed Inspector of Hospitals and Fleets at Haslar Royal Hospital, retiring from the Royal Navy in 1861. In 1865 Nisbet started to receive the good service pension.

He was appointed as Honorary Physician to Queen Victoria in 1873 and later that year he was knighted by Prime Minister William Ewart Gladstone.

He died of "natural decay" at his home Arley Lodge in Lee, London at the age of 79, and is buried in Brockley and Ladywell Cemeteries.
