= HMS Pathfinder (G10) =

1941 P-class destroyer

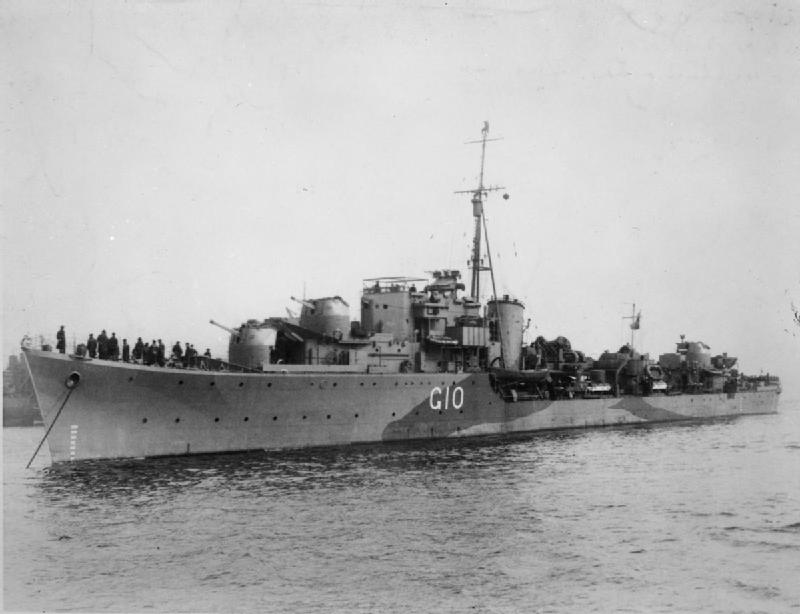

History

United Kingdom
- Name: HMS Pathfinder
- Ordered: 2 October 1939
- Builder: Hawthorn Leslie and Company, Newcastle upon Tyne
- Laid down: 5 March 1940
- Launched: 10 April 1941
- Commissioned: 13 April 1942
- Identification: Pennant number: G10
- Fate: Scrapped in 1948
- Notes: Badge: On a Field per Pale wavy and White a bloodhound Proper.

General characteristics
- Class & type: P-class destroyer
- Displacement: 1,640 long tons (1,666 t) standard; 2,250 long tons (2,286 t) full
- Length: 345 ft (105 m) o/a
- Beam: 35 ft (11 m)
- Draught: 12 ft 3 in (3.73 m)
- Installed power: 40,000 shp (30,000 kW); 2 × Admiralty 3-drum boilers
- Propulsion: 2 shafts; 2 × steam turbines
- Speed: 36 knots (67 km/h; 41 mph)
- Range: 3,850 nautical miles (7,130 km; 4,430 mi) at 20 knots (37 km/h; 23 mph)
- Complement: 176
- Armament: 4 × single QF 4 in Mk.V (102 mm); 1 × quadruple QF 2 pdr Mk.VIII (40 mm); 4 × single QF 20 mm Oerlikon; 2 × quadruple mounts for 21-inch (533 mm) torpedoes; 4 × throwers and 2 × racks for 70 depth charges

HMS Pathfinder was a P-class destroyer built for the Royal Navy during the Second World War. She was damaged while serving in the Far East, and was scrapped after the end of the war.

== Description ==
The P-class destroyers were repeats of the preceding O class, except that they were armed with 4-inch (102 mm) anti-aircraft guns. They displaced 1,640 long tons (1,670 t) at standard load and 2,250 long tons (2,290 t) at deep load. The ships had an overall length of 345 feet (105.2 m), a beam of 35 feet (10.7 m) and a deep draught of 12 feet 3 inches (3.7 m). They were powered by two Parsons geared steam turbines, each driving one propeller shaft, using steam provided by two Admiralty three-drum boilers. The turbines developed a total of 40,000 shaft horsepower (30,000 kW) and gave a maximum speed of 36 knots (67 km/h; 41 mph). The ships carried a maximum of 500 long tons (510 t) of fuel oil that gave them a range of 3,850 nautical miles (7,130 km; 4,430 mi) at 20 knots (37 km/h; 23 mph). The ships' complement was 176 officers and men.

Pathfinder was armed with four QF 4-inch Mark V guns in single mounts, two pairs [superfiring] fore and aft. Her light anti-aircraft suite was composed of one quadruple mount for 2-pounder "pom-pom" guns and four single Oerlikon 20 mm cannon. The ship was fitted with two above-water quadruple mount for 21-inch (533 mm) torpedoes. The ship was fitted with four depth charge throwers and two racks for 70 depth charges.

== Construction and career ==
The ship was built by Hawthorn Leslie & Co, and was launched on 10 April 1941, and commissioned in April 1942. During the war, Pathfinder was active in a number of theatres, and helped to sink several enemy submarines.

Pathfinder was commanded by Commander Edward Albert Gibbs from January 1942 to November 1943, during which time she assisted the destroyer Ithuriel in sinking the Italian submarine Cobalto, assisted the destroyers Vimy and Quentin to sink the German submarine U-162, assisted in the rescue of nearly 5,000 survivors from the troopship Strathallan after it was torpedoed off Oran, Algeria. She also sank the German submarine U-203 with assistance from Swordfish aircraft flying off the aircraft carrier Biter.

On 11 February 1945, Pathfinder was hit by an Imperial Japanese army fighter-bomber Ki-43 off Ramree, and was taken out of service. She sailed back to the UK using her starboard engine. On arrival at Devonport she was placed in reserve. She was then sold to the ship breakers Howells and scrapped in November 1948 at Milford Haven.
