= Bonnelly =

Bonnelly is a surname. Notable people with the surname include:

- Idelisa Bonnelly (1931–2022), Dominican marine biologist
- Rafael Filiberto Bonnelly (1904–1979), lawyer, scholar and president of Dominican Republic
- Sully Bonnelly (born 1956), Dominican fashion designer

== See also ==
- Bonnell (disambiguation)
