= Edward Albert Gibbs =

- Born: 1 April 1903; Hendon, Middlesex
- Died: 22 July 1982 (aged 79); Taunton Deane, Somerset
- Military career
- Allegiance: United Kingdom
- Branch: Royal Navy
- Service years: 1923–1949
- Rank: Captain
- Commands: HMS Kestrel (1945–46); HMS Pathfinder (1942–43); HMS Fortune (1939–40); HMS Hasty (1936–39); HMS Wren (1936)
- Conflicts: Second World War: Norwegian Campaign; Operation Menace
- Awards: Companion of the Distinguished Service Order & Three Bars; Mentioned in despatches (2)

Edward Albert Gibbs, DSO & Three Bars (1 April 1903 – 22 July 1982) was an officer in the Royal Navy who commanded anti-submarine destroyers in the Second World War. He was the first person to be appointed a Companion of the Distinguished Service Order (DSO) with three bars four times in the Second World War.

== Career ==
Gibbs joined the Royal Navy in 1923. He was a commander at the outbreak of war in 1939. He commanded the destroyer HMS Fortune from July 1939 to November 1940 and then the destroyer HMS Pathfinder from January 1942 to November 1943. Gibbs was promoted to the rank of captain in December 1946 and retired from the Royal Navy in February 1949.

=== HMS Fortune ===
HMS Fortune helped HMS Forester sink U-27 with depth charges west of Scotland in September 1939. Gibbs was awarded the DSO in December 1939.

In the following spring, while escorting units of the Home Fleet north-west of Shetland, HMS Fortune was credited with sinking U-44, although later research suggests that the submarine was destroyed in a minefield, which had been laid by other British destroyers on 13 March 1940. In April 1940, HMS Fortune escorted the aircraft carriers HMS Ark Royal and HMS Glorious while they provided air cover for the evacuation of British forces from Åndalsnes and Namsos during the Norwegian Campaign.

In September 1940, HMS Fortune was part of Operation Menace, escorting Force M for the intended Free French landings at Dakar. On 24 September, during the naval bombardment of Dakar, HMS Fortune she sank the Vichy French submarine Ajax, rescuing 76 of the crew.

Gibbs was awarded the first Bar to his DSO in March 1941.

=== HMS Pathfinder ===
HMS Pathfinder helped HMS Ithuriel bring the Italian submarine Cobalto to the surface with depth charges off Bizerta, Tunisia in August 1942, and the submarine was rammed and sunk by HMS Ithuriel. The following month, HMS Pathfinder helped HMS Vimy and HMS Quentin sink the German submarine U-162 with depth charges in the mid-Atlantic.

Gibbs was mentioned in despatches in November 1942, and then awarded a second Bar to his DSO in December 1942.

Also in December 1942, HMS Pathfinder assisted in the rescue of nearly 5,000 survivors from the troopship Strathallan after she was torpedoed off Oran, Algeria, and in April 1943, HMS Pathfinder sank the U-203 with depth charges off Cape Farewell, Greenland, with assistance from Swordfish aircraft flying from HMS Biter.

Gibbs was mentioned in despatches again in April 1943, and awarded a third Bar to his DSO in July 1943.
