= Hugh Kerr (footballer) =

Scottish footballer (1882–1918)

Personal information
- Full name: Hugh Stewart Kerr
- Date of birth: 1882
- Date of death: 10 April 1918 (aged 35–36)
- Position: Centre forward

Senior career*
Years	Team	Apps	(Gls)
- Westerlea
1903–1904	Ayr	10	(5)
1904	Manchester United	2	(0)
- * Club domestic league appearances and goals

Hugh Stewart Kerr (1882 – 10 April 1918) was a Scottish footballer. His regular position was as a forward. He played for Westerlea, Ayr, and Manchester United. Kerr joined Ayr from Westerlea in 1903, but only spent half a season there before joining Manchester United in January 1904. However, the Ayr officials were of the opinion that United had made an illegal, unofficial approach to sign Kerr, and an enquiry into the transfer was set up by the International Football Association Board (IFAB). Kerr made his Manchester United debut in a 2–1 defeat away to Blackpool on 9 March 1904, followed by another appearance in a 2–0 home win over Grimsby Town on 26 March. The IFAB found United innocent of any illicit contact with Kerr about a week later, but he was ultimately released at the end of the season.

== Personal life ==
Kerr served as a private in the London Scottish during World War I and died of wounds on 10 April 1918. He was buried in Étaples Military Cemetery.
