= Distinguished Service Order =

UK military decoration

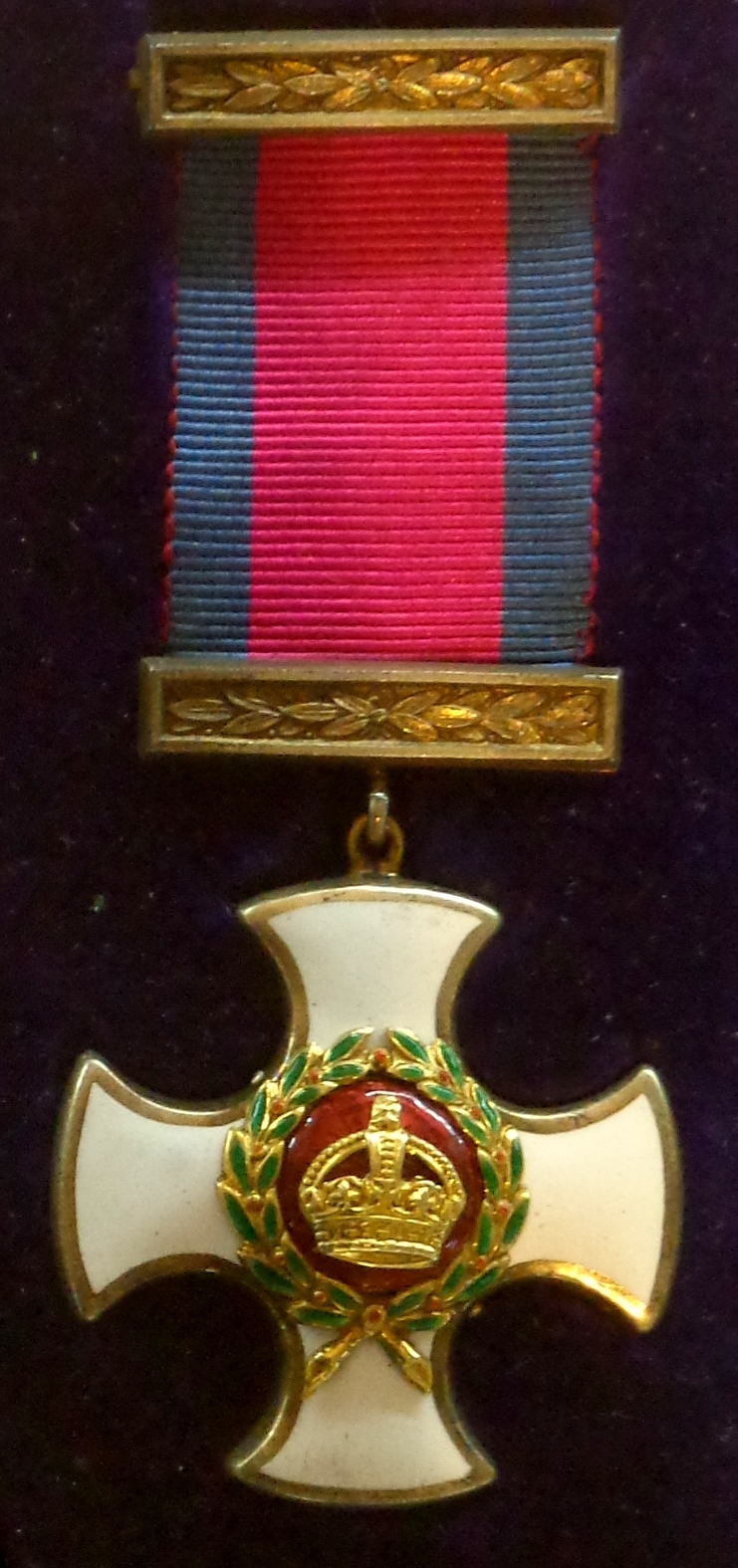
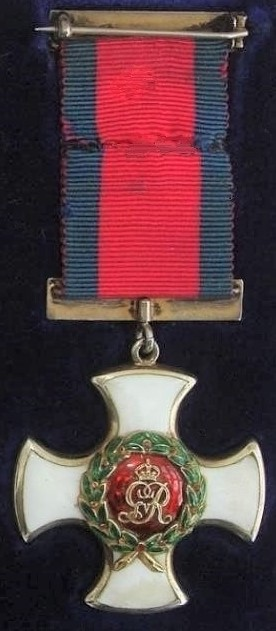
- Obverse and reverse (reign of George V)

Awarded by United Kingdom and Commonwealth
- Type: Order
- Established: 6 September 1886
- Eligibility: Members of the Armed Forces
- Awarded for: "For highly successful command and leadership during active operations."
- Status: Currently awarded
- Sovereign: Charles III
- Grades: Companion

Statistics
- Total inductees: Victoria: 1,646; Edward VII: 78; George V: 9,900; George VI: 4,943; Charles III: 1

Precedence
- Next (higher): Commander of the Most Excellent Order of the British Empire (CBE)
- Next (lower): Lieutenant of the Royal Victorian Order (LVO)
- DSO ribbon

The Distinguished Service Order (DSO) is a military award of the United Kingdom, as well as formerly throughout the Commonwealth, conferred for operational gallantry for highly successful command and leadership during active operations, typically in actual combat.

Equal in British precedence of military decorations to the Conspicuous Gallantry Cross and Royal Red Cross, since 1993 the DSO is eligible to all ranks conferred specifically for "highly successful command and leadership during active operations".

== History ==
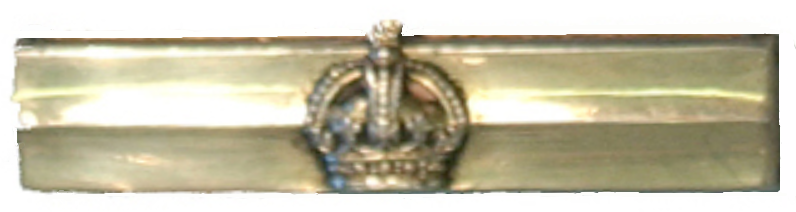
Bar for additional DSO conferral

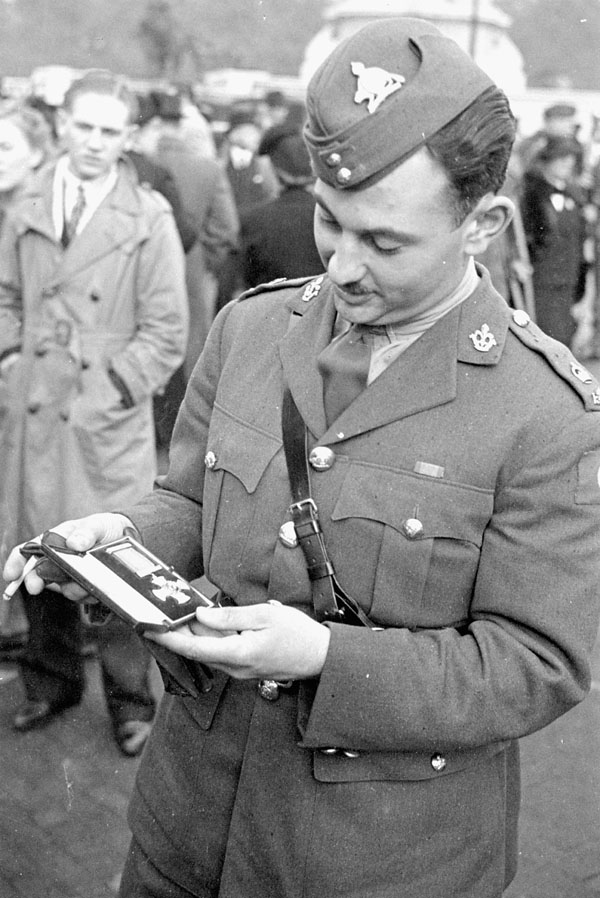
Major Paul Garneau, of the Royal 22^{e} Régiment, with the DSO insignia he received for "gallant and distinguished services in the combined attack on Dieppe" after his investiture at Buckingham Palace in October 1942

Instituted on 6 September 1886 by Queen Victoria by Royal Warrant published in The London Gazette on 9 November, the first companions appointed were dated 25 November 1886.

The order was established to recognise individual instances of meritorious or distinguished service in war. It is a military order, and was, until recently, typically conferred on officers in command above the rank of major (or equivalent), with conferrals to lower ranks usually being for a high degree of gallantry, just short of deserving the Victoria Cross.

Whilst normally given for service under fire or under conditions equivalent to service in actual combat with the enemy, a number of conferrals made between 1914 and 1916 were under circumstances not under fire, often to staff officers, causing resentment among front-line officers. After 1 January 1917, commanders in the field were instructed to recommend this decoration for those serving under fire only.

From 1916, bars could be authorised for subsequent conferral, worn on the ribbon of the original insignia.

In 1942, the decoration was extended to officers of the Merchant Navy who had performed acts of gallantry whilst under enemy attack.

Prior to 1943, the DSO could be conferred on only commissioned officers of the Lieutenant-Colonel rank and above, for 'meritorious or distinguished service in wartime' under conditions of actual combat. If conferred on an officer ranking below Lieutenant-Colonel, it had to be a case of "a high degree of gallantry just short of deserving the Victoria Cross". In either case, being "Mentioned in Despatches" was a pre-condition for appointment to the Distinguished Service Order.

The stipulation that only those mentioned in despatches could be appointed to the Order was removed in 1943.

== Modern era ==
Since 1993, reflecting the review of the British honours system which recommended removing distinctions of rank in respect of operational awards, the DSO has been open to all ranks, with the conferral criteria redefined as "highly successful command and leadership during active operations". At the same time, the Conspicuous Gallantry Cross was introduced as the second-highest decoration for gallantry. Despite some fierce campaigns in Iraq and Afghanistan, the DSO has yet to be conferred on a non-commissioned rank.

The DSO was previously conferred throughout the Commonwealth but by the 1990s most, including Canada, Australia and New Zealand, had established their own honours systems, no longer recommending British honours.

== Nomenclature ==
Recipients of the Order, formally styled Companions of the Distinguished Service Order, are entitled to use DSO as post-nominal letters. All conferrals are announced in The London Gazette.

== Description ==
- The decoration signifying the conferral of the DSO is a silver-gilt (gold until 1889) cross with curved ends, 1.6 in (4.1 cm) wide, enamelled white and edged in gilt. It is manufactured by Messrs Garrard & Co, the Crown Jewellers.
- In the centre of the obverse, within a green enamelled laurel wreath, is the Imperial Crown in gold upon a red enamelled background. The reverse has the Royal Cypher of the reigning monarch in gold within a similar wreath and background.
- A ring at the top of the decoration attaches to a ring at the bottom of a gilt suspension bar, ornamented with laurel. Since 1938 the year of conferral has been engraved on the back of the suspension bar. At the top of the ribbon is a second gilt bar ornamented with laurel.
- The decorations are issued unnamed but some recipients have had their names engraved on the reverse of the suspension bar.
- The red ribbon is 1.125 in (2.86 cm) wide with narrow blue edges.
- The Bar for an additional conferral is plain gold with an Imperial Crown in the centre. Since about 1938, the year of the conferral has been engraved on the back of the Bar. A rosette is worn on the ribbon in undress uniform to signify the conferral of each Bar.

== Recipients ==
=== Numbers conferred ===
From 1918 to 2017, the Distinguished Service Order was conferred approximately 16,935 times, in addition to 1,910 bars. The figures to 1979 are laid out in the table below, the dates reflecting the relevant entries in the London Gazette:

| Period | Dates | Crosses | 1st bar | 2nd bar | 3rd bar |
|---|---|---|---|---|---|
| Pre-First World War | 1886–1913 | 1,732 | — | — | — |
| First World War | 1914–1919 | 9,881 | 768 | 76 | 7 |
| Inter-war | 1919–1939 | 148 | 16 | — | — |
| Second World War | 1939–1946 | 4,880 | 947 | 59 | 8 |
| Post-1945 | 1947–1979 | 204 | 20 | 5 | 1 |
| Total | 1886–1979 | 16,845 | 1,751 | 140 | 16 |

In addition, approximately 90 conferrals were made between 1980 and 2017, including for the Falklands, Gulf, Iraq and Afghanistan Wars, in addition to three Bars. The above figures include conferrals to the Commonwealth.

- In all, 1,220 DSOs were conferred on Canadians, plus 119 first bars and 20 second Bars.
- From 1901 to 1972, when the last Australian on whom the DSO had been conferred was announced, 1,018 conferrals were made to Australians, plus 70 first Bars and one second Bar.
- The DSO was conferred on more than 300 New Zealanders during the two World Wars.
- At least 14 Indian officers of the British Indian Army (i.e., until 1947) had conferred on them the DSO, with one in the First World War and 13 in the Second World War. The higher number conferred during the latter was due to the gradual Indianization of the British Indian Army from 1923 (see: South Asian Companions of the Distinguished Service Order).
- Honorary conferrals to members of allied foreign forces include at least 1,329 for the First World War.

=== Quadruple recipients ===
The following had conferred on them the DSO with three Bars (i.e., the DSO conferred four times):

- Archibald Walter Buckle, rose from naval rating in the Royal Naval Volunteer Reserve to command the Anson Battalion of the Royal Naval Division during the First World War
- William Denman Croft, First World War army officer
- William Robert Aufrere Dawson, Queen's Own Royal West Kent Regiment during the First World War, wounded nine times and mentioned in despatches at least five times
- Sir Basil Embry, Second World War Royal Air Force officer
- Sir Bernard Freyberg, also conferred on him the Victoria Cross, was appointed DSO three times during the First World War, and a fourth time during the Second World War
- Edward Albert Gibbs, Second World War destroyer captain
- Arnold Jackson, First World War British Army officer and 1500 metre Olympic gold medal winner in 1912
- Sir Douglas Kendrew, brigade commander in Italy, Greece and the Middle East between 1944 and 1946. Subsequently, appointed Governor of Western Australia
- Robert Sinclair Knox, First World War British Army officer
- Frederick William Lumsden, British First World War Royal Marines officer, also conferred on him the Victoria Cross
- Paddy Mayne, Special Air Service commander in the Second World War and Irish rugby player
- Sir Richard George Onslow, Second World War destroyer captain and later admiral
- Alastair Pearson, a British Army officer appointed DSO four times within the space of two years during the Second World War
- James Brian Tait, RAF pilot who also had conferred on him the DFC with Bar, completed 101 bombing missions in the Second World War
- Frederic John Walker, Second World War Royal Navy captain and U-boat hunter
- Edward Allan Wood, First World War army officer

== See also ==
- Military awards and decorations of the United Kingdom
- Orders, decorations, and medals of the Commonwealth realms
