= Charles Bunnell =

Charles Bunnell may refer to:

- Charles E. Bunnell (1878–1956), American former judge and University of Alaska president
- Charles R. Bunnell (1897–1968), American muralist, painter and printmaker
- Charles Sterling Bunnell (1901–1988), American banker

== See also ==
- Frank C. Bunnell (1842–1911), United States Army soldier and Congressman from Pennsylvania; middle name 'Charles'
