= Stephen and Mary Bunnell House =

Historic house in Utah, United States

- Formerly listed on the U.S. National Register of Historic Places
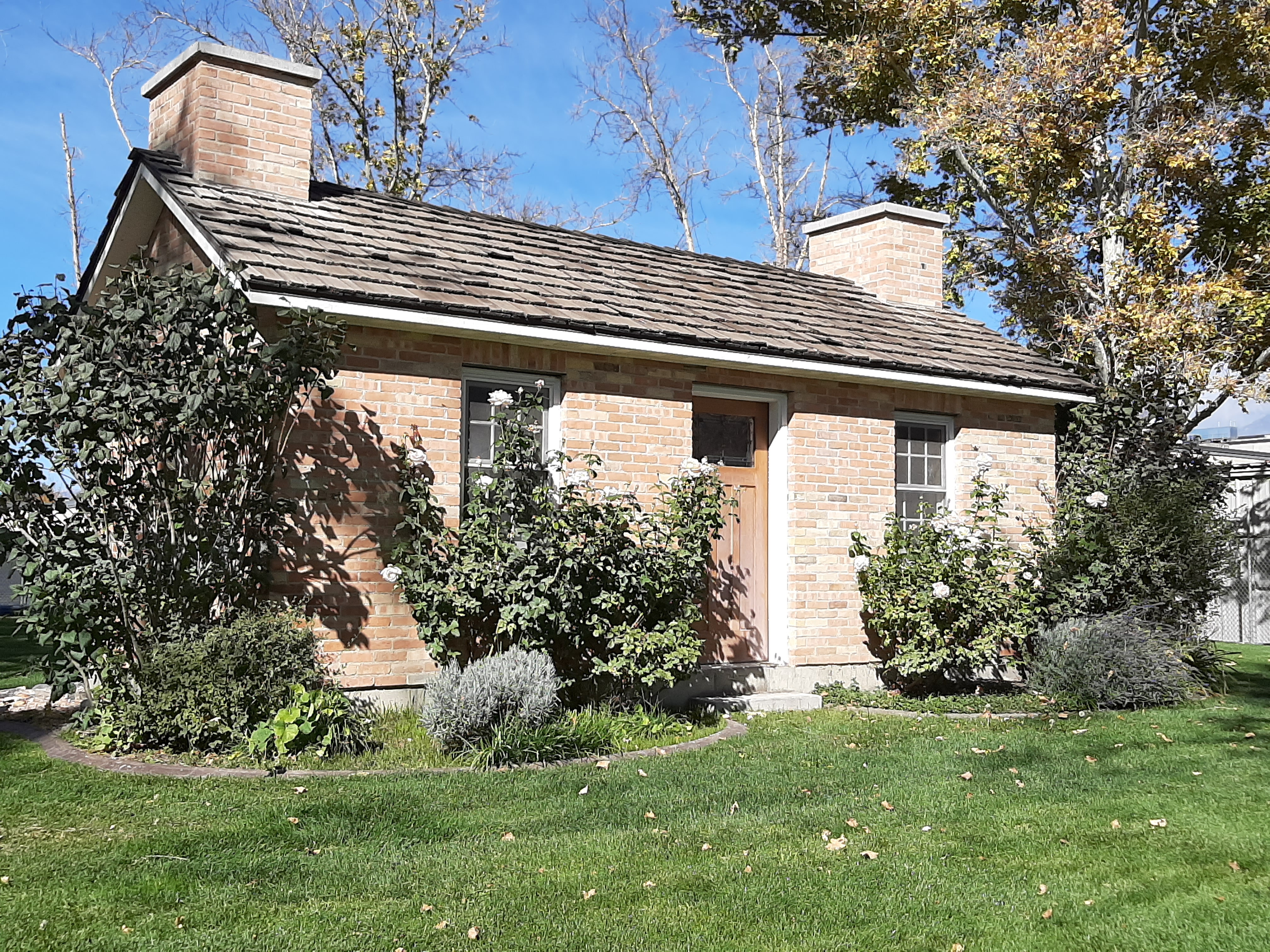
- The replica of the house in 2020

- Location within Utah Location within the United States
- Location: 970 S. 800 West, Utah Valley University, Orem, Utah
- Coordinates: 40°16′48″N 111°42′55″W
- Area: 0.6 acres (0.24 ha)
- Built: 1892
- Built by: Brunnell, Stephen Ithamer, Jr.
- Architectural style: Late Victorian, Mid 19th Century Revival
- NRHP reference No.: 96001171

Significant dates
- Added to NRHP: October 22, 1996
- Removed from NRHP: August 15, 2023

The Stephen and Mary Bunnell House was at 970 S. 800 West, on the Utah Valley University campus, Orem, Utah was built in 1892. It was listed on the National Register of Historic Places in 1996, and was delisted in 2023.

It was the farmhouse of a 60-acre (24 ha) farm with an orchard; it is now within the college campus.

In 2012 it was torn down to make way for a new building on campus, with plans to rebuild a smaller replica. The replica, also on campus, had been finished by 2015. Before it was torn down, Paul Cheney and the university's Digital Media Department created a virtual tour of the building. See http://virtual.uvu.edu/2012_bunnellHouse/.
