= Gonella =

Gonella is a surname. Notable people with the surname include:

- Guido Gonella (1905–1982), Italian politician
- Nat Gonella (1908–1998), British jazz trumpeter, bandleader, vocalist and mellophonist
- Pier Gonella, Italian guitarist
- Sergio Gonella (1933–2018), Italian businessman and football referee
