= W. R. A. Dawson =

British Army officer (1891-1918)

William Robert Aufrère Dawson
- Photograph published with his death notice in The Sphere on 25 January 1919
- Born: 23 June 1891; Cold Ash, England
- Died: 3 December 1918 (aged 27); Camiers, France
- Burial place: Étaples Military Cemetery
- Education: Oriel College, Oxford
- Military career
- Allegiance: United Kingdom
- Branch: British Army
- Service years: 1912–1918
- Rank: Lieutenant Colonel
- Commands: 6th Battalion, Queen's Own Royal West Kent Regiment
- Conflicts: First World War; Western Front; Second Battle of Ypres; Battle of Loos; Battle of the Somme; Battle of Arras; Battle of Cambrai; German spring offensive; Hundred Days Offensive
- Awards: Companion of the Distinguished Service Order & 3 Bars; Mentioned in Despatches (5)

William Robert Aufrère "Bob" Dawson (23 June 1891 – 3 December 1918) was a British Army officer in the First World War. He was appointed a Companion of the Distinguished Service Order (DSO) with three bars for his actions in command of the 6th (Service) Battalion, Queen's Own (Royal West Kent) Regiment from 1916 to his death in 1918, and Mentioned in Despatches at least five times. He was wounded in action at least seven times.

== Early life ==
Dawson was the son of William and Ethel Dawson, of Cold Ash near Newbury, Berkshire. His father was a lawyer, and his mother also became a solicitor.

He was educated at Bradfield College from May 1905 to July 1910 and Oriel College, Oxford.

== Army career ==
Dawson studied law at Oriel College, Oxford. He was a Cadet in the Officers' Training Corps at Oxford University and joined the Royal Field Artillery in 1912. He transferred to the Queen's Own (Royal West Kent) Regiment in June 1914. Most of the 1st Battalion was sent to France when the First World War broke out in August 1914, but Dawson remained in England to help form a 6th (Service) Battalion. He was promoted from second lieutenant to lieutenant in September 1914, then temporary captain in March 1915.

He served with the Royal West Kent Regiment on the Western Front from June 1915, in the 12th Division, and commanded the 6th Battalion from 1916 to his death in 1918. He refused staff appointments and the possibility of promotion to command a brigade in favour of remaining with his battalion, which became known as "Dawson's battalion". Dawson was often wounded, leading from the front. The unit served south of Ypres, at Hulluch near Loos, at the craters near Vermelles, was in reserve at the Battle of the Somme in July 1916, but joined the offensive on Ovillers, and then at Gueudecourt in October 1916.

He became temporary major when second in command of a battalion in August 1916, and formally took command of the 6th Battalion in November 1916 as acting lieutenant colonel, aged just 25. He was promoted to the substantive rank of captain in December 1916, and in January 1917 was promoted from acting lieutenant colonel when in command of a battalion to command a battalion in the rank of temporary lieutenant colonel (with seniority from December 1916).

He was wounded twice in 1916, He was wounded at Monchy near Arras in May 1917 but returned to command in August 1917. He was wounded again at Cambrai in November 1917. He returned to command in February 1918, and was wounded again in March in the German spring offensive. He was promoted to brevet major and returned to command in June 1918 for the Hundred Days Offensive.

He was severely wounded by an artillery shell near Nivelle on 23 October 1918. After a long period in the 20th General Hospital at Camiers, during which time he was visited by his parents, he died of wounds in December 1918. Although he had wished that his body should be returned to England, he was buried at Étaples Military Cemetery and is commemorated at St Margaret's at Cliffe

His first DSO was gazetted in April 1916, with the first Bar in July 1917, a second Bar in June 1918, and a third Bar (posthumously) in March 1919 (and citation in October 1919). He was also Mentioned in Despatches in June 1916, December 1917, and May 1918, and then (posthumously) in December 1918, and July 1919.
