= Commemoration Day (Harvard University) =

On July 21, 1865, Harvard University held a Commemoration Day as part of that year's Commencement Week, to celebrate the end of the American Civil War and honor the Harvard alumni who had served and died in it.

== Events ==
Shortly after the Battle of Appomattox Court House and the formalization of Confederate surrender, a "spontaneous movement" of Harvard alumni developed in support of honoring "Harvard soldiers living and dead". Of the then 2700 living graduates of Harvard (per 1863 records), nearly 600 had served in the Civil War, with 99 dying in the Union Army during the war. Contemporary sources suggest that Colonel Henry Lee of the Harvard class of 1836 was one of the key instigators of the commemoration plan. Harvard graduates assembled in Chickering's Concert Room on the 12th of May, 1865, to begin putting together plans for a "public recognition of the services rendered the country by graduates and students of the College during the War of the Rebellion".

John Knowles Paine, who had been appointed as Harvard's first Instructor of Music in 1862, was responsible for arranging music for the commemoration events. He arranged a choir of students, graduates, and members of the Harvard Musical Association along with others from the surrounding Boston and Cambridge area. The choir was accompanied by a twenty-six instrument orchestra. A "Commemoration Ode" delivered as part of the ceremonies by James Russell Lowell was widely reprinted.

== Sources ==
- As the Civil War finally ends, a relieved, sad, graduation day
- Harvard's Commemoration Day July 21, 1865 on JSTOR
- Introduction § Harvard University Archives Research Guide: Harvard and the Military
- The Cambridge Chronicle 26 August 1865 — Cambridge Public Library's Historic Cambridge Newspaper Collection
- Ode Recited at the Harvard Commemoration, July 21, 1865
