= Jon Bonnell =

American chef

Jon Bonnell is an American chef specializing in Texan cuisine. He is known for using Texan ingredients on his menus, including game.

== Education ==
Bonnell graduated from Vanderbilt University's Peabody College in 1994 with a degree in elementary education.

== Career ==
Bonnell is the owner of Bonnell's Fine Texas Cuisine, and Waters, Bonnell's Coastal Cuisine. He also opened the Buffalo Brothers gastropub.

He is the owner of Jon's Grille, which was founded by Jon Meyerson.

In 2012, Bonnell participated in a boycott of Dr Pepper products after the company purchased the rights to Dublin Dr Pepper and discontinued the drink. In 2018, he released a line of taco seasoning.

He published Carry Out, Carry On: A Year in the Life of a Texas Chef, about his experiences during the COVID-19 pandemic. In 2021, he received Fort Worth mayor Betsy Price presented Bonnell with a certificate recognizing his service to the community during the pandemic.

== Personal life ==
Bonnell and his wife have two children. He has ADHD.
