= Jesse H. Bunnell =

Telegraphist

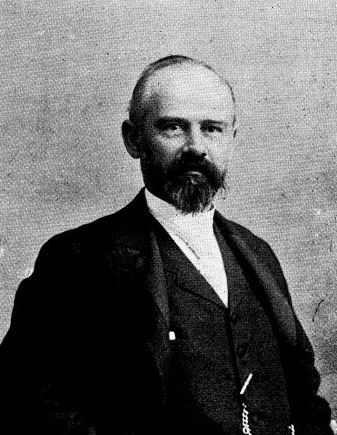
- Born: November 28, 1843
- Died: February 9, 1899 (aged 55)

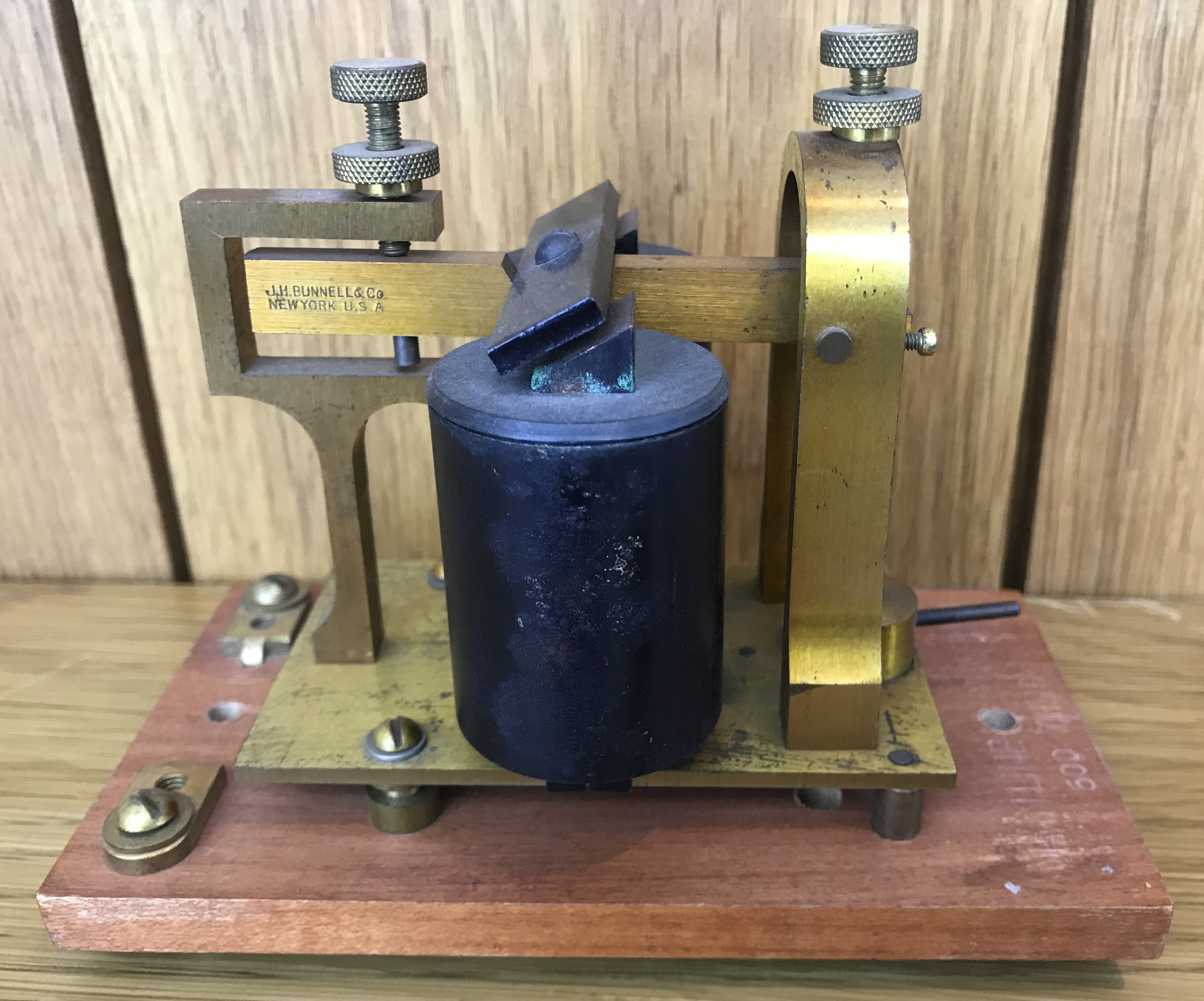
Telegraph sounder of J.H. Bunnel

Jesse H. Bunnell (November 28, 1843 – February 9, 1899) was a telegraphist, famous for his speed record in telegraph transmission, inventor, known for construction of different telegraph keys.

== Biography ==
=== Starting career in telegraphy ===
Jesse Bunnell was born on November 28, 1843, in Massillion. At the age of 11 he became a messenger, at 13 he became a full-time telegraph operator. At 17 he set a telegraph speed record, established while transmitting President Buchanan's last message to Congress. The speed was about 32 words per minute for 2 hours.

=== Service during the Civil War ===
Jesse was among first telegraphers, assigned to serve in United States Military Telegraph Corps. At the beginning of the Civil War, while he had been in Washington, he could serve for Abraham Lincoln himself, who was a constant visitor of telegraph office in USMT.

In December 1862 several telegraph operators signed and sent a petition to the USMT headquarters asking for an increase in payment. Jesse took part in that strike, but telegraphers were threatened with charges. Even though their demands were rejected, strikers managed to raise awareness of their working conditions.

From June 1862 to August 1864, Bunnell served as General McClellan's personal telegraph operator, and with Sherman's Army of the Cumberland. Jesse resigned on August 16, 1864.

=== Improvements in telegraphy ===
From 1864 to 1872 he formed a partnership with James Partrick, later, from 1875 to 1878, he worked for L. G. Tillotson and Co. In 1878, Jesse created his own company, J. H. Bunnell and Co. Jesse constantly developed telegraphic instruments. In 1868 he received a patent for telegraph repeater, printing telegraph, created different telegraph sounders and improved telegraph switchboard.

He is famous for his steel lever key, which was patented on February 15, 1881. In 1888, Bunnell invented his double speed key, which was later called "sideswiper" to help telegraphists avoid a "glass arm" (carpal tunnel syndrome).

=== Other inventions ===
Bunnell tried to use chemical spraying as a weapon. He patented a rubber bulb syringe, made to squirt chemicals, which could be used for self defence by cyclists against violent persons or dogs.

=== Death and heritage ===
Bunnell died of heart failure on February 9, 1899. He was buried in Brooklyn's garden Greenwood Cemetery.

Bunnell and Co. was one of the largest telegraph key suppliers in the US before the Second World War. As one of the country's main telegraphic manufacturers, examples of Bunnell's telegraph equipment can be found in the National Museum of American History, various railroad museums, and other communications museums. His company produced a variety of electrical and communications items for the American army through the Korean War, the Vietnam War, and the Cold War period.
