= Omar B. Bunnell =

American politician and businessman (1912–1992)

Member of the Utah State Senate
- In office 1967–1992

Personal details
- Born: February 19, 1912 Castle Dale, Utah, U.S.
- Died: October 21, 1992 (aged 80) Price, Utah, U.S.
- Party: Democratic
- Education: University of Utah
- Profession: Politician, businessman

Omar B. Bunnell (February 19, 1912 – October 21, 1992) was an American politician and businessman.

Bunnell was born in Castle Dale, Utah. He went to Carbon High School and the University of Utah. He was involved in the mobile house and banking business in Price, Utah and Moab, Utah. He served in the Utah Senate from 1967 to 1992 and was a Democrat. Bunnell died in Price, Utah.
