= Lorna Bonnel =

French ski mountaineer (born 1986)

Personal information
- Born: 10 November 1986 (age 39) Saint-Jean-de-Maurienne, France
- Height: 1.73 m (5 ft 8 in)
- Weight: 57 kg (126 lb)

Sport
- Country: France
- Sport: Ski mountaineering
Medal record
Women's ski mountaineering
Representing France
World Championships
Gold medal – first place	2017 Alpago	Team
Gold medal – first place	2019 Villars-sur-Ollon	Team
Bronze medal – third place	2019 Villars-sur-Ollon	Individual race

Lorna Bonnel (born 10 November 1986) is a French ski mountaineer. She is a two-time World Champion.

== Career ==
Bonnel competed at the 2017 World Championships and won a gold medal in the team race, along with Axelle Mollaret. She again competed at the World Championships in 2019 and won a gold medal in the team race, along with Mollaret, and won a bronze medal in the individual race. In March 2025, she competed at the 2025 World Championship of Ski Mountaineering and finished in fourth place in the team race, along with her cousin Léna Bonnel. She then competed at the 39th edition of the Pierra Menta and won all four stages of the team race, along with Mollaret.

== Personal life ==
Bonnel comes from a ski mountaineering family. She is the daughter of ski club coach Laurent, and niece of former ski mountaineer Lionel Bonnel. Her cousin's Candice and Léna, are both also ski mountaineers.
