= Archibald Walter Buckle =

English officer appointed to the Distinguished Service Order

Archibald Walter Buckle DSO & Three Bars, VD
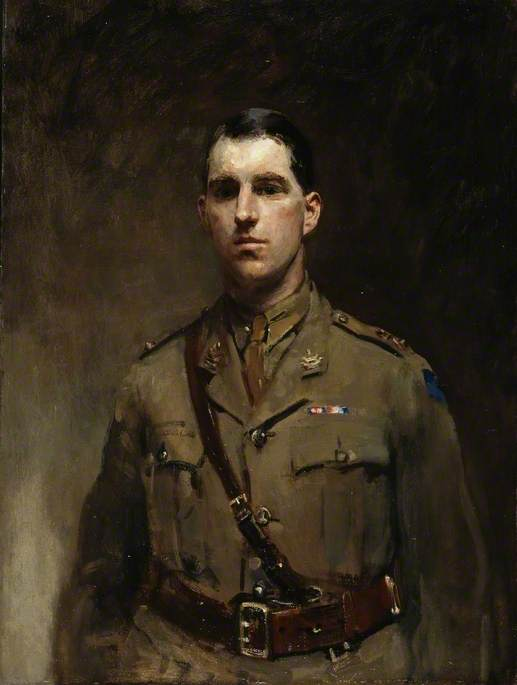
- Buckle in 1919, by Ambrose McEvoy
- Born: 16 February 1889; Chelsea, Middlesex
- Died: 6 May 1927 (aged 38); Brockley, London
- Burial place: Brockley and Ladywell Cemeteries, London
- Military career
- Allegiance: United Kingdom
- Branch: Royal Naval Volunteer Reserve
- Service years: 1908–1918
- Rank: Commander
- Commands: Anson Battalion, 63rd (Royal Naval) Division
- Conflicts: First World War: Defence of Antwerp; Somme Offensive; Battle of Arras; Third Battle of Ypres; Hundred Days Offensive
- Awards: Companion of the Distinguished Service Order & Three Bars; Mentioned in Despatches (5)
- Other work: School teacher

Commander Archibald Walter Buckle, DSO & Three Bars, VD (16 February 1889 – 6 May 1927) was a school teacher who served as an officer in the Royal Naval Volunteer Reserve (RNVR) in the First World War. He commanded the Anson Battalion in the 63rd (Royal Naval) Division in the Hundred Days Offensive in 1918, and was appointed a Companion of the Distinguished Service Order on four occasions.

== Early life ==
Buckle was born in Chelsea in the County of Middlesex, and became a school teacher at St Augustine's School in Paddington. He had joined the London Division of the RNVR in January 1908, and became a Petty Officer in 1912. He married Elsie Louise Meeks in 1914, and returned to London from his honeymoon to join his unit when the First World War broke out.

== War service ==
There was a surplus of naval personnel at the beginning of the war, and Buckle served on land with the Royal Naval Division. After service in the defence of Antwerp in September–October 1914 with the Drake Battalion, he returned to England and was commissioned as a temporary sub-lieutenant on 19 December 1914. He spent a period training men, while others in the Division were sent to fight in Gallipoli. He was promoted to temporary lieutenant on 30 March 1915 and moved to Anson Battalion. He returned to the Western Front with the 63rd (Royal Naval) Division after the War Office took over its command from the Admiralty in 1916. His unit supported the 1916 Somme Offensive. He was promoted to temporary lieutenant commander in March 1917 and served at the Battle of Arras in April 1917 and then in Belgium in the Third Battle of Ypres (Passchendaele) in late 1917. He eventually promoted to temporary commander in March 1918, and commanded the Anson Battalion in the Hundred Days Offensive in 1918.

He was appointed a Companion of the Distinguished Service Order with three bars for his actions in 1917–18, and mentioned in despatches five times. His first DSO was gazetted on 4 March 1918, for actions in December 1917 in recapturing the strategic position of Welsh Ridge, near Masnières and Marcoing. He was awarded his first Bar on 26 July 1918, for organising a counter-attack in March 1918 near Mesni; a second Bar on 11 January 1919, for actions in August 1918 on the advance from Heudecourt; and a third Bar on 8 March 1919, for actions in October 1918 near Niergnies. It was later suggested in The Times that he had been considered for award of the Victoria Cross.

== Later life ==
Buckle returned to teach in Brockley after the war, and became headmaster of the London County Council school on Rotherhithe New Road. He suffered three war wounds, which were said to have contributed towards his death aged 38, after a scratch to his arm became infected. He was survived by his wife and their three children.

Buckle's medals—the DSO and three Bars, the trio of the 1914 Star (awarded for service when he was a petty officer), the British War Medal, the Victory Medal (known as "Pip, Squeak and Wilfred"), and his RNVR Long Service and Good Conduct Medal—are held by the Imperial War Museum, along with a portrait by Ambrose McEvoy.
