= Lionel Bonnel =

French ski mountaineer (born 1966)

Personal information
- Born: 26 September 1966 (age 59)

Sport
- Sport: Skiing
- Club: Club Alpin Français

Lionel Bonnel (born 26 September 1966) is a French ski mountaineer and skiing instructor.

== Career ==
Bonnel is a member of the Club Alpin Français, holds the Chamonix-Zermatt Haute Route record with Stéphane Brosse, in 21h11'

== Personal life ==
Bonnel is married with three children, and lives in Saint-Jean-de-Maurienne. His niece, Lorna Bonnel, is also a ski mountaineer.

== Selected results ==
- 2006:
  - 9th (and 4th in "Seniors I" class ranking), Patrouille des Glaciers (together with Alain Premat and Sébastien Baud)
- 2007:
  - 7th, Trofeo Mezzalama (together with Fabien Anselmet and Sébastien Baud)

=== Pierra Menta ===
- 1993: 10th, together with Patrick Lambert
- 1994: 6th, together with Patrick Lambert
- 1997: 8th, together with Patrick Lambert
- 1998: 10th, together with Michel Sibuet Becquet
- 2005: 10th, together with Daniel Degabai
