= Dawn Bonnell =

American scientist

Dawn Austin Bonnell
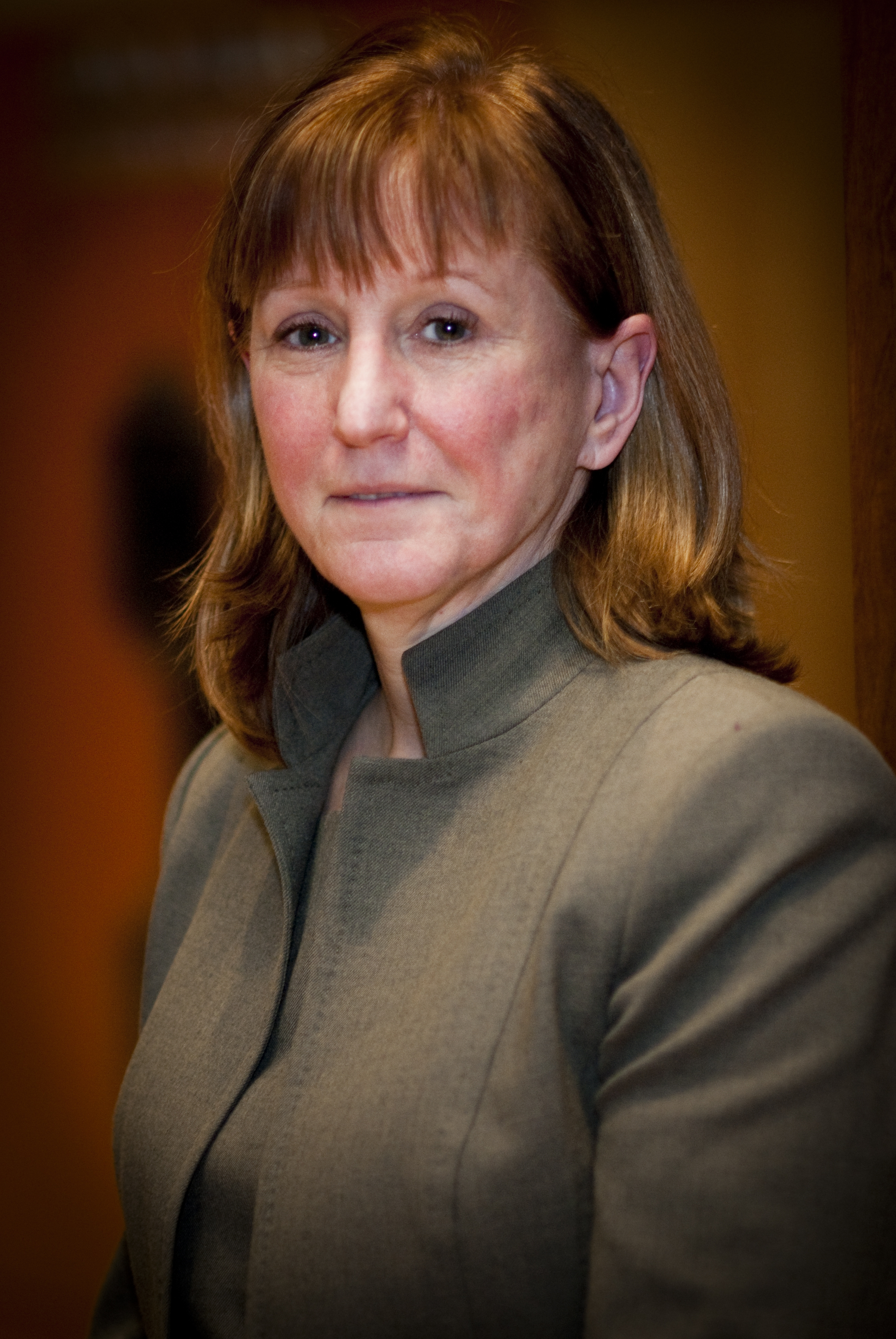
- Education: University of Michigan (BS, MS, PhD)
- Scientific career
- Workplaces: University of Pennsylvania; Thomas J. Watson Research Center
- Thesis: Determination of crystallization mechanisms and correlation of grain boundary morphology to mechanical properties in silicon-nitride (microstructure, transmission electron microscopy, mechanical properties). (1986)

Dawn Austin Bonnell is the Senior Vice Provost for Research at the University of Pennsylvania. She has previously served as the Founding Director of the National Science Foundation Nano–Bio Interface Center, Vice President of the American Ceramic Society and President of the American Vacuum Society. In 2024, she was elected to the American Philosophical Society.

== Early life and education ==
Bonnell grew up in suburban Detroit. She was the eldest of four children. She deferred applying to college until she had started her own family, but, seven years later, found herself a single mother in need of more education to support her own children. At the time Bonnell lived next door to the University of Michigan, and eventually applied to study there. Bonnell specialized in materials science and engineering at the University of Michigan. Bonnell particularly enjoyed the chemistry aspects of her introductory science courses. She earned her bachelor's degree in 1983 and her PhD under the supervision of Tseng-Ying Tien in 1986. Her doctoral research involved identifying stable phases of silicon nitride systems, with a focus on improving the mechanical properties at high temperature. She spent a year at the Max Planck Institute for Solid State Research – with her two children – where she worked with Manfred Ruehle on electron microscopy. She was a postdoctoral scholar at the Thomas J. Watson Research Center. The research centre was home to the first scanning tunnelling microscope, and Bonnell appreciated the potential of scanning tunnelling microscopy as a means to accelerate our understanding of ceramics.

== Research and career ==
In 1988 Bonnell joined the faculty of the University of Pennsylvania. Her research has involved investigations into the structure-property relations of ceramic materials as well as studies into how the surface morphology impacts chemical reactions. Her research group were the first to successfully image oxide surfaces with atomic resolution, which they achieved using scanning probe microscopy. She has also investigated ferroelectric compounds, synthetic proteins and quantum dots. The ability to visualize the atomic structure of surfaces and interfaces, and has applications in catalysis, biosensing and nanofabrication.

In 2004 Bonnell founded the University of Pennsylvania Nano/Bio Interface Center (NBIC), which supports collaboration between researchers working at the intersection of biology, chemistry and technology. As part of NBIC, Bonnell developed a new nanotechnology program for undergraduate students at the University of Pennsylvania. NBIC is home to several scanning probe-equipment facilities, and can support research in the life sciences as well as emerging technologies.

Bonnell was made Vice Provost for Research in 2013. She was also elected a member of the National Academy of Engineering in 2013 for the development of atomic-resolution surface probes, and for institutional leadership in nanoscience.

== Awards and honours ==
- National Science Foundation Presidential Young Investigator Award
- American Ceramic Society Robert B. Sosman Award
- American Ceramic Society Ross Coffin Purdy Award
- University of Michigan Distinguished Alumni Award
- American Ceramic Society Distinguished Member
- George H. Heilmeier Award for Excellence in Faculty Research
- Elected Fellow of the American Association for the Advancement of Science
- Elected Fellow of the American Ceramic Society
- Elected to the National Academy of Engineering
- Elected Fellow of the Materials Research Society
- ETH Zürich Staudinger-Durrer Medal

== Selected publications ==
- Imaging mechanism of piezoresponse force microscopy of ferroelectric surfaces (DOI:10.1103/PhysRevB.65.125408)
- Local potential and polarization screening on ferroelectric surfaces (DOI:10.1103/PhysRevB.63.125411)
- Local impedance imaging and spectroscopy of polycrystalline ZnO using contact atomic force microscopy (DOI:10.1063/1.1561168)
- Bonnell, Dawn (2001). Scanning Probe Microscopy and Spectroscopy: Theory, Techniques, and Applications. Wiley-Blackwell. ISBN 978-0-471-24824-8.
- Bonnell, Dawn (2013). Scanning Probe Microscopy For Energy Research: Materials, Devices And Applications. World Scientific Publishing. ISBN 978-981-4434-70-6.
