= Jordan Bonel =

French troubadour

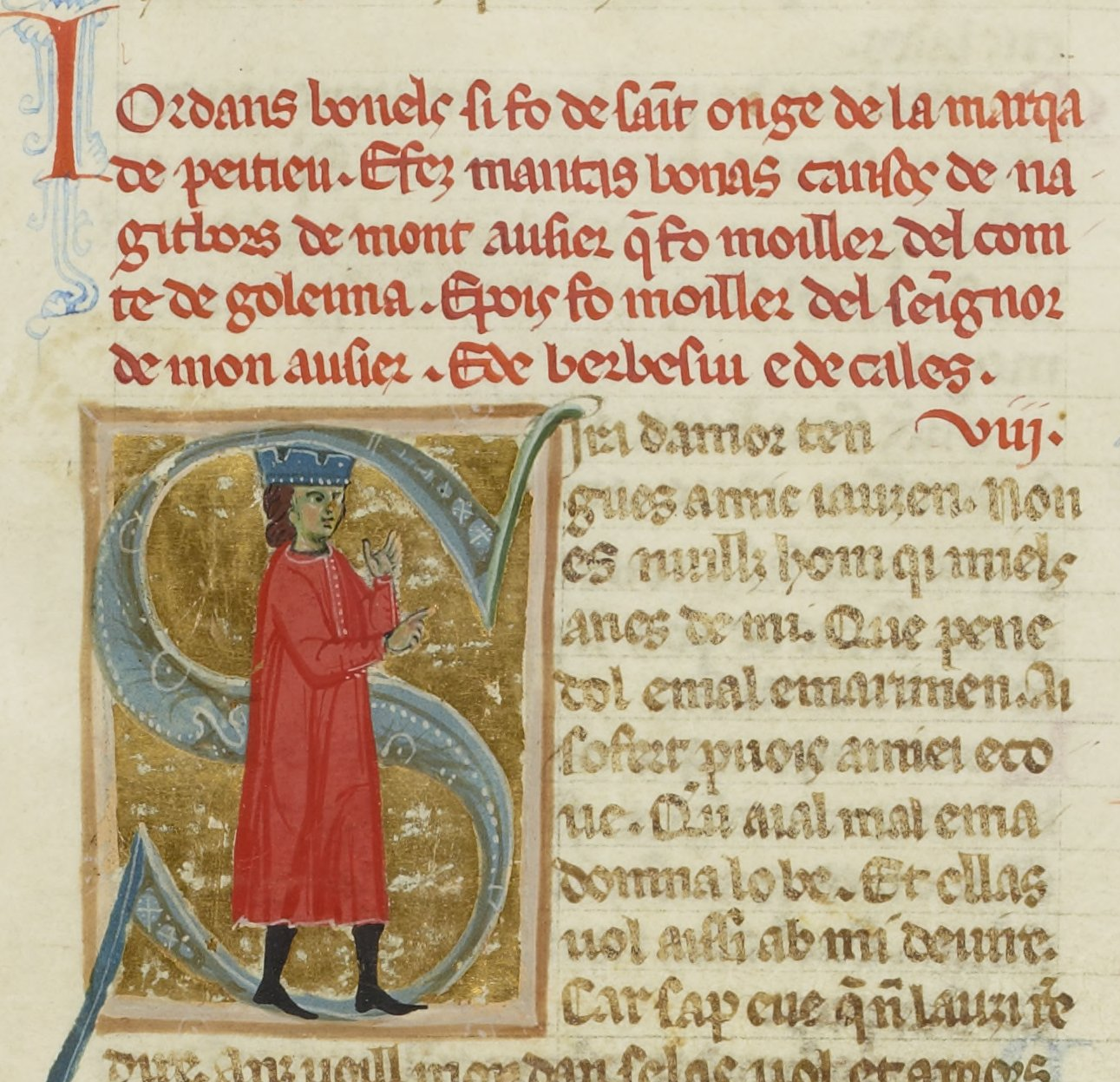
Jordan Bonel (Iordans Bonels at top) as depicted in MS 854, folio 121v in the Bibliothèque Nationale de France (BnF).

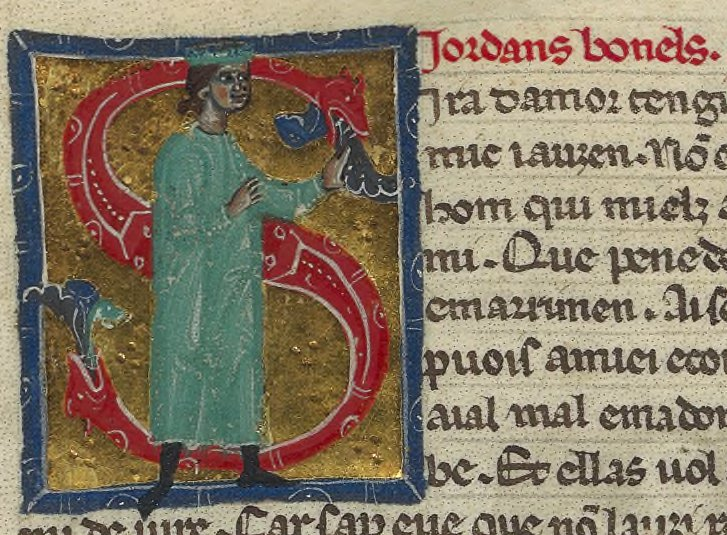
Jordan Bonel as depicted in MS 12473, folio 102v in the BnF.

Jordan Bonel, sometimes also de Confolens (fl. late 12th century), was a troubadour from western Aquitaine about whom very little is definitively known except that he was associated with the court of Alfonso II of Aragon. His vida states that he was from Saintonge and he appears to have been contemporary with Bertran de Born. His surviving corpus probably consists of three cansos, wherein only one is attributed to him, though its melody survives:

S'ira d'amor tengués amic gaudent,
non fora cel que mièlhs amès de me;
car pena e dòl e dams e marriment
ai sofertat longament; e'l conven
qu'ieu aja'l mal e ma domna lo ben.
E pos aissí li plai amb me de vire,
qu'ar sap e crei que non l'ausi redire,
vuèlh tot sofrir s'ela'l vòl et Amors:
gardatz s'ieu sui dels fenhents amadors!

The melody has similar to those of Arnaut de Maruelh, but is rather conservative when compared with his more illustrious contemporaries. It is in AAB form with musical rhymes at the cadences.

One of Jordan's cansos is said to refer to the Holy Land by Linda Paterson, though neither she nor Kurt Lewent classifies it as a "crusading song". The poem actually refers to Edessa as representing the far reaches of the earth. The same song celebrates Guiborc de Montausier, the "viscountess" of Chalais (Chales or Chaletz):

A Chales vai, chansos, a midons dire,
A Na Guiborc cui beutatz saup eslire
E pretz e jois e largues' e valors,
Qe a leis mi clam de sos mals noiridors.
