= Jim Bonella =

Australian rules footballer

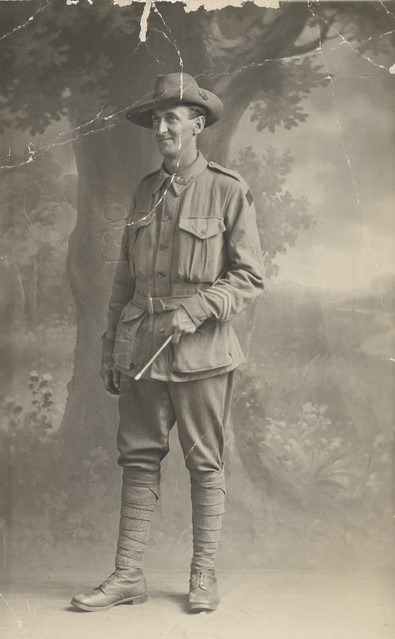
- Born: James Henry Bonella; 17 December 1884; Maldon, Victoria
- Died: 24 May 1918 (aged 33); Étaples, France
- Military service
- Allegiance: Australia
- Branch: Australian Army
- Service years: 1915 – 1918
- Rank: Private
- Service number: 98
- Units: 2nd Battalion; 21st Battalion
Australian rules football career
Personal information
- Original team: Pembroke
Playing career^{1}
Years	Club	Games (Goals)
1908	Melbourne	1 (0)
- ^{1} Playing statistics correct to the end of 1908.

James Henry Bonella (17 December 1884 – 24 May 1918) was an Australian rules footballer who played with Melbourne in the Victorian Football League (VFL), under the name of Jim Bonelli.

He died of gunshot wounds received whilst on active service in France during World War I. He was remembered as being very popular, and "a cheery soul".

== Early life ==
The son of Pietro Egidio "Peter" Bonelli (1844–1888), (Note: Name: Bonilla. Father Pietro died at Kew Mental Hospital on 17 August 1888, his death (due to "brain disease") was registered under the name of "Peter Bonilla".) and Margaret née Williams (1850–1928), (Note: Name: Bonella. At the time of her death, she was known as "Bonella".) James Henry Bonelli (Note: His father and mother were variously recorded as "Bonelli" and "Bonella", and James' birth (in 1885), his marriage (in 1912), and his son's birth (in 1913) were officially recorded with the family name "Bonelli".) was born at Maldon, Victoria on 17 December 1884.

He married Eliza 'Lila' Puncher (1885–1968) in 1912. They had one son, James Avenel 'Arie' Bonella (1913–2002). (Note: Son Arie went onto enlist in World War II with Signals, with service number VX138567.)

Eliza's brother and Jim's brother-in-law, Private James Samuel Puncher (regimental number 482) was killed in action in France on 21 November 1916, serving with the 21st Battalion. He is buried at the AIF Burial Grounds north of Flers, Somme, France.

== Football career ==
Bonella played in the Victorian Junior Association with Pembroke Football Club, South Melbourne, which was formed about 1889. It was noted in the game against Yarraville in August 1908, "if this player would only play more to his club mates, and not run so much, he would be one of the finest juniors playing".

Recruited from Pembroke, he played one senior match for the Melbourne Football Club, in the last match of the season, on a very muddy ground, against Fitzroy, at the Brunswick Street Oval on 5 September 1908.

There had been a two-week break between rounds 17 and 18 due to the 1908 Melbourne Carnival. Melbourne's Dick Fowler, recruited from Caulfield Grammar School, and Fitzroy's Tom Norton, recruited from Hawthorn, also played their first and only senior VFL matches on that day.

Bonella returned to Pembroke, and played for them in 1909, where in one May game he was given to have "played brilliant football".

== Military service ==
Working as a picture-framer, Bonella enlisted in the First Australian Imperial Force on 18 January 1915. At time of enlistment aged 31, he was given to be 5 feet 5.75 inches (1.67 m) height, 123 pounds (56 kg) weight, and a chest of 34 inches (86 cm).

Embarking from Melbourne, Victoria, on HMAT Ulysses (A38) on 10 May 1915, he served overseas as a private in the 2nd Battalion, Australian Machine Gun Corps. He was on the HMAT Southland when it was torpedoed in the Aegean Sea on 2 September 1915.

== Death ==
After three years active service in Gallipoli, Egypt, and France, at the time of the German spring offensive, Bonella was severely wounded in his left thigh, whilst in action with the 21st Battalion, A Company, on 20 May 1918. He was evacuated to a military hospital. Although he had been successfully operated upon on 21 May 1918, he died of his wounds on 24 May 1918.

Bonella is buried in section LXVIII (68), row D, grave 11 of Étaples Military Cemetery, northwest France.

== See also ==
- List of Victorian Football League players who died on active service

== Sources ==
- World War One Embarkation Roll: Private James Henry Bonella (98), collection of the Australian War Memorial.
- World War One Nominal Roll: Private James Henry Bonella (98), collection of the Australian War Memorial.
- World War One Service Record: Private James Henry Bonella (98), Australian National Archives.
- Red Cross Wounded and Missing Records: Private James Henry Bonella (98), collection of the Australian War Memorial.
- Roll of Honour Circular: Private James Henry Bonella (98), collection of the Australian War Memorial.
- Roll of Honour: Private James Henry Bonella (98), Australian War Memorial.
- Australian Casualties: Victorian List No.409, Died of Wounds – (Bonella, J.M, West Brunswick, 24/5/18), The Argus, (Monday, 17 June 1918), p.7.
- James Henry Bonella (98), The AIF Project, UNSW Canberra.
