= Harvard University Marshal =

Harvard University's chief protocol officer

The University Marshal is Harvard University's chief protocol officer. Among other duties, the University Marshal often receives visitors on behalf of Harvard's President. The Marshal's Office reports to the President and organizes such large-scale, University-wide events as presidential inaugurations, anniversary celebrations, and special convocations, as well as overseeing the Morning Exercises on Commencement Day.

Harvard's first was Morris Hicky Morgan, appointed "Marshal of the Commencement Exercises" in 1896.

== Sources ==
- "Harvard University. Office of the University Marshal". The President and Fellows of Harvard College.
