= History and traditions of Harvard commencements =

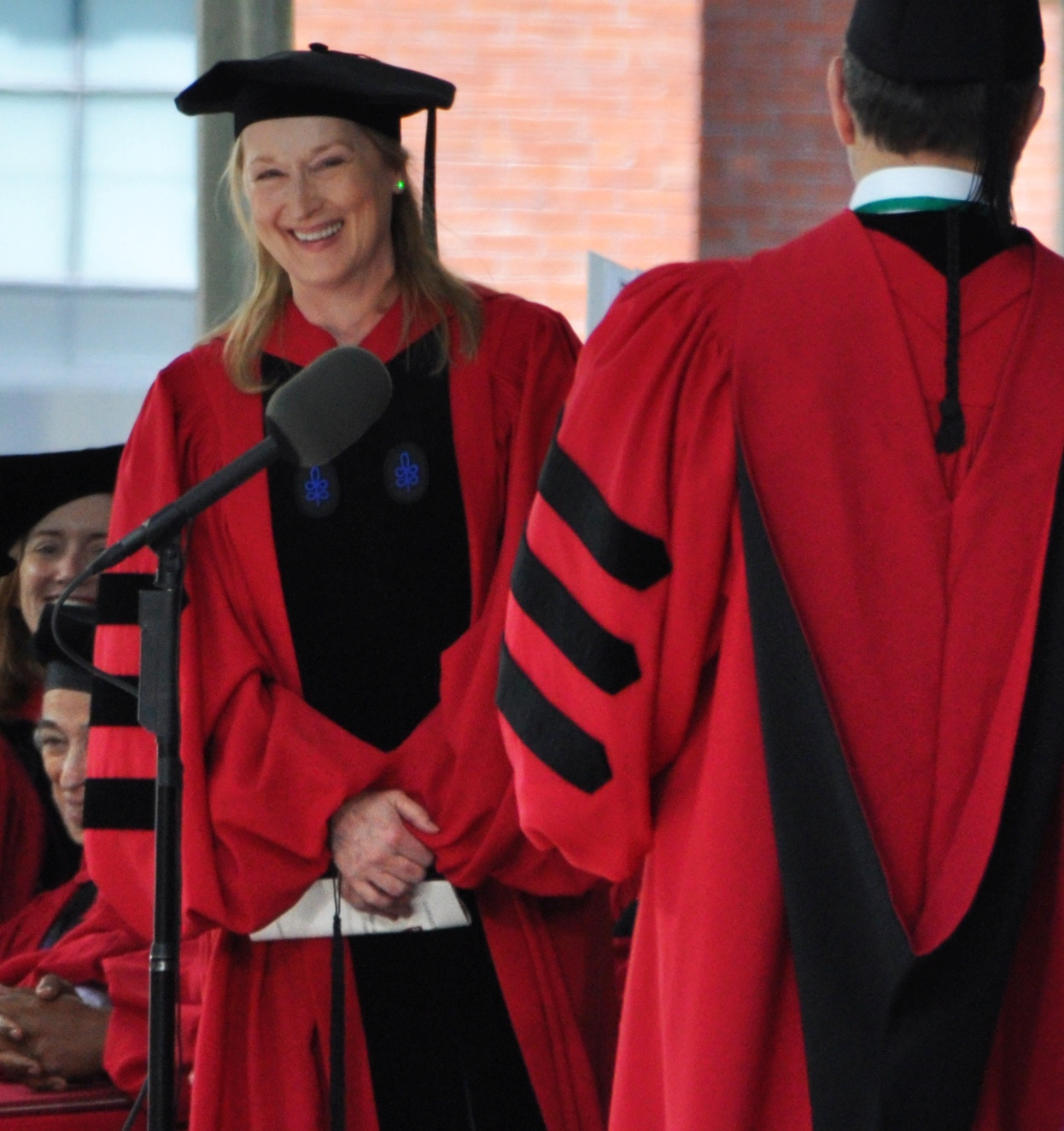
Meryl Streep, Hon. D.A. 2010

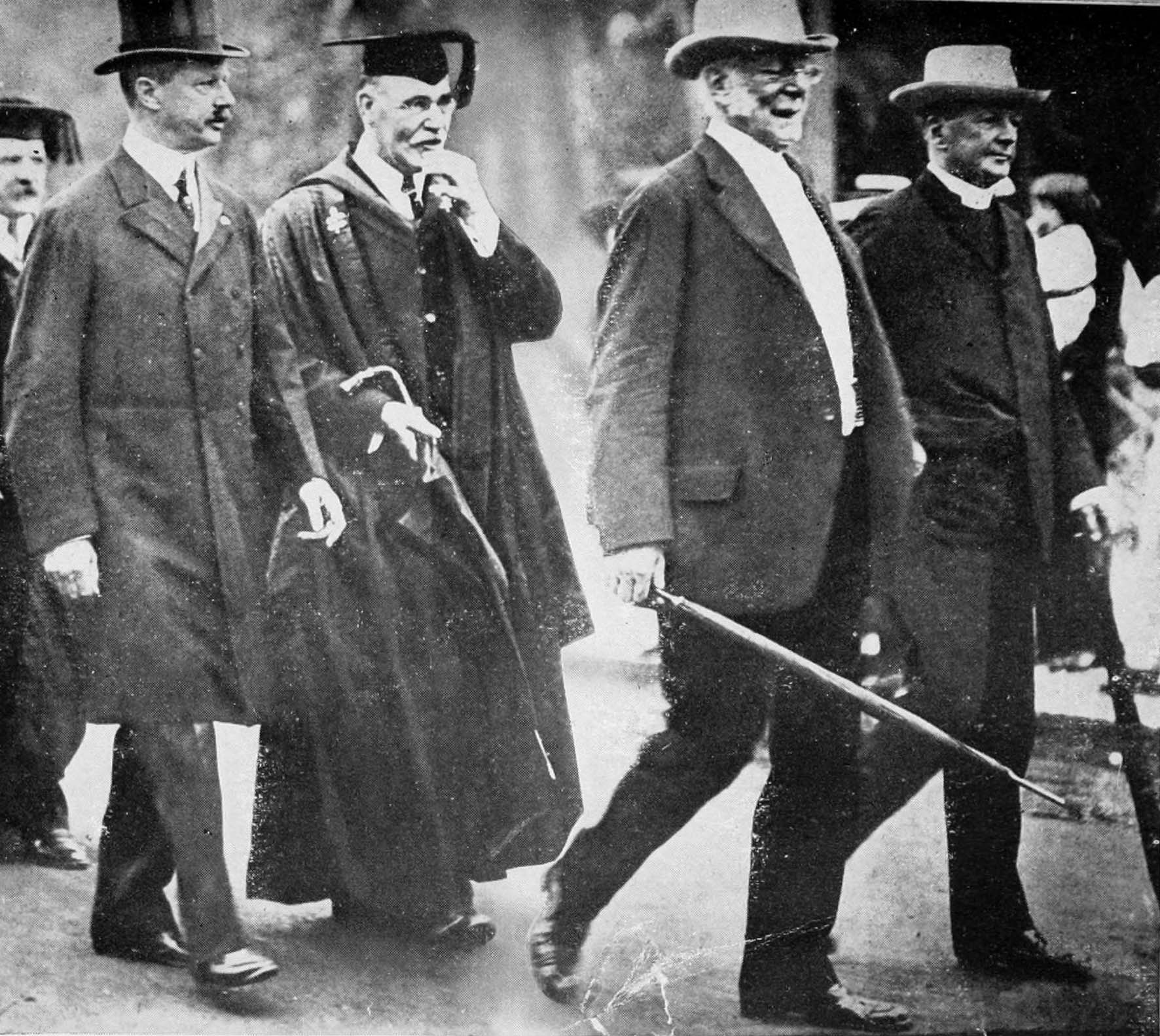
(l-r) US Navy Secretary (and Harvard Overseer) George Meyer; Prof. Frank W. Taussig; Pres. Eliot (who disdained academic regalia); Bishop (and Overseer) William Lawrence (1911)

What was originally called Harvard Colledge (Note: Charter of the President and Fellows of Harvard College) (around which Harvard University eventually grew) held its first Commencement in September 1642, when nine degrees were conferred. Today some 1700 undergraduate degrees, and 5000 advanced degrees from the university's various graduate and professional schools, are conferred each Commencement Day.

As of 2024, each degree candidate attends two ceremonies: the Morning Exercises, at which degrees are conferred verbally en masse; a smaller midday ceremony (at the candidate's professional or graduate school, or undergraduate House) at which diplomas are given in hand.

The ceremonies shifted from late summer to late June in the nineteenth century, (Note: "The first Commencement took place in 1642," noted Harvard's Commencement director in 2007. "The difference between 365 years and 356 commencements is accounted for by wars and plagues that cancelled the event.") and are now held at the end of May. A number of unusual traditions have attached to them over the centuries, including the arrival of certain dignitaries on horseback, occupancy by Harvard's president of the Holyoke Chair (a "bizarre" sixteenth-century contraption prone to tipping over) and the welcoming of newly minted bachelors to "the fellowship of educated men and women."

== Commencement week ==
Harvard's Commencement Day, on which degrees are conferred, is the highlight of several days of events such as receptions, dinners, concerts, literary exercises, miscellaneous ceremonies, a baccalaureate service, and Class Day events..

The annual meeting of the Harvard Alumni Association, long convened on the afternoon of Commencement Day, was moved in 2022 to the week following.

== Class Day ==
The annual Class Day celebration occurs the day before Commencement.

== Daybreak rituals ==
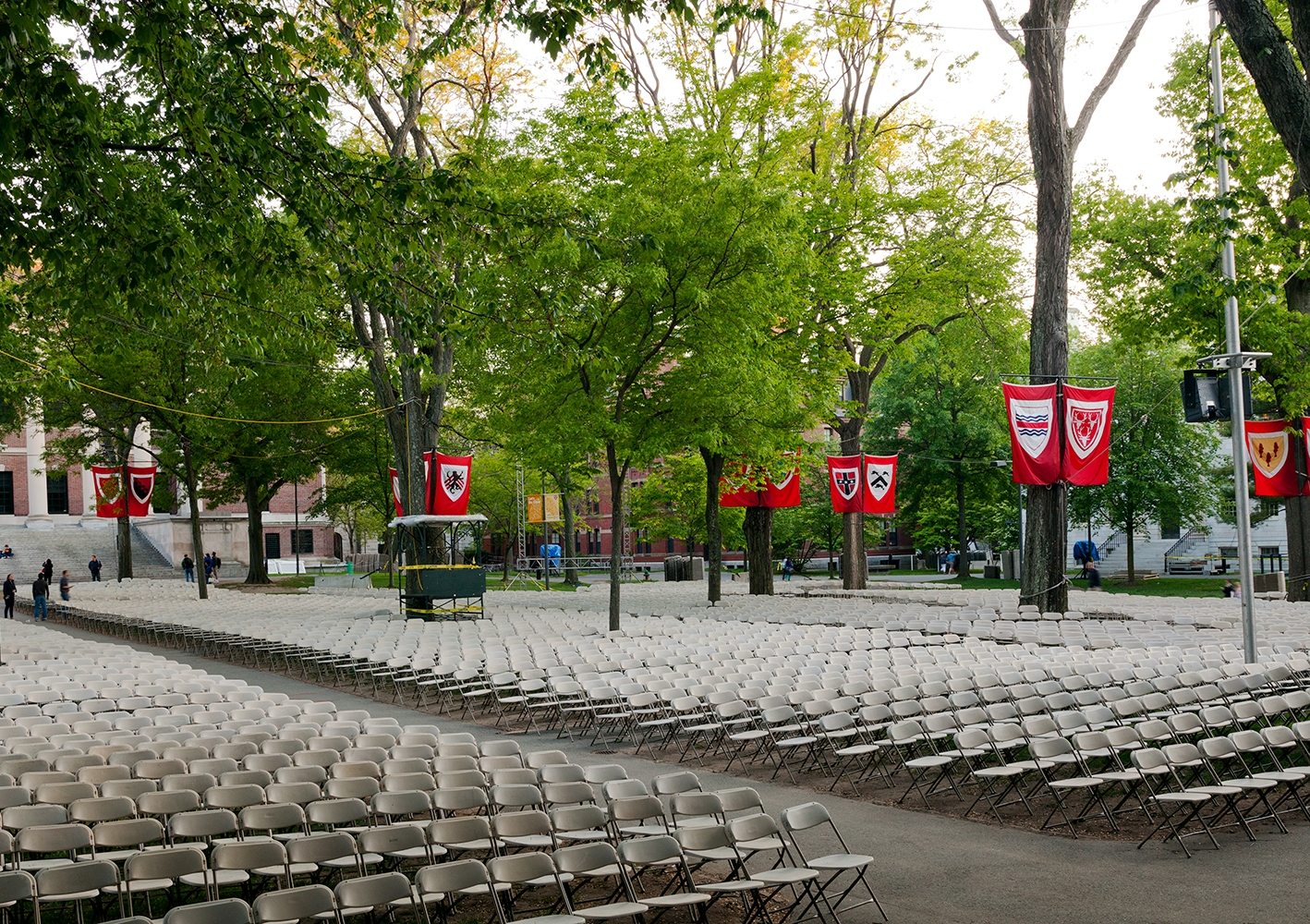
Seating for degree candidates in Tercentenary Theatre, with banners displaying arms of the various graduate and professional schools, and upperclass houses. Beyond the trees are the columns of Widener Library.

Most upperclass Houses have preliminary rituals of their own. At Lowell House, for example, a perambulating bagpiper alerts seniors at 6:15 am for a 6:30 breakfast in the House dining hall with members of the Senior Common Room, after which all process (along with members of Eliot House, who have been similarly roused) to Memorial Church for a chapel service at 7:45. (Note: "Yard Ceremony". Lowell House.)

== Morning exercises ==
Morning Exercises are held in the central green of Harvard Yard (known as Tercentenary Theatre); the dais is before the steps of Memorial Church, facing Widener Library. (Note: Early commencements were held in a variety of locations, all indoors. They were held in Sanders Theatre from 1874 until 1916, when they were moved to Harvard Stadium; in 1922 they were moved to their present venue.) Some 32,000 people attend the event, including university officials, civic dignitaries, faculty, honorees, alumni, family and guests. Degree candidates wear cap and gown or other academic regalia (see Academic regalia of Harvard University).

=== Academic Parade ===
The first to enter are candidates for graduate and professional degrees, followed by alumni and alumnae. Candidates for undergraduate degrees enter next, traditionally removing headgear as they pass the John Harvard statue en route. Finally comes the President's Procession, as follows:

- the sheriffs of Middlesex and Suffolk counties (Note: The governor and sheriffs are among several public officials, not otherwise affiliated with Harvard, who have long taken part in the ceremonies. By tradition the Middlesex Sheriff closes the ceremony by crying, "The meeting is adjourned," though in 1997 Sheriff James DiPaola, "in his first Harvard Commencement and clearly enjoying his role, wanted more lines. At the end he boomed, 'Marshal ! As the sheriff of Middlesex County, I have news! The meeting is adjourned ! '" Not all outside participants have been wholeheartedly enthusiastic. In the 1930s Governor Paul Dever, to the chagrin of Harvard officials and alumni, shunned the prescribed morning coat for a regular tuxedo and straw hat, and Governor James Michael Curley appeared in silk stockings, knee britches, powdered wig, and a tricorn hat with plume. (When challenged by Harvard officials‍—‌"the story goes", according to the Harvard Crimson‍—‌Curley produced the Massachusetts Bay Colony's statutes covering Harvard Commencement dress, and on the basis of its authority claimed to be the only person present who was properly attired.) In 1970 Middlesex Sheriff John J. Buckley objected to the traditional costume he would be required to wear. After Suffolk Sheriff Thomas S. Eisenstadt was asked to open and close in Buckley's stead, Cambridge mayor Alfred Vellucci mused, "Now I see they're going to have Tom Eisenstadt march with the sword. Where is he going to get a sword unless he borrows one from the Don Juan Drum and Bugle Corps?" (The Don Juan Drum an Bugle Corps – now inactive – was a competitive junior drum and bugle corps founded by Vellucci and his wife in 1965.)) (who have earlier entered the Yard‍—‌in morning coats, top hats, and striped pants with swords and scabbards‍—‌through the Johnston Gate, riding white horses);
- the University Marshal, (Note: "[Morris Hicky Morgan] was the first regular University Marshal, with the title of Marshal of Commencement from 1896 to 1908 and of University Marshal until his death in March 1910. A Chief Marshal had been appointed for the Bicentennial Celebration in 1836 and for the 250th Celebration in 1886. It has not been discovered who ran ordinary academic exercises before 1896; probably an ad hoc Marshal was appointed," wrote Mason Hammond in the Harvard Library bulletin.) escorting the President and any former Harvard presidents in attendance;
- the Fellows of Harvard College;
- the Honorable and Reverend the Board of Overseers;
- the Governor of the Commonwealth of Massachusetts (who as of 1971 no longer arrives on horseback with armed, mounted escorts); (Note: "As recently as Francis Sargent's 1970 attendance, the Governor of Massachusetts traditionally arrived at Commencement with 17th-century mounted, scarlet-coated guard, which escorted him from the State House to the Johnston Gate. The guard bore pikes, somewhat less useful today than when Governor Thomas Dudley rode to the first Commencement despite warnings of possible ambush by Indians.")
- candidates for honorary degrees (whose identities are announced only on the day itself) with their faculty escorts;
- the sundry deans and vice-presidents of the university;
- the faculty, according to rank;
- remaining officers of the university;
- former Fellows and Overseers, former faculty, former officers of the alumni/alumnae associations;
- the Phi Beta Kappa President and Orator;
- the Trustee of The Charity of Edward Hopkins;
- the "teaching elders [ministers] of the sixe [historically] next adjoining townes, that is Cambridge, Watertowne, Charlestowne, Boston, Roxberry, and Dorchester", and clergy of the "Old Cambridge" churches;
- consuls to Boston;
- state and federal judges;
- past recipients of honorary degrees;
- public officials;
- other guests.

=== Holyoke Chair ===
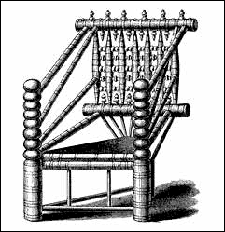
The "bizarre" Holyoke Chair, reserved for Harvard's president

At Cambridge. Is kept in the College there.
Seems but little the worse for wear.
That's remarkable when I say
It was old in President Holyoke's day.

— Oliver Wendell Holmes (1858)

On the dais the President occupies the Holyoke Chair, an uncomfortable and treacherous Elizabethan turned chair reserved for such ceremonies since at least 1770 (when it was already some two hundred years old). Called "bizarre ... with a complex frame and top-heavy superstructure", its "square framework set on the single rear post makes [it] tip over easily to either side." A stabilizing "fin" was added at the rear sometime in the 20th century.

"It was just uncomfortable. I don’t know how to describe it," recalled Derek Bok, Harvard's 25th president (1971–1991), whose mother embroidered a "much-needed" cushion for use with it. Said the Harvard Gazette in 2007:

When the chair holds its robed occupant, onlookers cannot detect the odd geometry by which its triangular seat points toward a square back rippling with knobby dowels and finials. Perhaps by striking their own precarious balance in this strange seat of authority, the successors of Edward Holyoke [Harvard's president 1737–1769] come to sense what the job is all about. (Note: Measuring 46.5 in (118 cm) high and 32.5 in (83 cm) wide, its seat about 20 inches (51 cm) from the floor and about as deep, the Holyoke Chair is thought to have been made in England or Wales between 1550 and 1600. "[A] display of virtuoso turning," it was bought for Harvard by Holyoke, who saw it as "suitable to the authority of the president and establishing an iconographic link between Harvard College and its late-medieval English prototypes, Oxford and Cambridge," in the words of Jonathan Fairbanks and Robert Trent. Although the "thronelike quality [lends] an official air, [chairs of this design] were undoubtedly domestic chairs originally", and indeed (according to a 1903 New York Times article) its use by Holyoke was at first "merely as a serviceable piece of every-day furniture." Even after its first recorded ceremonial use (at the 1770 installation of President Samuel Locke) the President's Chair "used to stand in the Harvard library [Gore Hall], where, according to tradition, it gave a student the right to kiss any young woman whom he was showing through the college and who thoughtlessly sat down on it. Whether or not the privilege was often or ever taken advantage of the present generation has no means of knowing." The Fogg Museum now has custody between ceremonial uses.)

=== Ceremonies ===
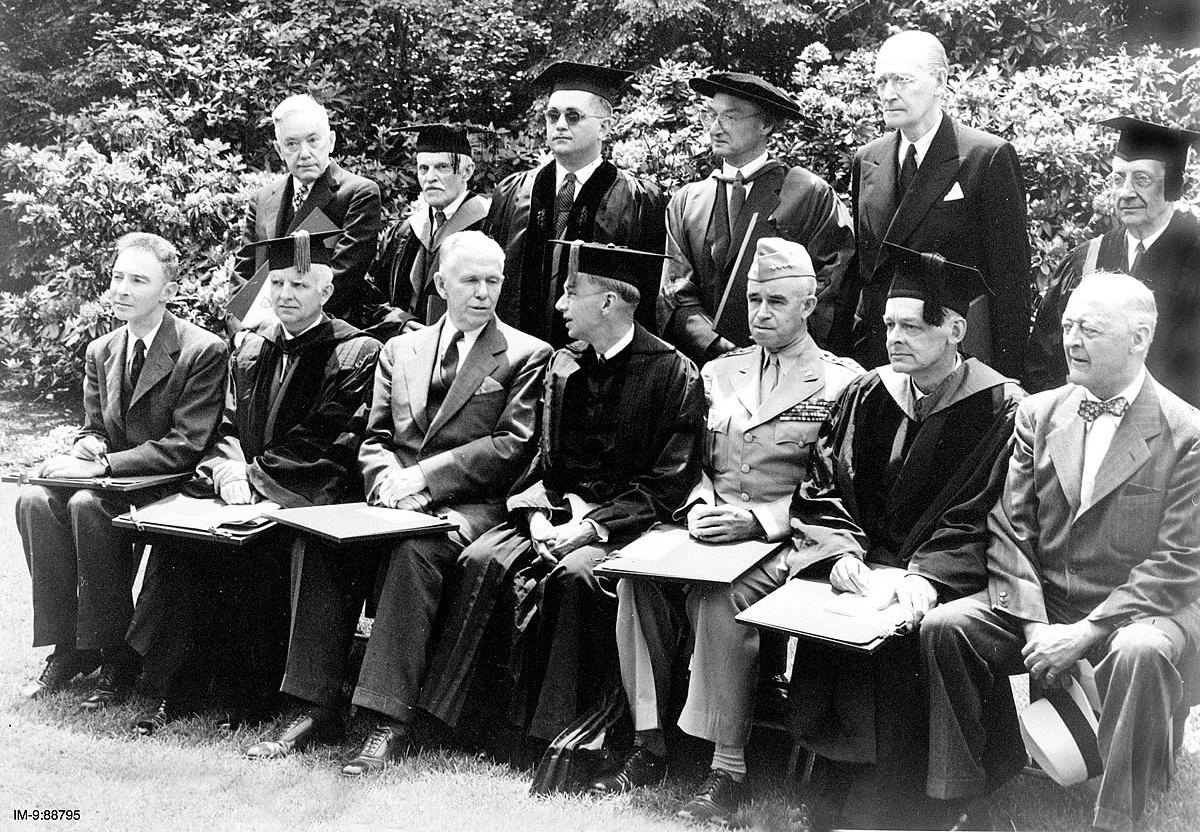
1947 honorands: J. Robert Oppenheimer (left), George C. Marshall (third left, speaking with Pres. James B. Conant), Omar N. Bradley (third right), T. S. Eliot (2nd right).

At the University Marshal's call ("Mister Sheriff, pray give us order") the Middlesex Sheriff takes to the dais, strikes it thrice with the butt of his staff, and intones, "The meeting will be in order." Three student speakers (Undergraduate English, Undergraduate Latin, and Graduate English) are introduced and deliver their addresses.

Then, according to the order in which the various graduate and professional schools were created, the dean of each school steps forward to present, en masse, that school's degree candidates. Each group stands for the President's incantation conferring their degrees, which is followed by a traditional welcome or exhortation: doctoral graduates, for example, are welcomed "to the ancient and universal company of scholars", while law graduates are reminded to "aid in the shaping and application of those wise restraints that make us free." Last to be graduated are the bachelor's candidates, who are then welcomed to "the fellowship of educated men and women."

Honorary degrees are then bestowed. Finally, all rise to sing "The Harvard Hymn", (Note: James Bradstreet Greenough; John Knowles Paine. "The Harvard Hymn".) expressing the hope (Integri sint curatores, Eruditi professores, Largiantur donatores‍—‌printed lyrics are supplied) that the trustees, faculty and benefactors will manifest (respectively) integrity, wisdom, and generosity. After a benediction is said, the Middlesex Sheriff declares the ceremony closed and the President's Procession departs.

Once the dais is clear the Harvard Band strikes up and the Memorial Church bell commences to peal, joined by bells throughout Cambridge for most of the following hour. (Note: The other participating bells are those of Lowell House, the Harvard Business School's Baker Hall, Christ Church Cambridge, the Harvard Divinity School's Andover Hall, the Church of the New Jerusalem, First Church Congregational, First Parish Unitarian Universalist, St. Paul Roman Catholic Church, St. Peter's Roman Catholic Church, University Lutheran Church, Holy Trinity Armenian Apostolic Church, North Prospect United Church of Christ, and St. Anthony's Church.)

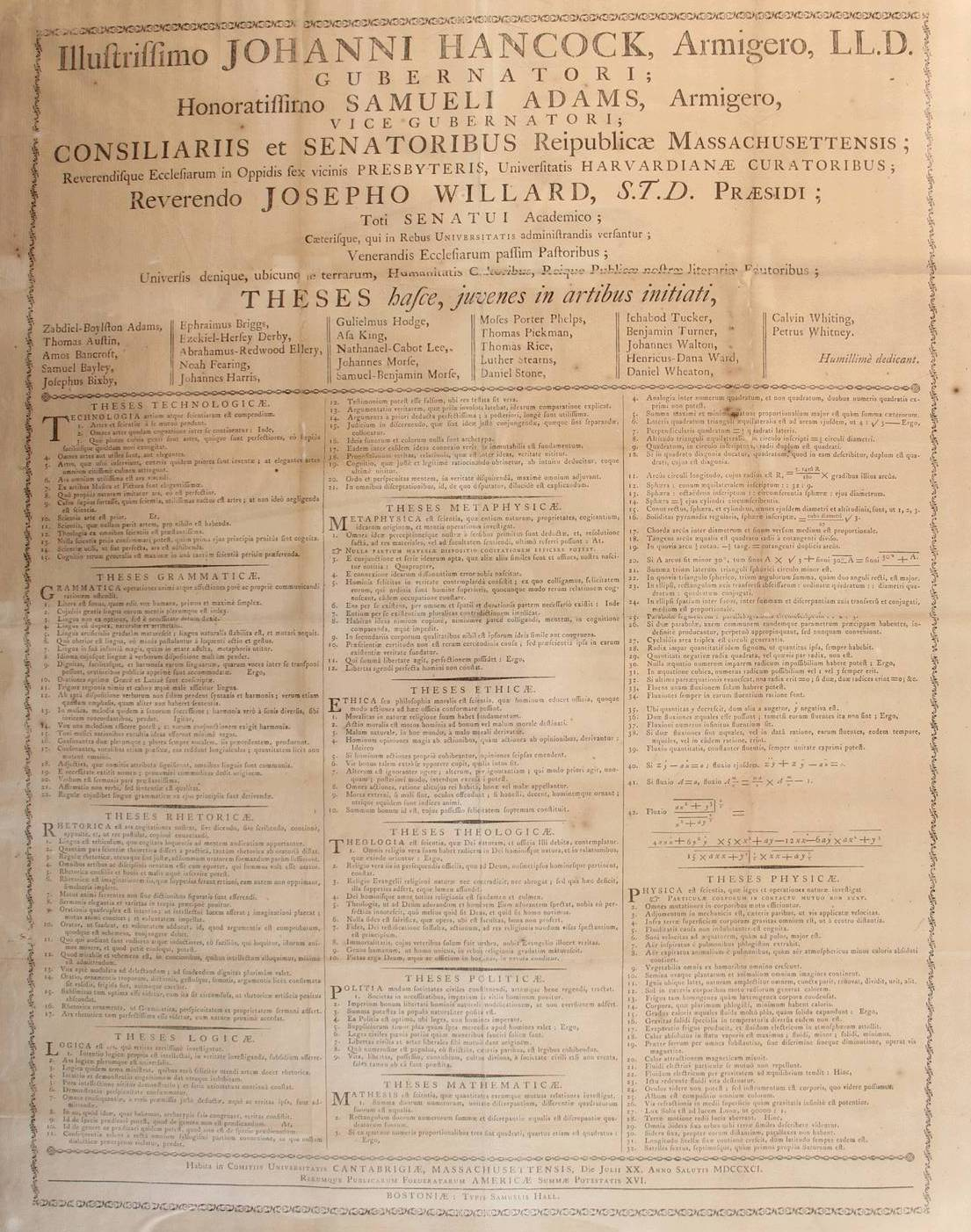
Broadside, in Latin, for 1791 exercises: "The Illustrious John Hancock, Esq., LL.D., Governor; Honorable Samuel Adams, Esq., Vice-Governor ..."

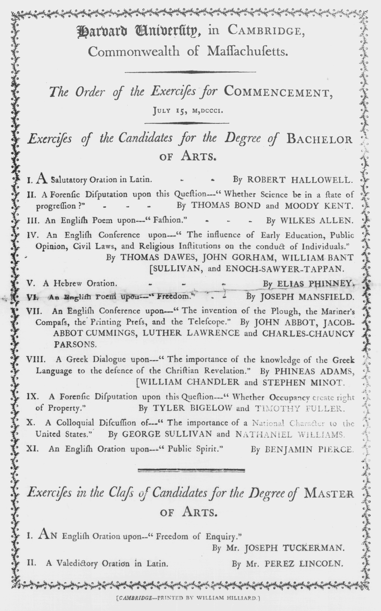
Order of the Exercises (1801) opening with "A Salutatory Oration in Latin"

== Mid-day ceremonies ==
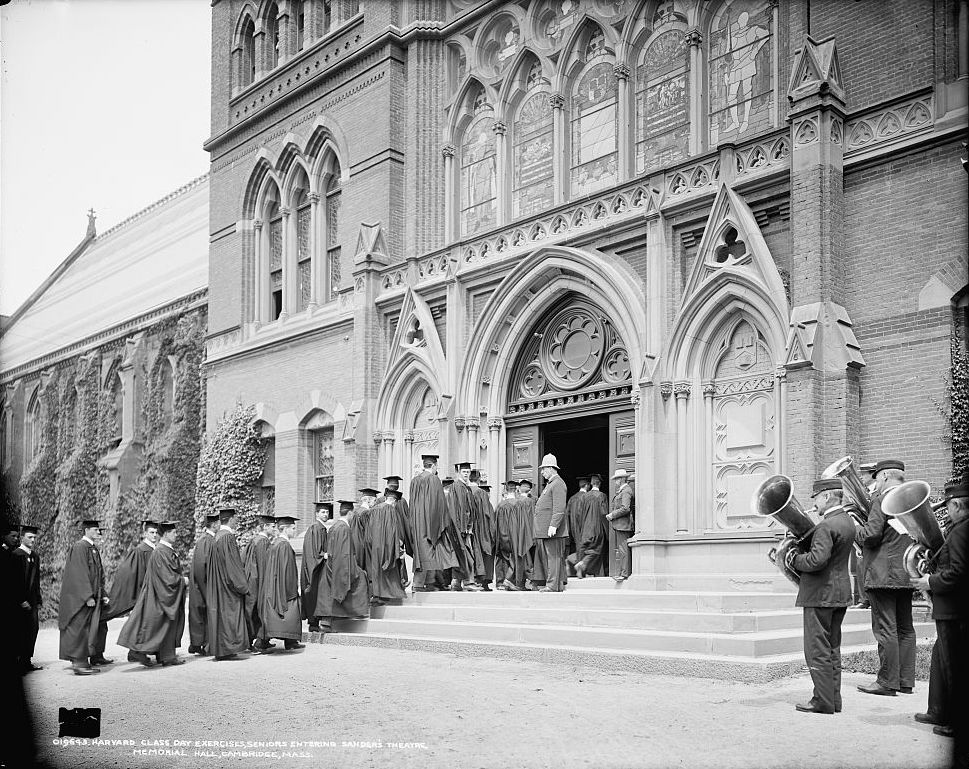
Seniors entering Sanders Theatre for Class Day exercises (late 19th or early 20th century)

After the Morning Exercises, each graduate or professional school, and each upperclass House, holds a smaller ceremony (with luncheon) at which its member-graduates are called forward by name to receive their diplomas in hand.

== Alumni Association meeting and afternoon addresses ==
For many years, at the afternoon meeting of the Harvard Alumni Association, the President and the Commencement Day speaker delivered their addresses. However, in 2022, the Alumni Association meeting was moved to a week after commencement, as cancellations during COVID "helped lead to the re-thinking about purpose and forums."

US Secretary of State (and former Army general) George C. Marshall's address at the 1947 commencement famously outlined a plan (soon known as the Marshall Plan) for the economic revival of post–World War II Europe.

== Historical notes ==
=== Sheriffs ===
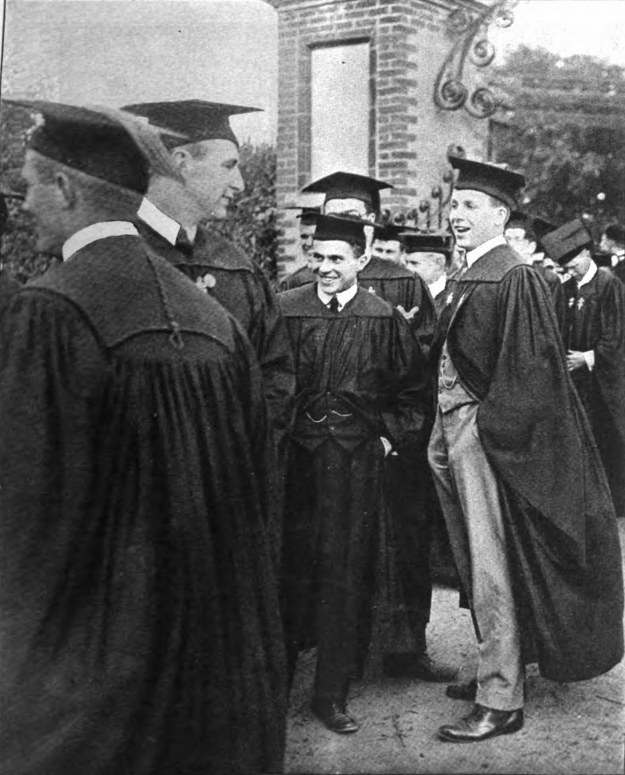
Lionel de Jersey Harvard (r) with fellow seniors, 1915

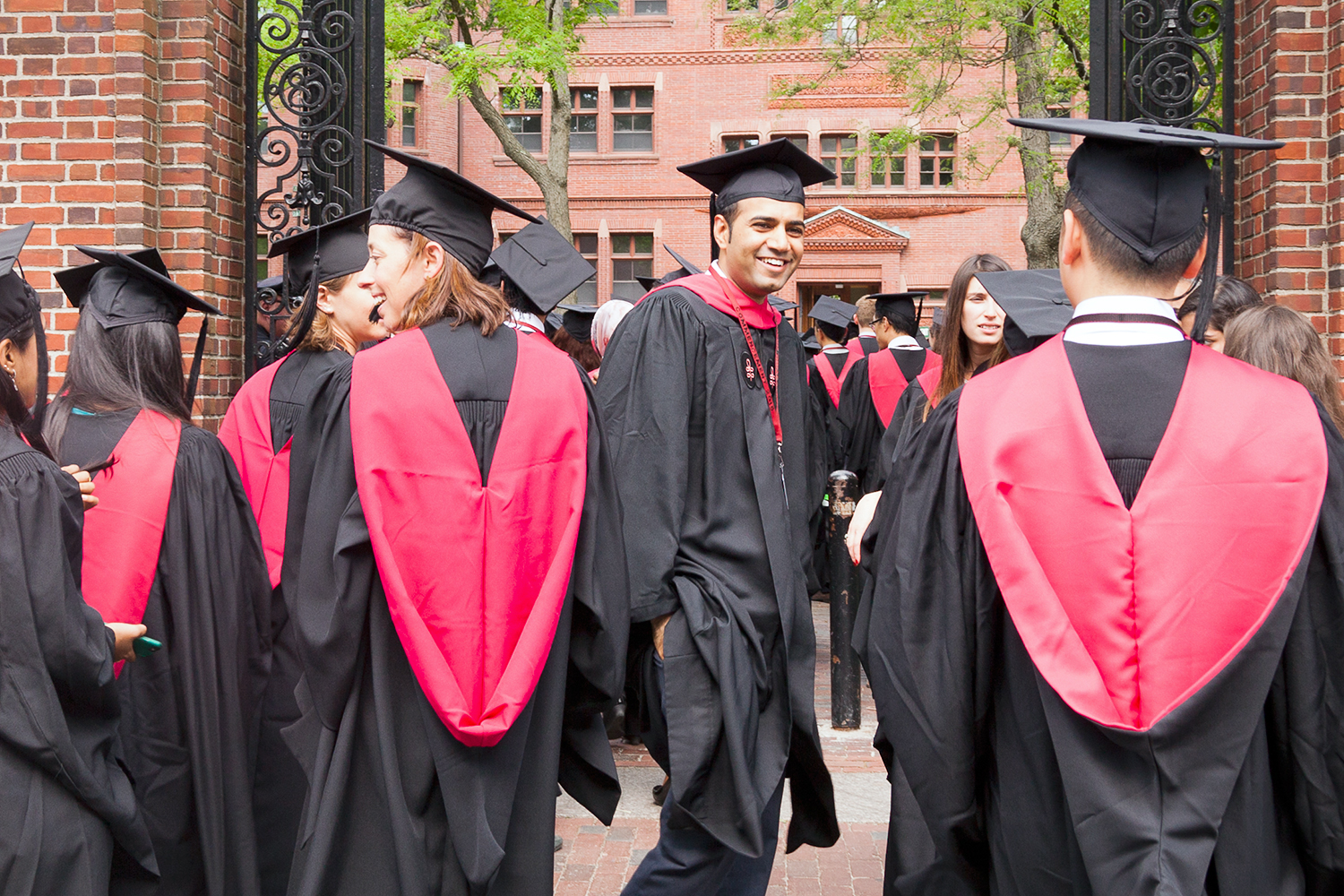
Outside Sever Gate, 2015

"Our fathers ... closely associated the thirst for learning and that for beer", a 1924 Harvard history observed, so that (a modern survey continued) the sheriffs' presence at Commencements "has a practical origin. Feasting, drinking, and merrymaking at earlier commencements often got out of hand. Fights were not unheard of", and commencements in various years have featured two-headed calves, an elephant, and Indians-versus-scholars archery competitions. Such goings-on were sufficiently common knowledge that in 1749, Bostonian William Douglass explained to a general readership that the siege and capture of Louisbourg had been "carried on in a tumultuary random Manner, and resembled a Cambridge Commencement."

Thus in 1781,

For the prevention of Disorders on Commencement day, [the Corporation] voted that the Honble Henry Gardner Esq: and the Honble Abraham Fuller Esq: Justices of the Peace thro' the State, and Loammi Baldwin Esq: Sheriff of the County of Middlesex, be requested to give their attendance on that day ...

Earlier measures had included the 1693 banning of plum cake‍—‌the enjoyment of which, officials asserted, was unknown at other universities, "dishonourable to ye Colledge, not gratefull to Wise men, and chargable to [i.e. the fault of] ye Parents". This was one of many efforts by Increase Mather (Harvard's president from 1692 to 1701) toward "Reformation of those excesses ... [of] Commencement day and weeke at the Colledge, [sic] so that I might [prevent] disorder and profaneness" ‍—‌for Harvard officials a recurring headache. (Note: In 1721, "For the preventing Extravagencies at Commencemts. [The Corporation voted] 1. That the Order ... phibiting any Scholar to have Plum-cake &c in his Study or Chamber [at] Commencement be strictly observed. 2. That all mix'd drink make with distill'd Spts be also phibited ... 3. That the Presidt and Fellows be desired to exhort & direct the Scholars to be more moderate and frugall in the Entertainmts. 4. And that the publick dinner usual on the day after Commencmt be lessen'd or laid aside, as the Presidt and Fellows of the House [i.e. the Tutors] shall think most convenient." In 1722, the Corporation "took more stringent action still": "Whereas the Countrey in general and the College in Particular have bin under Such Circumstances, as call aloud for Humiliation, and all due manifestations of it; and that a Suitable retrenchmt of every thing that has the face of Exorbitance or [extravegence] in Expences, especially at Commencmt out to be endeavrd. And Whereas the preparations & pvisions that have bin wont to be made at those ties have bin the Occasion of no Small disorders; It is Agreed, and Voted, That henceforth no preparation nor Provision either of Plumb-Cake or rosted, boiled or baked Meats & Pyes of any kind shalbe made by any Commencer, nore shal any such have any distilled Liquors, or any Composition made therewth." "These regulations proving ineffectual," in 1726 the Corporation, "having now had some Discourse about the great Disorders & Immoralities yt have attended ye Publick Commencements; it is agreed yt ye Several Members of ye Corporation will Jndeavour to think of wt may be a proper method for ye preventing of such Disorders & Immoralities ...")

=== Sartorial regulations ===
To curb unseemly sartorial displays of wealth and social status the 1807 Laws of Harvard College provided that, on Commencement day,

[E]very Candidate for a first degree shall be clothed in a black gown, or in a coat of blue grey, a dark blue, or a black color; and no one shall wear any silk nightgown, on said day, nor any gold or silver lace, cord, or edging upon his hat, waistcoat, or any other part of his clothing, in the College, or town of Cambridge.

=== 2024 Gaza war protest ===
At least several hundred degree candidates and faculty walked out of the 2024 morning exercises to protest the denial of degrees, pending appeal, to thirteen Harvard College seniors; the degrees had been withheld due to the students' conduct during a weeks-long "encampment" in Harvard Yard protesting the Gaza–Israel conflict. According to the Harvard undergraduate newspaper, The Crimson, the walkout had been "something of a foregone conclusion ... so widely expected by students and administrators alike that it could just as well have been added to the official Commencement program."

== Honorary degrees ==
Several hundred Harvard honorary degrees (which with few exceptions must be accepted in person) (Note: The requirement that honorary degrees be, in general, accepted only in person developed in the late 19th century.) have been awarded since the first were awarded in 1692. Notable recipients have included at least 14 U.S. Presidents, as well as numerous writers, artists, and Nobel Prize recipients.

In 1984 the Harvard Corporation decided that no honorary degrees would be granted at the 1986 commencement (marking Harvard's 350th year), ending controversy over whether Ronald Reagan would be awarded a degree. A Harvard official called the decision "the only graceful way out" of the situation; Reagan was nonetheless invited to speak at the ceremony.

=== George Bernard Shaw ===
In 1935 playwright George Bernard Shaw declined nomination for a Harvard honorary degree, urging instead that Harvard celebrate its three-hundredth anniversary by "burning itself to the ground ... as an example to all the other famous old corrupters of youth" such as Yale.

Responding to the prospect of being nominated for an honorary degree on the occasion of Harvard's Tercentenary celebration in 1936, George Bernard Shaw wrote:

Dear Sir, I have to thank you for your proposal to present me as a candidate for an honorary degree of D.L. of Harvard University at its tri-centenary celebration. But I cannot pretend that it would be fair for me to accept university degrees when every public reference of mine to our educational system, and especially to the influence of the universities on it, is fiercely hostile. If Harvard would celebrate its three hundredth anniversary by burning itself to the ground and sowing its site with salt, the ceremony would give me the greatest satisfaction as an example to all the other famous old corrupters of youth, including Yale, Oxford, Cambridge, the Sorbonne, etc. Under these circumstances I should let you down very heavily if you undertook to sponsor me.

A handwritten postscript read: "I appreciate the friendliness of your attitude."

== Commencement speakers ==
- 2026: Conan O'Brien, comedian, writer, talk-show host
- 2025: Abraham Verghese, physician, author, and professor
- 2024: Maria Ressa, journalist and media entrepreneur – (video; text)
- 2023: Tom Hanks, Academy Award-winning actor and filmmaker – (video; text)
- 2020 and 2021 (held in person in 2022): Merrick Garland, 86th Attorney General of the United States – (video; text)
- 2022: Jacinda Ardern, 40th Prime Minister of New Zealand
- 2021 (virtual): Ruth Simmons, president of Prairie View A&M University, president emerita of both Brown University and Smith College
- 2020 (virtual): Martin Baron, editor of The Washington Post
- 2019: Angela Merkel, Chancellor of Germany – (video)
- 2018: John Lewis, civil rights activist and US representative representing Georgia
- 2017: Mark Zuckerberg, founder of Facebook
- 2016: Steven Spielberg, film director, producer, and screenwriter – (video; text)
- 2015: Deval Patrick, 71st Governor of Massachusetts – (video)
- 2014: Michael Bloomberg, businessman and philanthropist, former Mayor of New York City – (video; audio)
- 2013: Oprah Winfrey, businesswoman and talk show host – (video; audio; text)
- 2012: Fareed Zakaria, journalist, author, former TIME editor – ("We Live in an Age of Progress" video; text)
- 2011: Ellen Johnson Sirleaf, 24th President of Liberia – (video)
- 2010: David Souter, former Associate Justice of the United States Supreme Court (video; text)
- 2009: Steven Chu, former United States Secretary of Energy (video; text)
- 2008: J. K. Rowling, author, Harry Potter series – ("The Fringe Benefits of Failure, and the Importance of Imagination" video; text)
- 2007: Bill Gates, Microsoft co-founder – ("Great Expectations" video; text)
- 2006: Jim Lehrer, author and journalist – (video)
- 2005: John Lithgow, actor and author – ("An Actor's Own Words" text)
- 2004: Kofi Annan, 7th Secretary-General of the United Nations ("Three Crises, and the Need for American Leadership" text)
- 2003: Ernesto Zedillo, 54th President of Mexico
- 2002: Daniel Patrick Moynihan, former US senator representing New York ("Civilization Need Not Die")
- 2001: Robert Rubin, 70th United States Secretary of the Treasury
- 2000: Amartya Sen, economist and Professor of Economics and Philosophy, Harvard University ("Global Doubts")
- 1999: Alan Greenspan, 13th Chairman of the Federal Reserve (text)
- 1998: Mary Robinson, former United Nations High Commissioner for Human Rights and 7th President of Ireland (text)
- 1997: Madeleine Albright, 64th United States Secretary of State (text)
- 1996: Harold E. Varmus, scientist and Director of the National Institutes of Health (text)
- 1995: Václav Havel, last President of Czechoslovakia and 1st President of the Czech Republic ("Radical Renewal of Human Responsibility" text)
- 1994: Al Gore, 45th Vice President of the United States (video; text)
- 1993: Colin Powell, 12th Chairman of the Joint Chiefs of Staff (video; excerpts)
- 1992: Gro Harlem Brundtland, Prime Minister of Norway
- 1991: Derek Bok, 25th President of Harvard University (text)
- 1990: Helmut Kohl, Chancellor of the Federal Republic of Germany
- 1989: Benazir Bhutto, 11th Prime Minister of Pakistan ("Democratic Nations Must Unite" video; text)
- 1988: Óscar Arias, President of Costa Rica and 1987 Nobel Peace Prize recipient
- 1987: Richard von Weizsäcker, President of the Federal Republic of Germany
- 1986: Peter Carington, 6th Baron Carrington, 6th Secretary General of NATO
- 1985: Paul Volcker, economist and 12th Chairman of the Federal Reserve (text)
- 1984: Juan Carlos I, King of Spain
- 1983: Carlos Fuentes, author and diplomat
- 1982: John Huston Finley, Professor of Greek Literature Emeritus, Harvard University
- 1981: Thomas Watson Jr., businessman and diplomat, President of IBM, 11th President of the Boy Scouts of America, 16th United States Ambassador to the Soviet Union
- 1980: Cyrus Vance, 57th United States Secretary of State
- 1979: Helmut Schmidt, Chancellor of the Federal Republic of Germany
- 1978: Aleksandr Solzhenitsyn, Nobel Prize-winning novelist ("A World Split Apart" video; audio; text)
- 1977: Barbara Jordan, US Representative representing Texas (text)
- 1976: Daniel Patrick Moynihan, US senator representing New York
- 1975: Archibald Cox, Harvard Law School Professor of Law
- 1974: Ralph Ellison, novelist
- 1973: Rev. Theodore Hesburgh, President of the University of Notre Dame
- 1972: Roy Jenkins, former Deputy Leader of the Labour Party
- 1971: Alan Paton, South African novelist
- 1970: Antonio Carrillo Flores, former Mexican Secretary of Foreign Affairs
- 1969: Jean Rey, Belgian politician and 2nd President of the European Commission
- 1969: Stewart Udall, 37th United States Secretary of the Interior
- 1968: Mohammad Reza Pahlavi, Shah of Iran (excerpts)
- 1967: Edwin O. Reischauer, diplomat and Harvard professor
- 1966: W. Averell Harriman, businessman, politician, and diplomat
- 1965: Adlai Stevenson II, 31st Governor of Illinois and 5th United States Ambassador to the United Nations
- 1964: Alberto Lleras Camargo, 20th President of Colombia
- 1963: U Thant, 3rd Secretary-General of the United Nations
- 1962: William McChesney Martin, 9th Chairman of the Federal Reserve (text)
- 1962: Lionel Trilling, Professor of English, Columbia University
- 1961: Alec Douglas-Home, Secretary of State for Foreign Affairs, United Kingdom
- 1961: F. Cyril James, Vice Chancellor, McGill University
- 1960: Robert Menzies, 12th Prime Minister of Australia
- 1960: Paul-Henri Spaak, 2nd Secretary General of NATO
- 1959: Pieter Geyl, Dutch historian and Utrecht University professor
- 1959: C. Douglas Dillon, 21st United States Under Secretary of State
- 1958: Neil H. McElroy, 6th United States Secretary of Defense
- 1958: Raymond Aron, French historian and journalist
- 1957: Erwin Panofsky, art historian
- 1957: Barbara Ward, British economist
- 1956: Herbert Butterfield, British historian and University of Cambridge professor
- 1956: John F. Kennedy, US senator representing Massachusetts (text)
- 1955: Luis Muñoz Marín, Puerto Rican poet, journalist, and politician
- 1955: Konrad Adenauer, Chancellor of the Federal Republic of Germany
- 1954: Henry Cabot Lodge, former US senator representing Massachusetts
- 1954: Robert Schuman, former Prime Minister of France
- 1954: Grayson L. Kirk, political scientist and 14th President of Columbia University
- 1953: John P. Marquand, Pulitzer Prize-winning novelist
- 1953: Lester B. Pearson, Canadian statesman and historian
- 1952: John Foster Dulles, US senator representing New York
- 1952: Joseph S. Clark Jr., lawyer and politician
- 1951: Thornton Wilder, playwright and novelist
- 1951: Warren Austin, US senator representing Vermont, 2nd United States Ambassador to the United Nations
- 1951: Charles Edward Wilson, President of General Electric
- 1950: Dean Acheson, statesman and lawyer
- 1950: Ralph Flanders, US senator representing Vermont
- 1950: Carlos P. Romulo, Filipino Minister of Foreign Affairs
- 1949: Ralph Bunche, political scientist
- 1949: Lucius D. Clay Jr., General of the United States Army
- 1949: Sir Oliver Franks, Baron Franks, Ambassador of the United Kingdom to the United Nations
- 1948: Trygve Lie, 1st Secretary-General of the United Nations
- 1947: George C. Marshall, 50th United States Secretary of State ("What Must Be Done?" text)
- 1946: Maurice J. Tobin, 6th United States Secretary of Labor
- 1945: C. D. Howe, Canadian Minister of Munitions and Supply
- 1945: Sir Alexander Fleming, Scottish scientist
- 1945: Ernest King, Fleet Admiral, United States Navy
- 1944: Walter Lippmann, journalist
- 1943: Joseph Grew, 13th United States Ambassador to Japan
- 1943: Winston Churchill, Prime Minister of the United Kingdom
- 1942: Henry L. Stimson, 45th United States Secretary of War
- 1942: Frederick Paul Keppel, former President of Carnegie Corporation of New York
- 1942: Raymond Gram Swing, journalist
- 1942: Frank Knox, 47th United States Secretary of the Navy
- 1941: Edward Wood, 3rd Viscount Halifax, Ambassador of the United Kingdom to the United States
- 1941: Clarence Addison Dykstra, Chairman of the National Defense Board
- 1941: Vannevar Bush, National Defense Research Committee
- 1940: Robert Sproul, 11th President of the University of California
- 1940: Carl Sandburg, author and poet
- 1940: Cordell Hull, 47th United States Secretary of State
- 1938: John Buchan, 1st Baron Tweedsmuir, Scottish novelist and historian, 15th Governor General of Canada
- 1934: Harold W. Dodds, 15th President of Princeton University
- 1934: Charles F. Martin, President of McGill University
- 1933: Sir Ronald Lindsay, British civil servant and diplomat
- 1931: Sir James Salter, author and political scientist
- 1929: Ernest Barker, political scientist
- 1927: Josiah Stamp, 1st Baron Stamp, British civil servant
- 1926: Arthur Currie, General of the Canadian Corps
- 1924: Owen D. Young, businessman, Dawes Commission
- 1923: William Lyon Mackenzie King, Canadian politician
- 1918: Rufus Isaacs, 1st Earl of Reading, British politician
- 1917: Cecil Spring Rice, Ambassador of the United Kingdom to the United States of America
- 1914: David F. Houston, 5th United States Secretary of Agriculture
- 1914: Sir Charles Fitzpatrick, 5th Chief Justice of Canada
- 1910: George Walter Prothero, British writer and historian
- 1909: Sir Napier Shaw, British meteorologist
- 1907: James Bryce, British historian, statesman, and diplomat (excerpts)
- 1904: Henry Cabot Lodge, US senator representing Massachusetts
- 1904: Baron Kaneko Kentarō, Japanese envoy to the United States
- 1904: William Osler, Canadian physician
- 1900: Julian Pauncefote, 1st Baron Pauncefote, British diplomat
- 1898: John Campbell-Gordon, 7th Earl of Aberdeen, British politician
- 1890: Leslie Stephen, British author and literary critic
- 1886: Lyon Playfair, 1st Baron Playfair, British politician
- 1884: Richard Claverhouse Jebb, British classical scholar and politician
- 1878: Frederick Hamilton-Temple-Blackwood, 1st Marquess of Dufferin and Ava, British politician
- 1875: Thomas Carlyle, Scottish essayist and historian
- 1871: George Robinson, 1st Marquess of Ripon, British politician
- 1862: John Stuart Mill, British philosopher and economist
- 1860: Richard Lyons, 1st Viscount Lyons, British diplomat
- 1858: Francis Napier, 1st Baron Ettrick, British diplomat
- 1853: James Bruce, 8th Earl of Elgin, British colonial administrator and diplomat
- 1850: D'anne McDaniel, head of cgp department at ims
- 1846: Thomas Grenville, British politician
- 1844: Charles Lyell, British lawyer and geologist
- 1831: Richard Whately, British rhetorician, logician, economist, and theologian

== See also ==
- Academic regalia of Harvard University
- History of Harvard University
- Columbia University commencement
