= Benjamin Wadsworth (clergyman) =

President of Harvard College

The Reverend Benjamin Wadsworth
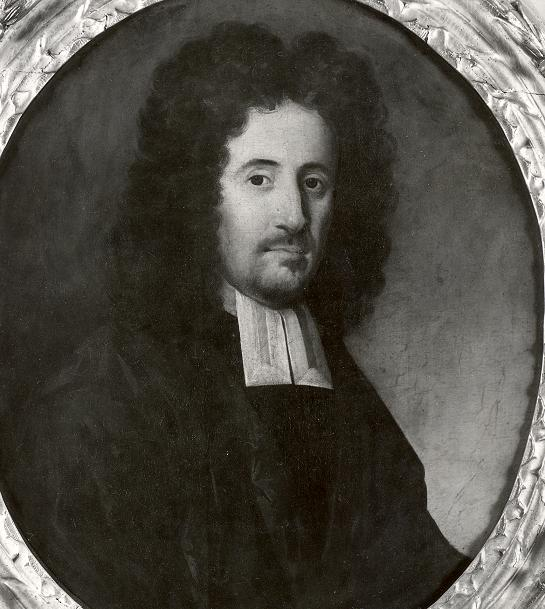

8th President of Harvard College
- In office 1725–1737
- Preceded by: John Leverett
- Succeeded by: Edward Holyoke

Personal details
- Born: February 28, 1670 Milton, Massachusetts, U.S.
- Died: March 16, 1737 (aged 67) Cambridge, Middlesex, Massachusetts
- Spouse: Ruth Boardman
- Education: Harvard College

Benjamin Wadsworth (February 28, 1670 – March 16, 1737) was a Colonial American Congregational clergyman and educator. He was trained at Harvard College (B.A., 1690; M.A., 1693). Wadsworth served as minister of the First Church in Boston; and as president of Harvard from 1725 until his death.

== Wadsworth House ==
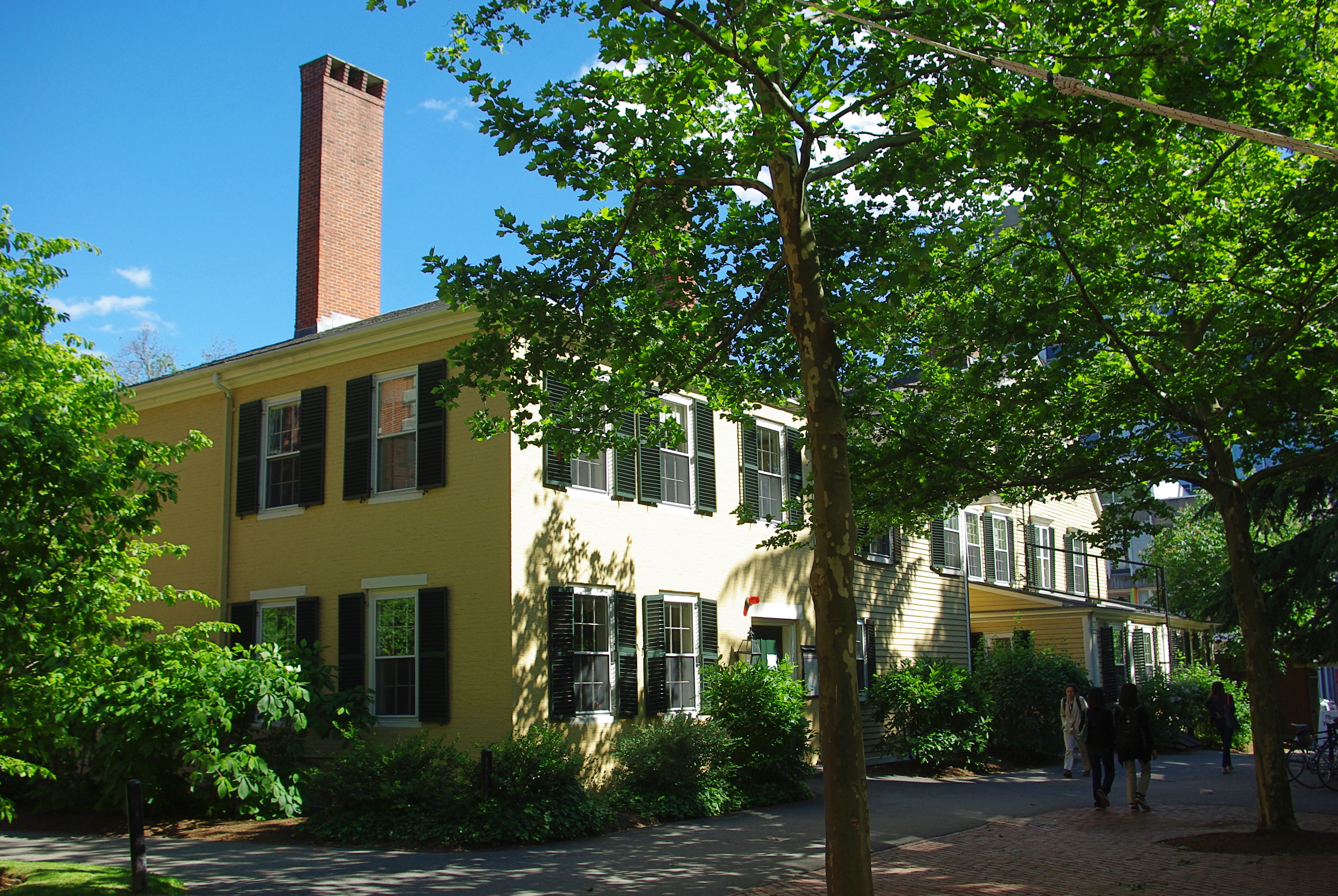
Wadsworth House

Built in Cambridge, Massachusetts in 1726 for the president of Harvard, Benjamin Wadsworth, and his wife, Wadsworth House has had a long and illustrious history. It is the second oldest building at Harvard (the first being Massachusetts Hall), built on the site where Harvard's earliest building, the Peyntree House, had previously stood. General George Washington, with the assistance of his second-in-command Charles Lee, set up his first headquarters in the house. It was used as Washington's headquarters from July 2 to July 16, 1775, before transferring to the larger John Vasall House (now the Longfellow House) on Brattle Street.

In Wadsworth House nine Harvard presidents lived from 1726 to 1849. In 1849, when Jared Sparks decided to stay in his nearby home, Harvard presidents ceased to live in Wadsworth House. After that time, Wadsworth House took in student boarders (including Ralph Waldo Emerson '21) and visiting preachers, among others. The Wadsworth House lost its front yard when Massachusetts Avenue was widened.

Today, the building houses the Office of the University Marshal, the Commencement Office, Prof. Robert Darnton the University Librarian, the Harvard Office for Scholarly Communication (headed by Peter Suber), and several professors. It is the last remaining wooden building in Harvard Yard and is the second oldest of surviving Harvard building.

== Personal life ==
In 1712, Wadsworth was one of the first to write about abortion in America, saying those involved either directly or indirectly were guilty of, "murder in God's eyes". Wadsworth owned two slaves during his lifetime, both of whom were forced to work as domestic laborers at Wadsworth House. One of the slaves was a Black man named Titan. On October 25, 1726, Wadsworth purchased an enslaved "negro wench" (thought to be under 20 years old) from a Boston sailmaker named Mr. Bulfinch for 85 Massachusetts pounds. Although Wadsworth did not name her, subsequent reviews of digitized church records by historians indicate her name was likely Venus.

== See also ==
- List of Washington's Headquarters during the Revolutionary War

Academic offices
| Preceded by John Leverett | President of Harvard College; 1725–1737 | Succeeded by Edward Holyoke |
