= History of Harvard University =

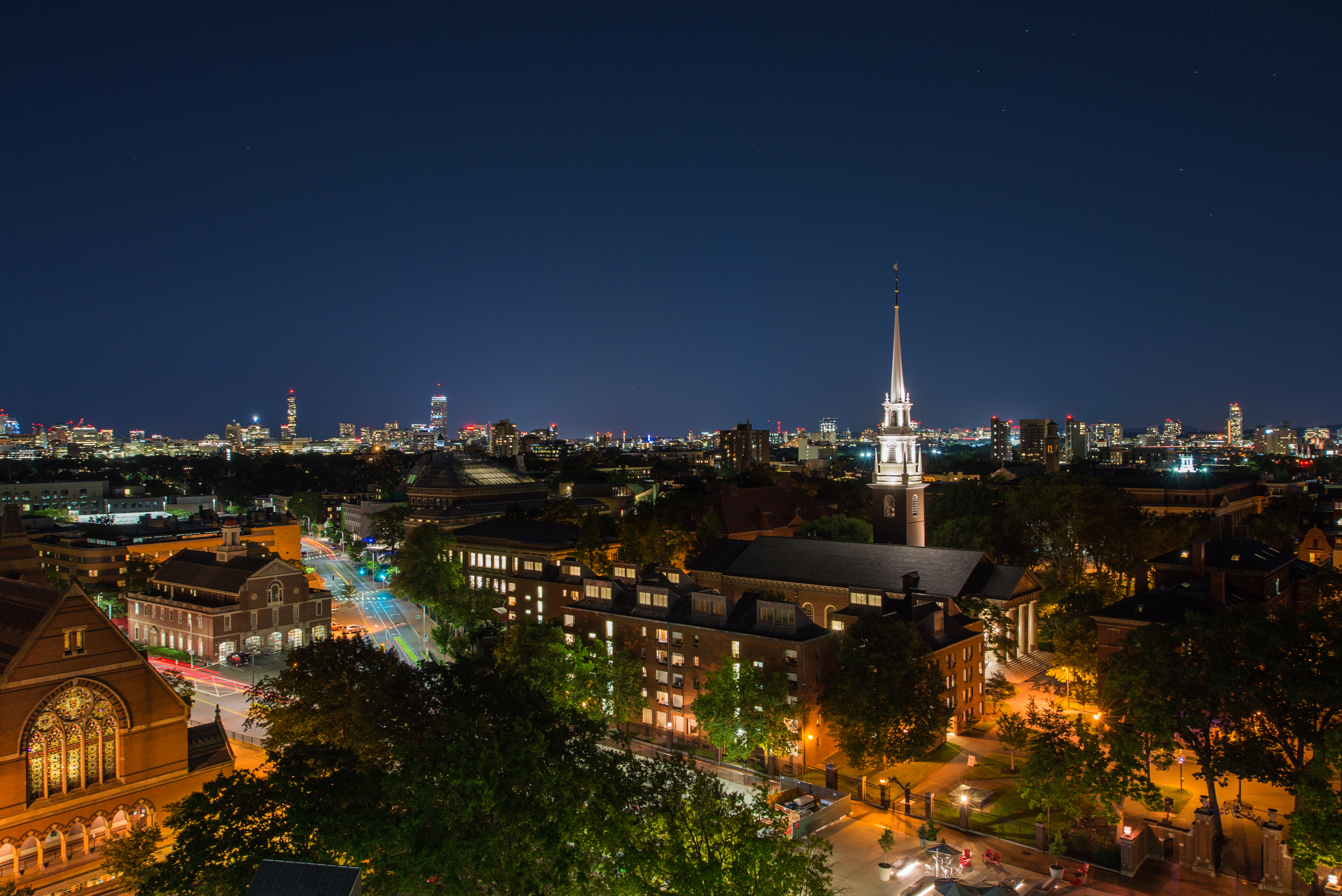
An aerial view of the Harvard University campus at night in July 2017

Harvard College was founded in 1636 in New Towne, a settlement itself founded six years earlier in colonial-era Massachusetts Bay Colony, one of the original Thirteen Colonies. In 1638, New Towne was renamed Cambridge, in honor of Cambridge, England, where many of the Colony's settlers had attended the University of Cambridge. In 1639 the school was given the name of Harvard College after its first major benefactor, clergyman John Harvard. Harvard is the oldest institution of higher learning in the United States.

In the late 18th century, Harvard began granting graduate and doctorate-level degrees, and in 1780 the Constitution of Massachusetts recognized it as a university. In 1783, a new medical school was established as the Medical Institution of Harvard University. Thereafter, Harvard College referred exclusively to the undergraduate programs. The stature of the university grew nationally and ultimately globally, as a dozen graduate and professional schools were formed to add to the nucleus of the undergraduate College. The university's other historically influential schools include those of law (1817), business (1908), and Graduate Arts and Sciences (1890). For centuries, Harvard graduates dominated Massachusetts' clerical and civil ranks. Since the late 19th century, Harvard has been one of the most prestigious schools in the world, with the largest library system and financial endowment.

== 17th century ==
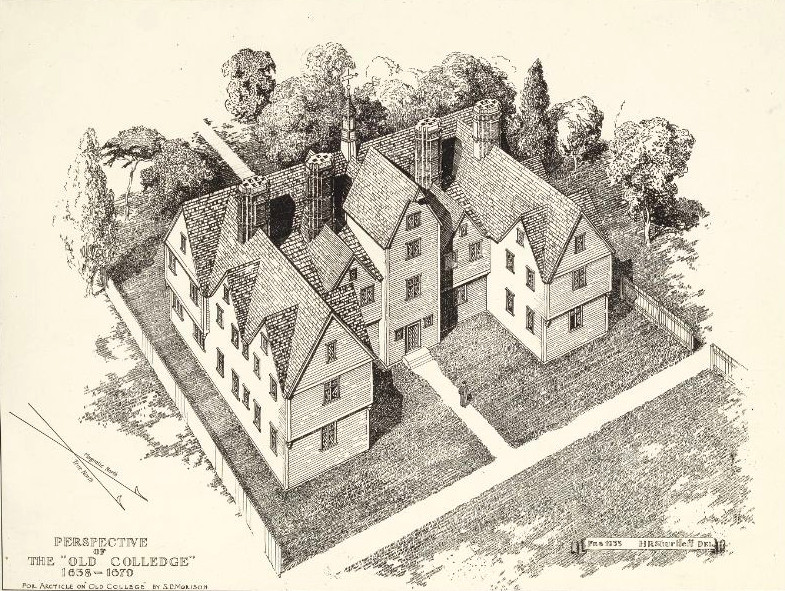
The original Harvard College building (1638–1670) as imagined by historian Samuel Eliot Morison

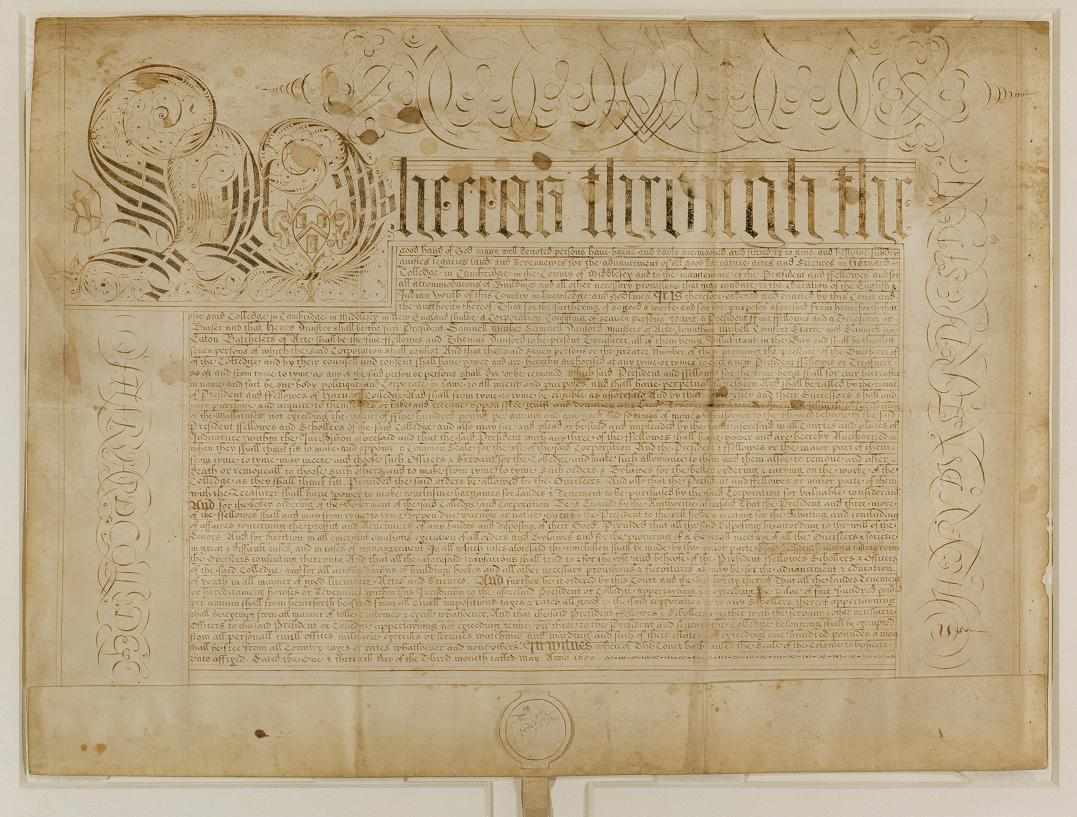
The Harvard Corporation's charter was granted in 1650 by Governor Thomas Dudley.

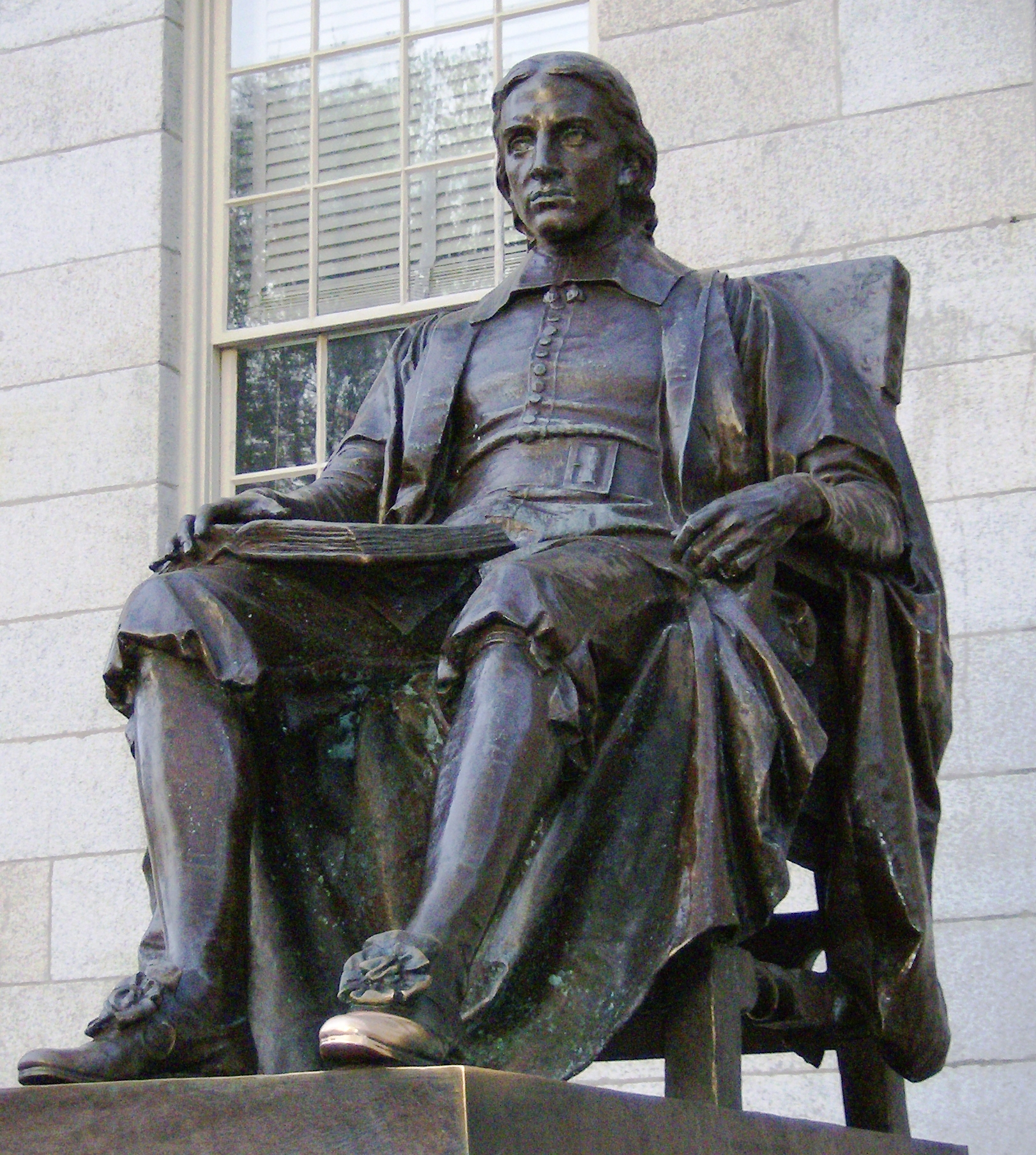
The John Harvard statue in Harvard Yard. On his death in 1638, John Harvard left 779 pounds sterling, and his library of some 400 books, to the Colony's new school.

In 1636, after some 17,000 Puritans had migrated to New England, Harvard was founded in anticipation of the need for training clergy for the new commonwealth, a "church in the wilderness". Harvard was established that year by vote of the Great and General Court, the governing legislative body of colonial-era Massachusetts Bay Colony, one of the original Thirteen Colonies.

Nathaniel Eaton oversaw the college under various titles between 1637 and 1639. In 1638, it received a printing press – the first in North America – and it received a second press in 1659.

On March 13, 1639, the college was named Harvard College in honor of the Puritan clergyman John Harvard, a University of Cambridge alumnus who willed the new school £779 pounds sterling and his library of some 400 books.

The first commencement of Harvard College was in 1642, with only nine students. Benjamin Woodbridge was the first person to receive a Harvard College degree.

In the 1640s, Harvard College established the Harvard Indian College, which educated Native American students. It was only attended by a handful of students, only one of whom graduated.

In 1643, a Harvard publication defined the college's purpose: "[to] advance learning and perpetuate it to posterity, dreading to leave an illiterate ministry to the churches when our present ministers shall lie in the dust."

In its early years, the college trained many Puritan Congregational ministers and offered a classical curriculum based on the English university model exemplified by the University of Cambridge, where many colonial Massachusetts leaders had studied prior to emigrating to the colony. Harvard College never formally affiliated with any particular Protestant denomination, but its curriculum conformed to the tenets of Puritanism.

The colony charter creating the Harvard Corporation was granted in 1650 at the beginning of the English Interregnum. When Henry Dunster, the college's second president from 1640 to 1654, abandoned Puritanism in favor of the English Baptist faith in 1654, he provoked a controversy that highlighted two distinct approaches to dealing with dissent in the Massachusetts Bay Colony. The colony's Puritan leaders, whose own religion was born of dissent from the mainstream Church of England, generally worked for reconciliation with members who questioned matters of Puritan theology, but responded much more harshly to outright rejection of Puritanism.

Dunster's conflict with the colony's magistrates began when he failed to have his infant son baptized, believing as an adherent of the Believers baptism of English Baptists and/or Anabaptists that only adults should be baptized. Efforts to restore Dunster to Puritan orthodoxy failed, and his apostasy proved untenable to colony leaders who had entrusted him in his job as Harvard's president to uphold the colony's religious mission, thus he represented a threat to the stability of society. Dunster exiled himself in 1654 and moved to nearby Plymouth Colony, where he died in 1658. Because it had been unlawful for the colony to establish a college, King Charles II rescinded the Massachusetts Bay Colony charter in 1684 by a writ of scire facias.

In 1692, the leading Puritan divine Increase Mather became Harvard's sixth president. He replaced pagan classics with books by Christian authors in ethics classes and maintained discipline in the college. The Harvard "Lawes" of 1642 and the "Harvard College Laws of 1700" testify to its original high level of discipline. Students were required to observe rules of pious decorum inconceivable in the 19th century, and ultimately to prove their fitness for the bachelor's degree by showing that they could "read the original of the Old and New Testament into the Latin tongue, and resolve them logically". Harvard's leadership and alumni, including Increase Mather and his son Cotton Mather, played central roles in the Salem Witch Trials in 1692–1693.

The town of Dedham was founded in 1636, the same year as the college. The first minister of the First Church and Parish in Dedham, John Allin, served as an overseer, and every minister through 1861 was connected to the university. Given its population and modest means, the support the community provided to the college was generous. Allin donated two cows, presumably to provide milk for the president and tutors.

During Harvard's early years, the town of Cambridge maintained order at the college and provided economic support, as the local Puritan minister had direct oversight of Harvard and ensured the orthodoxy of its leadership. By 1700, Harvard was strong enough to regulate and discipline its own people, and to a large extent the direction in which support and assistance flowed was reversed, Harvard now providing financial support for local economic expansion, improvements to public health, and the construction of local roads, meeting houses, and schools.

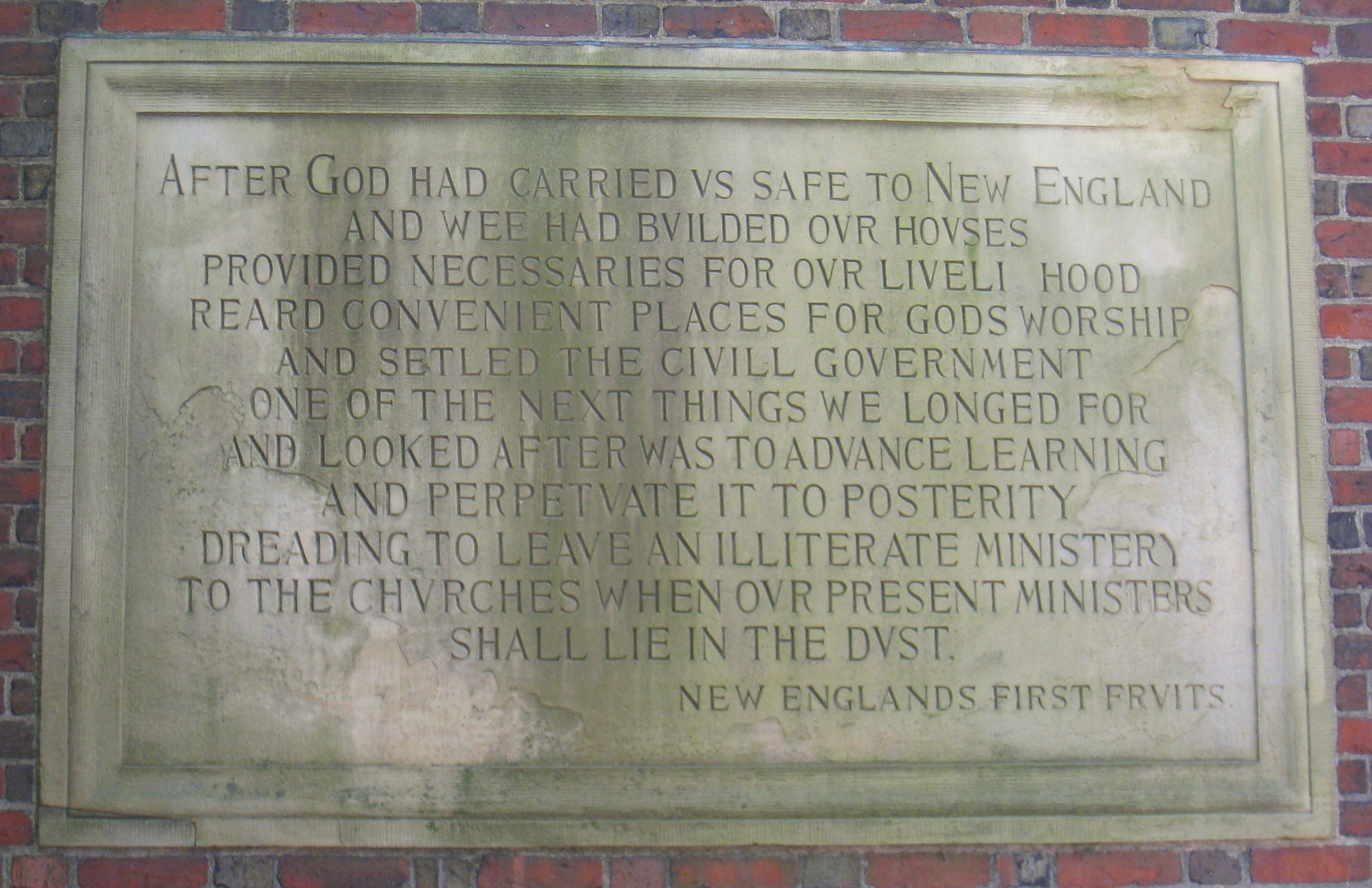
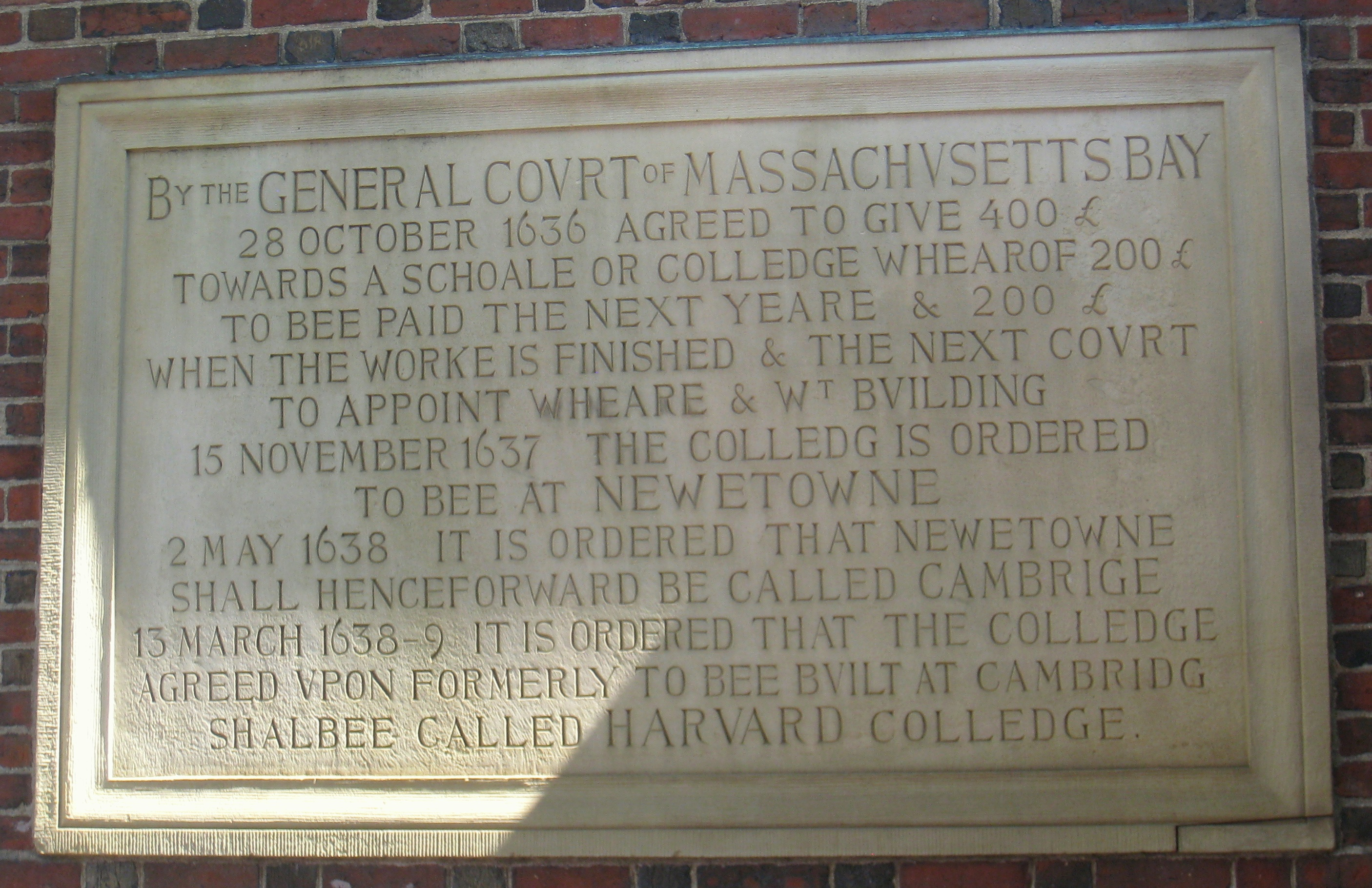
Tablets outside Harvard Yard's Johnston Gate. The tablet on the left (above) quotes from a longer history which continues, "And as we were thinking and consulting how to effect this great work, it pleased God to stir up the heart of one Mr. Harvard (a godly gentleman and a lover of learning, there living among us) to give the one-half of his estate (it being in all about 1700 £) toward the erecting of a college, and all his library. After him, another gave 300 £; others after them cast in more; and the public hand of the state added the rest."

== 18th century ==
The early motto of Harvard was Veritas Christo et Ecclesiae, meaning "Truth for Christ and the Church". In the early classes, half the graduates became ministers, which diminished to 15% by the 1760s, and ten of Harvard's first twelve presidents were ministers. Systematic theological instruction was inaugurated in 1721. By 1827, Harvard became a nucleus of theological teaching in New England.

The end of Mather's presidency in 1701 marked the start of a long struggle at Harvard between orthodoxy and liberalism. In 1708, John Leverett, Harvard's first secular president, was appointed as Harvard's seventh president. Leverett left the curriculum largely intact, but sought to keep the college independent of the overwhelming influence of any single Christian denomination.

Harvard alumni were enormously supportive of the American Revolution with Patriot alumni exceeding Loyalists seven to one. During the Revolutionary War, seven alumni were killed in their service of the Continental Army.

In the second half of the 18th century, Harvard began granting graduate and doctorate-level degrees. In 1780, the Constitution of Massachusetts recognized Harvard College as a university, and when in 1783 a new medical school was established, it was given the formal name of the Medical Institution of Harvard University.

== 19th century ==
College/school	Year founded
Harvard College	1636
Medicine	1782
Divinity	1816
Law	1817
Dental Medicine	1867
Arts and Sciences	1872
Business	1908
Extension	1910
Design	1914
Education	1920
Public Health	1922
Government	1936
Engineering & Applied Sciences	2007

=== Unitarians ===
Throughout the 18th century, Enlightenment ideas of the power of reason and free will became widespread among Congregational ministers, putting those ministers and their congregations in tension with more traditionalist, Calvinist parties.

Following the death of Hollis Professor of Divinity David Tappan in 1803 and that of Harvard president Joseph Willard a year later, a struggle broke out over their replacements. Henry Ware was elected to the chair in 1805, and the liberal Samuel Webber was appointed Harvard president two years later, signaling a changing of the tide from the dominance of traditional ideas at Harvard to the dominance of liberal, Arminian ideas, defined by traditionalists as Unitarian ideas.

=== Science ===
In 1846, the natural history lectures of Louis Agassiz were acclaimed both in New York and on his campus at Harvard College. Agassiz's approach was distinctly idealist and posited Americans' "participation in the Divine Nature" and the possibility of understanding "intellectual existences". Agassiz's perspective on science combined observation with intuition and the assumption that one can grasp the "divine plan" in all phenomena. When it came to explaining life-forms, Agassiz resorted to matters of shape based on a presumed archetype for his evidence. This dual view of knowledge was in concert with the teachings of Common Sense Realism derived from Scottish philosophers Thomas Reid and Dugald Stewart, whose works were part of the Harvard curriculum at the time. The popularity of Agassiz's efforts to "soar with Plato" probably also derived from other writings to which Harvard students were exposed, including Platonic treatises by Ralph Cudworth, John Norris and in a Romantic vein Samuel Coleridge. The library records at Harvard reveal that the writings of Plato and his early modern and Romantic followers were almost as regularly read during the 19th century as those of the "official philosophy" of the more empirical and more deistic Scottish school.

=== Elitism ===
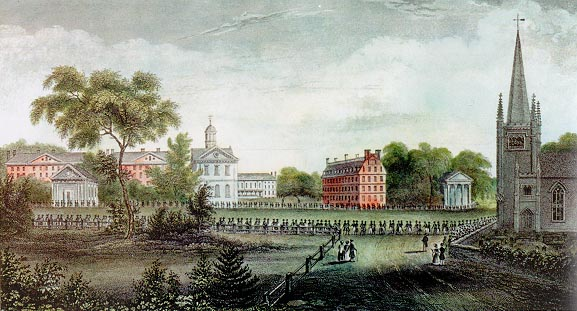
Procession of Harvard alumni (1836), drawn by Eliza Susan Quincy (daughter of Harvard President Josiah Quincy). Left to right: Stoughton Hall, Holden Chapel, Hollis Hall, Harvard Hall, University Hall, Massachusetts Hall, unidentified building, First Parish Meeting House.

Between 1830 and 1870, Harvard became "privatized". While the Federalists controlled state government, Harvard had prospered and the 1824 defeat of the Federalist Party in Massachusetts allowed the renascent Democratic-Republicans to block state funding of private universities. By 1870, the politicians and ministers that heretofore had made up the university's board of overseers had been replaced by Harvard alumni drawn from Boston's upper-class business and professional community and funded by private endowment.

During this period, Harvard experienced unparalleled growth that securely placed it financially in a league of its own among American colleges. Ronald Story notes that in 1850, Harvard's total assets were "five times that of Amherst and Williams combined, and three times that of Yale". Story also notes that "all the evidence... points to the four decades from 1815 to 1855 as the era when parents, in Henry Adams's words, began 'sending their children to Harvard College for the sake of its social advantages'". Under President Eliot's tenure, Harvard earned a reputation for being more liberal and democratic than either Princeton or Yale in regard to bigotry against Jews and other ethnic minorities. In 1870, one year into Eliot's term, Richard Theodore Greener became the first African-American to graduate from Harvard College. Seven years later, Louis Brandeis, the first Jewish justice on the Supreme Court, graduated from Harvard Law School. Nevertheless, Harvard became the bastion of a distinctly Protestant élite – the so-called Boston Brahmin class – and continued to be so well into the 20th century.

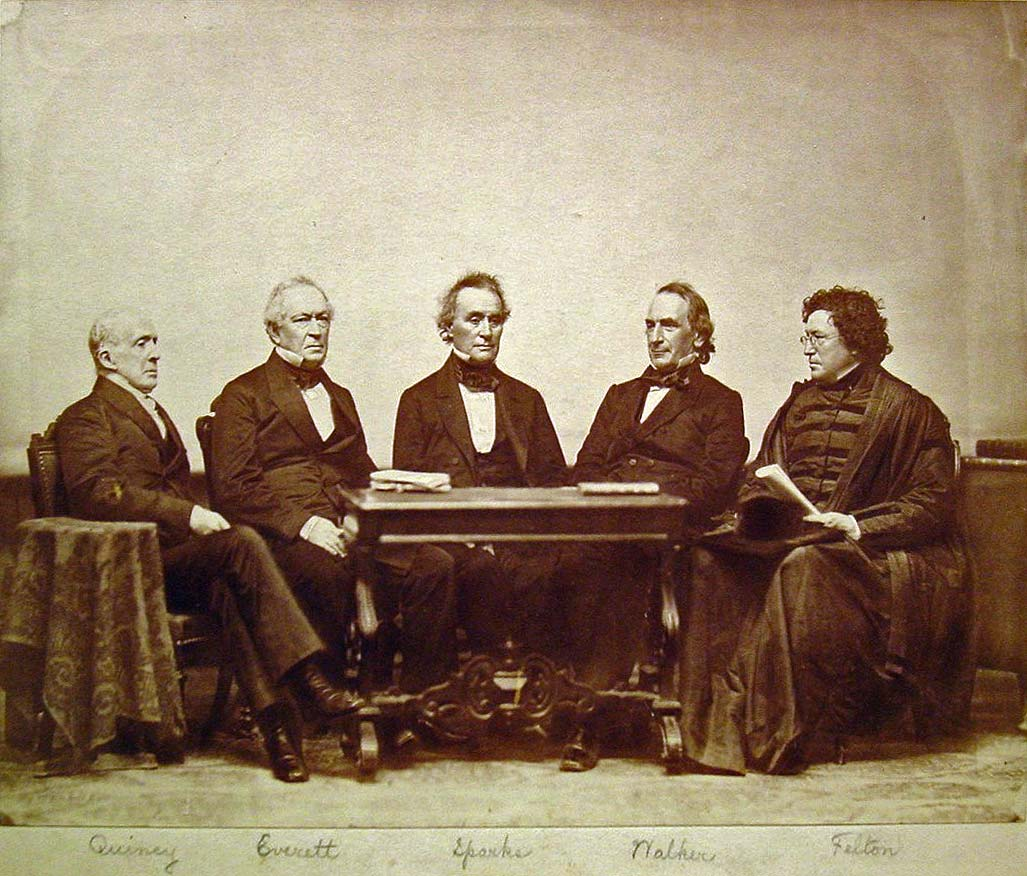
Five Harvard University Presidents sitting in order of their service, including (left to right): Josiah Quincy III, Edward Everett, Jared Sparks, James Walker, and Cornelius Conway Felton

The annual undergraduate tuition was $300 in the 1930s and $400 in the 1940s. By 1953, it doubled to $800. It increased further to $2,600 in 1970 and $22,700 in 2000.

=== Eliot ===
Charles W. Eliot, the university's president from 1869 to 1909, eliminated the favored position of Christianity from the curriculum while opening it to student self-direction. While Eliot was the most crucial figure in the secularization of American higher education, he was motivated not by a desire to secularize education, but by transcendentalist Unitarian convictions. Derived from William Ellery Channing and Ralph Waldo Emerson, these convictions were focused on the dignity and worth of human nature, the right and ability of each person to perceive truth and the indwelling God in each person.

=== Sports ===
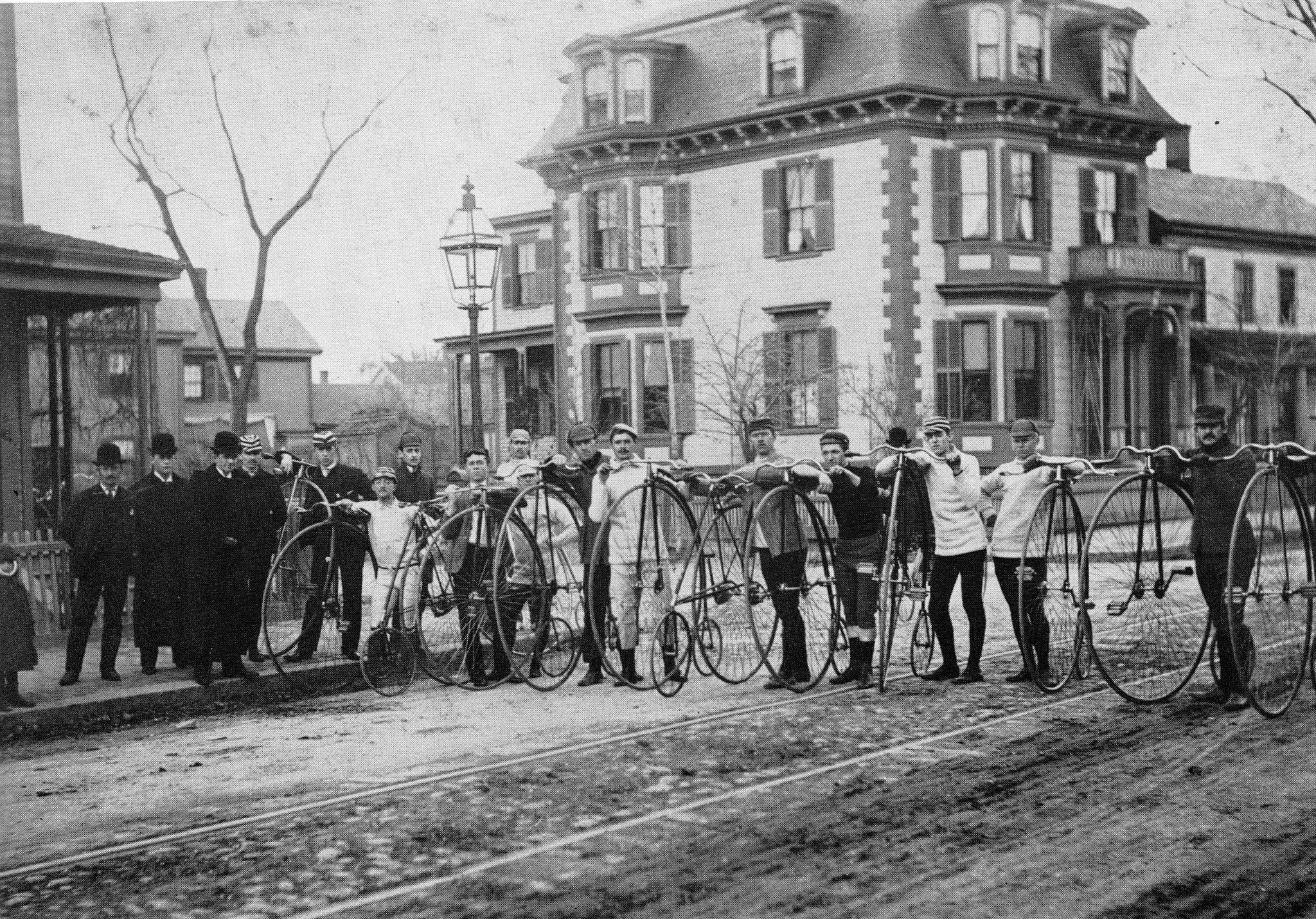
15-mile Penny Farthing Race, Harvard University Cycling Association in 1887

The Harvard Crimson football program was originally organized by students as an extracurricular activity, and was banned twice by the university, who then saw the sport as brutal and dangerous. By the 1880s, however, football became a dominant force at the college as alumni became more involved in the sport.

In 1882, the faculty formed a three-member athletic committee to oversee all intercollegiate athletics, but due to increasing student and alumni pressure the committee was expanded in 1885 to include three student and three alumni members. The alumni's role in the rise and commercialization of football, the leading moneymaker for athletics by the 1880s, was evident in the fundraising for the first steel-reinforced concrete stadium. The class of 1879 donated $100,000 – nearly one-third of the cost – to the construction of the 35,000-seat stadium, which was completed in 1903, with the remainder to be collected from future ticket sales.

=== Modern language studies ===
Programs in the study of French and Spanish languages began in 1816 with George Ticknor as its first professor.

== 20th century ==
During the 20th century, Harvard's international reputation for scholarship grew as a burgeoning endowment and prominent professors expanded the university's scope. Explosive growth in the student population continued with the addition of new graduate schools and the expansion of the undergraduate program. It built the largest and finest academic library in the world and built up the labs and clinics needed to establish the reputation of its science departments and the Medical School. The Law School vied with Yale Law for preeminence, while the Business School combined a large-scale research program with a special appeal to entrepreneurs rather than accountants. The different schools are financially independent and maintain their separate endowments, which are very large in the case of the college/Faculty of Arts and Sciences, and the Business, Law and Medical Schools, but quite modest for the Divinity and Education schools. (Note: Smith, University Finances: Accounting and Budgeting Principles for Higher Education Johns Hopkins Press, 2019. Page 197.)

Radcliffe College, established in 1879 as a sister school of Harvard College, became one of the most prominent schools for women in the United States. In the 1920s, Edward Harkness (1874–1940), a Yale man with oil wealth, was ignored by his alma mater, leading him to give $12,000,000 to Harvard to establish a house system like that of the University of Oxford in England. Yale later took his money and set up a similar system.

In addition to the usual departments, specialized research centers proliferated, especially to enable interdisciplinary research projects that could not be handled at the department level. However, the departments kept jealous control of the awarding of tenure; typically tenured professorships went to outsiders, and not as promotions to assistant professors. Older research centers include the East Asian Research Center, the Center for International Affairs, the Center for Eastern Studies, the Russian Research Center, the Charles Warren Center for Studies in American History and the Joint Center for Urban Studies (with MIT). The Centers raised their own money, sometimes from endowments, but most often from federal and foundation grants, making them increasingly independent entities.

During World War II, Harvard was one of 131 colleges and universities nationally that took part in the V-12 Navy College Training Program which offered students a path to a Navy commission.

The annual undergraduate tuition was $300 in the 1920s and $400 in the 1930s, doubling to $800 in 1953. It reached $2,600 in 1970 and $22,700 in 2000.

=== Meritocracy ===
James Bryant Conant, the university's president from 1933 to 1953, pledged to reinvigorate creative scholarship at Harvard and reestablish its preeminence among research institutions. Viewing higher education as a vehicle of opportunity for the talented rather than an entitlement for the wealthy, Conant devised programs to identify, recruit, and support talented youth. In 1943, Conant decided that Harvard's undergraduate curriculum needed to be revised so as to place more emphasis on general education and called on the faculty make a definitive statement about what general education ought to be at the secondary as well as the college level. The resulting Report, published in 1945, was one of the most influential manifestos in the history of American education in the 20th century.

In the decades following the end of World War II, Harvard reformed its admissions policies as it sought students from a more diverse applicant pool. Harvard undergraduates had traditionally been largely upper-class alumni from select New England preparatory schools, including Phillips Exeter Academy, Hotchkiss School, Choate Rosemary Hall, and Milton Academy, increasing numbers of international, minority and working-class students had by the late 1960s altered the ethnic and socio-economic makeup of the college.

The university's faculty also became more diverse, especially in its willingness to hire Jews, Catholics, and foreign scholars. The History Department was among the first to hire Jews. Oscar Handlin, one of the most influential professors in this period, trained hundreds of graduate students, and later served as head of Harvard Library, which is now the largest academic library in the world with over 20 million holdings.

During the 20th century, Harvard's international reputation grew as a burgeoning endowment and prominent professors expanded the university's scope. Explosive growth in the student population continued with the addition of new graduate schools and the expansion of the undergraduate program.

=== Women ===
In 1945, Harvard Medical School admitted its first class of women after a special committee concluded that male students would benefit from learning to view women as equals, that the lower-paid specialties typically shunned by men would benefit from the talents of women doctors and that the weakest third of each entering class of men could be replaced by a superior group of women.

For its first 50 years, Radcliffe College, established in 1879 as the "Harvard Annex for Women", paid Harvard faculty to repeat their lectures for a female audience. During World War II, male and female undergraduates attended classes together for the first time, though it was many decades before the population of Radcliffe College reached parity with that of Harvard. In the 1970s, two agreements between Harvard and Radcliffe made Harvard responsible for essentially all undergraduate matters for women – including admissions, advising, instruction, housing, student life and athletics – though women were still formally admitted to and graduated from Radcliffe until a final merger in 1979 made Radcliffe a part of Harvard, at the same time creating the Radcliffe Institute for Advanced Study.

In 1984, Harvard severed ties with undergraduate "final clubs" because of their refusal to admit women. As of 2016, Harvard bars members of single-sex organizations (such as final clubs, fraternities and sororities) from campus leadership positions such as team captaincies and from receiving recommendation letters from Harvard requisite for scholarships and fellowships such as the Marshall Scholarship and Rhodes Scholarship. After the Supreme Court ruled in Bostock v. Clayton County in June 2020, Harvard independently reversed the sanctions policy.

In 2006, Lawrence Summers resigned his presidency after suggesting that women's underrepresentation in top science positions could be due to differences in "intrinsic aptitude".

=== Minorities ===
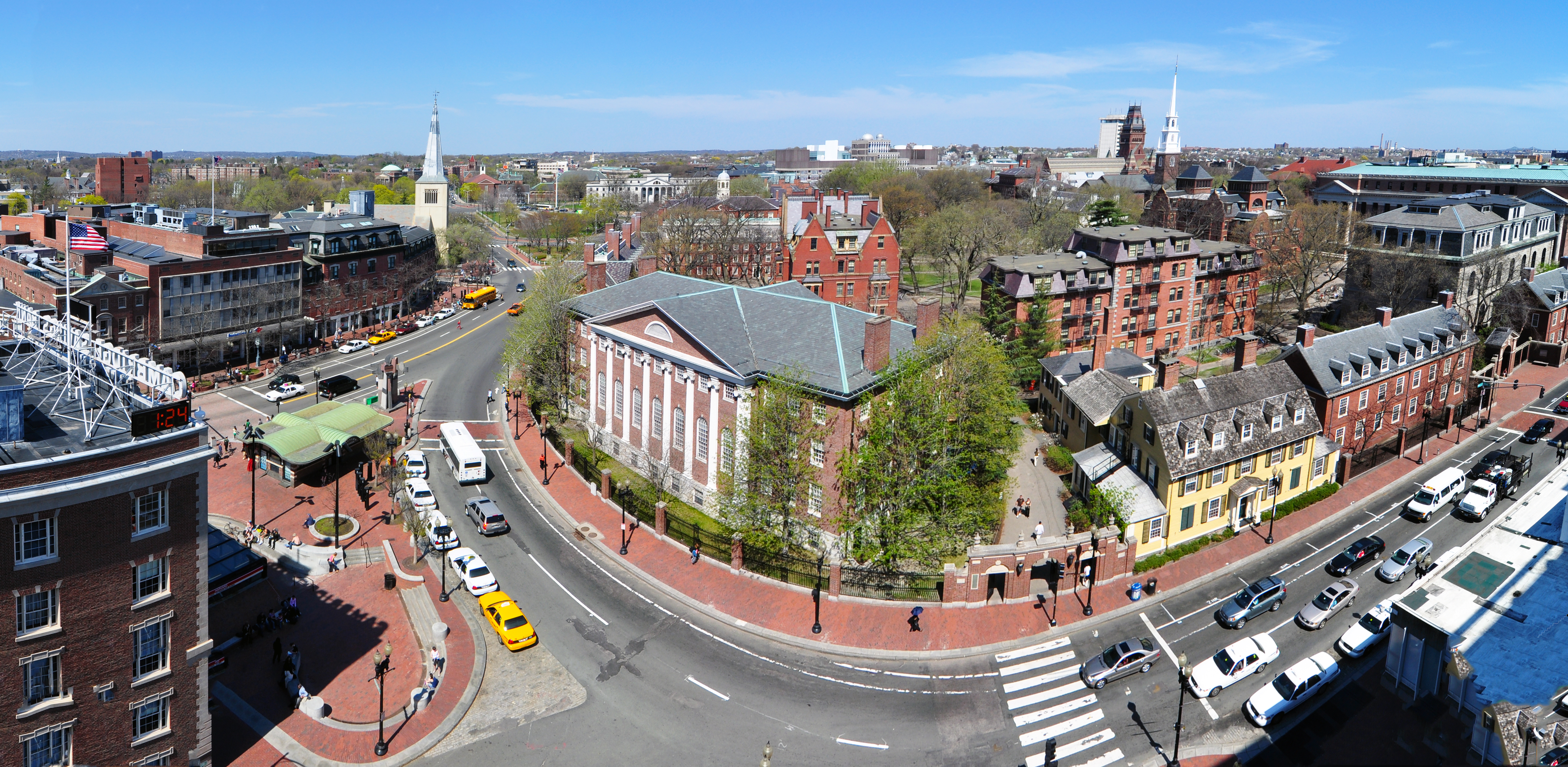
Harvard Yard as seen from Holyoke Center in September 2010

While Harvard ended required chapel in the mid-1880s, the school remained culturally Protestant and fears of dilution grew as enrollment of immigrants, Catholics and Jews surged at the turn of the 20th century. By 1908, Catholics made up nine percent of the freshman class and between 1906 and 1922 Jewish enrollment at Harvard increased from 6% to 25%. President A. Lawrence Lowell tried to impose a 12% quota on Jews, but the faculty rejected it even though he managed to cut the numbers in half anyway. By the end of World War II, the quotas and most of the latent antisemitism had faded away.

Policies of exclusion were not limited to religious minorities. In 1920, "Harvard University maliciously persecuted and harassed" those it believed to be gay via a "Secret Court" led by President Lowell. Summoned at the behest of a wealthy alumnus, the inquisitions and expulsions carried out by this tribunal, in conjunction with the "vindictive tenacity of the university in ensuring that the stigmatization of the expelled students would persist throughout their productive lives" led to two suicides. Harvard President Lawrence Summers characterized the 1920 episode as "part of a past that we have rightly left behind" and "abhorrent and an affront to the values of our university". As late as the 1950s, Wilbur Bender, then the dean of admissions for Harvard College, was seeking better ways to "detect homosexual tendencies and serious psychiatric problems" in prospective students.

== 21st century ==
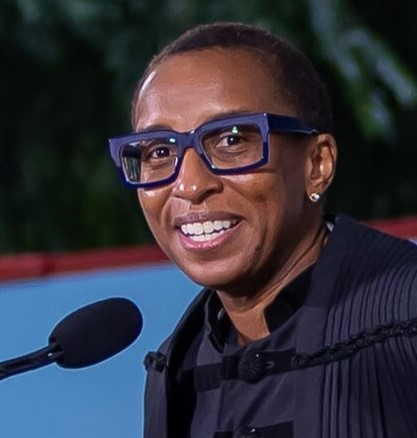
Claudine Gay, Harvard's 30th president, who resigned in January 2024 amidst allegations of antisemitism and plagiarism

In 2008, Evelynn M. Hammonds became the first woman and first African American dean of Harvard College.

In October 2023, following the Hamas-led attack on Israel, several Harvard undergraduate student groups signed a letter condemning Israel, contending that the "Israeli regime entirely responsible for all unfolding violence". The letter from Harvard University student groups blaming Israel drew backlash from several prominent alumni and former Harvard president Larry Summers, who said that he was "sickened" by it. Subsequently, a number of donors said they would no longer donate to Harvard, due to its poor response against anti-semitism, and billionaire Idan Ofer and his wife Batia quit Harvard's executive board.

In December 2023, following Congressional hearing on antisemitism, Harvard's president Claudine Gay was condemned by the White House, and Gay released a new statement noting that some “have confused a right to free expression with the idea that Harvard will condone calls for violence against Jewish students.” At the hearing, Gay had expressed the view that calls for the genocide of Jewish people did not necessarily violate Harvard's code of conduct, "depending on the context." In January 2024, after just six months as Harvard president, Gay resigned in January 2024 after the plagiarism investigation, and was replaced by Alan Garber, the university's president, who was appointed interim president. In August 2024, Harvard Corporation announced his appointment as the university's 31st president through the end of the 2026–27 academic year.

In April 2025, the Trump administration requested that Harvard implement changes in policies regarding curriculum, hiring and admissions. Harvard refused these requests and in response, the Trump administration stated it would attempt to withhold $2 billion in federal funding from Harvard as well as revoke its tax-exempt status.

== Graduate schools ==
=== Harvard Business School ===
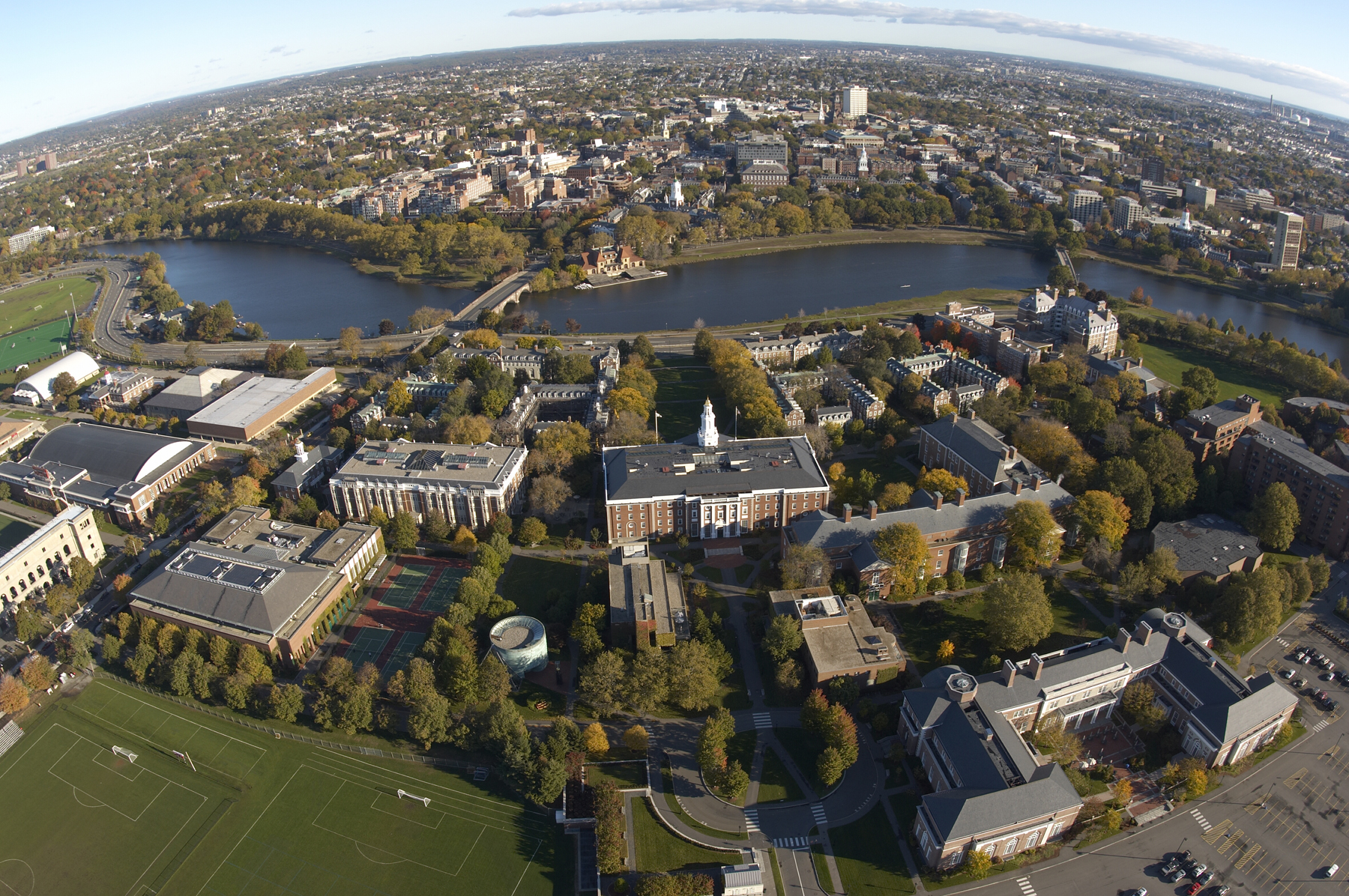
Aerial view of Harvard Business School

From its founding in 1908, Harvard Business School has had a close relationship with the corporate world. Within a few years of its founding, many business leaders were its alumni and were hiring other alumni for starting positions in their firms. The School used Rockefeller funding in the 1920s to launch a major research program under Elton Mayo (1926–1947) for his "Harvard human relations group". Its findings revolutionized human relations in business and raised the reputation of the Business School from its initial "low status as a trainer of money grabbers into a high prestige educator of socially-conscientious administrators". Starting in 1935, the school began weekend and short-term leadership training workshops for executives of major corporations that further expanded its national role.

By 1949, nearly half of all the holders of the MBA degree in the U.S. were alumni of Harvard Business School, and it was considered "the most influential graduate school of business".

=== Harvard Graduate School of Arts and Science ===
As the college modernized in the late 19th century, the faculty was organized into departments and began to add graduate programs, including the PhD. Charles William Eliot, president from 1869 to 1909, was a chemist who had spent two years in Germany studying their universities. Thousands of Americans, mostly Harvard and Yale alumni, had attended German universities, especially Berlin and Göttingen. Eliot used the German model to set up graduate programs at Harvard and he formed a graduate department in 1872, which granted its first Ph.D. degrees in 1873 to William Byerly in mathematics and Charles Whitney in history. Eliot set up the Graduate School of Arts and Sciences with its own dean and budget in 1890, which dealt with graduate students and funded research programs.

By 2004, there were 3,200 graduate students in 53 separate programs and forty former or current professors had won a Nobel Prize, most of them scientists or economists based in the Graduate School of Arts and Sciences.

=== Harvard Kennedy School ===
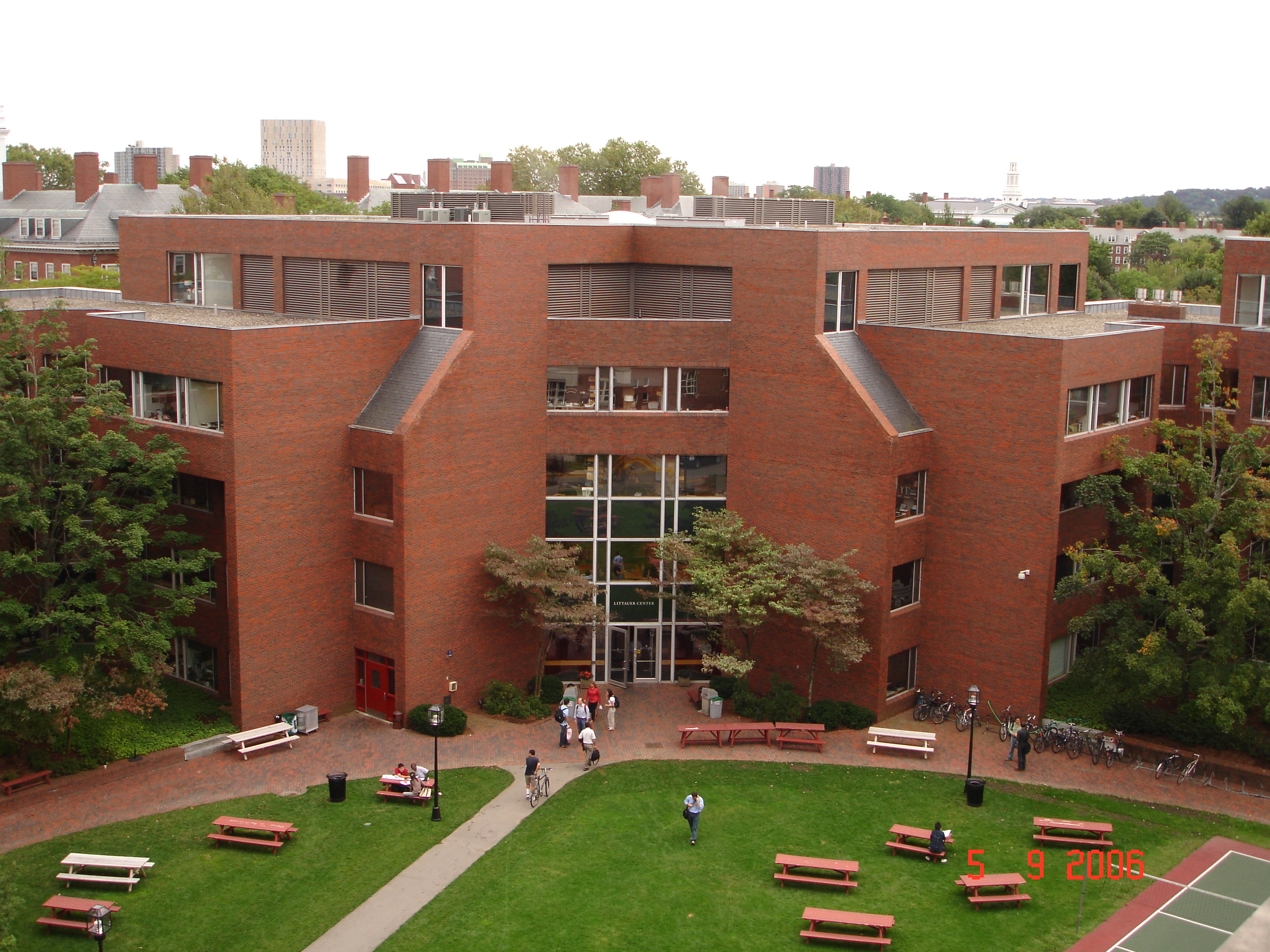
The Littauer Building at Harvard Kennedy School

In 1936, Harvard University founded the Harvard Graduate School of Public Administration, later renamed Harvard Kennedy School in honor of former U.S. President and 1940 Harvard College alumnus John F. Kennedy. The Kennedy School has an endowment of $1.7 billion as of 2021 and is routinely ranked at the top of the world's graduate schools in public policy, social policy, international affairs, and government. Its alumni include 17 heads of state or government.

=== Harvard Law School ===
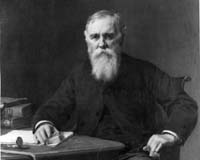
Christopher Columbus Langdell, an influential dean of Harvard Law School from 1875 to 1890

The establishment of Harvard Law School in 1817 was made possible by a 1779 bequest from Isaac Royall Jr.; it is the oldest continuously operating law school in the nation. It was a small operation and grew slowly. By 1827, it was down to one faculty member. Nathan Dane, a prominent alumnus, endowed the Dane Professorship of Law and insisted that it be given to then Supreme Court Justice Joseph Story. For a while, the school was called Dane Law School. Story's belief in the need for an elite law school based on merit and dedicated to public service helped build the school's reputation at the time. Enrollment remained low as academic legal education was considered to be of little added benefit to apprenticeships in legal practice.

Radical reform came in the 1870s, under Dean Christopher Columbus Langdell (1826–1906). Its new curriculum set the national standard and was copied widely in the United States. Langdell developed the case method of teaching law, based on his belief that law could be studied as a "science" gave university legal education a reason for being distinct from vocational preparation. The school introduced a first-year curriculum that was widely imitated, based on classes in contracts, property, torts, criminal law and civil procedure.

Critics bemoaned abandonment of the more traditional lecture method, because of its efficiency and the lower workloads it placed on faculty and students. Advocates of the case method had a sounder theoretical basis in scientific research and the inductive method. Langdell's graduates became leading professors at other law schools where they introduced the case method. From its founding in 1900, the Association of American Law Schools promoted the case method in law schools that sought accreditation.

=== Harvard Medical School ===
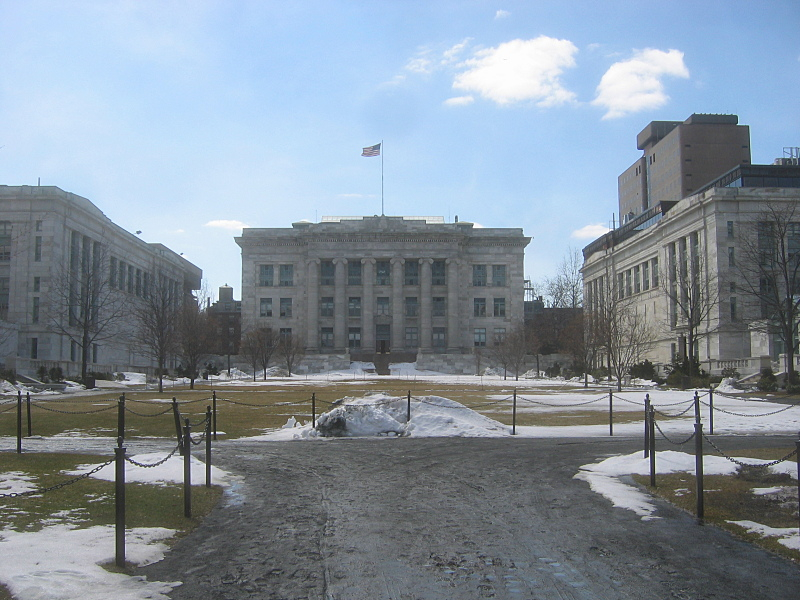
Harvard Medical School

Harvard Medical School, the third-oldest medical school in the United States, was founded in 1782 as Massachusetts Medical College by John Warren, Benjamin Waterhouse, and Aaron Dexter. In 1810, Harvard Medical School relocated across the Charles River from Cambridge to Boston. The medical school was tied to the rest of the university "only by the tenuous thread of degrees", but its strong faculty gave it a national reputation by the early 19th century.

The medical school moved to its current location on Longwood Avenue in 1906, where the "Great White Quadrangle" or HMS Quad with its five white marble buildings was established.

Harvard Medical School's reputation continued to grow into the 20th century, especially in terms of scientific research and support from regional and national elites. Fifteen scientists won the Nobel Prize for work done at the Medical School. Its four major flagship teaching hospitals are Beth Israel Deaconess Medical Center, Brigham and Women's Hospital, Boston Children's Hospital and Massachusetts General Hospital.

=== Harvard T.H. Chan School of Public Health ===
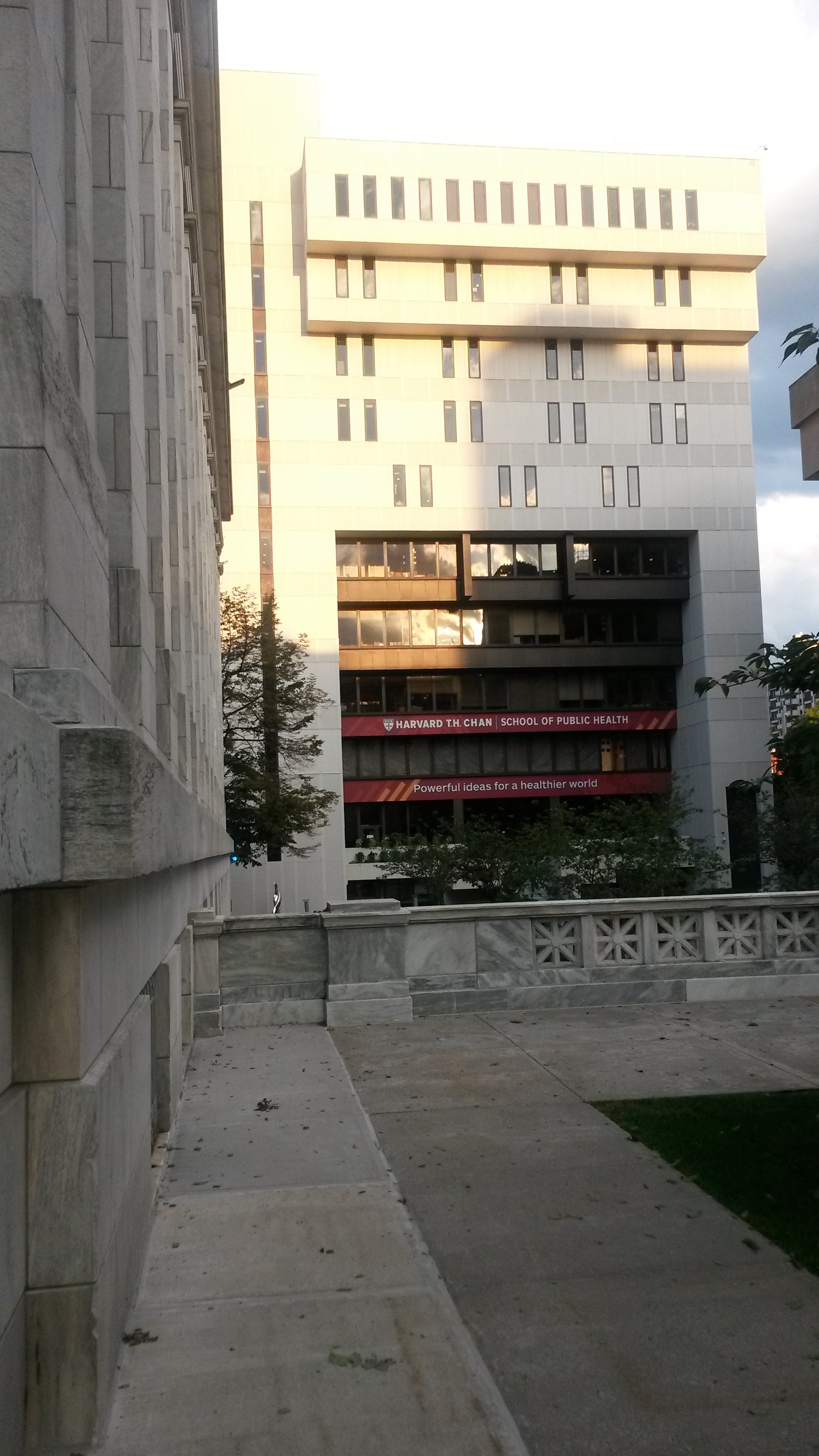
HSPH Courtyard Entrance from Harvard Medical School

The Harvard T.H. Chan School of Public Health is the public health school of Harvard University, located in the Longwood Medical Area of Boston. The school grew out of the Harvard-MIT School for Health Officers, the nation's first graduate training program in population health, which was founded in 1913 and then became the Harvard School of Public Health in 1922.

The school was part of Harvard Medical School until 1946, when it became a fully autonomous institution with its own dedicated public health and medical faculty. It was renamed the Harvard T.H. Chan School of Public Health in 2014 in honor of a $350 million donation from the Morningside Foundation.

== See also ==
- History and traditions of Harvard commencements
- Harvard University and the Vietnam War
- 2023 United States Congress hearings on antisemitism

== Works cited ==
- Smith, Frank (1936). A History of Dedham, Massachusetts. Transcript Press, Incorporated.
