= Edward Holyoke =

American clergyman (1689–1769

The Reverend Edward Holyoke
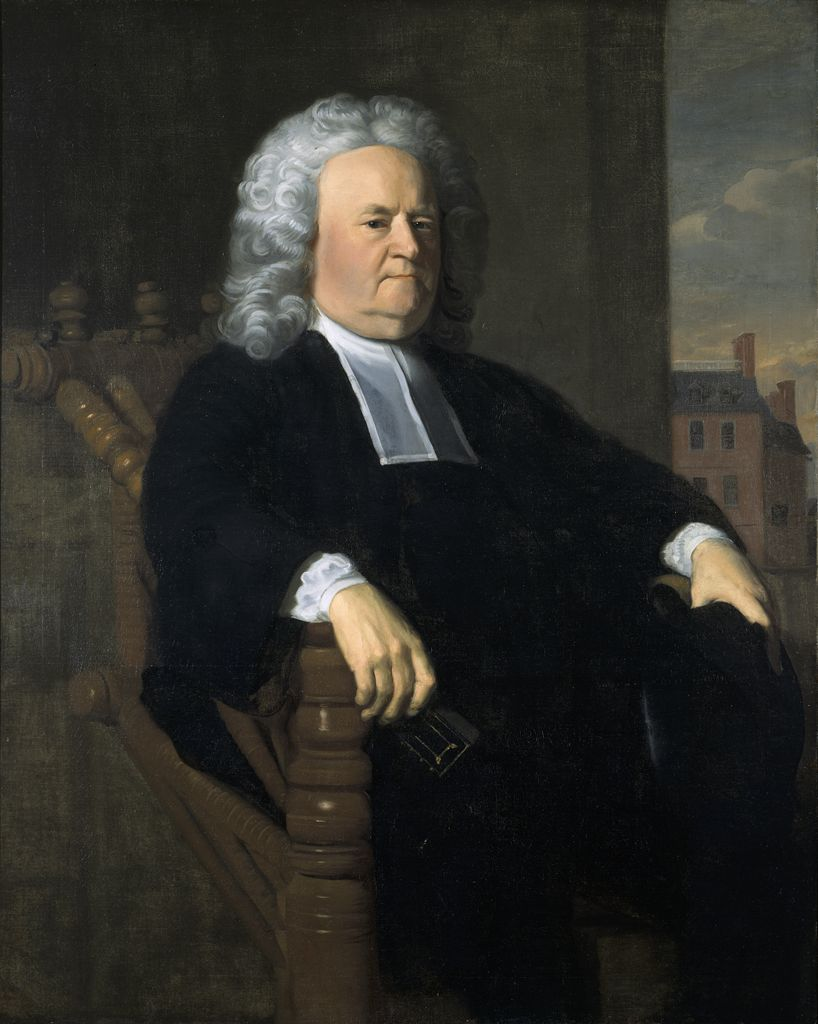
- Portrait by John Singleton Copley, 1759–1761

President of Harvard College
- In office 1737–1769
- Preceded by: Benjamin Wadsworth
- Succeeded by: John Winthrop acting

Personal details
- Born: June 26, 1689
- Died: June 1, 1769 (aged 79)

Edward Holyoke (June 26, 1689 – June 1, 1769) was an American Congregationalist clergyman who served as the president of Harvard College from 1737 to 1769.

== Biography ==
Coat of Arms of Edward Holyoke

Edward Holyoke was the son of a wealthy and influential businessman, Elizur Holyoke Jr, who held several local town offices and served in the legislature. He is also the grandson of Elizur Holyoke Sr., of Springfield, Massachusetts — notable due to the fact Mount Holyoke and Holyoke, Massachusetts are attributed to him.

Edward was educated at North Grammar School, Boston, and then went directly to Harvard College, graduating in 1705 at age 16, he also gave the class' Bachelor's Oration. While at Harvard, Holyoke "had had the distinction, as an undergraduate, of having more fines and black marks recorded against his name for breaches of discipline than any student of his day. In 1708, he received his M.A from Harvard College. From 1709-1712 he was the Librarian at Harvard and between 1712-1716 he was a tutor (instructor), and (1713 - 1716) he was a Fellow of the Corporation (Harvard).

In 1714 he also became a candidate for colleague pastor with Rev. Samuel Cheever of Marblehead, but the majority of the church favored another candidate. The minority that favored Holyoke withdrew and formed a second church which Edward was ordained as Congregational pastor for the Second Church of Marblehead on April 25, 1716, and he served the Second Church of Marblehead for 21 years.

In 1736, he was appointed and then approved by Governor Belcher as the choice as President of Harvard College. The General Court agreed to pay Marblehead Society 140 pounds "to encourage and facilitate the settlement of a minister there ..." Holyoke became the 9th President of Harvard College (1737–1769), succeeding after Benjamin Wadsworth death. Holyoke's administration began during the religious revivals of the Great Awakening and lasted until the revolutionary controversy with England was entering its final phase. He immediately gained notoriety with his election-day sermon delivered before the Governor and General Court in which he boldly declared:

All forms of government originate from the people ... As these forms have originated from the people, doubtless they may be changed whensoever the body of them choose, to make such an alteration.

and as a liberal in politics, Holyoke was also an eloquent spokesman of new spirit of toleration that was softening the strict tenets of New England Calvinism. To minister or pastors, he had insisted on occasions, that governments

should have no hand in making any laws with regard to the spiritual affairs of their people ... [and] have no right to impose their interpretations of the laws of Christ upon their flocks ... Every Man therefore is to judge for himself in these things.

At first, there were about 100 students at Harvard being taught by the president and four tutors. As president, Holyoke was essentially the chairman of the Harvard Corporation, for which he is responsible to the day-to-day operation of the college, but he was also expected to teach. During Holyoke's administration several reforms were undertaken to improve the intellectual climate at the College. The ancient system of each tutor taking a college class through all the subjects in a curriculum was ended, and by 1767 tutors had become specialists instructing students in particular subjects. Moreover, merit, rather than solely birth and social standing, became the criteria for entrance to Harvard College. College history prizes were offered for scholarships, and the custom of flogging students for college offenses was abandoned. Apparently, teaching was not limited to the college, but included studies at his home;

"The Harvard that John Adams went to in 1750 was undergoing one of its periodic reformations, this time under the presidency of Edward Holyoke, class of 1705." "Through John Adams' four years at Harvard, the first Saturday "was given over to the study of theology under President Holyoke's supervision."

Holyoke encouraged broader intellectual exploration beyond curriculum and disciplinary changes. In 1755, the Dudleian Lecture was given for the first time by the College President. In 1756, in order to improve English oratory, a system of public exhibitions was introduced. Lasting for over a century, selected students participated in debates, orations, and dialogues in the English language. In 1761, John Winthrop, the Hollis Professor of Mathematics and Natural Philosophy, arranged the first American astronomical expedition to observe Venus's transit over the Sun. While not considered an intellect by his contemporaries, Holyoke did strengthen Harvard's academic program in mathematics and science, and during his tenure Harvard established the first laboratory for experimental physics in North America.

Holyoke's presidency was not without some controversy. In the early 1740s, the revivalist George Whitefield came to Cambridge to preach. Although Holyoke at first welcomed Whitefield to Harvard College, he eventually turned against him because Holyoke perceived Whitefield's religious views as excessive, inspiring division among families and local churches. Moreover, Holyoke took exception to Whitefield's labeling of Harvard College as a house of impiety and sin. In 1744, Holyoke and other members of the faculty defended the college and warned the local churches against Whitefield's views in The Testimony of the President, Professors, Tutors and Hebrew Instructor of Harvard College, Cambridge, Against the Reverend Mr. George Whitefield, And His Conduct. This rebuttal to Whitefield sparked a yearlong pamphlet war between both sides. Despite Holyoke's differences with George Whitefield, when a fire destroyed the College's original library twenty years later in 1764, Whitefield came to the College's aid and donated books and money to help rebuild the library collection.

"The fact that Harvard had moved a long way from the strict faith of the fathers, under Edward's "catholic temper" all manner of heresies flourished, or if they were not encouraged, were not firmly suppressed. Yale was the only stronghold of orthodoxy." "Much was said, both in approval and censure of the President's "catholic temper," which soon affected the intellectual climate of the college. He had, moreover, "a good spirit of government."

While at times he was a firm disciplinarian, many considered him a kindly man "of a noble commanding presence." In his company students must stand or uncover. His girth won him the irreverent student nickname of "guts." He was characterized as an honest man of sound judgment and zealous in the performance of his duties. He had an ability to deal with a society of scholars, Holyoke's leadership led Harvard College through turbulent and changing times. Under his administration, Harvard College prospered and flourished. The number of students increased, gifts and endowments were added to the treasury, and intellectual training was improved. During Holyoke's tenure the College itself also expanded. Holden Chapel (1744) and Hollis Hall (1763) were built.

Edward Holyoke was President of Harvard College for thirty-two years, which included teaching all but one Massachusetts Revolutionary leaders — Samuel Adams (A.B. 1740), James Otis (A.B. 1743), Jonathan Mayhew (A.B. 1744), Thomas Cushing (A.B. 1744), James Bowdoin (A.B. 1745), John Hancock (A.B. 1754), John Adams (A.B. 1755), Joseph Warren (A.B. 1759) and Josiah Quincy Jr. (A.B. 1763). Other notable New England names were John Wentworth, Samuel Quincy, Moses Hemmenway, Charles Cushing, Nathan Webb, William Browne, Philip Livingston, David Sewall, Daniel Treadwell, Tristam Dalton. His long tenure as president was the longest in Harvard's history, until Charles Eliot began his record-setting forty-year presidency a century later. However, Holyoke is still considered the oldest person to occupy the presidency of Harvard.

== See also ==
- Holyoke Chair

== Sources ==
- Holyoke, A North American Family 1637 - 1992, John Gibbs Holyoke, Gateway Press, Inc. (Baltimore, 1993), First.

Academic offices
Preceded by Benjamin Wadsworth	President of Harvard College; 1737–1769	Succeeded by John Winthrop, acting
