= Morris H. Morgan =

American classical scholar (1859–1910)

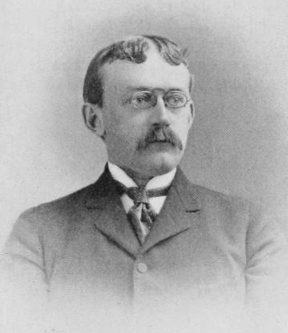
- c. 1899
- Born: Morris Hicky Morgan; February 8, 1859; Providence, Rhode Island, US
- Died: March 16, 1910 (aged 51); Newport, Rhode Island, US
- Education: Harvard College
- Occupation: Academic

Morris Hicky Morgan (February 8, 1859 – March 16, 1910) was an American academic, professor of classical philology at Harvard University.

== Life ==
Morris H. Morgan was born in Providence, Rhode Island on February 8, 1859. Immediately after graduating from Harvard College, he was appointed to the teaching staff. After the death of Frederic D. Allen in 1899 he succeeded to the chair of classical philology. He was praised by his fellow classicists as an interpreter of Vitruvius. His translation of Vitruvius's The Ten Books of Architecture, based on an older translation by Valentine Rose (second edition, Leipzig, 1899), remains in print today, though he died before completing it, the final parts being translated by Albert A. Howard. In a note to a 2009 English edition, translator Richard Schofield writes that Morgan's translation "is certainly the best in English and deserves its longevity ... and I doubt if his dignified and intelligent prose could be surpassed, even though here and there it is faintly dated."

In 1896 he was appointed Harvard University Marshall.

Morgan fell seriously ill on March 15, 1910 while on a trip to New York. He died in Newport the following day.
