= John Harvard (disambiguation) =

John Harvard (1607–1638) was an English clergyman and philanthropist.

John Harvard may also refer to:

- Statue of John Harvard, a statue of the university's benefactor, in Harvard Yard, Cambridge, Massachusetts
- John Harvard Mall, plaza in Boston, Massachusetts, U.S. named after the clergyman
- John Harvard Library, library in Southwark, London named after the clergyman
- SS John Harvard, a EC2-S-C1 standard Liberty ship built in 1942 and named in his honor
- John Harvard, the mascot of Harvard University's Harvard Crimson athletic teams
- John Harvard (politician) (1938–2016), journalist, politician and office holder in Manitoba, Canada
