= Clio (Hendrik Goltzius) =

1592 engraving by Hendrik Goltzius

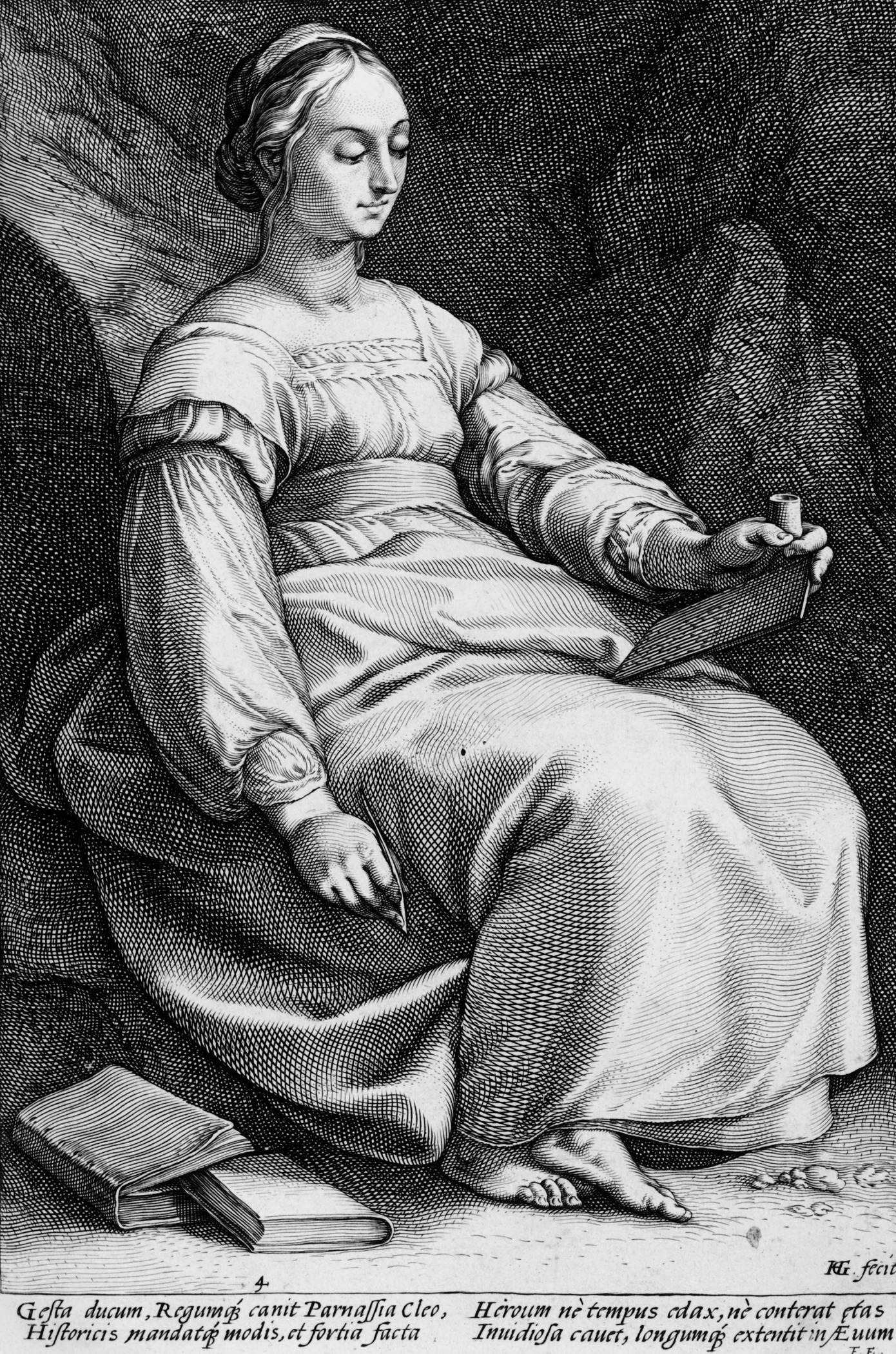
- Artist: Hendrik Goltzius
- Year: 1592

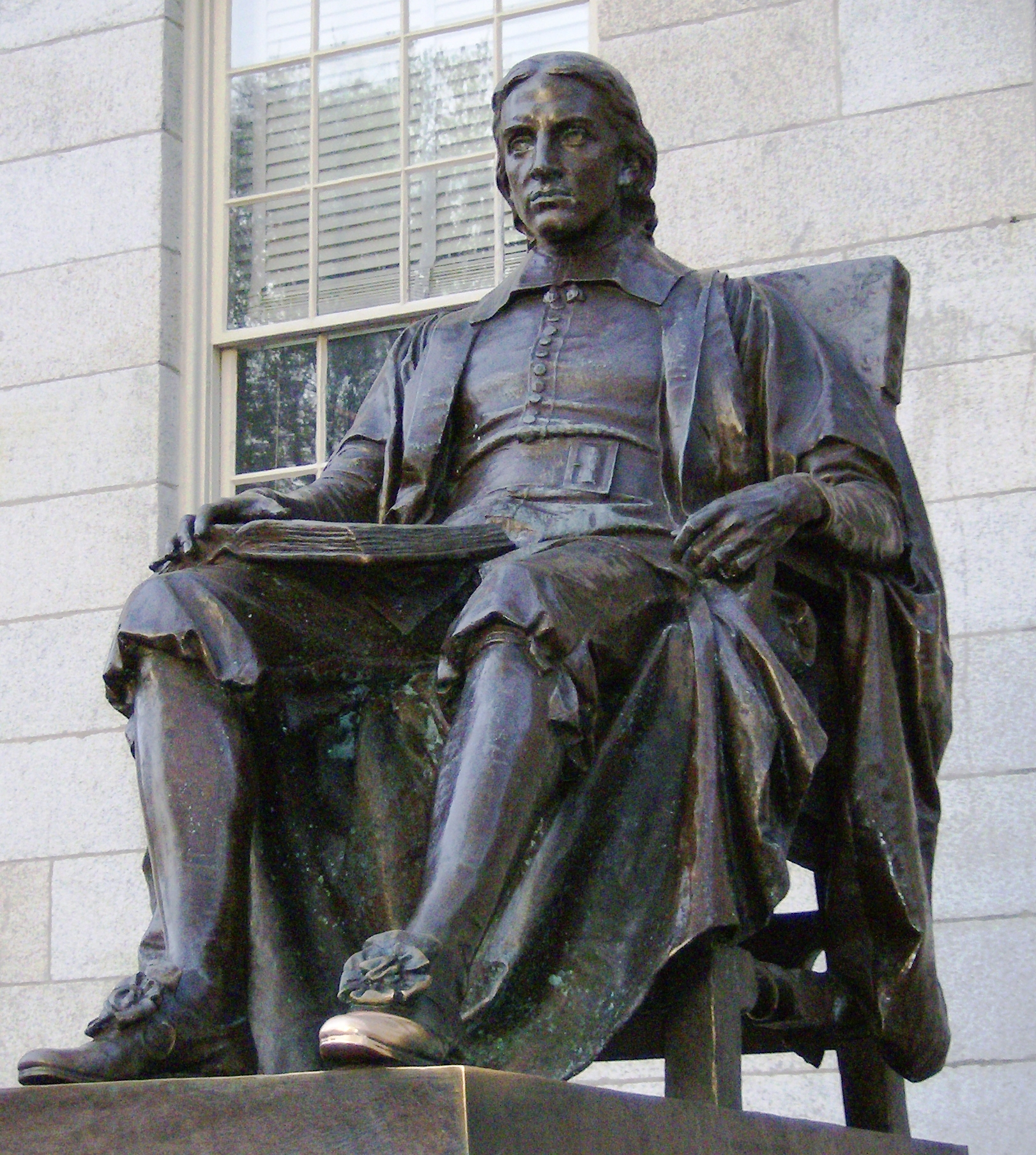
Daniel Chester French's 1884 John Harvard, a book on his lap and two more (unseen) on the floor to his right, "raises his contemplative eye to the spaces of all wisdom."

Hendrik Goltzius' engraving of Clio is the fourth in his series on the nine Muses, and was executed in 1592.

== Description ==
The engraving depicts the Greek muse of history seated, holding a pen in her right hand and a tablet and inkwell in her left, with two books at her feet. She is drawn, wrote historian Natalie Zemon Davis, "with a faint smile, perhaps ironic, certainly detached. From this picture, it is only a short step to some Renaissance representations of History as a winged woman writing, her white garb signifying that she bears witness to truth as well as to renown."

Four lines about Clio, in Latin hexameter by 16th-century Dutch poet Franco van Est (Franco Estius), form a caption at the bottom of the engraving. They read:

Gesta ducum, Regumque canit Parnassia Cleo,
Historicis mandatque modis, et fortia facta
Heroum nec tempus edax, nec conterat [a]etas
Inuidiosa cauet, longumque exten[d]it in Æuum

Or, in an approximate translation into English,

Cleo from Parnassus sings of the deeds of leaders and kings,
And she molds them into the genre of history.
She watches that neither devouring time nor begrudging age would wear away the brave feats of heroes,
and extends (those feats) into the depths of time.

== Context ==
The series was printed in folio size, and was dedicated to Goltzius's friend and fellow engraver Jan Sadeler. It was one of several series of engravings that Goltzius made upon returning to his home in Haarlem after spending the years 1590–1591 studying art in Italy, where he came under the influence of a school of engraving founded by his fellow Dutchman Cornelis Cort.

== Holdings ==
Prints of the work are held by the Dutch Rijksmuseum, the British Museum, the National Gallery of Art (Washington, D.C.), the Los Angeles County Museum of Art, and the Harvard Art Museums. The engraving has been printed in five different states; the British Museum has the second state, for instance, while the Harvard Art Museums have the third.

== Related works ==
Laurel Thatcher Ulrich has proposed Goltzius' figure as an inspiration for Daniel Chester French's 1884 bronze John Harvard, which shows John Harvard in a similar pose and with similar accoutrements.
