= Statue of John Harvard =

Statue in Cambridge, Massachusetts, US

Coordinates: 42.37447°N 71.11719°W

John Harvard
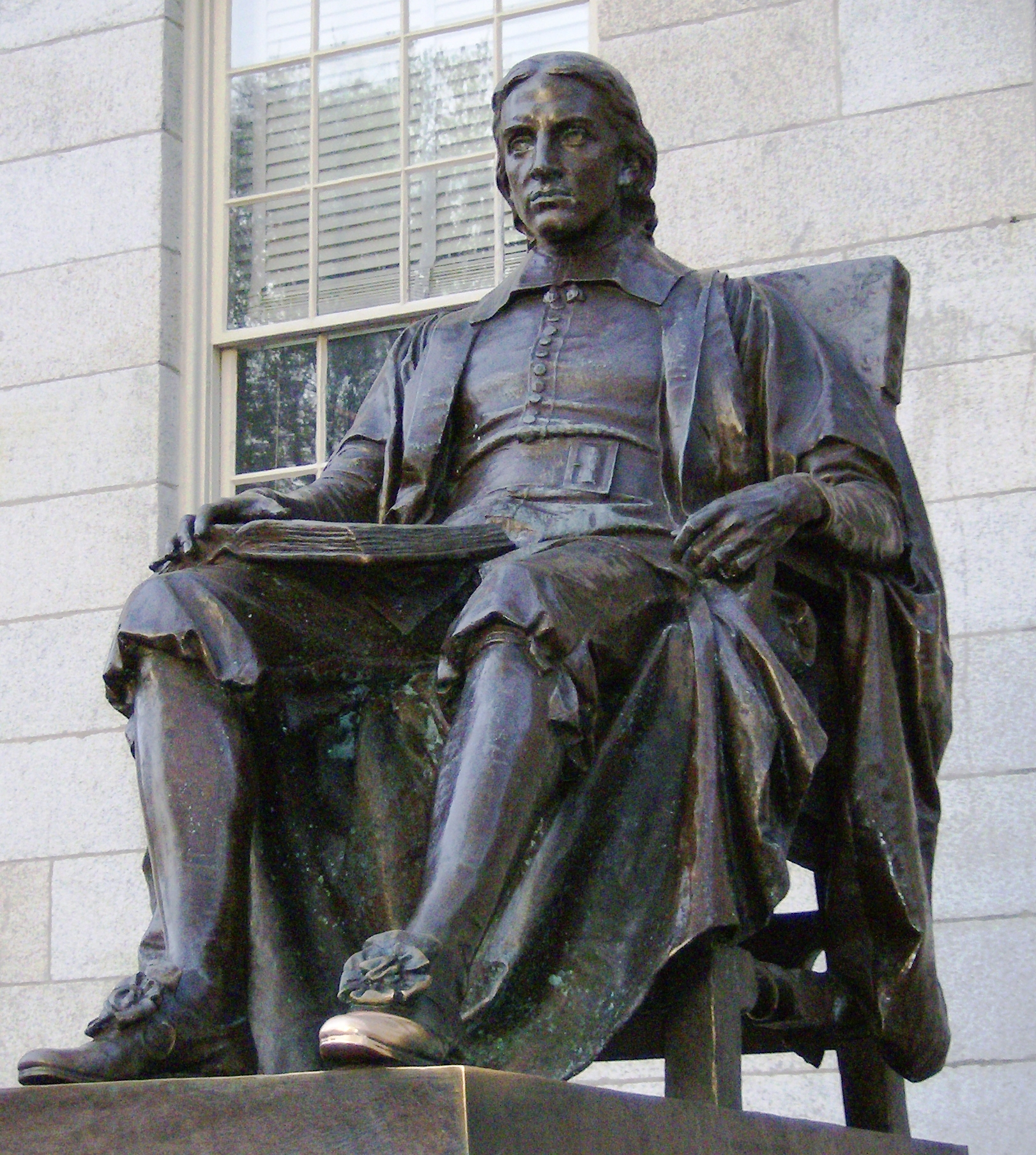
- "He ... gazes for a moment into the future, so dim, so uncertain, yet so full of promise, promise which has been more than realized", said George Ellis at the dedication. (Note: While Memorial of John Harvard ^{[M]} quotes Ellis as saying John Harvard "raises his contemplative eye to the spaces of all wisdom", the Harvard Crimson relates that Ellis imagined that the figure "gazes for a moment into the future".)
- Artists: Daniel Chester French (sculptor); Henry-Bonnard Bronze Company (foundry)
- Year: 1884
- Type: Bronze
- Dimensions: Figure: 71 by 38.6 by 65 in (180 by 98 by 165 cm); Plinth: 61 by 72 by 12 in (155 by 183 by 30 cm)
- Location: Harvard Yard, Cambridge, Massachusetts, US

John Harvard is an 1884 sculpture in bronze by Daniel Chester French at Harvard University in Cambridge, Massachusetts. It honors clergyman John Harvard (1607–1638), whose substantial deathbed bequest to the "schoale or Colledge" recently undertaken by the Massachusetts Bay Colony was so gratefully received that the Colony resolved "that the Colledge agreed upon formerly to bee built at Cambridg shalbee called Harvard Colledge." There being nothing to indicate what John Harvard had looked like, French took inspiration from a Harvard student collaterally descended from an early Harvard president.

The statue's inscription‍—‌JOHN HARVARD • FOUNDER • 1638‍—‌is the subject of an arch polemic traditionally recited for visitors, questioning whether John Harvard justly merits the honorific founder. According to a Harvard official, the founding of the college was not the act of one but the work of many, and John Harvard is therefore considered not the founder, but rather a founder, of the school, though the timeliness and generosity of his contribution have made him the most honored of these.

Tourists often rub the toe of John Harvard's left shoe for luck in the mistaken belief that doing so is a Harvard student tradition.

== Composition ==
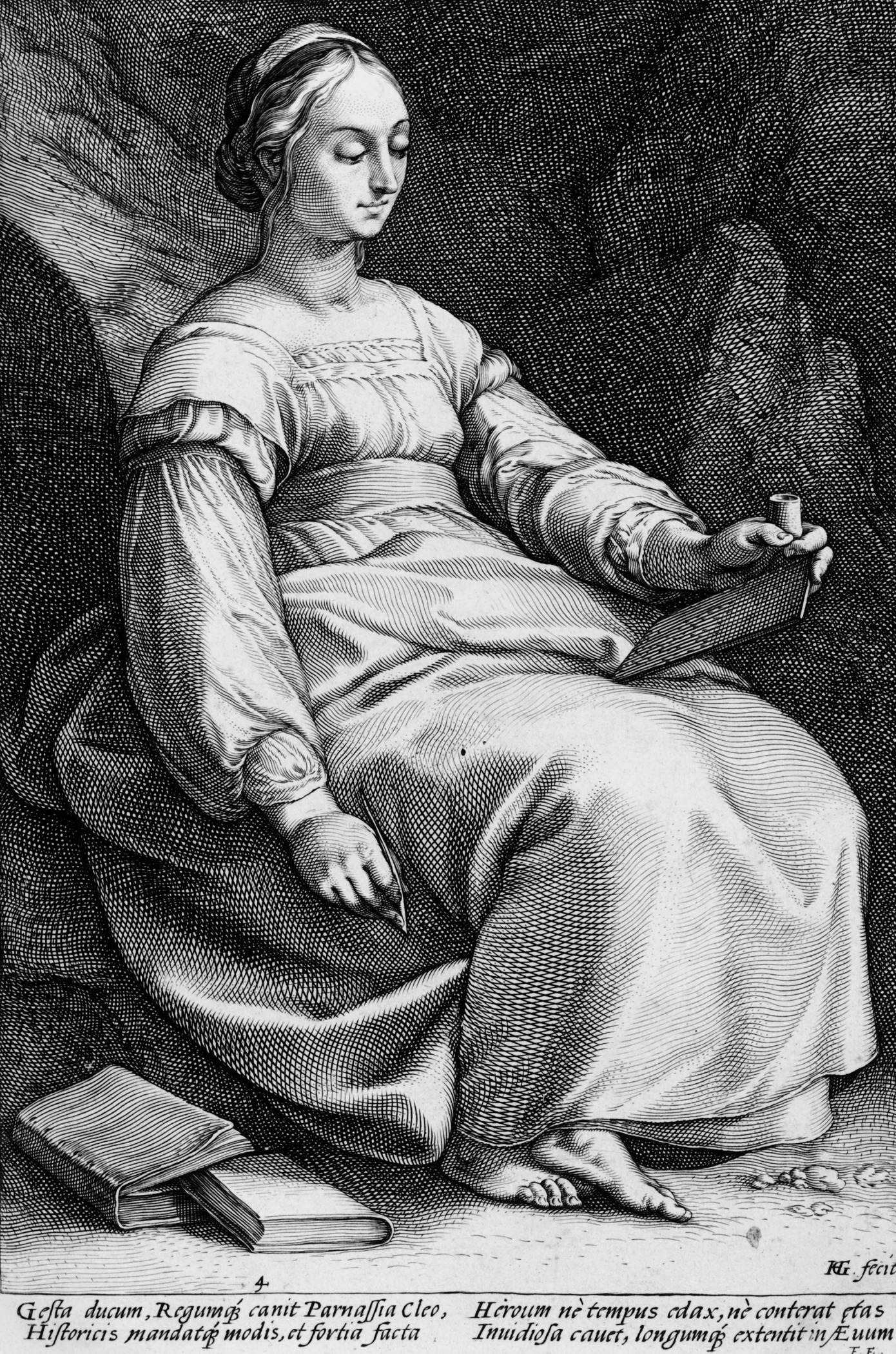
Hendrik Goltzius' Clio

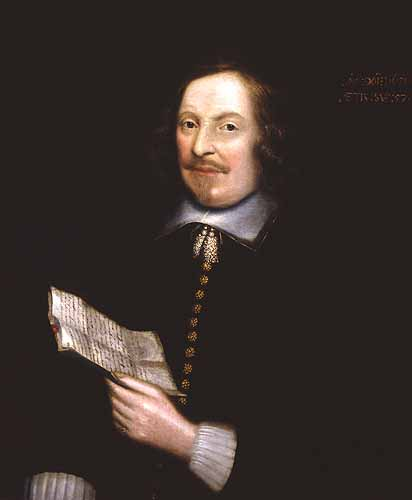
Portrait (artist unknown) of Edward Winslow

The New York Times described the statue at its unveiling:

The young clergyman is represented sitting, holding an open [book] on his knee. The costume is the simple clerical garb of the seventeenth century ... low shoes, long, silk hose, loose knee breeches, and a tunic belted at the waist, while a long cloak, thrown back, falls in broad, picturesque folds. (Note: "The John Harvard Statue" (PDF). The New York Times. October 18, 1884. In quoting this passage the word book has been substituted for Bible per the unanimity of other sources,^{[M]} all of which refer to the volume held by the figure as a book or tome, but not specifically a Bible. In the planning of the costume, "It was understood that Harvard was a clergyman educated at Cambridge, and, following as he did the fortunes of other clergymen who came to Massachusetts in the early period, he would be likely to be a Puritan of their stamp,‍—‌that is to say, not a Separatist. Pictures represent the Puritan minister of that day as wearing a somewhat closely fitting cloak, covering perhaps a cassock, with a broad linen collar and a skull-cap. The narrow bands and the wig came in later. No mistake could be made in the garment worn over the lower part of the body." That John Harvard is wearing a skullcap is frequently overlooked. "Edward T. Wilcox, A.M. '49 ... had a 38-year tenure at the College, during which he no doubt won many a highball with the following challenge [which he repeated during remarks at a 1974 ceremony honoring long-serving University employees]. 'How many of you would be prepared to bet one way or the other ... if I told you John Harvard is actually wearing a cap?'" Other subtle details are a slight mustache, tassels at the collar, and "roselike decorations" on the shoes.)

John Harvard's gift to the school was £780 and‍—‌perhaps more importantly^{[M]}‍—‌his 400-volume scholar's library:

Partly under the chair, within easy reach, lie a pile of books.

That he had died of tuberculosis, at about age thirty, was one of the few things known about John Harvard at the time of the statue's composition; as dedication orator George Edward Ellis put it:

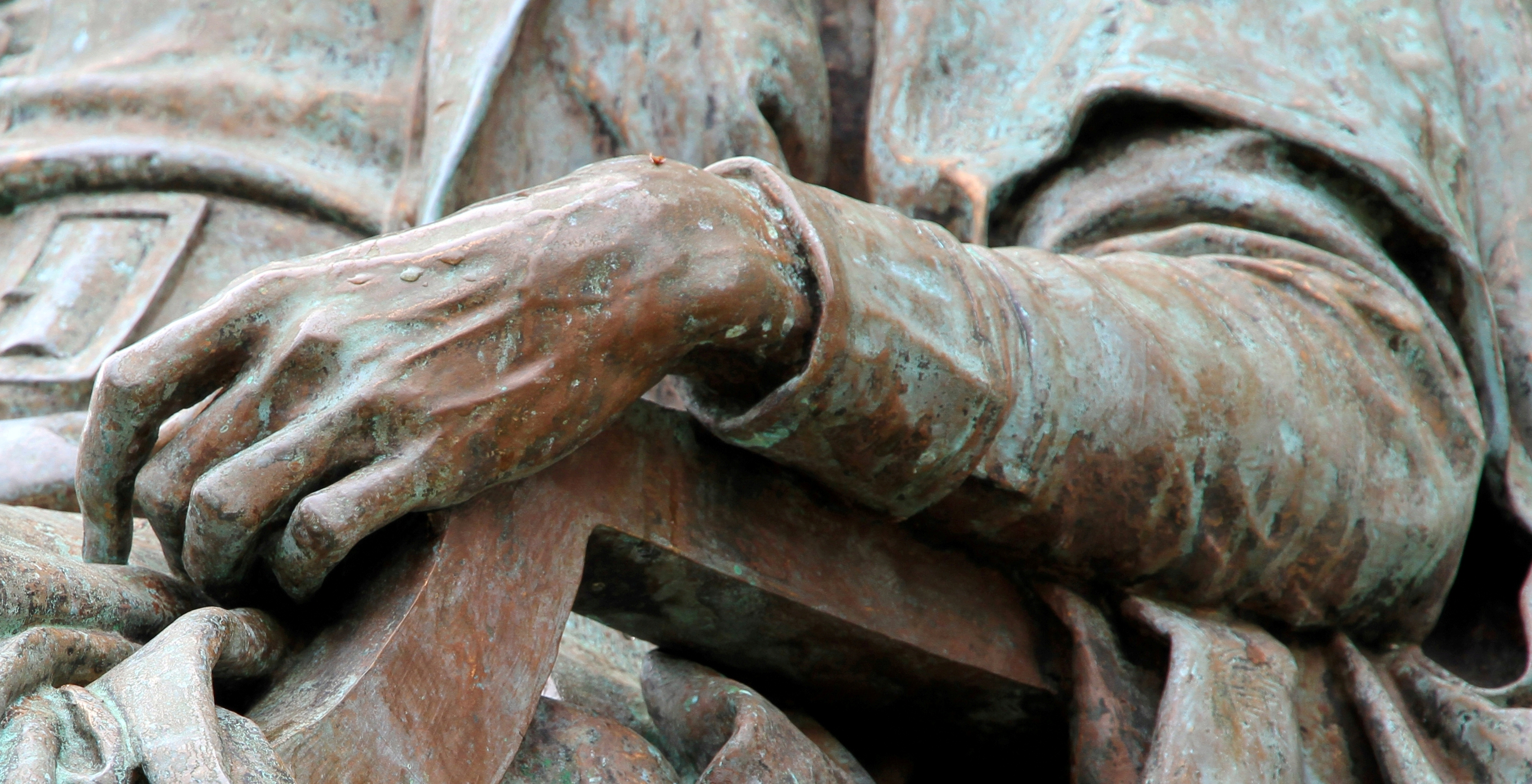
Gently touched by the weakness which was wasting his immature life, (Note: Per Memorial of John Harvard,^{[M]} Ellis spoke of illness threatening Harvard's "immature" life, but the Crimson reporter understood Ellis to be speaking of Harvard's "miniature" life. "If I remember aright," French was quoted in 1899 as saying, John Harvard "is described as being 'reverend, godly, and a lover of learning,' and it is known that he died at an early age (about thirty) of consumption, which gave a clue to his physique." (French's daughter wrote of the figure's "beautiful, wasted hand ... the hands were thin and nervous"; Shand-Tucci mentions the "scrawny calves.") French continued, "It may possibly be of interest that my regular model for the statue, except the face, was a young Englishman, a graduate of Oxford, who was temporarily embarrassed financially and took this means of earning his bread.") he rests for a moment from his converse with wisdom on the printed page, and raises his contemplative eye to the spaces of all wisdom.

Historian Laurel Ulrich suggests that John Harvard's general composition may have been inspired by Hendrik Goltzius' engraving of Clio (the Greek muse of history), and that the figure's collar, buttons, tassel, and mustache may have been taken from a portrait of Plymouth Colony Governor Edward Winslow.

== History ==
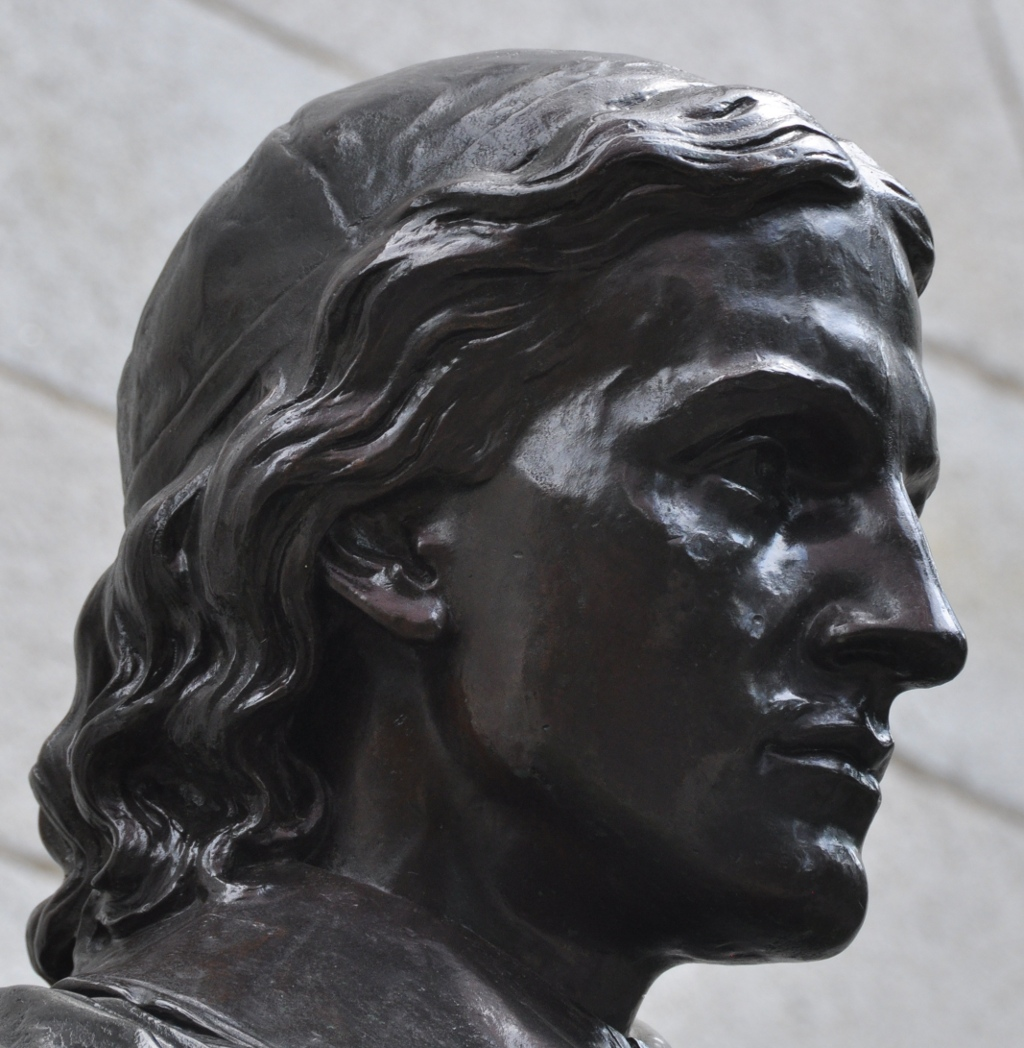
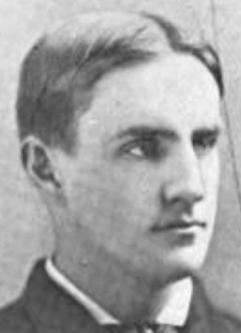
Harvard student Sherman Hoar was the inspiration for John Harvard's face.

On June 27, 1883, at the Commencement Day dinner of Harvard alumni a letter was read^{[M]} from "a generous benefactor, General Samuel James Bridge, an adopted alumnus of the college": (Note: Joseph Hodges Choate, presiding at the dinner, "referred to the giver as 'a pious worshipper at Harvard's shrine, turning his face towards Mecca;' and, when the letter was read, the applause of the company compelled Mr. Bridge to make a silent acknowledgement".^{[M]})

To the President and Fellows of Harvard College.
Gentlemen, — I have the pleasure of offering you an ideal statue in bronze, representing your founder, the Rev. John Harvard, to be designed by Daniel C. French of Concord ... I am assured that the same can be in place by June 1, 1884.^{[M]}

Bridge specified an "ideal" statue because there was then (as now) nothing to indicate what John Harvard had looked like; thus when French began work in September he used Harvard student Sherman Hoar as inspiration for the figure's face. "In looking about for a type of the early comers to our shores," he wrote, "I chose a lineal descendant of them for my model in the general structure of the face. He has more of what I want than anybody I know." (Through his father Ebenezer Rockwood Hoar‍—‌chairman^{[M]} of Harvard's Board of Overseers‍—‌Sherman Hoar was descended from a brother of Harvard's fourth president Leonard Hoar, (Note: Nourse, Henry Stedman (1899). The Hoar Family in America. (See family tree at end of transcription.) "Leonard Hoar, designated in his father's will to be the scholar of the family and a teacher in the church," became in 1672 the first Harvard president to have also been a Harvard graduate. "In Sewall's Diary, June 15, 1674, is an account of the flogging of an undergraduate before the assembled students in the Library, President Hoar prefacing and closing the exercises with prayer. But this was not a very unusual discipline in those days and Dr. Hoar is not charged with undue severity.") as well as from Roger Sherman, a signer of the United States Declaration of Independence and the United States Constitution.)

The commission weighed heavily on French even as the figure neared completion. "I am sometimes scared by the importance of this work. It is a subject that one might not have in a lifetime," wrote the sculptor‍—‌who thirty years later would create the statue of Abraham Lincoln for the Lincoln Memorial‍—‌"and a failure would be inexcusable. As a general thing, my model looks pretty well to me, but there are dark days."

French's final model was ready the following May and realized in bronze by the Henry-Bonnard Bronze Company over the next several months. The cost was reportedly more than $20,000 (equivalent to $700,000 in 2025).

The statue was installed‍—‌"looking wistfully into the western sky", said Harvard president Charles W. Eliot^{[M]}‍—‌at the western end of Memorial Hall on the triangular city block then known as the Delta. At its October 15, 1884 unveiling^{[M]} Ellis gave "a singularly felicitous address, telling the story of the life of John Harvard, who passes so mysteriously across the page of our early history."

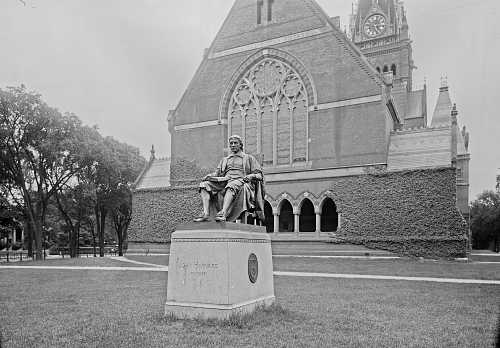
Original site west of Memorial Hall

In 1920 French wrote to Harvard president Abbott Lawrence Lowell desiring that the statue be relocated; in 1924 it was moved from Memorial Hall (then the college dining hall‍—‌a Harvard Lampoon drawing showed John Harvard dismounting his plinth, chair in tow, and holding his nose because he "couldn't stand the smell of 'Mem' any longer") to its current location on the west side of Harvard Yard's University Hall, facing Harvard Hall, Massachusetts Hall, and the Johnston Gate. (Note: Bunting, Bainbridge (1998). Harvard: An Architectural History. Harvard University Press. p. 290, n.14. ISBN 9780674372917: "The transfer of the statue from its original site on the Delta to a position on axis with Charles McKim's Johnston Gate was intended to give a sense of large-scale planning to the Yard and also to ameliorate the awkwardness of the central portion of Bulfinch's facade of University Hall.") Later that year the Lampoon imagined the frustrations of the metallic, immobile John Harvard surrounded by Harvard undergraduates—

Great men arise / Before my eyes / From yonder pile I founded
While I must sit / Quite out of it / My jealousy unbounded

—though twelve years later David McCord portrayed the founder as satisfied in his stationarity:

"Is that you, John Harvard?" / I said to his statue.
"Aye, that's me," said John, / "And after you're gone."

A photograph of the statue appeared on the cover of the May 5, 1941 issue of Life magazine.

Sometime in the 1990s tour guides began encouraging visitors to emulate a "student tradition"‍—‌nonexistent‍—‌of rubbing the toe of John Harvard's left shoe for luck, so that while the statue as a whole is darkly weathered the toe now "gleams almost throbbingly bright, as though from an excruciating inflammation of the bronze." (Note: Though noting that "students do rub bronze body parts [including noses and 'pedal extremeties'] at many schools and colleges", and that Dean of Students Archie Epps confessed to having once "insinuated himself into a group of tourists admiring the statue and whispered, 'I wonder if you'd get good luck if you rubbed his foot'", Harvard Magazine attributed persistence of the Harvard rub-for-luck faux tradition to the "mythmaking" of tour guides, who "assure their flocks that undergraduates have traditionally rubbed John Harvard's foot for luck (before exams or a mixer). They invite the tourists to do the same, and the tourists, being game and having paid their nickel, rub with gusto." In 2021 curators restored the toe's brown patina, but predicted that it would soon be rubbed off again. Based on the estimate of a professor of materials science that "the shoe can endure 10 million rubs before it is utterly consumed", Harvard Magazine concluded that "the situation is grave": if 20,000 visitors per year each contribute "three brisk rubs (conservative estimates, surely), in 166 years John's toes will be history.") It is, however, traditional for seniors, as they process to graduation exercises on Commencement Day, to remove their caps as they pass.

The statue is depicted on the United States Postal Service's 1986 John Harvard stamp (part of its Great Americans series).

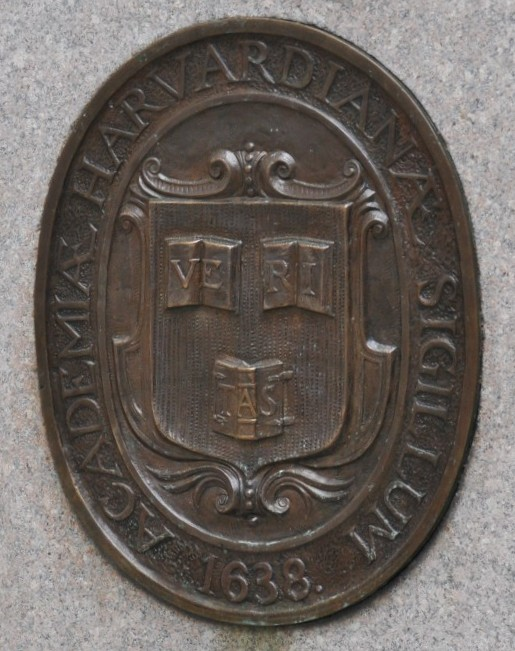
Harvard College
seal (Note: The modern design of the Harvard College seal features the syllables ve • ri • tas ("truth") superimposed on three books opened face up, with their pages to the viewer. The seal on the plinth, however, is an earlier design (the "Quincy seal", itself based on a long-forgotten 17th-century design rediscovered by president Josiah Quincy in the 1830s) in which the third book is opened face down, with the letters tas over cover, spine, cover.)

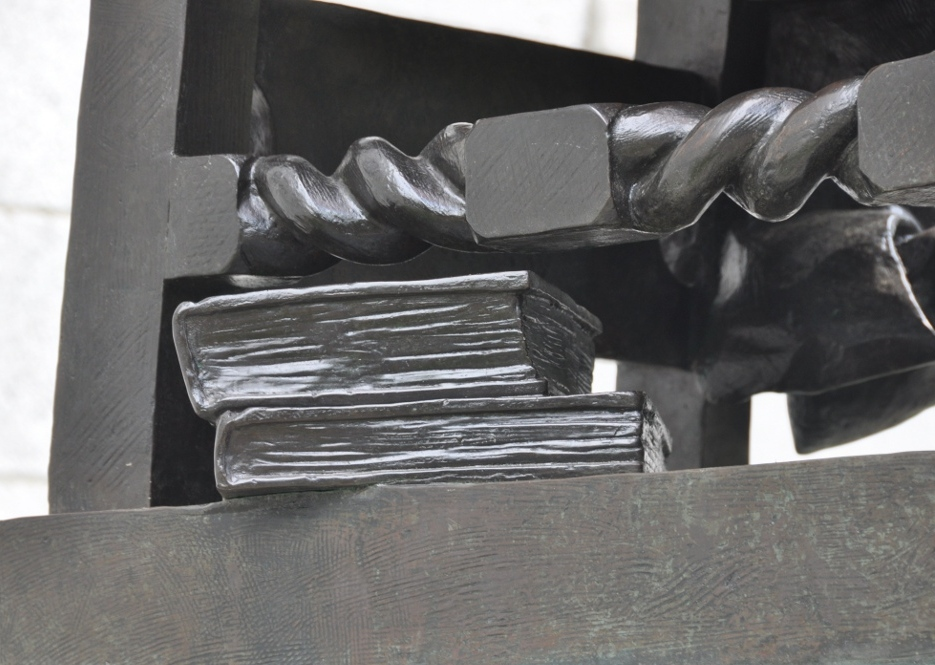
Harvard's gift included his 400-volume scholar's library.

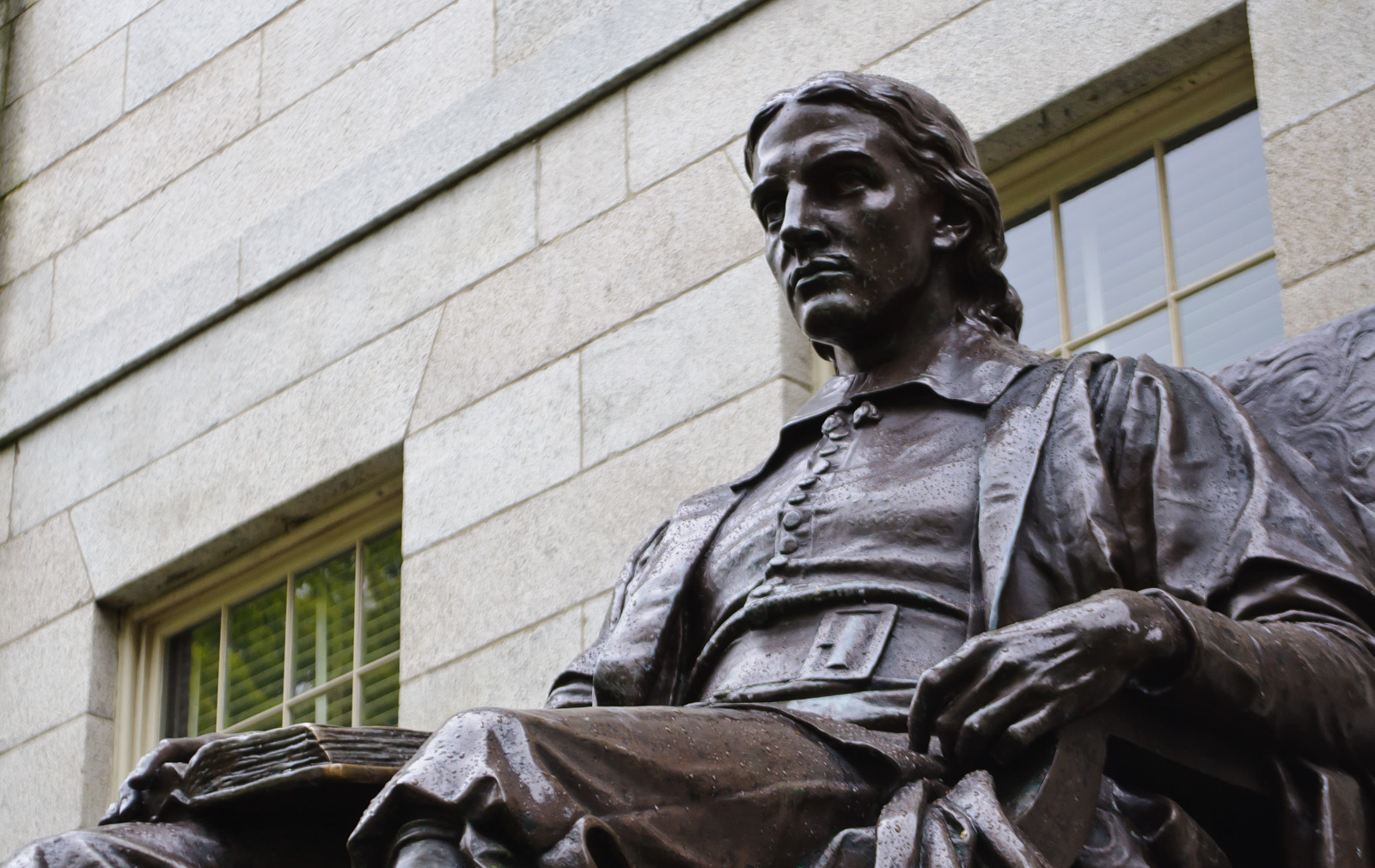

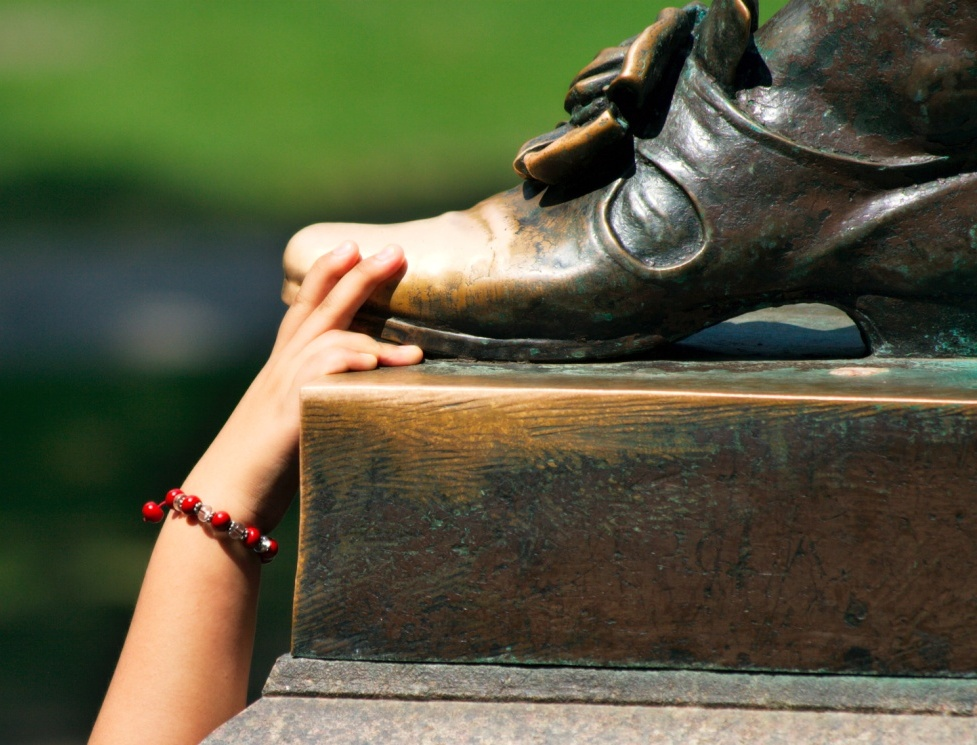
Tourists (if not students) rub John Harvard's toe for luck.

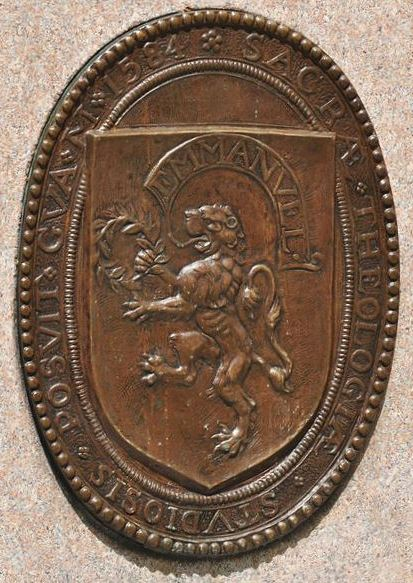
Emmanuel
College seal

== Seals and inscriptions ==
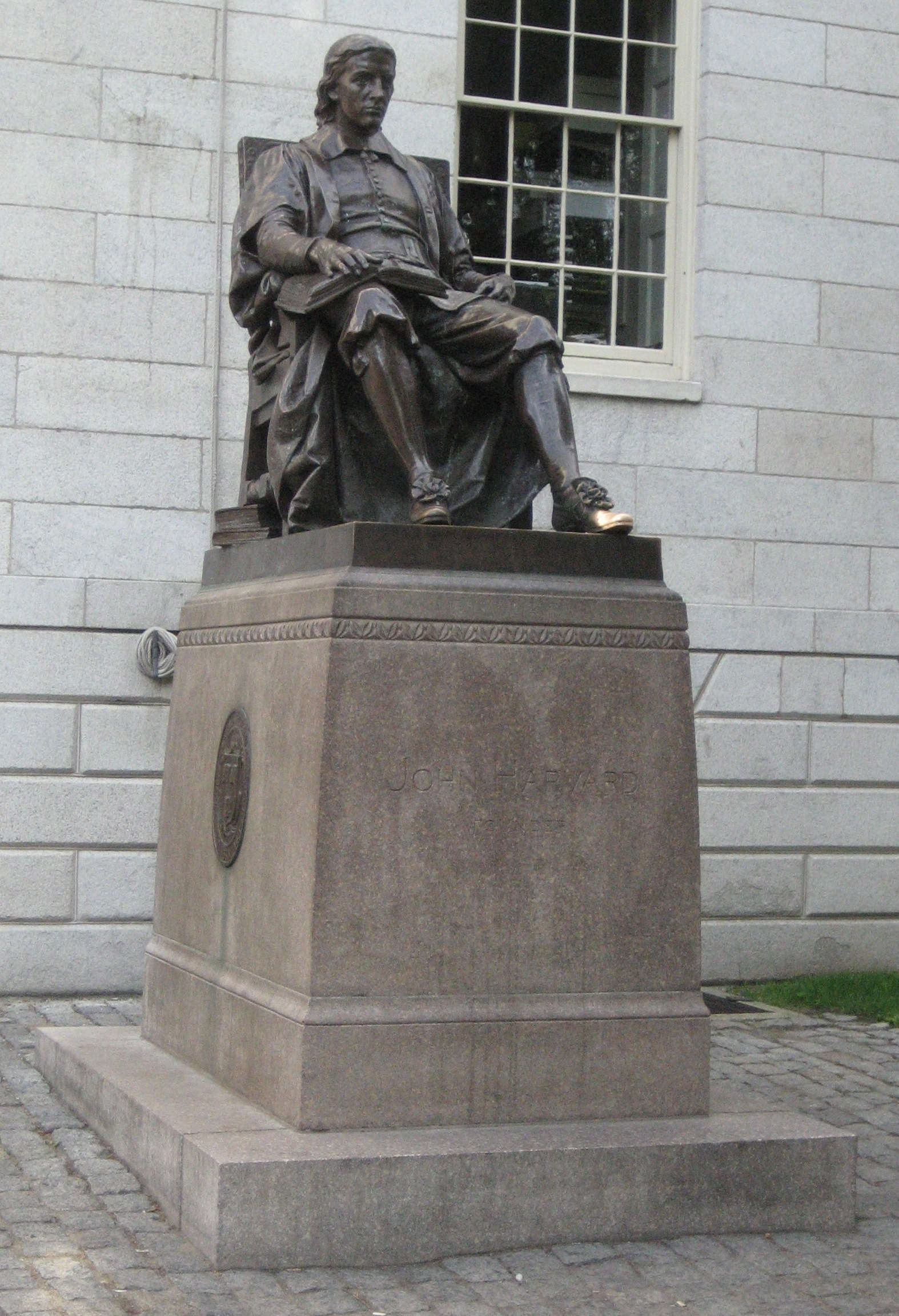
John Harvard guarding the University Hall offices of the Dean of Harvard College (the location calculated, the Harvard Crimson once said, "according to one theory, in order to keep all light out of the Dean's office"). Note Harvard College seal on plinth.

The facts as to John Harvard's relation to the founding of the College ... are entirely compatible with the inscription on John Harvard's statue. There is no myth to be destroyed.

— Jerome Davis Greene (Note: Excerpted from Greene, Jerome Davis (December 11, 1934). "Don't Quibble Sybil — The Mail" (Letter to the editor)". Harvard Crimson. ("Don't quibble, Sybil" is a line from Noël Coward's 1930 Private Lives.) Greene's scold to "the sons of Harvard" opens, "The quibble over the question whether John Harvard was entitled to be called the Founder of Harvard College seems to me one of the least profitable. The destruction of myths is a legitimate sport, but its only justification is the establishment of truth in place of error." Greene was responding to a November 26 Crimson item iconoclastically headlined "Memorial Society Honors Founder of College In the Name and Image of Two Other Men — College Founded By Grant of the Massachusetts General Court in the Year 1636" : "When the members of the Memorial Society place a wreath on the statue of John Harvard today, expecting to honor the memory and the image of the founder of Harvard College, they will be honoring the likeness of another man and the name of a man who was not the legal founder of the college.")

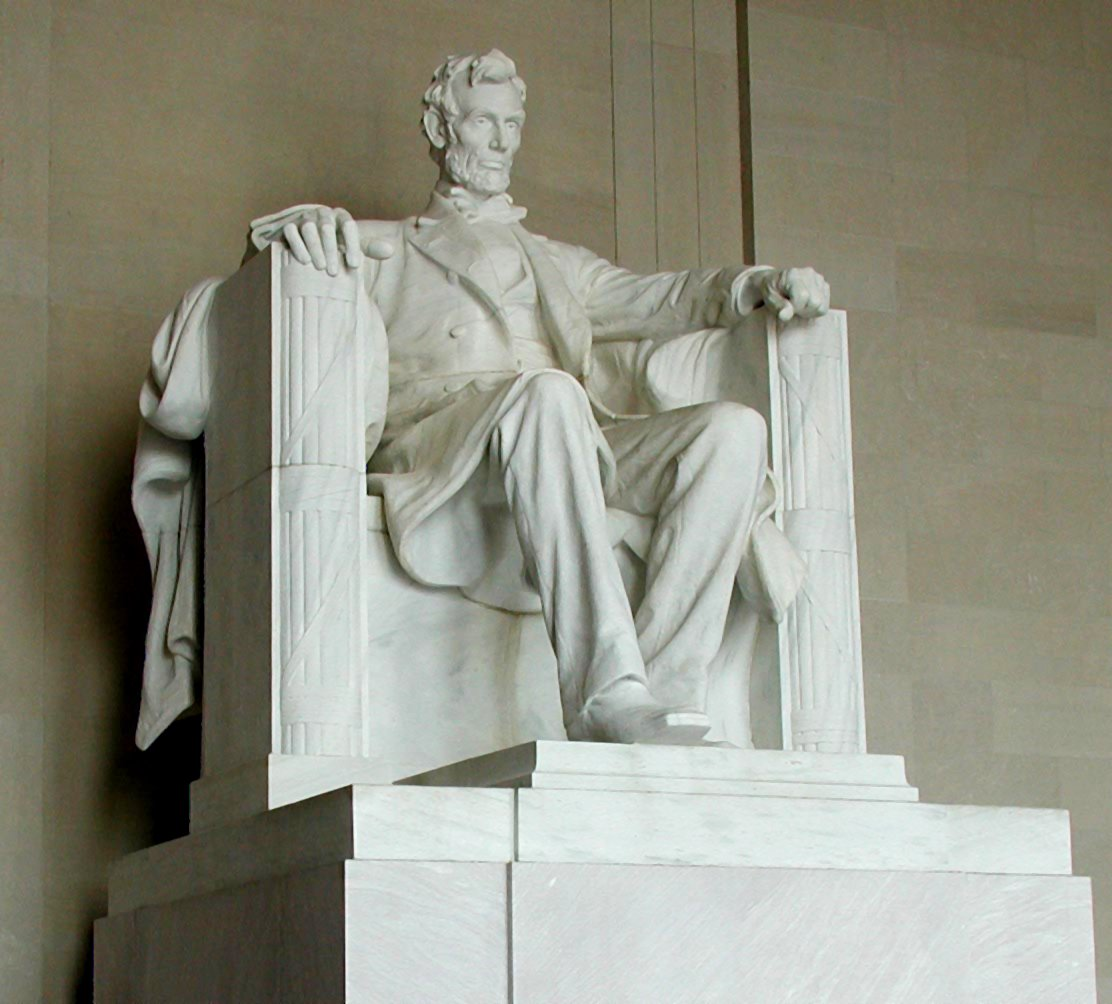
French's 1920 Abraham Lincoln. Laurel Ulrich notes that "statues of great men are not often seated".

The monument's six-foot granite plinth is by Boston architect Charles Howard Walker. On its southern side (the side to the viewer's right), in bronze, is the seal of John Harvard's alma mater, the University of Cambridge's Emmanuel College; on the northern side is what Ellis called "that most felicitously chosen of all like devices, the three open books and the veritas of Harvard. The pupil of the one institution was the founder of the other, transferring learning from its foreign home to this once wilderness scene." On the rear are the words GIVEN BY • SAMUEL JAMES BRIDGE • JUNE 17, 1883. (Note: ^{[M]} Additionally, on either side of the base of the sculpture are THE HENRY-BONNARD BRONZE CO. • NEW YORK 1884 and DANIEL C. FRENCH • 1884.)

The face of the plinth is inscribed (in letters originally gilt)^{[M]} JOHN HARVARD • FOUNDER • 1638‍—‌words "hardly read before some smartass guide breezily informs the unsuspecting visitor that this is, after all, the 'Statue of the Three Lies'" (as Douglas Shand-Tucci put it) because (as is ritually related to freshmen and visitors):

- the statue is not a likeness of JOHN HARVARD;
- it was the Great and General Court of the Massachusetts Bay Colony‍—‌not John Harvard‍—‌which first voted "to give 400£ towards a schoale or Colledge", preempting any claim for John Harvard as FOUNDER; and
- the General Court's vote came in 1636, not in the inscription's 1638‍—‌the latter being merely the year of John Harvard's bequest to the school.

However (Shand-Tucci continues) "the idea of the three lies is at best a fourth, and by far the greater falsehood," as detailed in a 1934 letter to the Harvard Crimson from the secretary of the Harvard Corporation and director of the school's then-upcoming Tercentenary Celebration:

The facts as to John Harvard's relation to the founding of the College are not at all in dispute nor can it be said that the statue in front of University Hall does any violence to them. No likeness of John Harvard having been preserved, the statue [is an "ideal" representation].

If the founding of a university must be dated to a split second of time, then the founding of Harvard should perhaps be fixed by the fall of the president's gavel in announcing the passage of the vote of October 28, 1636 [see History of Harvard University]. But if the founding is to be regarded as a process rather than as a single event [then John Harvard, by virtue of his bequest "at the very threshold of the College's existence and going further than any other contribution made up to that time to ensure its permanence"] is clearly entitled to be considered a founder. The General Court ... acknowledged the fact by bestowing his name on the College.

These are all familiar facts and it is well that they should be understood by the sons of Harvard. They are entirely compatible with the inscription on John Harvard's statue. There is no myth to be destroyed.

== "Idealization" dispute ==
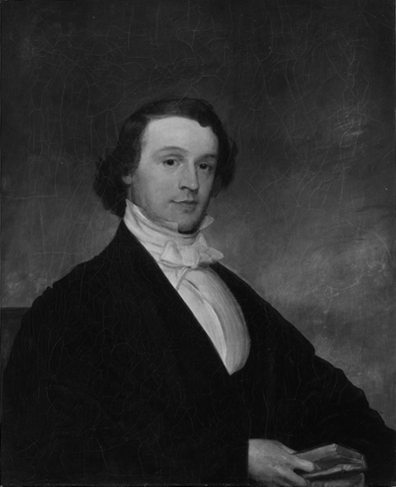
George Edward Ellis

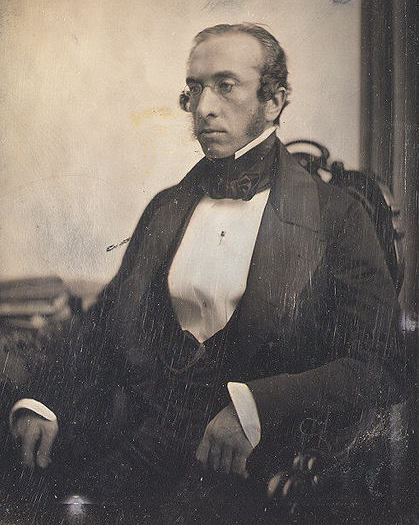
Robert C. Winthrop, c. 1850

The challenge of creating an idealized representation of John Harvard was discussed by Ellis at the October 1883 meeting of the Massachusetts Historical Society:

A very exacting demand is to be made upon the genius and skill of the artist ... The work must be wholly ideal, guided by a few suggestive hints, all of which are in harmony with grace, delicacy, dignity, and reverential regard. There is necessarily much that is unsatisfactory in a wholly idealized representation by art of an historical person of whose form, features, and lineaments there are no certifications. But the few facts [known with certainty] concerning Harvard are certainly helpful to the artist.

But Society president Robert Charles Winthrop harshly disapproved:

It must be altogether a fancy sketch, a 'counterfeit presentment,'‍—‌to use Shakespeare's phrase,‍—‌and in more senses of the word than one ... [S]uch attempts to make portrait statues of those of whom there are not only no portraits, but no records or recollections, are of very doubtful desireableness ... Such a course tends to the confusing and confounding of historic truth and leaves posterity unable to decide what is authentic and what is mere invention ... It seems to me of very questionable expediency to get up a fictitious likeness of him and make up a figure according to our ideas of the man.

A year later, in his oration^{[M]} before the unveiling of what he called "a simulacrum ... a conception of what Harvard might have been in body and lineament, from what we know that he was in mind and in soul", Ellis answered Winthrop's criticism:

This exquisite moulding in bronze serves a purpose for the eye, the thought, and sentiment, through the ideal, in lack of the real ... It is by no means without allowed and approved precedent, that, in the lack of authentic portraitures of such as are to be commemorated, an ideal representation supplies the vacancy of a reality. It is one of the fair issues between poetry and prose.

The wise, the honored, the fair, the noble, and the saintly, are never grudged some finer touches of the artist in tint or feature, which etherialize their beauty, or magnify their elevation, as expressed in the actual body,‍—‌the eye, the brow, the lip, the moulding of the mortal clay. To flatter is not always to falsify.

Should there ever appear, however,

some authentic portraiture of John Harvard, the pledge may here and now be ventured, that some generous friend, such as, to the end, shall never fail our Alma Mater, notwithstanding her chronic poverty, will provide that this bronze shall be liquified again, and made to tell the whole known truth so as by fire.

== Pranks ==
The statue became the target of pranks soon after its unveiling.

=== 1884 tarring ===
In 1884, The Harvard Crimson reported that, "Some ingenious persons covered the John Harvard statue last night with a coat of tar. The same persons presumably, marked a large '87 on the wall at the entrance of the chapel," and in 1886 the Crimson mentions a further incident: "A graduate contributor to the Advocate suggests that the editors of the college papers ferret out the authors of the small disturbances, such as the painting of the John Harvard statue."

=== 1890 painting ===
Following a May 31, 1890 Harvard athletic victory, front-page headlines in the Boston Morning Globe declared: "Vandalism at Harvard; statue of John Harvard and college buildings daubed with red paint by drunken students; seniors and faculty indignant ... Riotous Mob Ruled the Campus."

The next day the Globe further reported that a Harvard student observing graffiti-removal efforts "declared that no Harvard man ever daubed the impious phrase, 'To h—l with Yale.' He was of the opinion that a Harvard man would at least soften the profanity by varnishing it with Latin or Greek ... Two detectives who were requested to ferret out the perpetrators paid little heed to the discussion on swear words, but kept their eyes on several impressions that had been made on the paint when it was fresh. One thought they were made by a dog's paws, and as several students kept dogs the suspicion was magnified to the importance of a clue. A student, however, told the detectives that according to his view the impressions were made by barefoot boys walking on tip-toe." (Note: Boston Morning Globe, p. 1, June 3, 1890)

Out-of-state newspapers reporting the outrage, and to a greater or lesser degree following the subsequent investigation, included (among many others):

- The World (New York, New York; June 2, p. 2): "A Jocular Outrage — Harvard Students Exceed Decency in Celebrating."
- Evening Gazette (Sterling, Illinois; June 2, p. 4): "Harvard Students on an Outrageous Tear. — Slathers of Red Paint Used. — The Fine Statue of the College Founder Ruined by the Crazy Scapegraces."
- Fort Wayne Sentinel (Fort Wayne, Indiana; June 2, p. 5): "The faculty will expel the criminals and persecute [sic] them if found."
- The Philadelphia Record: "Painted Harvard Red — Disgraceful Antics of Rum-Crazed Students. — Cambridge is Horrified. — The Faculty Bent on Vengeance ... Last night the whole college celebrated a wild orgie [sic] ... There were suppers, bonfires, fish-horns and a general pandemonium; but, save the insane acts of two of the students, who, overcome with enthusiasm, deliberately threw their dress coats into the bonfire while dancing around the blaze, no great overt act was then committed ... It was during the small hours that the vandals were abroad ... [John Harvard's] face, hands, books, and shoes were bright crimson, and his clothes striped like a zebra."

Despite a mass meeting of outraged Harvard men (who insisted the culprits must be outsideers or, failing that, freshmen), the hiring of detectives, and an apparently facetious report that Harvard President Charles W. Eliot was unavailable for comment because he had "gone out in the woods to cut switches" (all Globe, June 3), on June 22 an anonymous contributor (Globe, p. 20) intimated that while "the faculty claim that they have not found out any of the men who did the 'fine art' work ... I saw the ringleader on class day showing two very pretty girls around the 'yard'."

=== Other incidents ===
In March 1934 Harvard athletes were suspected in the disappearance of Yale's "ugly bulldog mascot", Handsome Dan. The dog was recovered a few days later, though not before the Harvard Lampoon had photographed him licking John Harvard's boots, which had been smeared with hamburger. ("Dog licks man", a Crimson headline read.)

"Some years ago some students painted [the statue] crimson and our cops caught them red-handed", Deputy Chief of the Harvard University Police Jack W. Morse told The Harvard Crimson in 1984, adding "I've been waiting a long time to use that." (Crimson is Harvard's school color.)

As the statue's hundredth anniversary approached in 1984, Harvard Lampoon president Conan O'Brien predicted that "we'll probably stuff it with cottage cheese, maybe also with some chives."

"I think it’s creative but I wish students would direct their creative energies elsewhere," a Harvard maintenance official said after another incident in 2002.

== See also ==
- Public sculptures by Daniel Chester French
- Statue of John Bridge
