= Rufus Ellis =

American Unitarian minister (1819–1885)

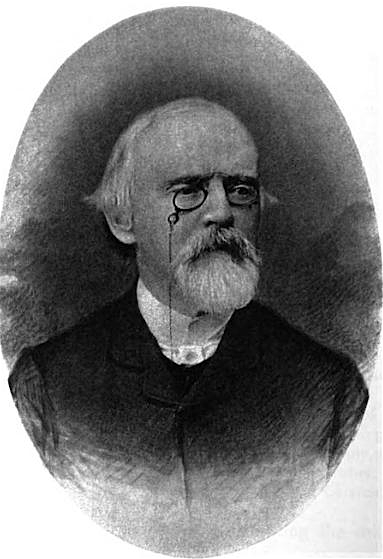
Rufus Ellis

Rufus Ellis (September 14, 1819, in Boston – September 23, 1885) was an American Unitarian minister. His brother, George Edward Ellis, was also a Unitarian minister.

Rufus Ellis graduated at the head of his class from Harvard College in 1838 and then entered the Harvard Divinity School. He was the first regular minister at the First Unitarian Church of Rochester in Rochester, New York, where he led the drive to construct a building for the young congregation in 1843. He served as minister of the Unitarian Church of Northampton in Northampton, Massachusetts from 1843 to 1853. From 1853 until his death in 1885, he was the minister of the First Church in Boston, which was established by the original Puritan settlement in the year that Boston was founded.

Ellis was a lecturer at Harvard Divinity School in 1869 and 1870. For several years he was associate editor of the Religious Monthly Magazine. Many of his sermons and other articles were published in a volume commemorating the 250th anniversary of the First Church.
