= Grace A. Oliver =

American author and women's rights advocate (1844–1899)

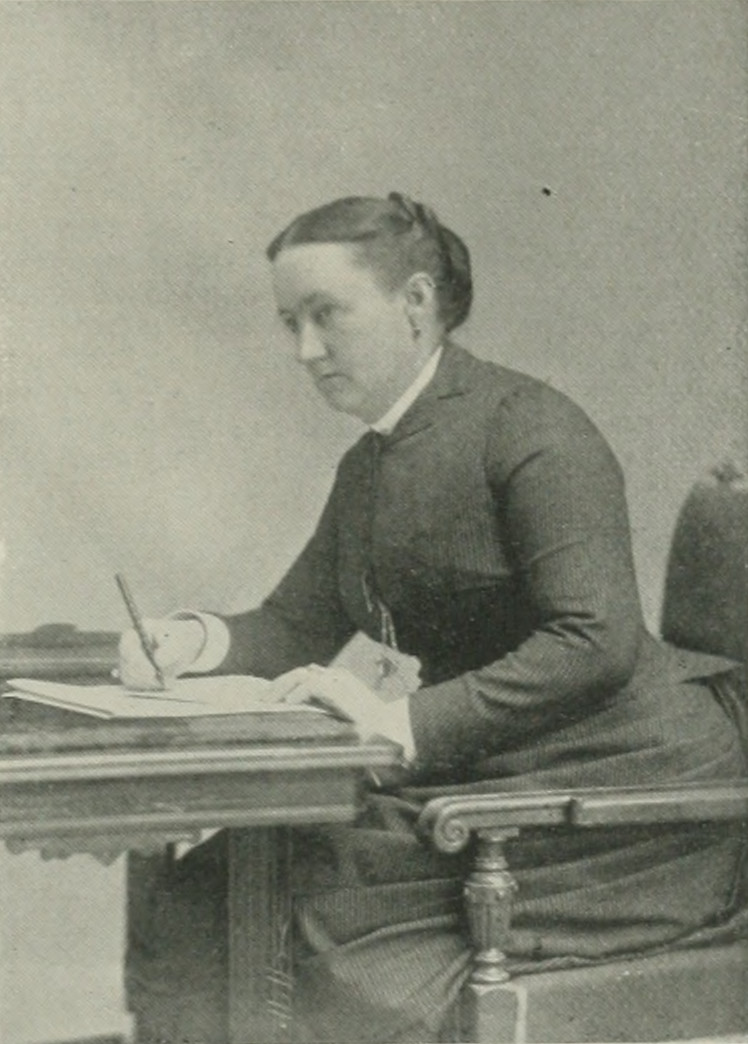
- "A Woman of the Century"
- Born: Grace Atkinson Little; September 24, 1844; Boston, Massachusetts, U.S.
- Died: May 21, 1899 (aged 54); Marblehead, Massachusetts, U.S.
- Occupations: author; litterateur; women's rights advocate
- Spouse: John Harvard Ellis (m. 1869; died 1870) Joseph Pearson Oliver (m. 1879)

Grace A. Oliver (née, Little; after first marriage, Ellis; after second marriage, Oliver; September 24, 1844 – May 21, 1899) was a 19th-century American author, litterateur, and advocate for women's rights. She was characterized as a woman of rare executive ability, a good speaker, and was noted for her charity work.

She contributed to Old and New, wrote editorial articles for the Boston Daily Advertiser, and book notices for various papers. She contributed, under the signature of her deceased husband, John Harvard Ellis, to The Galaxy, the Atlantic Monthly, and Scribner's Monthly. Biographical sketches of Dora d'Istria and other persons were very favorably received. In 1879, she married secondly, Dr. Joseph Pearson Oliver. She published in book form Life and Works of Anna Laetitia Barbauld (Boston, 1873); Life of Maria Edgeworth (1882), written with the aid of family papers and personal reminiscences that were afforded her by members of Miss Edgeworth's family when Oliver visited England in 1874; Memoirs of Ann and Jane Taylor, with Selections from their Works (1883); and Arthur Penrhyn Stanley his Life, Work, and Teachings (1885). She contributed to the Browning Concordance, edited by Dr. William James Rolfe.

== Early life and education ==
Grace Atkinson Little was born in Boston, Massachusetts, September 24, 1844. Her parents were James Lorell and Julia Augusta (Cook) Little. Her father was a prominent merchant of Boston, and had been an agent and treasurer of the Pacific Mills in Lawrence, Massachusetts. He was a descendant of Peregrine White of the Mayflower. Oliver had five brothers, James, John, Arthur, William, and Philip, and no sisters.

She was educated in the private schools of Boston.

== Career ==
In 1869, she married John Harvard Ellis (1841-1870), a lawyer, the son of Rev. Dr. George Edward Ellis, of Boston. John died in 1870, and in 1871, in order to divert her mind, she began to write for the press under his name. The Rev. Dr. Edward Everett Hale advised her to write for his magazine, Old and New (previously known as Christian Examiner), which was her first literary work. From time to time, she contributed to the Atlantic Monthly, The Galaxy, and Scribner's Magazine. She was for some years a regular contributor to the Boston Transcript on book notices, and she wrote also for the Boston Daily Advertiser.

In 1873, she wrote the Life of Mrs. Barbauld, which was well received by the public. In 1874, Mrs. Ellis spent a season in London, England, where she enjoyed the best literary society of that metropolis. While in England, she met some members of the family of Maria Edgeworth. They suggested to her the writing of the life of Edgeworth. That book was published in the Old Corner Bookstore, in Boston, in 1882.

In 1879, she married Dr. Joseph Pearson Oliver (1845-1903), a physician of Boston. Subsequently, she wrote a memoir of the Rev. Arthur Penrhyn Stanley, which book was brought out in Boston and London. In the winter of 1883–84, she edited three volumes of selections from Ann and Jane Taylor, Mrs. Barbauld and Miss Edgeworth.

Oliver engaged in research regarding the lives and reminiscences of some Colonial American women, and also upon the Browning Concordance, edited by Dr. J. W. Rolfe.

She was a state trustee of the Danvers Lunatic Asylum (now, Danvers State Hospital); president of the Salem Society for the Higher Education of Women; president of the Visiting Nurse Association of Marblehead; founder, vice-president, and president of the Thought and Work club of Salem; a member of the New England Women's Club; of the North Shore club of Lynn, Massachusetts, of the Essex Institute, Salem, and an associate member of the New England Woman's Press Association. Oliver and two of her brothers, Capt. Philip and Alderman David Little, were members of the Salem school board, representing Ward 3; it was the first time in the history of the city that the entire representation from any ward was composed of members of one family. She had been on the school board for the last three years of her life.

== Personal life and death ==
Oliver lived in Boston until 1890. The year before, after the death of her father, Oliver bought and fitted up a house in Salem, Massachusetts where she moved in the last month of the year. In that place had lived in the time of the American Revolution her great-grandfather, Col. David Mason, who figured in "Leslie's Retreat," at the North Bridge, in February, 1775. Colonel Mason was, it was said, a correspondent of Dr. Benjamin Franklin, and gave in Salem, as early as 1774, the first advertised public lecture on the subject of electricity.

In 1890, Oliver bought a small piece of land on Doliver's Cove, the earliest settled part of the historic town of Marblehead, Massachusetts. The old wharf, known as Valpey's, she raised and made into a terrace with stone walls. This spot became her summer home.

Oliver died at Marblehead, May 21, 1899. Her papers are held by the University of Notre Dame.

== Selected works ==
- The Story of the Life of Anna Laetitia Barbauld With many of her letters (Boston, 1873)
- A memoir of Mrs. Anna Laetitia Barbauld (1874)
- A study of Maria Edgeworth, with notices of her father and friends (1882)
- Memoirs of Ann and Jane Taylor, with Selections from their Works (1883)
- Classic tales (with Maria Edgeworth, 1883)
- Tales, essays and poems (with Jane Taylor, 1884)
- Arthur Penrhyn Stanley; his life, work and teachings (1885)
- Story of Theodore Parker (with Frances E Cooke, 1889)
