= John Harvard Library =

Public lending library on Borough High Street in Southwark, London

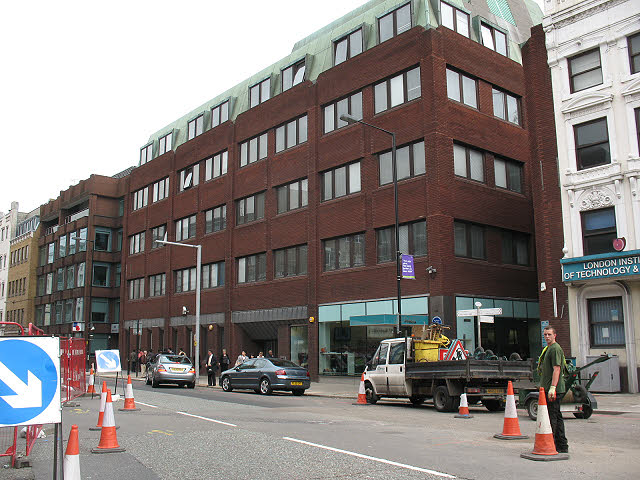
- 51°30′6.59″N 0°5′32″W
- Location: London, United Kingdom
- Type: Public library

Other information
- Parent organisation: Southwark Council
- Public transit access: Borough tube station
- Website: www.southwark.gov.uk/libraries/find-a-library?chapter=9

John Harvard Library is a public lending library on Borough High Street in Southwark, London. The library is home to the Local History Library, as well as a Mouse Tail Coffee Stories cafe.

== Namesake ==
The library bears the name of Southwark clergyman John Harvard (1607–1638), who emigrated to Massachusetts and bequeathed most of his estate, including hundreds of books, to the college now known as Harvard University.

== Description ==
Library membership is open to members of the public, regardless of whether they live in Southwark. Library membership allows patrons access to free Wi-Fi, and there are 24 computers with Internet access, all of which are available for public use. There are 38 adult study spaces, and facilities are handicap-accessible. In addition to offering many programs and services for both adults and children, the library hosts discussion groups and free computer classes. Its collection includes books, audiobooks, CDs, DVDs, Blu-Ray discs, and PlayStation 3 games.

In early 2010, John Harvard Library added radio-frequency identification (RFID) technology to its entire collection of more than 30,000 circulating materials, giving patrons the option of checking items out themselves without consulting the circulation desk.
