= John Harvard =

English clergyman and philanthropist (1607–1638)

The Reverend John Harvard
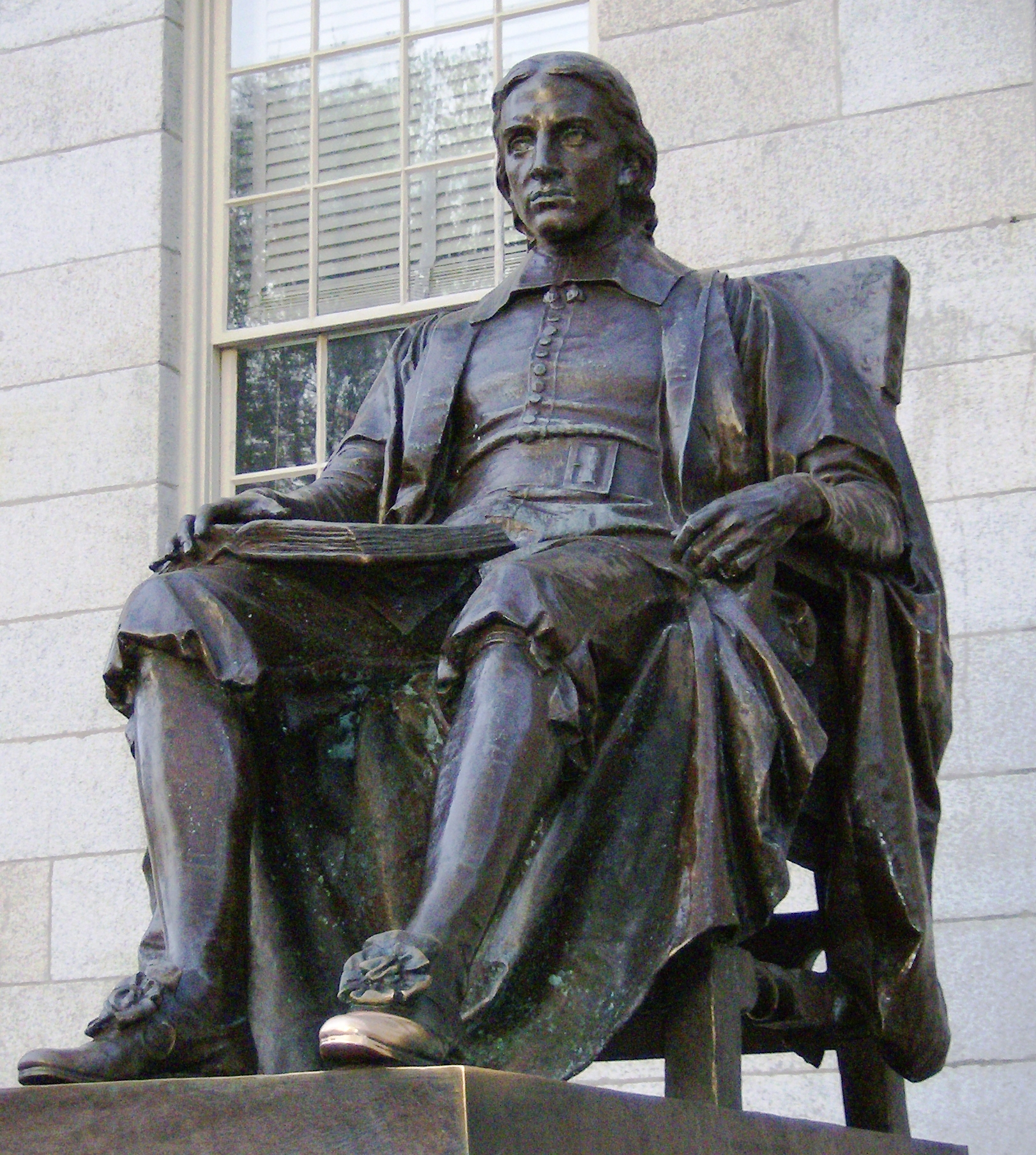
- The John Harvard statue (1884) at Harvard University
- Born: Southwark, Surrey, England
- Baptised: 29 November 1607
- Died: 14 September 1638 (aged 30); Charlestown, Massachusetts Bay Colony, English America
- Cause of death: Tuberculosis
- Education: Emmanuel College, Cambridge (BA, MA)
- Occupation: Pastor
- Known for: A founder of Harvard College
- Spouse: Ann Sadler
- Children: None

Signature
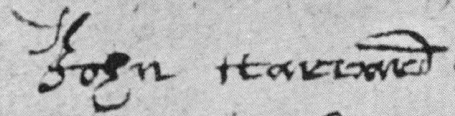

John Harvard (1607–1638) was an English Puritan minister in colonial New England whose deathbed bequest to the "schoale or colledge" founded two years earlier by the Massachusetts Bay Colony was so gratefully received that the colony consequently ordered "that the Colledge agreed upon formerly to be built at Cambridge shalbee called Harvard Colledge".

Harvard was born in Southwark, England, and earned bachelor's and master's degrees from Emmanuel College, Cambridge. In 1637 he emigrated to the Massachusetts Bay Colony – one of the Thirteen Colonies of British America – where he became a teaching elder and assistant preacher of the First Church in Charlestown.

Harvard died of tuberculosis in 1638, leaving a large sum of money and his 400-volume scholar's library to the colony's new school, which the colony then voted to name in his honor. Harvard University considers him the most honored of its founders—those whose efforts and contributions in its early days "ensure[d] its permanence"—and a statue in his honor is a prominent feature of Harvard Yard.

== Life ==
=== Early life and education ===
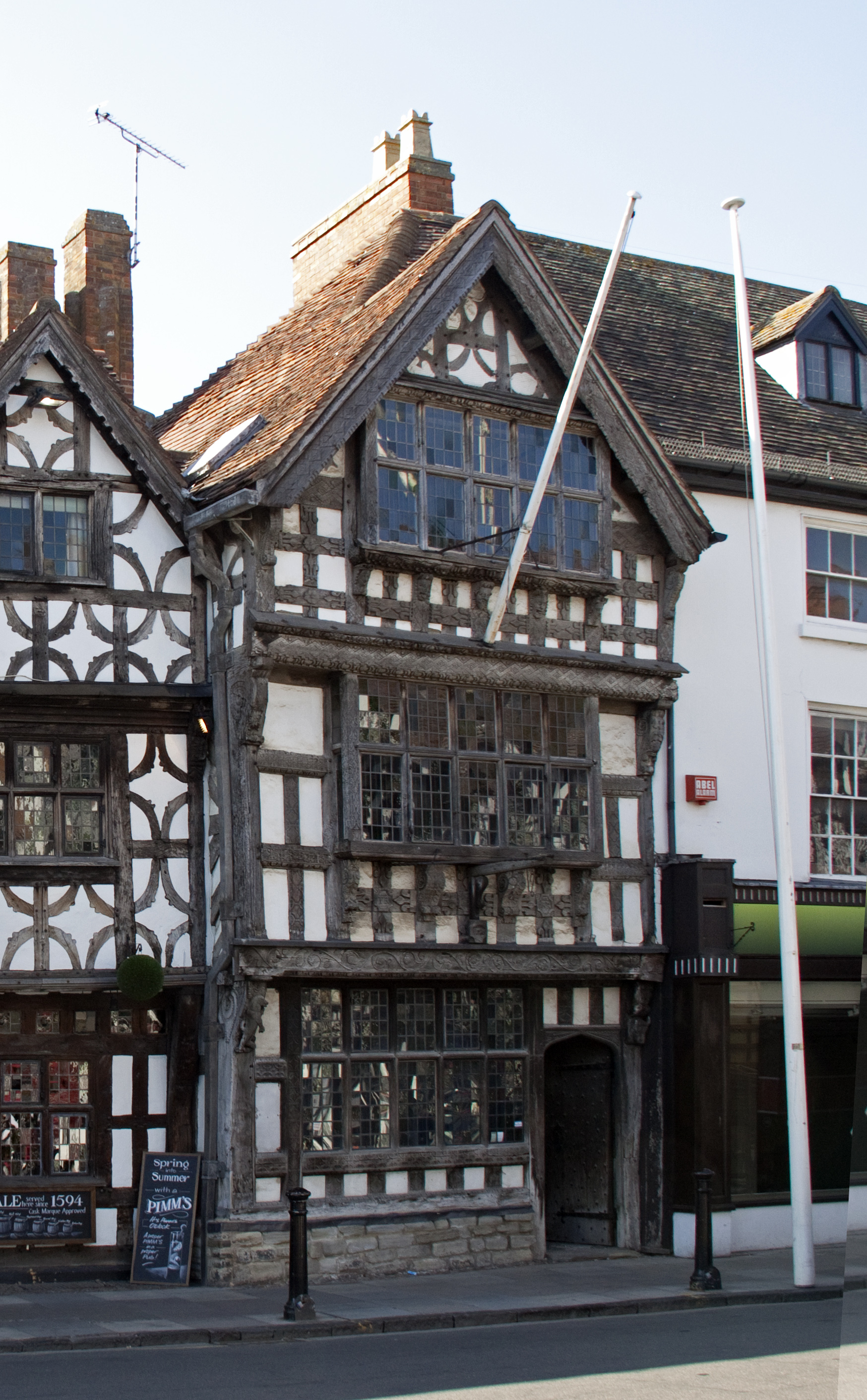
Harvard House in Stratford-upon-Avon, the childhood home of John Harvard's mother Katherine Rogers

Harvard was born and raised in Southwark, Surrey, England, (now a district of the London Borough of Southwark), the fourth of nine children of Robert Harvard (1562–1625), a butcher and tavern owner, and Katherine Rogers (1584–1635), a native of Stratford-upon-Avon. Her father, Thomas Rogers (1540–1611), served on the borough corporation's council with John Shakespeare. Harvard was baptised 29 November 1607 in St Saviour's Church (later Southwark Cathedral) and attended St Saviour's Grammar School, where his father was a member of the governing body and a warden of the parish church. His grandparents' house in Stratford-upon-Avon, largely rebuilt after a fire of 1595, survives as 'Harvard House'.

In 1625, bubonic plague reduced the immediate family to only John, his brother Thomas, and Katherine. Katherine was soon remarried‍—‌firstly in 1626 to John Elletson (1580–1626), who died within a few months, then (1627) to Richard Yearwood (1580–1632). She died in 1635, Thomas in 1637.

Left with some property, Harvard's mother was able to send him to the University of Cambridge, He was admitted as a pensioner to Emmanuel College, Cambridge, on 19 December 1627; he was awarded his B.A. in 1632 and M.A. in 1635.

=== Marriage and emigration to New England ===
On 19 April of either 1636 or 1637, Harvard married Ann Sadler (1614–55) of Patcham in East Sussex, sister of his college contemporary John Sadler, at St Michael the Archangel Church, in the parish of South Malling, Lewes.

In the spring or summer of 1637, the couple emigrated to the New England Colonies, where Harvard became a freeman of Massachusetts and, settling in Charlestown, a teaching elder of the First Church there and an assistant preacher, though it is not known whether he was episcopally ordained. In 1638, a tract of land was deeded to him there, and he was appointed that same year to a committee "to consider of some things tending toward a body of laws."

He built his house on Country Road (later Market Street and then Main Street), next to Gravel Lane, a site that is now the John Harvard Mall. His orchard extended up the hill behind his house.

=== Death ===
On 14 September 1638, Harvard died of tuberculosis and was buried at Charlestown's Phipps Street Burying Ground. In 1828, Harvard University alumni erected a granite monument to his memory there, his original stone having disappeared during the American Revolution.

Harvard's widow, Ann, is believed to have married again, to Thomas Allen, Harvard's successor as teacher of the Charlestown church and administrator of Harvard's estate.

== Bequest to college ==
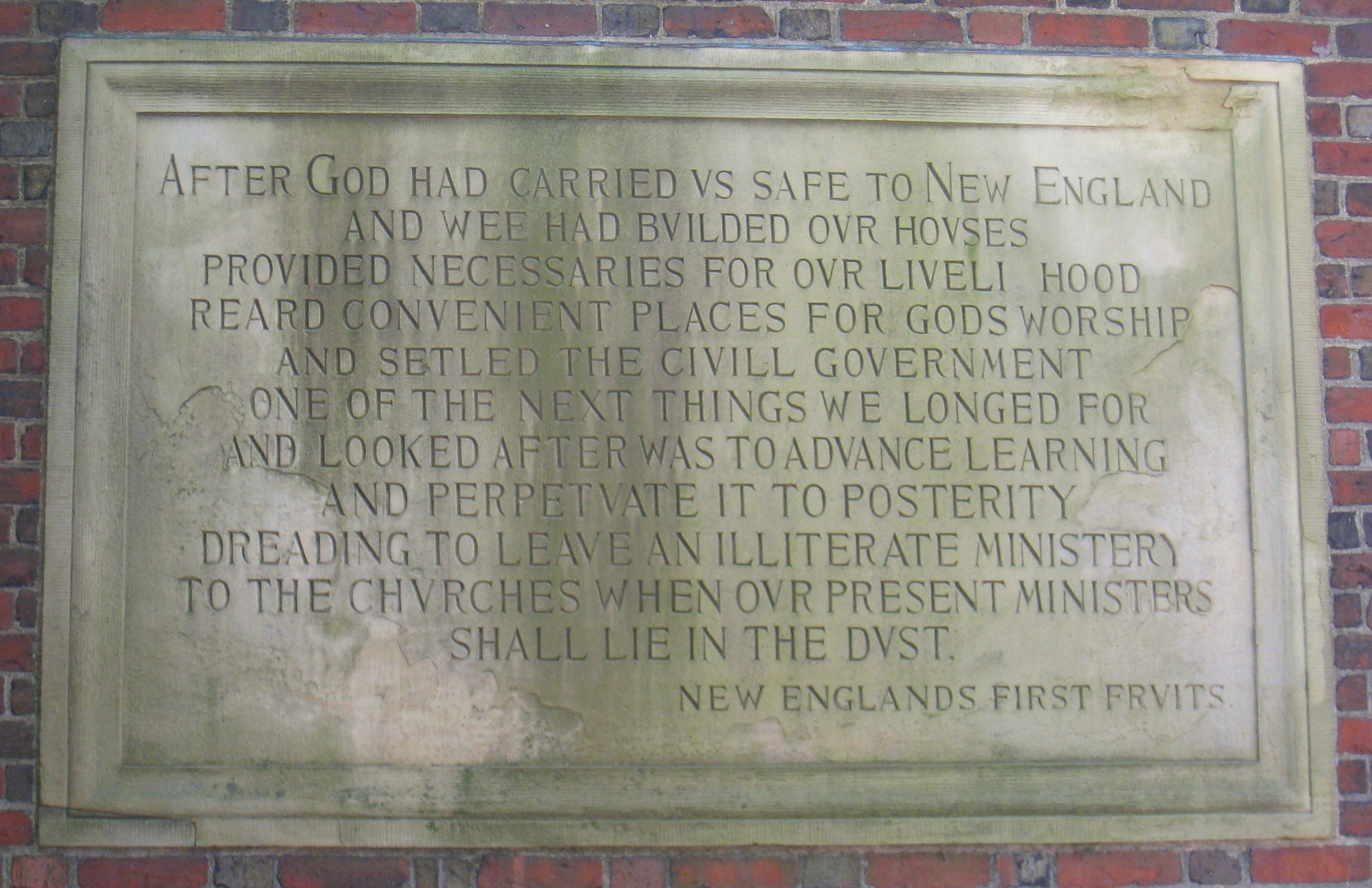
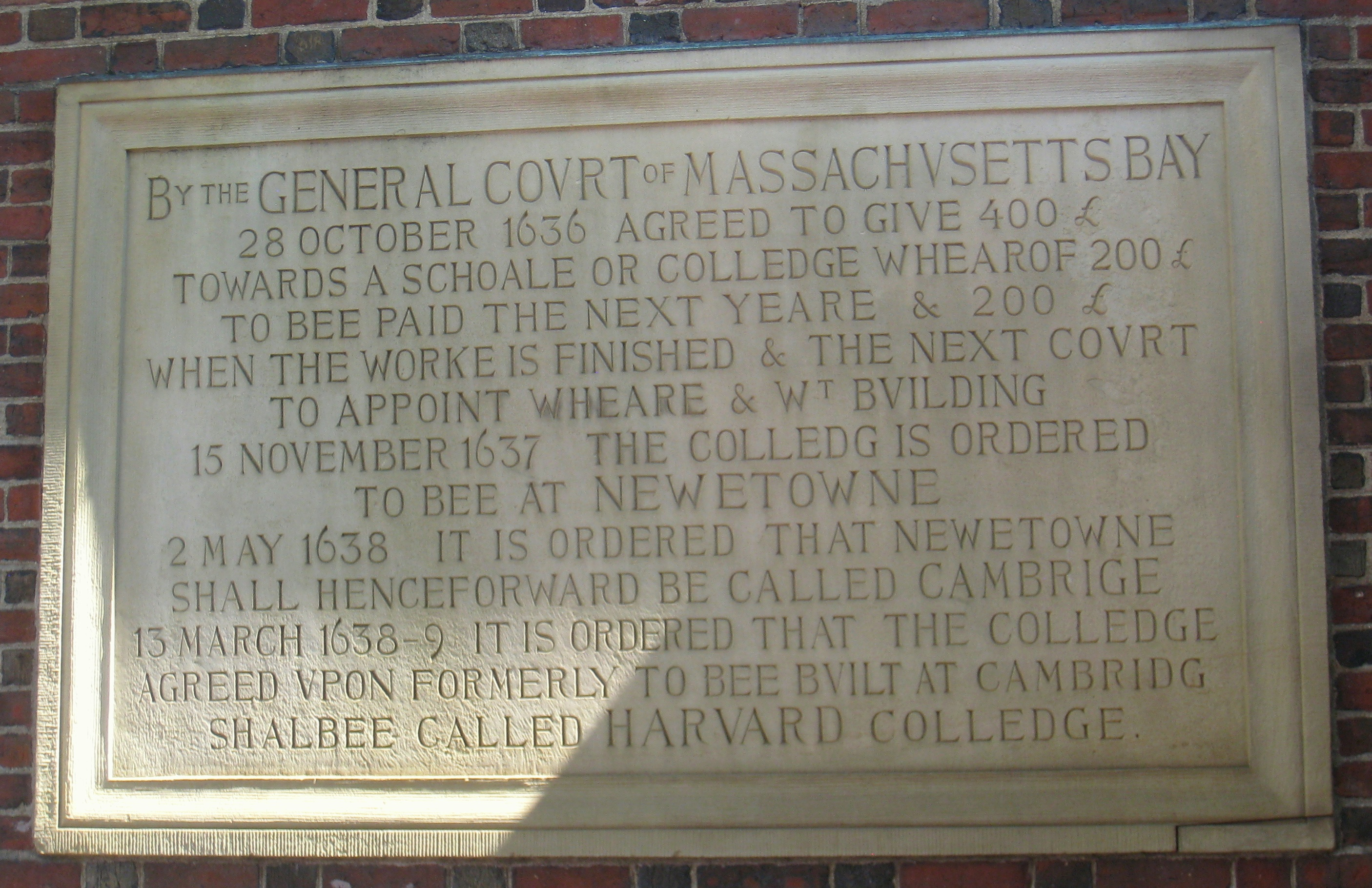
Tablets outside Harvard Yard's Johnston Gate. The tablet on the left (above) quotes from a longer history which continues, "And as we were thinking and consulting how to effect this great work, it pleased God to stir up the heart of one Mr. Harvard (a godly gentleman and a lover of learning, there living among us) to give the one-half of his estate (it being in all about 1700 £) toward the erecting of a college, and all his library. After him, another gave 300 £; others after them cast in more; and the public hand of the state added the rest."

Emmanuel College window (1884) depicting John Harvard on left

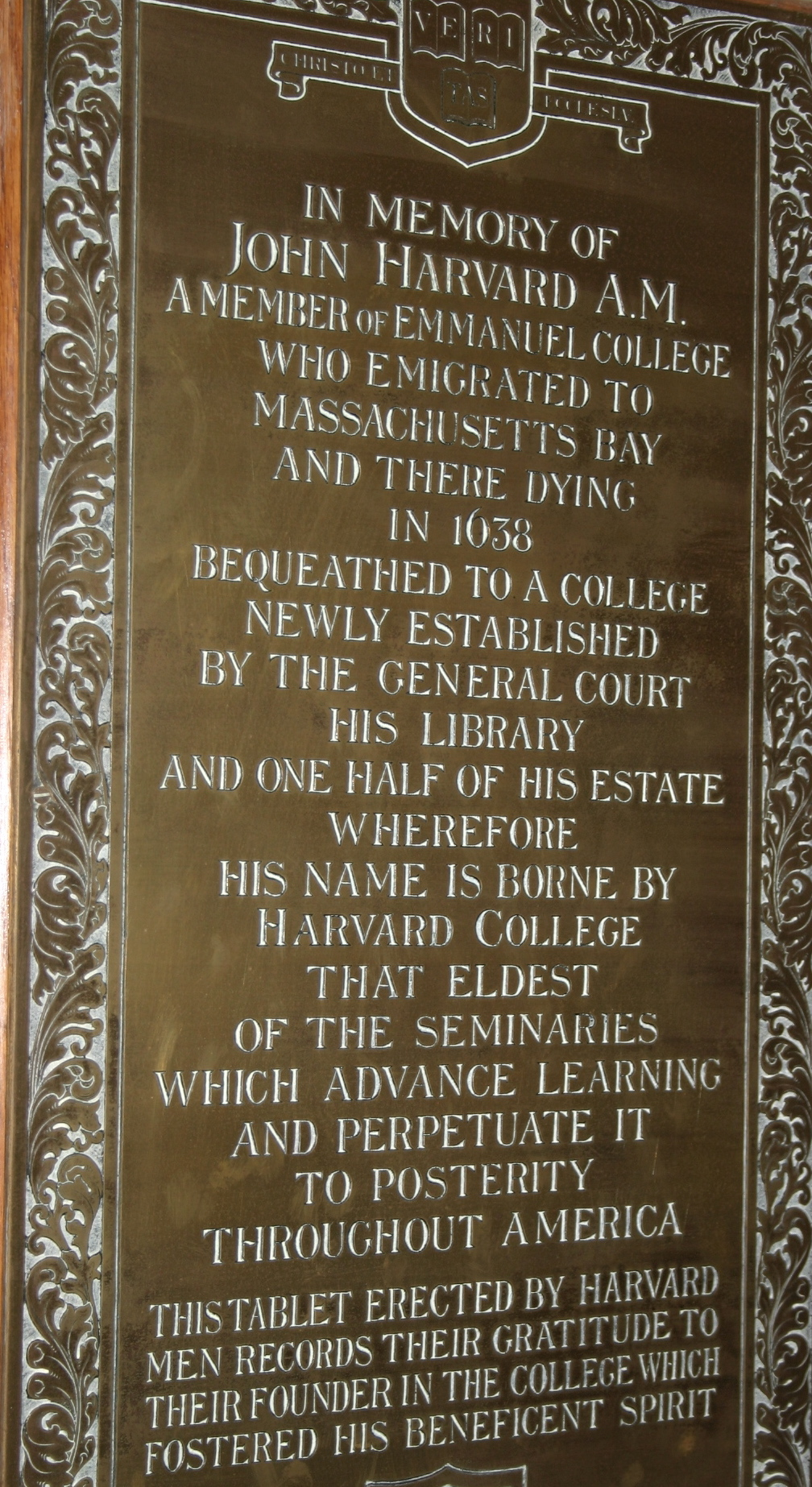
Tablet, Emmanuel College

Two years before Harvard's death the Great and General Court of the Massachusetts Bay Colony‍—‌desiring to "advance learning and perpetuate it to posterity: dreading to leave an illiterate ministry to the churches, when our present ministers shall lie in the dust"‍—‌appropriated £400 toward a "schoale or colledge" at what was then called Newtowne. In an oral will made shortly before his death the childless Harvard, who had inherited considerable sums from his father, mother, and brother, bequeathed to the school £780‍—‌half of his monetary estate‍—‌with the remainder to his wife; this bequest was roughly equal to the Massachusetts Bay Colony's annual tax receipts.

Perhaps more importantly he also gave his scholar's library comprising some 329 titles (totaling 400 volumes, some titles being multivolume works). In gratitude, it was subsequently ordered "that the Colledge agreed upon formerly to bee built at Cambridg shalbee called Harvard Colledge." (Even before Harvard's death, Newtowne had been renamed Cambridge, after the English university attended by many early colonists, including Harvard himself.)

=== Founding "myth" ===
The Harvard College undergraduate newspaper, The Harvard Crimson, as well as what Harvard Magazine calls "smartass" tour guides, commonly assert that John Harvard does not merit the honorific founder, because the Colony's vote creating the institution occurred two years prior to Harvard's bequest. But as detailed in a 1934 letter by Jerome Davis Greene, Secretary of the Harvard Corporation, the founding of Harvard College was not the act of one but the work of many; John Harvard is therefore considered not the founder, but rather a founder, of the school‍—‌though the timeliness and generosity of his contribution have made him the most honored of these:

The quibble over the question whether John Harvard was entitled to be called the Founder of Harvard College seems to me one of the least profitable. The destruction of myths is a legitimate sport, but its only justification is the establishment of truth in place of error.

If the founding of a university must be dated to a split second of time, then the founding of Harvard should perhaps be fixed by the fall of the president's gavel in announcing the passage of the vote of 28 October, 1636. But if the founding is to be regarded as a process rather than as a single event [then John Harvard, by virtue of his bequest "at the very threshold of the College's existence and going further than any other contribution made up to that time to ensure its permanence"] is clearly entitled to be considered a founder. The General Court ... acknowledged the fact by bestowing his name on the College. This was almost two years before the first President took office and four years before the first students were graduated.

These are all familiar facts and it is well that they should be understood by the sons of Harvard. There is no myth to be destroyed.

== Memorials and tributes ==
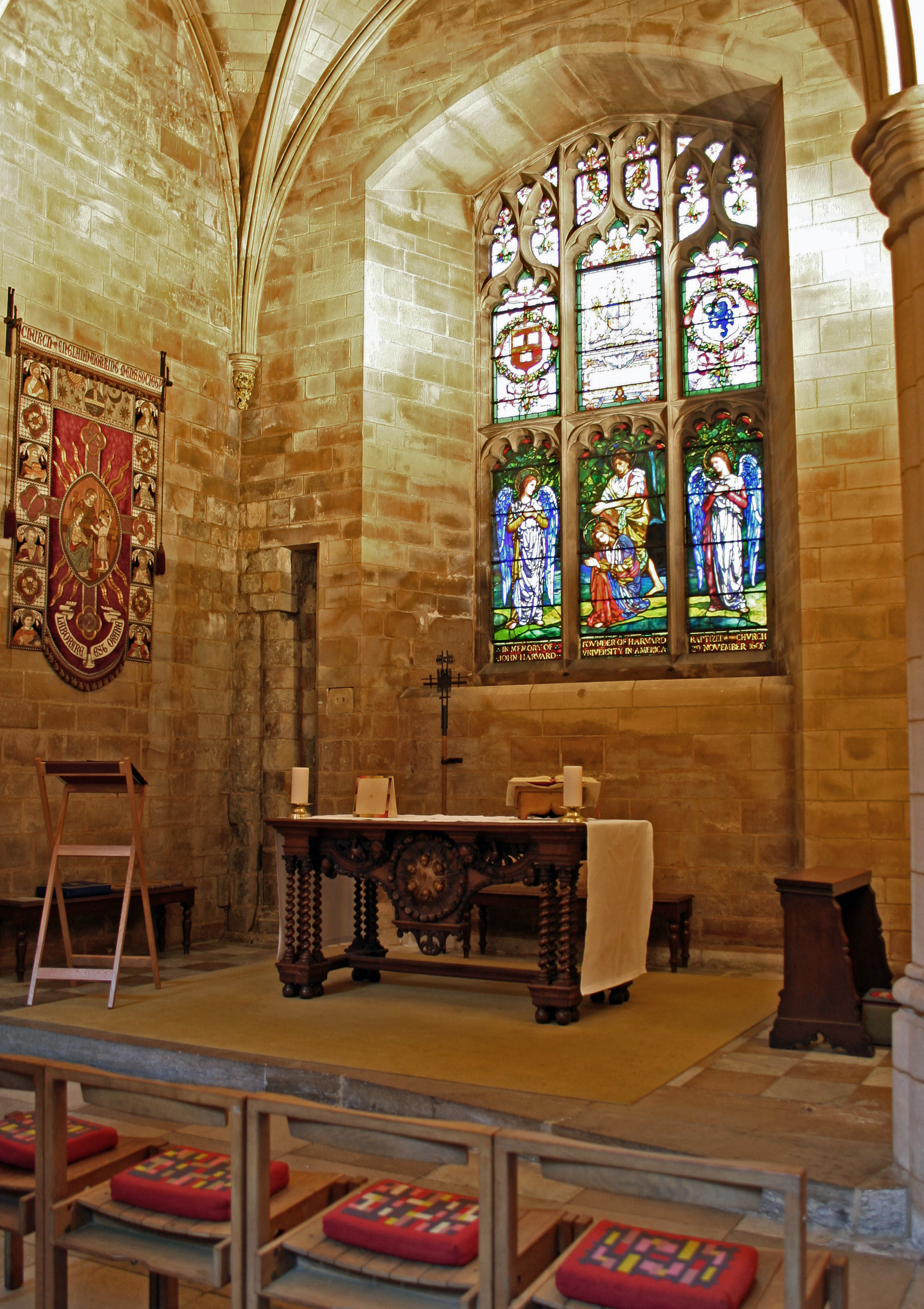
The Harvard Chapel in Southwark Cathedral, London

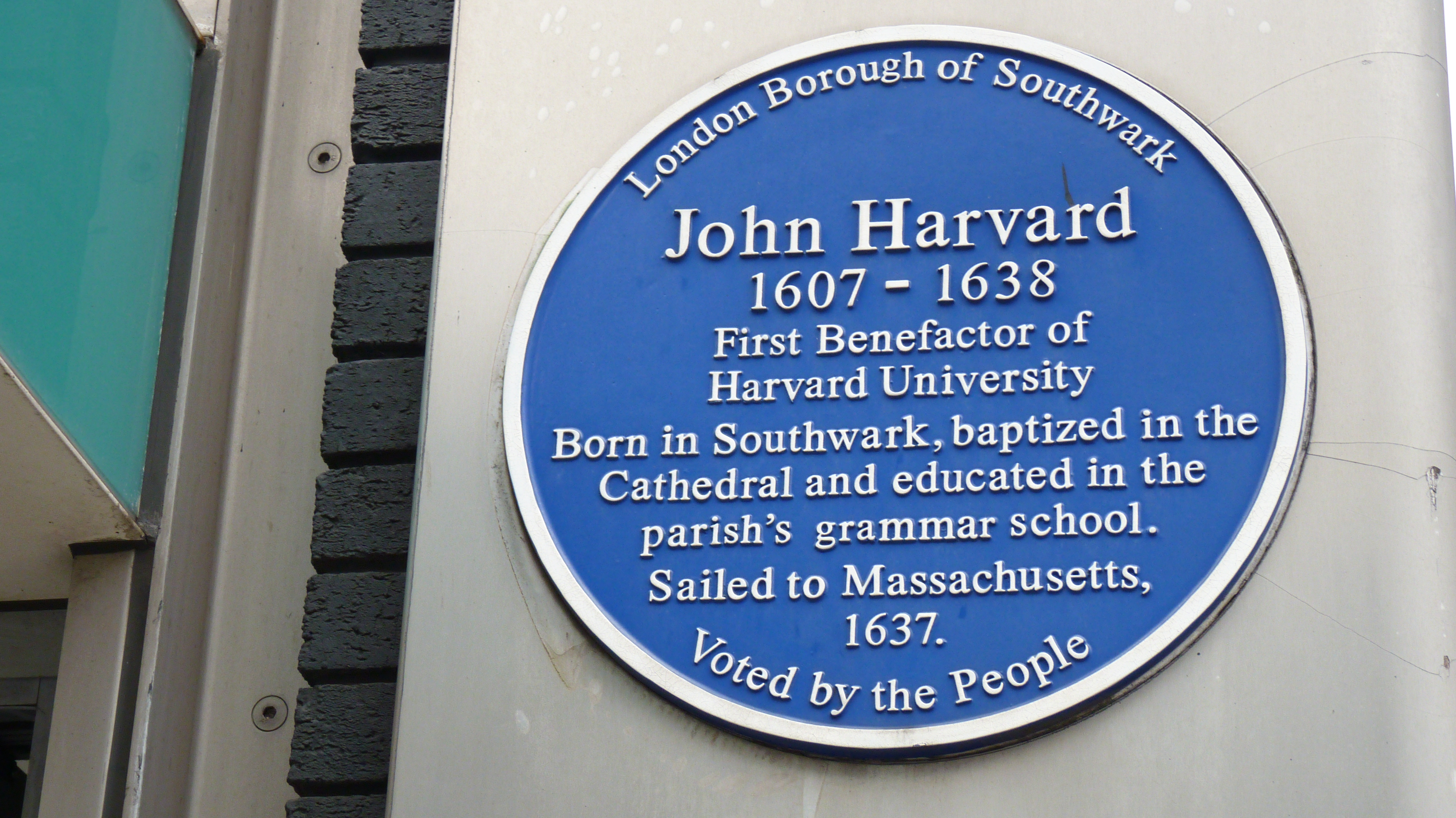
Plaque at 211, Borough High Street, London

A statue in Harvard's honor—not, however, a 'likeness' of him, there being nothing to indicate what he had looked like—is a prominent feature of Harvard Yard (see John Harvard statue) and was featured on a 1986 stamp, part of the United States Postal Service's Great Americans series. A figure representing him also appears in a stained-glass window in the chapel of Emmanuel College, Cambridge.

The John Harvard Library in Southwark, London, is named in Harvard's honor, as is the Harvard Bridge linking Boston and Cambridge, Massachusetts.

In Southwark Cathedral, where Harvard was baptised, the Harvard Chapel in the north transept was rebuilt with donations from Harvard graduates and dedicated in 1907. The stained-glass window was designed by the American artist John La Farge, and given by the American ambassador to the United Kingdom, Joseph Choate.
