= George Edward Ellis =

American historian

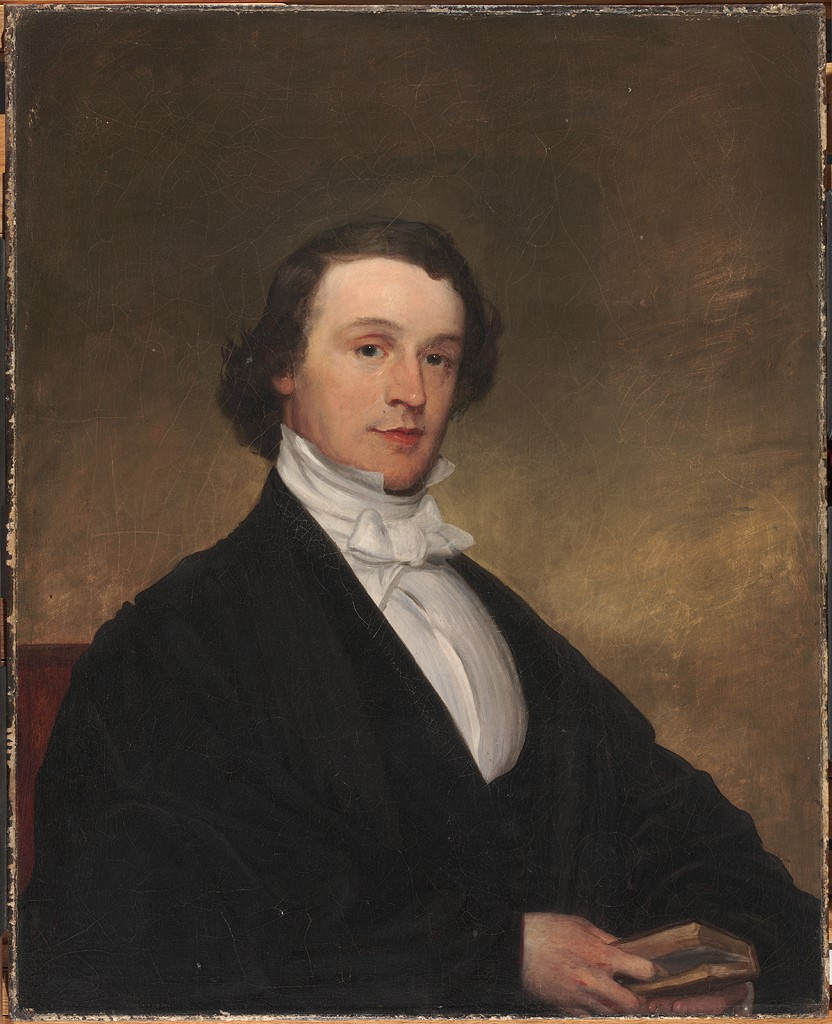
- An 1844 portrait of Ellis by Francis Alexander

George Edward Ellis (August 8, 1814 – December 20, 1894) was a Unitarian clergyman and historian.

== Early life and education ==
Ellis was born in Boston, on August 8, 1814. He graduated from Harvard in 1833, and then from the Divinity School in 1836.

== Career ==
After two years' travel in Europe, he was ordained, on March 11, 1840, as pastor of the Harvard Unitarian Church, in Charlestown, Massachusetts.

From 1857 until 1863, he was a professor of systematic theology in Harvard Divinity School. In 1864, he delivered before the Lowell Institute a course of lectures on the “Evidences of Christianity,” in 1871 a course on the “Provincial History of Massachusetts,” and in 1879 a course on “The Red Man and the White Man in North America” (1882). He resigned the pastorate of Harvard Church on February 22, 1869.

From September 1842 to February 1845, Ellis edited the Christian Register, at first alone and later with George Putnam. From 1849 to 1855, he edited the Christian Examiner.

He was vice president and then president of the Massachusetts Historical Society, and was a member of the Board of Overseers of Harvard in 1850–54, serving for one year as its secretary. Harvard gave him the degree of D.D. in 1857, and that of LL.D. in 1883. Ellis was the fourth person who had received both these degrees from Harvard. He was elected a member of the American Antiquarian Society in 1847, and would later serve as the society's secretary for domestic correspondence from 1890 to 1894.

The author Grace Atkinson Oliver married his son, John Harvard Ellis. He died in Boston in 1894

== Works ==
- Lives of John Mason (1844), Anne Hutchinson (1845), and William Penn (1847), in Spark's “American Biography”
- Half Century of the Unitarian Controversy (Boston, 1857)
- Memoir of Dr. Luther V. Bell (1863)
- The Aims and Purposes of the Founders of Massachusetts, and their Treatment of Intruders and Dissentients (1869)
- Memoir of Jared Sparks (1869)
- Life of Benjamin Thompson, Count Rumford, in connection with an edition of Rumford's complete works, issued by the American Academy of Arts and Sciences (1871)
- (as editor) History of the Massachusetts General Hospital (1872) (See Massachusetts General Hospital.)
- History of the Battle of Bunker Hill (1875)
- Address on the Centennial of the Evacuation by the British Army, with an Account of the Siege of Boston (1876)
- Memoir of Charles Wentworth Upham (1877) (See Charles Wentworth Upham.)
- Memoir of Jacob Bigelow (1880) (See Jacob Bigelow.)
- Memorial History of Boston, three historical chapters (1880-1)
- History of the First church in Boston, 1630-1880, with Arthur Blake Ellis (1881)
- The Red Man and the White Man in North America (1882)
- Memoir of Nathaniel Thayer, A. M. (1885; Google Books, archive.org)
- Address on the 82d Anniversary of the New York Historical Society (1886)
- Narrative and Critical History of America, “The Religious Element in New England” and other chapters (1886)
- The Puritan Age and Rule in the Colony of Massachusetts Bay, 1629-85 (1888)
- Articles for the ninth edition of the Encyclopædia Britannica.

He published numerous sermons and addresses, and contributed to periodicals. He also printed privately memoirs of Charles Wentworth Upham and Edward Wigglesworth (1804–1876) (1877).

== Personal life ==
In 1840, he married Elizabeth Bruce Eager. They had one child, and she died in 1842. In 1859, he married Lucretia Goddard Gould who died in 1869. His brother, Rufus Ellis, was a Unitarian minister also.
