= John Harvard Mall =

Plaza in Boston, Massachusetts, U.S.

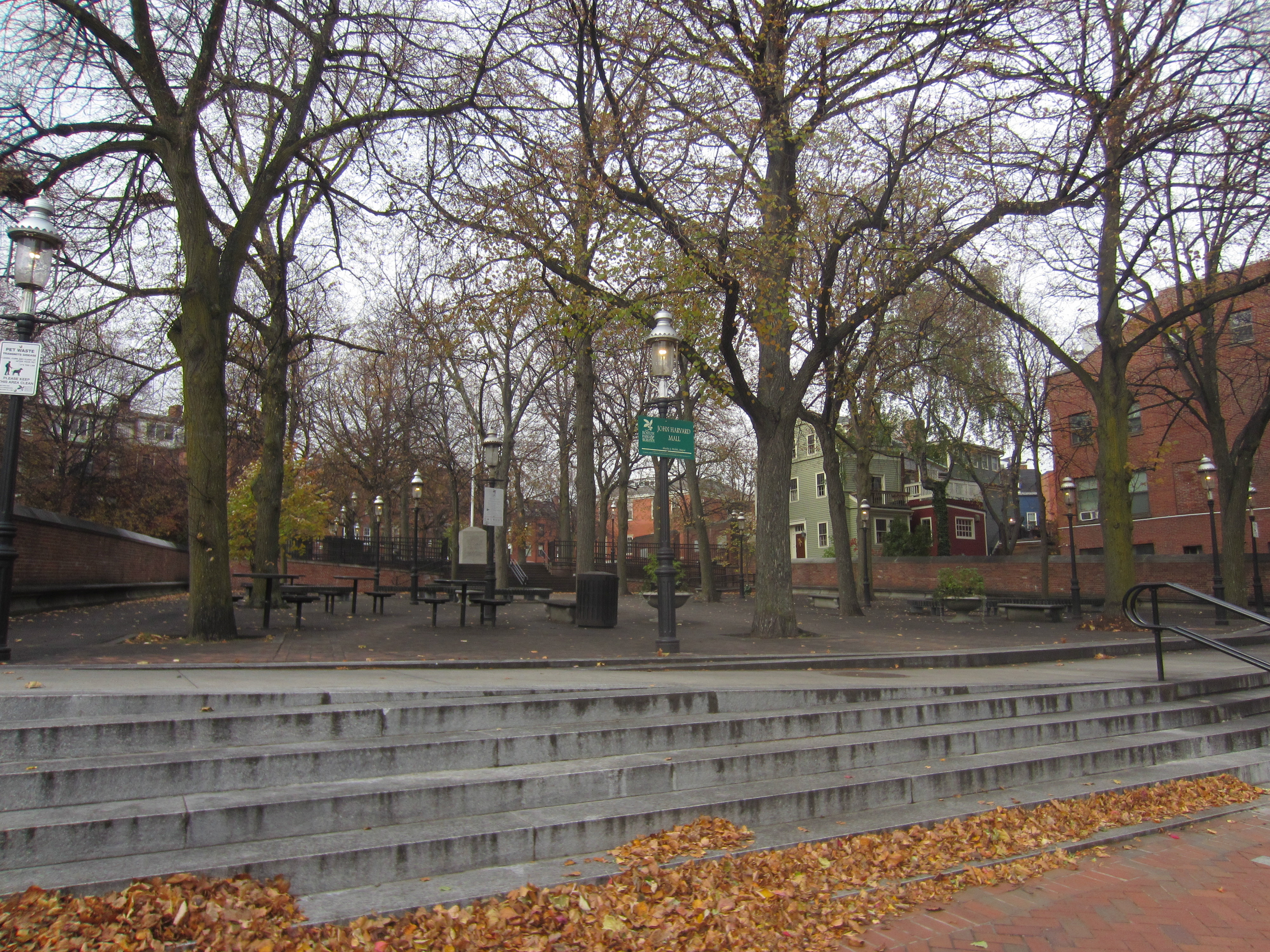
- South end of the mall in 2019

- Location within Boston
- Type: Brick plaza
- Location: Boston
- Coordinates: 42°22′21″N 71°03′45″W

Construction
- Inauguration: 1943

Other
- Website: Official website

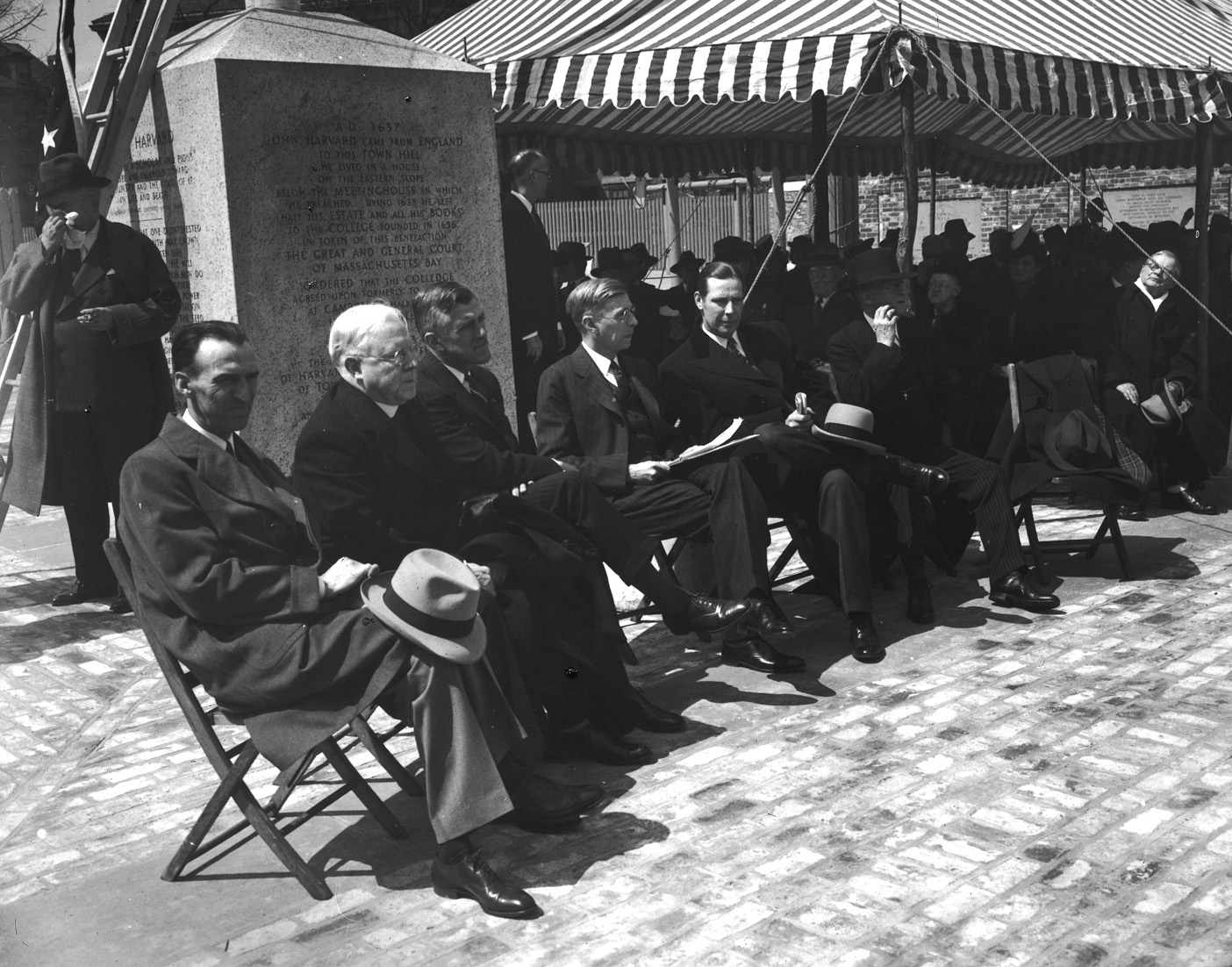
Dignitaries at the mall's dedication in 1943; seated, left to right: City Councilor, Michael Leo Kingella; Reverend Frederic J. Allchin; Honorable Leverett B. Saltonstall, Governor; President James B. Conant of Harvard; Honorable Maurice J. Tobin, Mayor of Boston; Reverend Thomas W. Davison.

John Harvard Mall is a brick plaza in Boston's Charlestown neighborhood, in the U.S. state of Massachusetts. It opened in 1943.

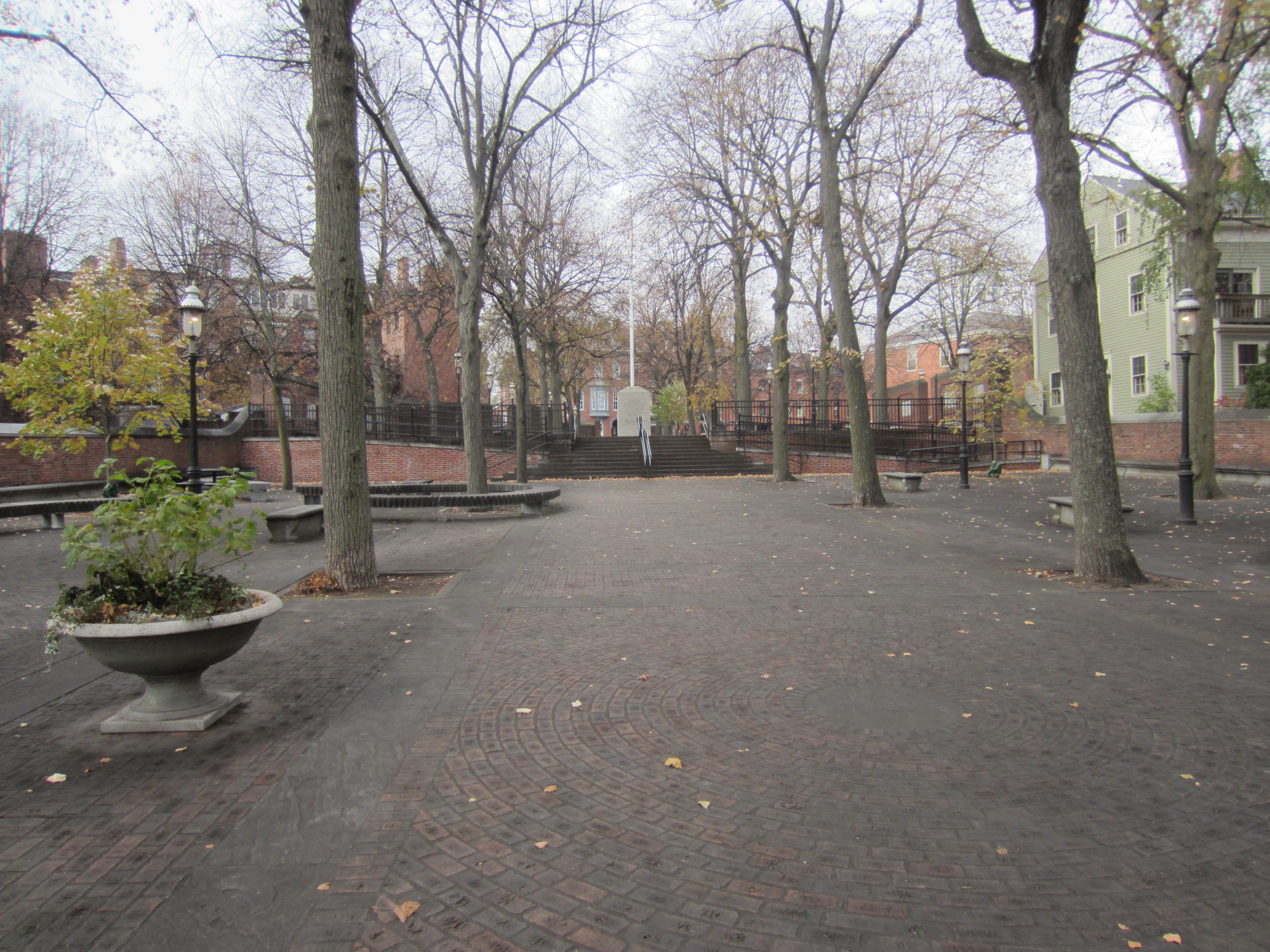

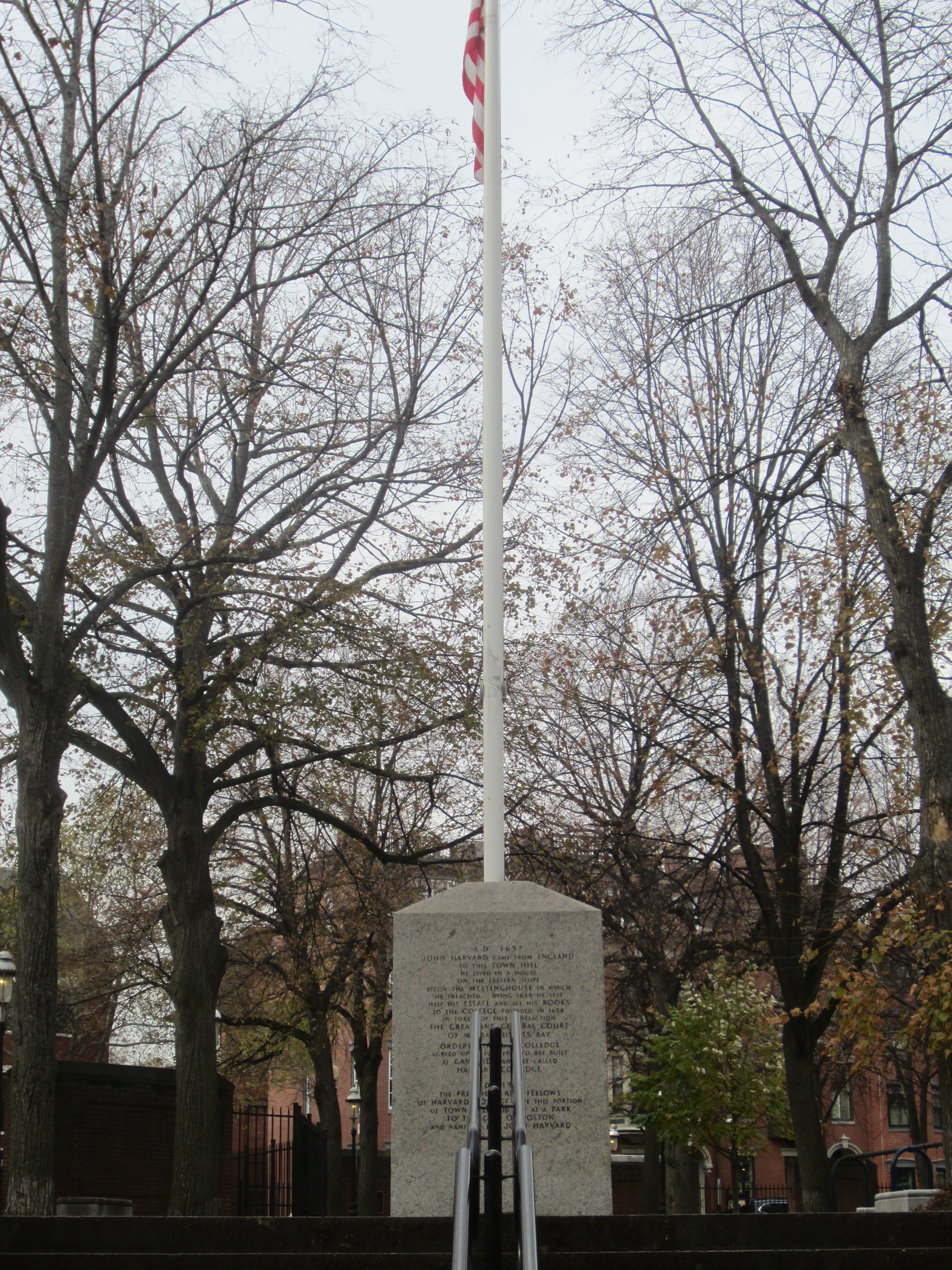

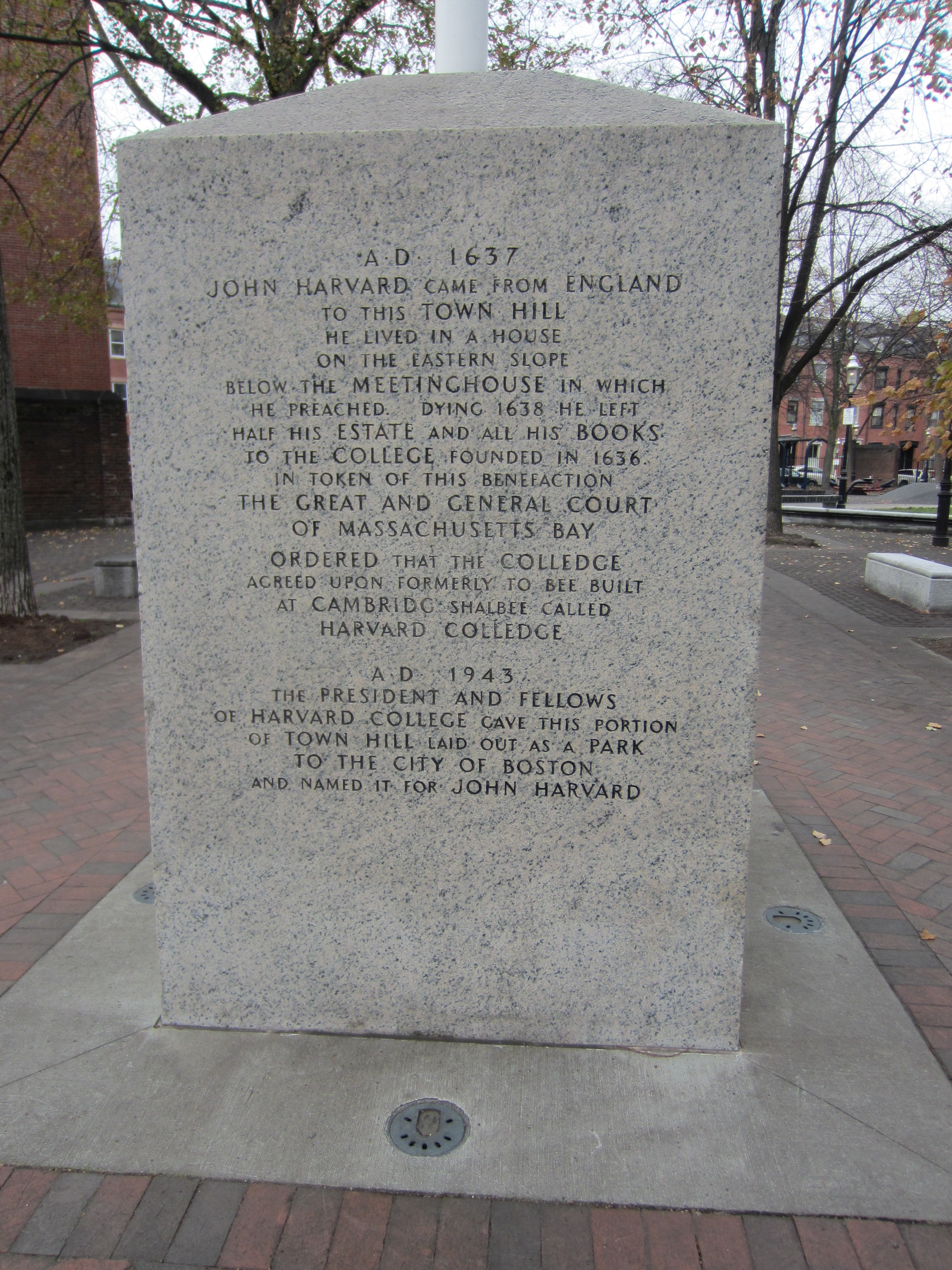

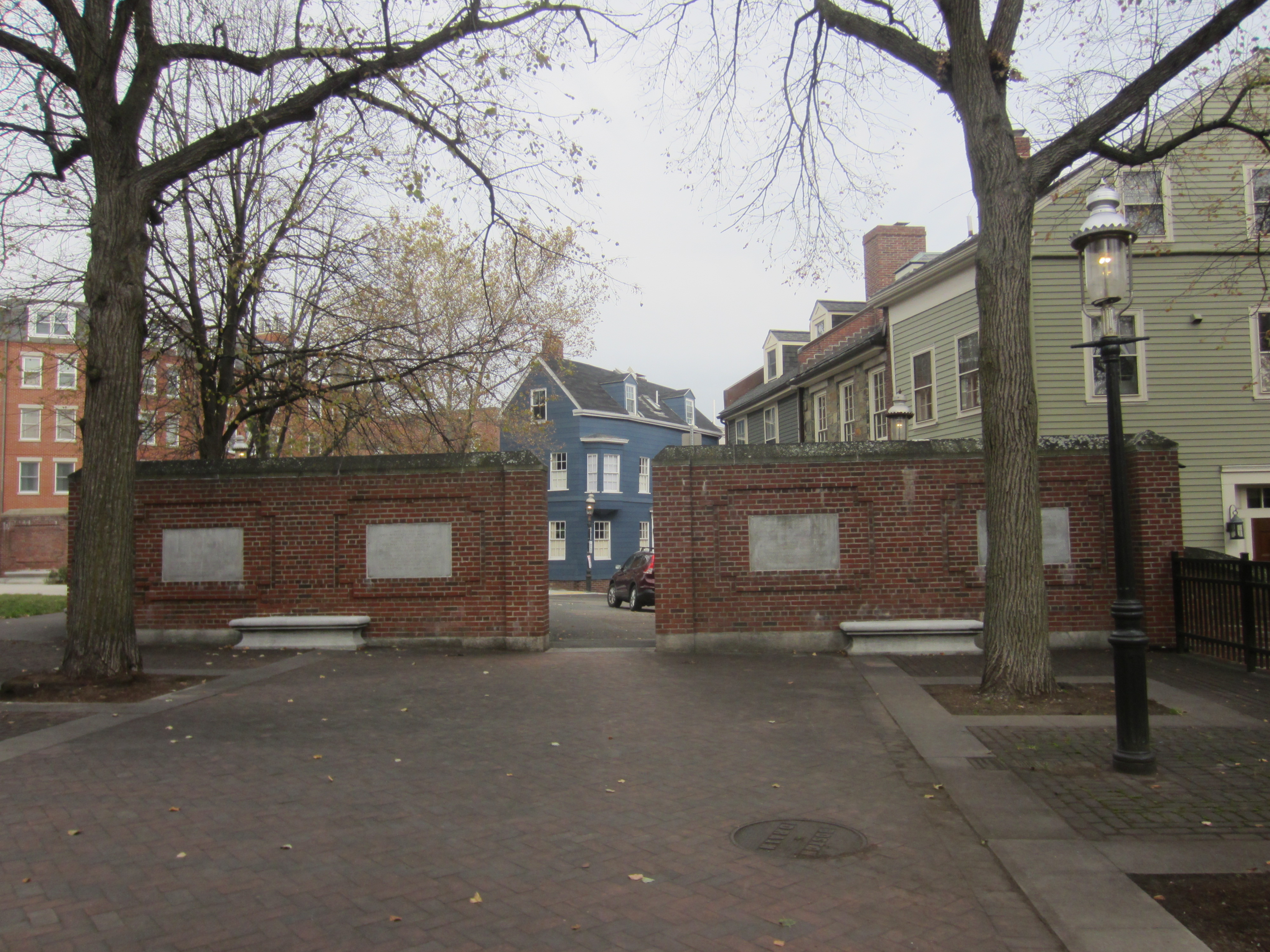
