= Rockland Osgood =

American opera singer

Rockland Osgood (born February 27, 1958, Montgomery, Alabama) is a contemporary American lyric tenor.

== Education ==
He received a B.A. from Huntingdon College followed by a master's degree from the New England Conservatory of Music. He was a Fellow at the Berkshire Music Center at Tanglewood and was a winner of the New York Oratorio Society Solo Competition as well as the National Association of Teachers of Singing Competition.

== Career ==
Osgood has performed with many musical organizations including the Boston Symphony Orchestra, Emmanuel Music of Boston, Handel and Haydn Society, the Sioux City Symphony Orchestra, the Jacksonville Symphony, Oregon Symphony, Boston Cecilia, Cantata Singers, Spectrum Singers, Chorus pro Musica, Spoleto Festival, North Carolina Symphony, Anchorage Opera, Mobile Opera, Brevard Music Center, Syracuse Opera, Boston Camerata, New York Choral Society, Oregon Symphony, and is a frequent soloist at the Northwest Bach Festival. Conductors include Seiji Ozawa, Gunther Schuller, James DePreist, Joel Revzen, David Hoose, Craig Smith, Kent Tritle, Michael Kleinschmidt, and John Rutter.

Osgood toured nationally with the Boston Camerata and includes in his repertoire such singular works as Distler's Weihnachtsgeschichte and Albert's Into Eclipse. He was a featured soloist with the New York Choral Society on their 1985 tour of Greece. He was soloist in the World Premiere of Richard Emery's Death at Wallowa Valley and Donald Sur’s Slavery Documents. In 2008, he performed the world premiere of Lior Navok's Slavery Documents 3: And the trains kept coming... with Cantata Singers. He also performed St. John Passion (Evangelist) at Trinity Church, Boston.

== Repertoire ==
- Bach: St. John Passion, St. Matthew Passion, b minor Mass, Magnificat
- Beethoven: Missa Solemnis, Mass in C
- Berg: Wozzeck
- Bernstein: Chichester Psalms
- Britten: War Requiem, St. Nicholas, Cantata Misericordia
- Distler: Weihnachtsgeschichte
- Handel: Messiah, Saul
- Haydn: Creation
- Mozart: Tamino Die Zauberflöte, Belmonte Die Entfuehrung aus dem Serail, Almaviva Il Barbiere di Siviglia, Don Ottavio Don Giovanni, Mass in c-minor
- Mendelssohn: Paulus, Symphony #2
- Navok: Slavery Documents 3: And the trains kept coming
- Orff: Carmina Burana
- Pinkham: St. Mark Passion
- Rossini: Messe di Gloria
- Stravinsky: Les Noces
- Sur: Slavery Documents
- Verdi: Requiem
- Vivaldi: Arsilda, Regina di Ponto

== Reviews ==
"The soloist that left me consistently amazed was Osgood. His part includes the demanding role of the narrating Evangelist who sings near the top of the tenor register, as well as arias that show a remarkable range of emotion. Osgood seemed as fresh in his furious finale (With fear the blackguard is all shaken) aria as he had been two hours earlier in his aria urging the shepherds to hasten to Christ's manger."

Travis Rivers, The Spokesman Review - February 3, 2003
