= Requiem (Harbison) =

Composition by John Harbison

The Requiem is a composition for soprano, mezzo-soprano, tenor, baritone, chorus, and orchestra by the American composer John Harbison. Composed over a period of seventeen years, the complete work was finished in 2002 on a commission from the Boston Symphony Orchestra. Its world premiere was given by the soprano Christine Brewer, mezzo-soprano Margaret Lattimore, tenor Paul Groves, baritone Jonathan Lemalu the Tanglewood Festival Chorus, and the Boston Symphony Orchestra under the direction of Bernard Haitink on March 6, 2003.

== Composition ==
=== Background ===
Harbison composed the first sketches of what would become his Requiem in early 1985. The music was written on the opposite side of a page that also contained the first passages his 1999 opera The Great Gatsby. Like The Great Gatsby, the Requiem wouldn't be completed for over a decade.

He composed much of the "Introit" over the course of 1985, but didn't return to the work until 1991, when he wrote a piece that would become the basis for the "Sanctus" on a commission from The Rivers School Conservatory. Harbison misplaced the score, however, requiring him to present a different piece for the school. He wouldn't find the sheet music of the "Sanctus" until seven years later.

Later, in 1995, Harbison was one of thirteen international composers commissioned by Internationale Bachakademie Stuttgart to write a movement for the collective Requiem of Reconciliation to commemorated the victims of World War II. Harbison was assigned the "Recordare" section (then titled "Juste judex"), which he based on musical ideas he had earlier developed for the "Introit."

Then, in 1999, he "very spontaneously" composed a "Hostias" section and was motivated to finish the Requiem. Finally, a 2001 commission from the Boston Symphony Orchestra allowed him to complete the work.

The Latin text of the Requiem is set to traditional sections of the Requiem Mass, scripture, and a medieval poem "all added in at different times, but acquiring a weight and dignity through use and age." The composer wrote, "I wanted a sense of ancient inheritance to inhabit my setting: a ritual steeped in the inevitability of death – gradually moving toward consolation and acceptance."

Harbison composed the piece through the initial shock and aftermath of the September 11 attacks, causing him to reflect on the meaning of the composition. He recalled, "My account of the genesis of the piece makes it clear that its sources go back fifteen years. But the events of that fall made my purposes clearer. I wanted my piece to have a sense of the inexorability of the passage of time, for good and ill, of the commonality of love and loss. I wanted to open up an aural space where this could be acknowledged." He continued:

Ideally this piece is not coercively about how you should feel, but rather an offer of a place to be true to your own thoughts. I inscribed, as I wrote this piece over seventeen years, the names of loved ones who died in that time, not to tell the listener about my reaction, but to remind myself that only living alertly in our own immediate lives gives us any comprehension of war, disaster, destruction on a wider scale. I wanted a way to jump with the text from past to present to future, from they to we to I.

=== Structure ===
The Requiem has a duration of approximately 58 minutes and is composed in two parts comprising thirteen smaller movements:

Part I

Introit
Sequence I: Dies irae
Sequence II: Tuba mirum
Sequence III: Liber scriptus
Sequence IV: Quid sum miser
Sequence V: Recordare
Sequence VI: Confutatis – Lacrymosa

Part II

Offertorium
Sanctus
Agnus Dei
Lux aeterna
Libera me
In paradisum

Harbison described the two parts as "an accidental collection of words about mortality (part I) and continuity (part II), to be shaped into a purposeful collection of sounds."

=== Instrumentation ===
The work is scored for solo soprano, mezzo-soprano, tenor, baritone, SATB chorus, and an orchestra consisting of two flutes (2nd doubling piccolo), two oboes, two clarinets, two bassoons (2nd doubling contrabassoon), two horns, two trumpets, three trombones, timpani, three percussionists, piano (doubling celesta), harp, and strings.

== Reception ==
The Requiem has been praised by music critics. Reviewing the world premiere, Lloyd Schwartz of The Phoenix remarked, "There's such amplitude, so much going on, it's more than one can take in from a single hearing (I went back to hear it again). On opening night, the audience gave the piece, the performers, and the composer a prolonged standing ovation." He added, "In this Requiem, the variety is there, certainly in the glittering array of orchestral color. Yet the tone is consistent — yearning, struggling, tragic. Even the most joyous music is permeated with foreboding, and that ties it to our own time. And as we know from the great Requiems of Verdi, Berlioz, and Fauré, these are the very pieces that last." Richard Dyer of The Boston Globe similarly described it as "a particularly radiant work." The music was also praised by Ellen Pfeifer of The Wall Street Journal and Bernard Holland of The New York Times, who wrote, "There is more to this piece than simply medievalism revised, but one feels in it a chill of old churches, and this creates the overriding impression. Mr. Harbison describes his piece as 'a place to be true to your own thoughts.' I would have preferred him to be more selfish, but in the end one admired his modest steadfastness."
