= Symphony No. 4 (Harbison) =

Symphony by John Harbison

The Symphony No. 4 is an orchestral composition by the American composer John Harbison. The work was commissioned by the Seattle Symphony with contributions from the philanthropists Richard and Constance Albrecht. It was given its world premiere in Seattle on June 17, 2004 by the Seattle Symphony under the direction of Gerard Schwarz.

== Composition ==
=== Background ===
The symphony was composed during a turbulent period in Harbison's life when his wife became very ill. The composer wrote in the score program notes, "One morning at eight, in Bogliasco, Italy, where I was working, I receive a phone call - two o'clock the caller's time. I cannot describe the knowledge that struck during that call except to say that the breath of mortality, bearing at this moment on the person closest to me, came suddenly and radically near." He continued:

Other action temporarily impossible, I went to work and by eleven A.M. had composed in every detail the fourth movement, which (perhaps superstitiously) I have not subsequently revised. This "Threnody" is not about loss but about the imminence and inevitability of loss at times we of course do not choose. Its early completion, far ahead now of the rest of the piece, affected the character of the whole symphony, especially the last movement, whose ritual formality embraces, the frantic dance and march which attempt to modify its character.

=== Structure ===
The symphony has a duration of roughly 27 minutes and is composed in five movements:

1. Fanfare
2. Intermezzo
3. Scherzo
4. Threnody
5. Finale

=== Instrumentation ===
The work is scored for a large orchestra comprising three flutes (3rd doubling piccolo), three oboes (3rd doubling English horn), three clarinets (3rd doubling bass clarinet), three bassoons (3rd doubling contrabassoon), four horns, two trumpets, two trombones, tuba, timpani, three percussionists, piano, harp, and strings.

== Reception ==
The symphony has been praised by music critics. Lisa Hirsch of the San Francisco Classical Voice wrote, "It's an engrossing work, full of interesting detail and structural experimentation. Like the Mahler and Ravel, it deploys a very large orchestra, but the effects provided by that orchestra seem more studied and less organic than those in its companions, thought through rather than arising naturally from the melodic and harmonic elements of the work." Keith Powers of the Boston Classical Review compared the symphony with Harbison's 1999 opera The Great Gatsby, writing:

The music shifts ideas incessantly: the opening Fanfare carries the flavor of Gatsby, presenting a pastiche of jazzy ideas, set in formal structures. The second movement offers a bewildering array of themes, connected by a mood of introspection. The scherzo, the most straightforward of the sections, lacks humor but suggests an antic energy. The centerpiece, a fourth movement labeled Threnody, begins with a string-based theme, deeply lyrical and pensive, with accents from the back of the orchestra. The Finale creates some ease for the listener, shifting to less tense, major harmonies.

Matthew Guerrieri of The Boston Globe was slightly more critical of the work, however, saying "...the whole symphony feels like workings-through, of influences, forms, processes, difficulties." He added, "The opening and closing movements had crisp force; the quieter movements, especially the piecemeal transparency of the 'Intermezzo,' were more skittish and hesitant."
