= Frederick Burchinal =

American operatic baritone

Frederick Burchinal (born December 7, 1944) is an American operatic baritone, whose career centered on the works of Giuseppe Verdi as well as verismo opera more broadly. Burchinal is best known for his association with the Metropolitan Opera, and sang with the company for over 22 years.

== Biography and career ==
Frederick Burchinal was born in Wichita, Kansas on December 7, 1948. He attended Emporia State University, later receiving his masters from Juilliard School. Burchinal made his professional debut as Fiorello in Il baribiere di Siviglia with Denver Lyric Opera. He made his European debut in Amsterdam in 1976, performing in Carlisle Floyd’s Of Mice and Men. Burchinal would go on to appear with opera companies across Europe, including Paris Opera, Bastille as Simon Boccanegra, with the Theatre Royal de Ia Monnaie in Amsterdam at the Concertgebouw as Iago in Otello, with the Israel Philharmonic Orchestra as Rigoletto, and at the Teatro Municipal in Santiago as Ezio in Attila. He was a frequent guest at Deutsche Oper am Rhein, Düsseldorf (Rigoletto, Macbeth, La Traviata, Aida, Don Carlo, Tosca, Parsifal and I puritani), Cologne Opera (Simon Boccanegra, The Rake's Progress, Lucia di Lammermoor), Deutsche Oper Berlin (Aida and Lucia di Lammermoor); Oper Frankfurt (Otello, Macbeth, Tosca, Un Ballo in Maschera, Pagliacci, and Iphigenie en Aulide) Opéra national de Montpellier (Macbeth and La Forza del Destino) and also appeared with Royal Opera House, London (Thea Musgrave's A Christmas Carol), Nice (La forza del destino), the VARA radio at the Concertgebouw (La Gioconda), Zurich (Il trovatore), Glasgow Scottish Opera (I due Foscari), and with Copenhagen Royal Opera (La traviata and Don Carlos). In addition to his frequent appearances in Europe, Burchinal performed with opera companies throughout the Americas, including São Paulo Opera, Brazil (Tosca and Falstaff), Santiago Opera, Chile (Attila and Otello), Caracas Opera, Venezuela (Carmen and Luisa Miller), as well as with Calgary Opera, (Tosca) and Vancouver Opera (La bohème).

In 1979, Burchinal sang the role of Scrooge in the world premiere of Thea Musgrave's A Christmas Carol. The opera was premiered by the Virginia Opera Association in Norfolk, Virginia, and was later recorded by Granada Television at the Royal Opera House, London.

Also in 1979, Burchinal appeared as Tony in the Broadway revival of The Most Happy Fella.

In 2006 Burchinal joined the faculty of the Hugh Hodgson School of Music, becoming the director of the University of Georgia Opera Theatre Department and was the inaugural recipient of the Wyatt and Margaret Anderson Professorship in the Arts, and endowed professorship in the Franklin College of Arts and Sciences.

== Career at the Metropolitan Opera ==
=== Beginnings ===
Frederick Burchinal first appeared with the Metropolitan Opera as a member of what would eventually become the Lindemann Young Artist Development Program on October 18, 1974, in the US premier of Benjamin Britten's Death in Venice. The premiere coincided with the Met debut of tenor Peter Peers. In 1975 Burchinal joined the Met's tour of Japan, performing Marquis D'Obigny in Giuseppe Verdi's La Traviata, alongside Joan Sutherland and Cornell MacNeil.

=== Return and the tragic Macbeth ===
Burchinal returned to the Metropolitan Opera in January 1988 to sing the title role in Verdi's Macbeth, joined by Samuel Ramey as Banquo. During the second intermission of Burchinal's 5th performance, an audience member committed suicide by jumping from the fifth balcony, commonly referred to as the "Family Circle". The performance marked the second time in Met Opera history that a performance was stopped mid-production; the previous stoppage occurred on March 4, 1960, when baritone Leonard Warren suffered a fatal cerebral hemorrhage during a performance of La forza del destino. The Met's last mid-show stoppage to date occurred on January 5, 1996, when tenor Richard Versailles suffered a fatal heart attack on stage only a few minutes into the first act of The Makropulos Case by Leoš Janáček.

=== Highlights ===
Following his successfully addition to the Met roster in '88, Burchinal went on to have a long association with the operas of Giuseppe Verdi at the Met: including performances as the titular Nabucco, Amonasro in Aida, Iago in the 2006 broadcast of Otello with Ben Heppner, as well as 19 performances as the titular Rigoletto. Burchinal also commonly performed in verismo operas, including the role Alfio in Cavalleria rusticana, Tonio in Pagliacci, Sharpless in Madama Butterfly, Gerard in Andrea Chénier, Michele in Il tabarro, and Scarpia in Tosca. While more associated with Italian opera, Burchinal was also a frequent interpreter of French opera at the Met, including the roles of Golaud in Pelléas et Mélisande, the High Priest in Samson et Delilah, and Capulet in Roméo et Juliette. In 1999 Burchinal sang the role of Henry Gatz in the world premiere of John Harbison's The Great Gatsby.

During his time at the Metropolitan Opera, Burchinal sang with famed opera singers such as Plácido Domingo, Joyce DiDonato, Natalie Dessay, Anna Netrebko, Rolando Villazón, Deborah Voigt, Dmitri Hvorostovsky, Ramón Vargas, Denyce Graves, Nicolai Ghiaurov, Sumi Jo, Jerry Hadley, Kurt Moll, Paul Plishka, Richard Leech, James Morris, Dawn Upshaw, and Ben Heppner, among many others.

Burchinal's last performance with the Metropolitan Opera was as Michele in Il Tabarro in 2007.

Roles at the Metropolitan Opera
Opera	Role
Aida	Amonasro
Andrea Chénier	Carlo Gérard
Cavalleria rusticana	Alfio
Death in Venice	English Clerk/ Jaschiu's Father/ Young Man
La gioconda	Banarba
La traviata	Marquis D'Obigny
Macbeth	Macbeth
Madama Butterfly	Sharpless
Il tabarro	Michele
Nabucco	Nabucco
Otello	Iago
Otello	Montãno
Pagliacci	Tonio
Pelléas et Mélisande	Golaud
Queen of Spades	Count Tomsky
Rigoletto	Rigoletto
Roméo et Juliette	Capulet
Samson et Delilah	High Priest
Simon Boccanegra	Simon Boccanegra
The Great Gatsby	Henry Gatz
Tosca	Scarpia

== Discography ==
1. Wiel, Kurt. Die Burgschaft. conducted by Julius Rudel. Performed Ann Panagulias, soprano; Margaret Thompson, Katherine Ciesinski, mezzo-sopranos; Peter Lurié, Joel Sorenson, Enrico Di Giuseppe, Mark Duffin, John Daniecki, tenors; Frederick Burchinal, Lawrence Craig, baritones; Herbert Perry, Dale Travis, basses; Westminster Choir and the Spoleto Festival USA Orchestra. Warner Classics - Parlophone. OCLC 961805913. 2000. CD.
2. Musgrave, Thea. A Christmas Carol. Conducted by Peter Mark. Performed by Frederick Burchinal, baritone; Claudette Peterson, soprano; Kathryn Montgomery, soprano; Carolyne James, mezzo-soprano; Jerold Norman, tenor; Howard Bender, baritone; Robert Randolph, baritone; and the Virginia Opera Association Orchestra. MMG. OCLC 7300810. 1980. CD.
