= John Chest =

American opera singer

- Born: 6 July 1985 (age 41); Greenville, South Carolina, United States
- Occupation: Opera singer (baritone)
- Years active: 2009–present
- Website: johnchest.com

John Chest (born July 6, 1985) is an American baritone opera singer performing with leading opera companies around the world.

== Career ==
John Chest was born in Greenville, South Carolina, to parents Sandra Marie Chest and Robert Davis Chest. He started his professional voice studies at Bob Jones University where he got his Bachelor of Music in Voice Performance from 2003 to 2007. He then studied at CCPA (Chicago College of Performing Arts) at Roosevelt University, where he graduated with a Master of Music (Voice Performance) in 2009 after two years.

He joined the apprentice program at Santa Fe Opera for the summer of 2008 where he covered the Bosun in Britten's Billy Budd (an introduction to an opera in which he is now known for playing the title role). Chest joined the Merola Opera Program at San Francisco Opera in 2009 and there sang Guglielmo in Così fan tutte. He concluded his formal studies as a member of the professional Opernstudio at Bavarian State Opera in Munich from 2009 to 2011, singing in more than eighty performances with Germany's largest opera company.

Chest continued to train with the Chicago Opera Theater, in addition to joining the ensemble of Deutsche Oper Berlin, where he remained until 2016. His roles in Berlin included the title role of Billy Budd in a new production by David Alden; Valentin (Faust), Ford (Falstaff), Silvio (Pagliacci), Figaro (Il barbiere di Siviglia), Papageno (Die Zauberflöte), Gugliemo (Così fan tutte) and Il Conte Almaviva (Le nozze di Figaro).

A finalist in the BBC Singer of the World Art Song Competition, he has also appeared in recital at the Aix-en-Provence Festival, the Philharmonie de Paris, and Wigmore Hall. He has made appearances on three Fauré CD's with pianist Malcolm Martineau.

== Repertory ==
Year	Role	Composer	Opera	Location
2024	Aristobolo	Händel	Berenice	Théâtre des Champs-Elysées
2024	Marcello	Puccini	La bohème	Trondheim Symfoniorkester & Opera
2023	Figaro	Rossini	Il barbiere di Siviglia	Kraków Philharmonic
2023	Guglielmo	Mozart	Così fan tutte	Opera Theatre of St Louis
2023	Il Conte di Almaviva	Mozart	Le nozze di Figaro	Bayerische Staatsoper
2023	Figaro	Rossini	Il barbiere di Siviglia	Teatro Regio di Torino
2022	Melisso	Händel	Alcina	Angers Nantes Opéra
2022	Il Conte di Almaviva	Mozart	Le nozze di Figaro	Théâtres de la Ville de Luxembourg
2022	Rodrigue	Verdi	Don Carlos	Theater Basel
2021	Valens	Händel	Theodora	Teatro alla Scala
2021	Il Conte di Almaviva	Mozart	Le nozze di Figaro	Grand Théâtre de la Ville de Luxembourg
2019	Billy Budd	Benjamin Britten	Billy Budd	San Francisco Opera
2018	Pelléas	Debussy	Pelléas et Mélisande	Glyndebourne
2018	Marcello	Puccini	La bohème	Semperoper Dresden
2017	Guglielmo	Mozart	Così fan tutte	Bayerische Staatsoper
2017	Billy Budd	Benjamin Britten	Billy Budd	Deutsche Oper Berlin
2017	Nick Carraway	John Harbison	The Great Gatsby	Semperoper Dresden
2017	Conte Almaviva	Mozart	Le nozze di Figaro	Opera Philadelphia
2017	Valentin	Gounod	Faust	Deutsche Oper Berlin
2017	Engel	Scartazzini	Edward II (world premiere)	Deutsche Oper Berlin
2016–17	Papageno	Mozart	Die Zauberflöte	Deutsche Oper Berlin
2016–17	Guglielmo	Mozart	Così fan tutte	Deutsche Oper Berlin
2016–17	Figaro	Rossini	Il barbiere di Siviglia	Deutsche Oper Berlin
2016	Valentin	Gounod	Faust	Théâtre du Capitole
2016	Nazarener	Strauss	Salome	Grand Théâtre de la Ville de Luxembourg
2016	Ein Kappadozier	Strauss	Salome	Grand Théâtre de la Ville de Luxembourg
2016	Albert	Massenet	Werther	Théâtre des Champs-Elysées
2016	Don Giovanni	Mozart	Don Giovanni	Angers-Nantes Opéra
2016	Marchese d'Obigny	Verdi	La traviata	Deutsche Oper Berlin
2016	Belcore	Donizetti	L'elisir d'amore	Deutsche Oper Berlin
2015	Nick Carraway	John Harbison	The Great Gatsby	Semperoper Dresden
2015–16	Figaro	Rossini	Il barbiere di Siviglia	Deutsche Oper Berlin
2015	Il Conte di Almaviva	Mozart	Le nozze di Figaro	Deutsche Oper Berlin
2015	Papageno	Mozart	Die Zauberflöte	Deutsche Oper Berlin
2015	Rosalinde	Strauss	Die Fledermaus	Vancouver Opera
2015	Silvio	Leoncavallo	Pagliacci	Deutsche Oper Berlin
2015	Demetrius	Benjamin Britten	A Midsummer Night's Dream	Festival d'Aix-en-Provence
2015	Fritz	Korngold	Die tote Stadt	Opéra national de Lorraine
2015	Fritz	Korngold	Die tote Stadt	Angers-Nantes Opéra
2015	Figaro	Rossini	Il barbiere di Siviglia	Deutsche Oper Berlin
2014–15	Papageno	Mozart	Die Zauberflöte	Deutsche Oper Berlin
2014	Ford	Verdi	Falstaff	Deutsche Oper Berlin
2014	Marcello	Puccini	La bohème	Deutsche Oper Berlin
2014	Sprecher	Mozart	Die Zauberflöte	Deutsche Oper Berlin
