= List of institute professors at the Massachusetts Institute of Technology =

The title of Institute professor is an honor bestowed by the Faculty and Administration of MIT on a faculty colleague who has demonstrated exceptional distinction by a combination of leadership, accomplishment, and service in the scholarly, educational, and general intellectual life of the Institute or wider academic community.

— MIT Policies and Procedures: Special Professorial Appointments, Institute Professor

Institute professor is the highest title that can be awarded to a faculty member at the Massachusetts Institute of Technology (MIT), a research university located in Cambridge, Massachusetts, United States. It is analogous to the titles of distinguished professor, university professor, or regents professor used at other universities in recognition of a professor's extraordinary research achievements and dedication to the school. At MIT, institute professors are granted a unique level of freedom and flexibility to pursue their research and teaching interests without regular departmental or school responsibilities; they report only to the provost. Usually no more than twelve professors hold this distinction at any one time.

Institute professors are initially nominated by leaders representing either a department or school. The chair of the faculty then consults with the Academic Council and jointly appoints with the president an ad-hoc committee from various departments and non-MIT members to evaluate the qualifications and make a documented recommendation to the president. The final determination is made based upon recommendations from professionals in the nominee's field. The case is then reviewed again by the Academic Council and approved by the executive committee of the MIT Corporation. The position was created by President James R. Killian in 1951, and John C. Slater was the first to hold the title.

== List of institute professors ==
=== Current ===
| Name | Department | Elected | Notability | Reference |
|---|---|---|---|---|
| Daron Acemoglu | Economics | 2019 | Author of Why Nations Fail; John Bates Clark Medal (2005); Nobel Memorial Prize in Economics (2024) | |
| Suzanne Berger | Political Science | 2019 | Fellow of the American Academy of Arts and Sciences; chevalier of France's Legion of Honour (2009) | |
| Arup Chakraborty | Chemical Engineering | 2021 | Fellow of all three United States National academies; founding director of MIT’s Institute for Medical Engineering and Science | |
| Sallie W. Chisholm | Civil and Environmental Engineering | 2015 | Discovery and biology of the Prochlorococcus marine cyanobacteria | |
| Ann Graybiel | Brain and Cognitive Sciences | 2008 | Expert on the basal ganglia; National Medal of Science (2001) | |
| Paula T. Hammond | Chemical Engineering | 2021 | Fellow of the American Academy of Arts and Sciences, and all three United States National academies | |
| Robert S. Langer | Chemical Engineering & Biological Engineering | 2005 | Drug delivery and tissue engineering; youngest person to be elected to all three United States National academies; Millennium Technology Prize (2008), National Medal of Science (2007), Draper Prize (2002), and Lemelson-MIT Prize (1998) | |
| Thomas Magnanti | Mechanical Engineering | 1997 | Operations research; Dean of Engineering (1999–2007) | |
| Marcus Thompson | Music and Theater Arts | 2015 | Artistic director of Boston Chamber Music Society | |

=== Emeritus ===
| Name | Department | Elected | Notability | Reference |
|---|---|---|---|---|
| Emilio Bizzi | Brain and Cognitive Sciences | 2002 | Motor control; President of the American Academy of Arts and Sciences (2006–2009) | |
| Noam Chomsky | Linguistics and Philosophy | 1976 | Generative grammar; Kyoto Prize (1988); political activist and one of the most widely cited scholars alive | |
| John M. Deutch | Chemistry | 1990 | Director of Central Intelligence (1995–1996); Deputy Secretary of Defense (1994–1995); Provost of MIT (1985–1990) | |
| Peter A. Diamond | Economics | 1997 | Social Security reform; Nobel Memorial Prize in Economic Sciences (2010) | |
| Jerome I. Friedman | Physics | 1991 | Quantum chromodynamics; Nobel Prize in Physics (1990) | |
| John Harbison | Music and Theater Arts | 1995 | MacArthur Fellow (1989); Pulitzer Prize for Music (1987) for The Flight into Egypt | |
| Barbara Liskov | Electrical Engineering and Computer Science | 2008 | Contributions to data abstraction and programming languages; Turing Award (2008) and John von Neumann Medal (2004) | |
| John D.C. Little | Management | | Little's law and Branch and bound; contributions to marketing and e-commerce | |
| Ron Rivest | Electrical Engineering and Computer Science | 2015 | Co-inventor of the RSA algorithm; founder of Verisign and RSA Security | |
| Phillip Sharp | Biology | 1999 | RNA interference and splicing; Nobel Prize in Physiology or Medicine (1993) | |
| Sheila Widnall | Aeronautical and Astronautical Engineering | 1998 | Secretary of the Air Force (1993–1997); first woman to chair the MIT faculty; first MIT alumna appointed to MIT engineering faculty | |

=== Deceased ===
| Name | Department | Elected | Notability | Reference |
|---|---|---|---|---|
| Mildred S. Dresselhaus | Physics & Electrical Engineering | 1985 | Carbon nanotubes; National Medal of Science (1990) | |
| Murray Eden | Electrical Engineering | 1959–1994 | Biomedical Engineering and Instrumentation Program directors award | |
| Manson Benedict | Nuclear Engineering | 1969 | National Medal of Science (1975) | |
| Joel Moses | Electrical Engineering and Computer Science | 1999 | Algebraic manipulation algorithms and MACSYMA; Provost of MIT (1995–1998); Dean of Engineering (1991–1995) | |
| Norbert Wiener | Mathematics | 1959 | National Medal of Science (1964) | |
| Gordon S. Brown | Electrical Engineering and Computer Science | 1973 | Automatic feedback-control systems and computer numerical control; Dean of Engineering (1959–1968) | |
| Martin Julian Buerger | Mineralogy | 1956 | Crystallography | |
| Morris Cohen | Material Science and Engineering | 1974 | Metallurgy of steel | |
| Charles S. Draper | Electrical Engineering and Computer Science | 1966 | Inertial guidance and gyro gunsight; founder of the Instrumentation Laboratory | |
| Harold Eugene "Doc" Edgerton | Electrical Engineering and Computer Science | 1966 | High-speed photography; Co-founder of EG&G; National Medal of Science (1973) | |
| Herman Feshbach | Physics | 1983 | Nuclear reaction theory; National Medal of Science (1986) | |
| Edwin R. Gilliland | Chemical Engineering | 1971 | Fractional distillation columns and fluidized catalytic cracking; President's Science Advisory Committee (1961–1965) | |
| Hermann Anton Haus | Electrical Engineering and Computer Science | 1986 | Optical communications; National Medal of Science (1995) | |
| Arthur von Hippel | Electrical Engineering and Computer Science | 1962 | Dielectric materials | |
| Arthur Thomas Ippen | Civil Engineering | 1970 | Hydraulic engineering and water resources | |
| Roman O. Jakobson | Linguistics and Philosophy | | Expert on Russian formalism, Slavic studies and linguistics | |
| György Kepes | Architecture | 1970 | Founded the Center for Advanced Visual Studies; Bauhaus contributor; Hungarian Medal of Honor and Middle Cross (1996) | |
| Norman Levinson | Mathematics | 1971 | Non-linear differential equations, mathematical analysis, and analytic number theory; testified at 1953 House Un-American Activities Committee | |
| Francis E. Low | Physics | | Condensed matter physics; Provost of MIT (1980–1985) | |
| Franco Modigliani | Economics & Management | 1970 | Nobel Memorial Prize in Economic Sciences (1985) | |
| Mario Molina | Earth, Atmosphere, and Planetary Sciences | 1997 | Stratospheric ozone chemistry; Nobel Prize in Chemistry (1995) | |
| Philip Morrison | Physics | 1973 | Theoretical astrophysics | |
| Walle J. H. Nauta | Brain and Cognitive Sciences | 1973 | Nauta Silver Impregnation Method used to trace degenerating nerve fibers | |
| Walter A. Rosenblith | Electrical Engineering and Computer Science | 1975 | Psychoacoustics; elected to all three United States National academies; Provost of MIT (1971–1980) | |
| Bruno Rossi | Physics | 1966 | X-ray astronomy and discovery of cosmic rays; Wolf Prize (1987) and National Medal of Science (1983) | |
| Paul Samuelson | Economics | 1966 | National Medal of Science (1996), Nobel Memorial Prize in Economic Sciences (1970), and John Bates Clark Medal (1947) | |
| Francis O. Schmitt | Biology | 1955 | Biological electron microscopy | |
| Nevin S. Scrimshaw | Nutrition and Food Science | 1980 | Eliminating nutritional deficiency; World Food Prize (1991) | |
| Ascher H. Shapiro | Mechanical Engineering | 1975 | Fluid mechanics and biomedical engineering | |
| Isadore Singer | Mathematics | 1987 | Atiyah–Singer index theorem; Abel Prize (2004) | |
| John C. Slater | Physics | 1951 | Quantum theory and electromagnetic theory of microwaves; advisor to William Shockley | |
| Cyril S. Smith | Materials Science & Humanities | | Metallurgy, crystallography, and metallography of archaeological artifacts | |
| Carl R. Soderberg | Mechanical Engineering | 1959 | Steam turbine electric generators; Dean of Engineering (1954–1959); consultant on the J-57 turbojet | |
| Charles H. Townes | Physics | 1961 | Quantum Electronics and Maser; National Medal of Science (1982) and Nobel Prize in Physics (1964) | |
| Daniel I.C. Wang | Chemical Engineering | 1995 | Biochemical process engineering | |
| John S. Waugh | Chemistry | | Computational studies of spin systems | |
| Victor Weisskopf | Physics | 1965 | Co-founder of the Union of Concerned Scientists; Wolf Prize (1981) and National Medal of Science (1980) | |
| Jerome Wiesner | Electrical Engineering and Computer Science | 1980 | Chairman of the President's Science Advisory Committee (1961–1964); Dean of Science (1964–1966); Provost of MIT (1966–1971); President of MIT (1971–1980) | |
| Jerrold R. Zacharias | Nuclear Science and Engineering | 1966 | Atomic beams and clocks; microwave radar; educational reform | |
| Chia-Chiao Lin | Mathematics | 1966 | Fluid mechanics | |
| Morris Halle | Linguistics and Philosophy | 1981 | Phonology; Author of The Sound Pattern of English | |
| Robert M. Solow | Economics | 1973 | National Medal of Science (1999), Nobel Memorial Prize in Economic Sciences (1987), and John Bates Clark Medal (1961) | |
| David Baltimore | Biology | 1995 | Nobel Prize in Physiology or Medicine (1975) | |
