= Annette Schlünz =

German classical composer and musician

Annette Schlünz (born 23 September 1964) is a German musician and composer.

== Biography ==
Schlünz was born in Dessau, East Germany. She studied music at the Dresden Music School from 1983 to 1987 with Udo Zimmermann and at the Academy of Arts in Berlin from 1988 to 1991 with Paul-Heinz Dittrich. She also studied with Iannis Xenakis at Darmstadt and Helmut Lachenmann in Stuttgart.

Schlünz took a teaching position at the Dresden Center for Contemporary Music in 1987 and taught at the Dresden Music School from 1987 to 1992. She went on a concert and lecture tour in South America in 1996, and also appeared in Denmark, France, Spain, the USA, and Vietnam in 2001. She has also lectured at the electronic music studio of the Academy of Arts in Berlin, the Brandenburg Colloquium, the Akademie Schloss Solitude in Stuttgart and the German Academy at the Villa Massimo in Rome. She was composer-in-residence at GRAME Centre National de Création Musicale in Lyon in 2005.

== Honors and awards ==
- Hanns Eisler Prize (1990)
- Heidelberg Artists Award (1998)
- Prize of the German Record Critics' Award (1999, for the EMI Classics recording of MOCCOLI)
- Scholarships to Darmstadt (1990, 1992)

== Works ==
Schlünz has composed music for stage, chamber ensemble, vocal, and multimedia works. Selected works include:

- Matka (chamber opera, libretto by the composer, after Karel Capek), 1988–89
- Un jour d'été (children's theater, text by Pierre Garnier), 1996
- TagNachtTraumstaub (music theater, texts by the composer, Matthias Roth, Ulrike Schuster), 1999–2000
- Picardie orchestra, 1992
- Fadensonnen small orchestra, 1993
- but you in it bass clarinet, tuba, orchestra, 2001–02
- Ornithopoesie choral (text by Pierre Garnier), 1989
- Tender Buttons choral (texts by Matthias Roth, Pierre Garnier), 1997
- shaded piano, 1991
- String Trio – il pleut doucement sur la ville violin, viola, cello, 1989
- night black, the blue oboe, trombone, viola, cello, double bass, piano, percussion, 1990
- pigeon blue shadows mingled flute, guitar, 1990
- Et la pluie se – silent - organ, 3 percussion, 1994 (also version for organ, percussion, 2004)
- Dream herb flute, clarinet, violin, viola, cello, double bass, piano, percussion, 1995
- With traces of water and salt voice 11 players, 1987
- Rose (text by Ingeborg Bachmann), mezzo-soprano, piano, 1988
- The anti-Rose (text by Yvan Goll, Claire Goll) soprano, violin, piano, 1995
- Violent customer – Gibbongesänge (text by Ulrike Schuster), voice, tape, 2001
- I see the dream of water, music events for a mobile ensemble (text by Pierre Garnier), 2 voices, recorders (1 player), percussion, sculptures (by Daniel Depoutot), 1995
- couloir de la solitude tape, room installation (by Thierry Aue), 2000

Her work has been recorded and issued on CD, including:

- Klage Daniel Morgenroth, speaker; Friedrich Goldmann/Scharoun Ensemble (Aurophon/DZzM, 1992)
- verhalten, entgleiten, entfalten Reinbert Evers, guitar (Sächsische Tonträger/DZzM, 1994)
- Ach, es... Michael Vogt, tuba (RéR, 1994)
- Traumkraut; Tout est rêver; Fadensonnen; Taubenblaue Schatten haben sich vermischt; Ornithopoesie; Et la pluie se mit à tomber Georg Mertens, flute; Volker Höh, guitar; Accroche-Note; Les Percussions de Strasbourg; Roland Kluttig/Thürmchen Ensemble; Klaus Bernbacher/Kammerensemble Pro Musica Nova Bremen; Roland Hayrabedian/Musicatreize Marseille (Wergo: 6539, 1998)
- Zarte Knöpfe Michael Gläser/Frauenchor des Bayerischen Rundfunkchores (Deutscher Musikrat: 5, 1998)
- la faulx de l'été Katja Reiser, recorders; Tan Kutay, percussion (Carpe Diem: 16256, 1999)
- MOCCOLI Carola Schlüter, soprano; Ensemble Phorminx (EMI Classics: 26189, 1999)
- Unaufhörliche Schlaflosigkeit Michael Vogt, tuba (Villa Massimo, 1999)
- la faulx de l'été (second version) Carin Levine, flute; Stefan Blum, percussion (Radio Bremen, 2005)
- ZEBRA Lenka Zupkova, electric violin (Akademie der Künste Berlin, 2005)
