= The Flight into Egypt (Harbison) =

Composition by John Harbison

- by John Harbison
- Form: Sacred ricercar
- Commissioned by: Cantata Singers and Ensemble
- Text: Matthew 3:13-23 of the King James Bible
- Language: English
- Published: 1986: Associated Music Publishers
- Movements: one

The Flight into Egypt is a composition for solo soprano and baritone, chorus, and chamber orchestra by the American composer John Harbison. The work was commissioned by the Cantata Singers and Ensemble, of which Harbison was a former music director. The piece won the 1987 Pulitzer Prize for Music.

The composition is based on the Flight into Egypt in the Gospel of Matthew.

== Composition ==
The Flight into Egypt has a duration of 14 minutes and is composed in a single movement. The text of the piece comes from Matthew 3:13-23 of the King James Bible. Harbison described the composition in the score program notes, writing:

I began The Flight on an impulse stemming from a conversation with Craig Smith and Rose Mary Harbison about Christmas texts. Craig Smith mentioned the Christmas season counseling experience of Reverend Al Kershaw at Emmanuel Church, Boston, a time when need, isolation, and anxiety increases. We agreed that the darker side of Christmas needs representation, especially in a time of increasing distance between the privileged and the less fortunate. I have worked twice before with unedited Bible texts, in a narrative manner favored by Schuetz and Stravinsky, and I’m sure I will again. Without these pieces I would feel that a significant part of what I want to do as a composer would not have a voice. In this piece the subject matter gave rise to musical techniques: a frequent reliance on points of imitation, and the derivation of most of the music from the short motives stated at the outset. These are metaphors for the pre-ordained, inevitable aspects of the story. The harmony is more freely ordered, in the interest of a more flexible and compassionate rendering of the details of the narrative. The most expressive element in the piece is the continuity, which fuses the narrative into one continuous impression, both abstract and highly colored.

=== Instrumentation ===
The work is scored for solo soprano and baritone, SATB chorus, and an orchestra comprising two oboes, cor anglais, bassoon, three trombones (3rd doubling bass trombone), chamber organ, and strings.

== Pulitzer surprise ==
When it was announced that Harbison had won the 1987 Pulitzer Prize for Music, the composer wasn't even aware he had been nominated. In an interview with the Los Angeles Times, he said, "I had no idea anything of mine had been submitted. I was not even conscious of the possibility existing." The work had been submitted by Harbison's publisher, Associated Music, without the composer's knowledge. Harbison said of the event, "I guess you could look at the Zen of the situation: When you care the least about something, it's most likely to happen."
