= Oboe Concerto (Harbison) =

Oboe concerto by John Harbison

The Oboe Concerto is a composition for solo oboe and orchestra by the American composer John Harbison. The work was commissioned by the San Francisco Symphony for its principal oboist William Bennett. It was completed on October 18, 1991, and was given its world premiere by Bennett and the San Francisco Symphony under the conductor Herbert Blomstedt in 1992.

== Composition ==
The concerto has a duration of roughly 21 minutes and is composed in three connected movements:

1. Aria
2. Passacaglia
3. Fantasia

=== Instrumentation ===
The work is scored for a solo oboe and a large orchestra comprising two flutes (2nd doubling piccolo), two clarinets, alto saxophone (doubling bass clarinet), two bassoons, contrabassoon (doubling 3rd bassoon), two horns, two trumpets, two trombones, tuba, timpani, three percussionists, harp, and strings.

== Reception ==
The Oboe Concerto has been praised by music critics. Peter Dickinson of Gramophone wrote, "The Oboe Concerto [...] is unusual in creating a jazz personality, including real bent notes, for the soloist—notably in the bluesy section of the first movement from 3'15"—and big band effects in the finale. Harbison creates a series of decorative panels, almost Poulenc's technique (especially in the finale at 4'44"), skilfully laid out and often with an energy..." Allan Kozinn of The New York Times further remarked:

As modern oboe concertos go, Mr. Harbison's piece is less exotic than John Corigliano's and less dramatic than Elliott Carter's, but it has charms of its own. Mostly they were subtler than one expects a concerto's charms to be. In music that was alternately lyrical and rich in chromatic detail, Mr. Bennett was given room to stretch, but rarely to shine over the orchestra. The piece's most interesting movement was its finale, in which Mr. Harbison first embraces a 1940's style of jazz orchestration and then transforms it into his own symphonic style. But here again, Mr. Bennett's solo line was often a strand in the texture, not a shining ray.
