= Dwayne Croft =

American baritone

Dwayne Croft is an American baritone who has sung in more than 500 performances in 38 roles at the Metropolitan Opera.

He won the Richard Tucker Award in 1996.

He created the role of Nick Carraway in John Harbison's The Great Gatsby in 1999, that of Jaufré Rudel in Kaija Saariaho's L'amour de loin in 2000, and that of Robert E. Lee in Philip Glass's Appomattox.

His brother, Richard Croft, is also an opera singer of international renown.

A native of Cooperstown, New York he was married to the Spanish soprano Ainhoa Arteta, with whom he has a daughter, Sarah.

== Recordings ==
- 1999: En Concierto - Ainhoa Arteta and Dwayne Croft with the Orquestra Sinfonica de Castilla y Léon, Bragado Darman, cond. RTVE MUSICA 65126 - recorded live on August 9, 1999, at the Palacio de los Festivales in Cantabria, Spain

== Videography ==
- The Metropolitan Opera Gala 1991. Deutsche Grammophon DVD, 00440-073-4582
- James Levine's 25th Anniversary Metropolitan Opera Gala (1996), Deutsche Grammophon DVD, B0004602-09
