= Pechet Foundation =

American private charitable foundation

- Founded: 1960; 66 years ago
- Founder: Maurice Pechet
- Type: Private Grant Making Foundation
- Purpose: Arts and culture, Diseases and conditions, Education, Higher education, Human services, Poverty alleviation, Scientific research
- Location: Dover, Massachusetts, United States
- Origins: Family foundation
- Region served: United States
- Method: Donations and grants
- Key people: Pechet Family
- Revenue: $854,000 As of 2014
- Endowment: $5.4 million As of 2014

The Pechet Foundation is an American private charitable foundation founded by Maurice Pechet. The organization is based in Dover, Massachusetts.

== Background ==
The foundation was established in 1960, and is predominantly a grant-making organization. The foundation has been active primarily in the United States and has been particularly active in the Massachusetts area.

== Charitable giving ==
The foundation has funded numerous scholarships and research grants.

In addition the foundation has made donations and provided grants to such organizations as the Golden Foundation for the Arts, the Earthwatch Institute, Coast Guard Foundation, The Surfrider Foundation, The Boston University School of Social Work, The Cambridge Family & Children's Service, The Young Audiences of Massachusetts, Free Press Action Fund, The New Sector Alliance, The Cambridge Center for Adult Education, The Marlboro Music Festival, The Center for Middle Eastern Studies at Harvard University, The Breast Cancer Research Foundation, The Perkins School for the Blind, The Center for Blood Research (CBR), and the New England Conservatory.

The foundation has also provided funding for the Pechet Family Conference Room at The Joseph B. Martin Conference Center at Harvard Medical School.
