= Symphony No. 6 (Harbison) =

Symphony by John Harbison

- by John Harbison
- Occasion: commission of Boston Symphony Orchestra
- Text: "Entering the Temple in Nimes" by James Wright
- Composed: 2011
- Performed: January 12, 2012, Boston
- Movements: four
- Scoring: mezzo-soprano; orchestra

The Symphony No. 6 is a composition for mezzo-soprano solo and orchestra by the American composer John Harbison. The work was commissioned by the Boston Symphony Orchestra under the conductor James Levine. It was composed in 2011 and was given its world premiere in Boston on January 12, 2012, by the mezzo-soprano Paula Murrihy and the Boston Symphony Orchestra under the direction of David Zinman. The piece is dedicated "in friendship and gratitude" to James Levine, who would have conducted the premiere had he not retired from his post as the music director of the Boston Symphony Orchestra due to health concerns.

== Composition ==
=== Background ===
Harbison was affected by the premature retirement of the conductor James Levine from his longtime post at the Boston Symphony Orchestra; the composer thus reworked the symphony to reflect the sadness of the occasion. In an interview with the Boston Classical Review, Harbison remarked, "The character of it seemed to be... out of harmony with the sense of Mr. Levine's current situation where he's had to give up so much of what he wanted to do. I kind of went back and reconstructed the sequences of events and eliminated some things and put some other things in." Harbison particularly described the original draft of the first movement as the "least appropriate" for the event of Levine's departure, commenting, "It was a very self-assured, aggressive piece and I felt like I couldn't find the character of the piece moving away from that vantage point. I also felt like it was the kind of movement I had written before."

The reworked first movement is instead set to the text of "Entering the Temple in Nimes" by the American poet James Wright and is the only movement of the piece requiring the mezzo-soprano. Harbison wrote in the score program notes, "The concluding lines of the poem are rendered in terms which define much of the rest of the piece."

=== Structure ===
The symphony has a duration of roughly 25 minutes and is composed in four movements:

1. Con moto
2. Introduzione – Con anima – Grazioso
3. Vivo, Ruvido
4. Moderato cantabile e semplice

=== Instrumentation ===
The work is scored for a solo mezzo-soprano and a large orchestra comprising three flutes (3rd doubling piccolo), three oboes (3rd doubling English horn), three clarinets (3rd doubling bass clarinet), three bassoons (3rd doubling contrabassoon), four horns, three trumpets, two trombones, bass trombone, tuba, timpani, two percussionists, cimbalom (or prepared piano), harp, and strings.

== Reception ==
The symphony has been praised by music critics. Reviewing the world premiere concert, David Wright of The Classical Review wrote, "The program also included works by Weber, Beethoven, and Strauss, but, as intended, Harbison's symphony left the strongest impression of the evening." Wright added, "It is a masterpiece of mixed emotions, still showing signs of the confident, robust tribute to James Levine that Harbison intended to write, yet colored throughout by recollection of its wistful first movement—the one the composer says he changed the most in response to the news of Levine's departure." Matthew Guerrieri of NewMusicBox further remarked:

Harbison is, on the one hand, a composer of symphonies with a technique to match: the bend-but-don't-break tonality, the chain-of-custody working out of ideas, the cultivation of a monumental austerity in his orchestration. But he also seemed, in this symphony, to be more comfortable weighing musical options than flat-out asserting them. Those points in the symphony that seemed to spin off into a kind of considered ambivalence were not only the most engaging, but also cast the rest of the piece in a more fertile light. Maybe it was a reflection of the overwhelming sense of unfinished business surrounding Levine's tenure and departure, or maybe of something in the composer's own temperament, but Harbison's Sixth was hard to put a finger on in a most interesting way.
