= Marek Kopelent =

Czech contemporary composer (1932–2023)

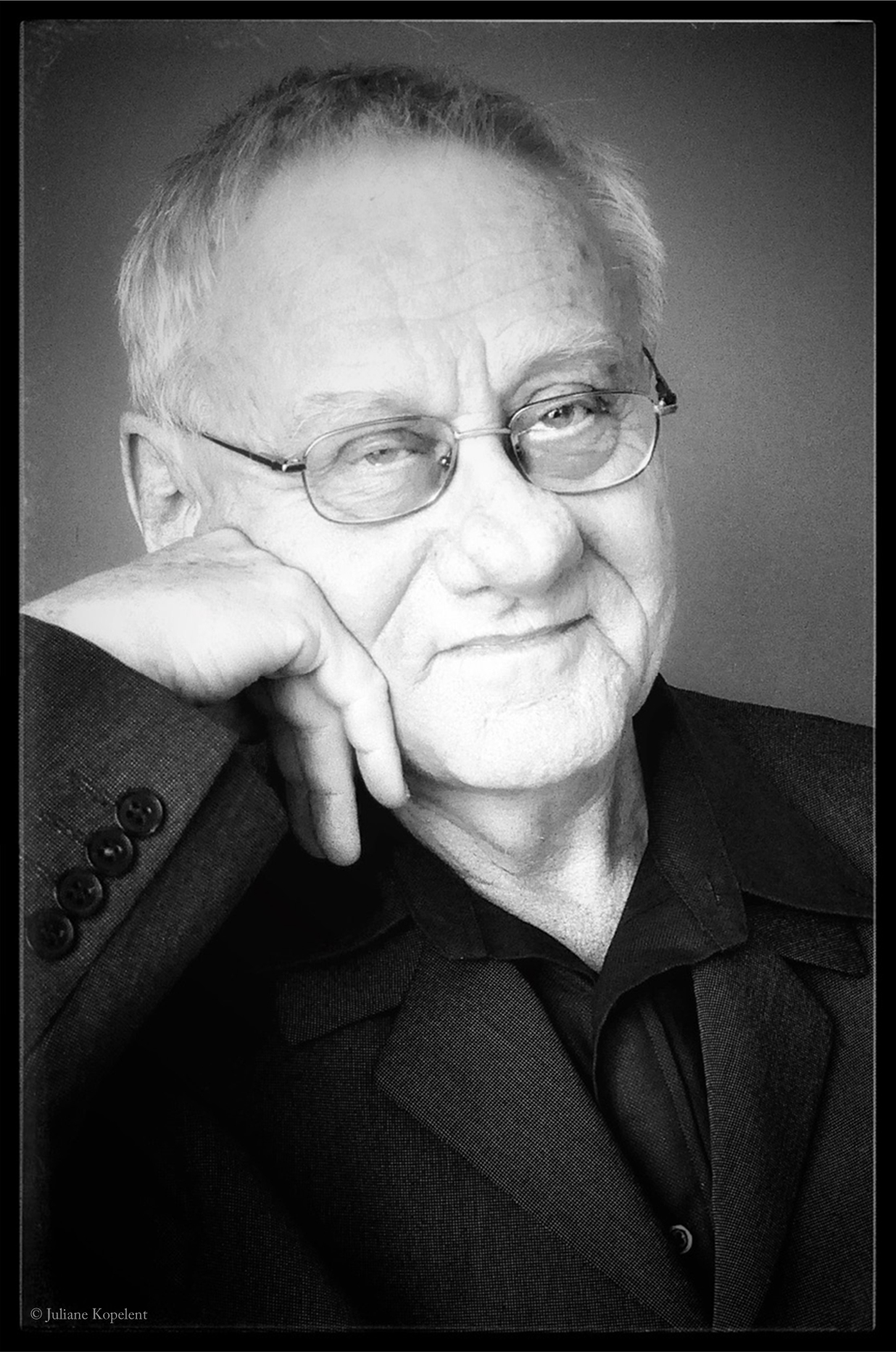
- Marek Kopelent (2012)
- Born: 28 April 1932; Prague, Czechoslovakia
- Died: 12 March 2023 (aged 90); Prague, Czech Republic
- Education: Academy of Performing Arts in Prague
- Occupations: Composer; Music editor; Academic teacher
- Organizations: Musica Viva Pragensis; Academy of Performing Arts in Prague; International Society for Contemporary Music
- Awards: Ordre des Arts et des Lettres; Herder Prize

Marek Kopelent (Czech: [ˈmarɛk ˈkopɛlɛnt]; 28 April 1932 – 12 March 2023) was a Czech composer, music editor and academic teacher, who is considered to have been at the forefront of the "New Music" movement, and was one of the most-published Czech composers of the second half of the 20th century.

After studies in Prague, he worked as a music editor. In 1959 he became interested in European avantgarde music and incorporated its developments in his style. He received international recognition when his String Quartet No. 3 was performed at festivals throughout Europe. He co-founded and directed a contemporary music ensemble in Prague, Musica Viva Pragensis, and composed chamber music for them. He studied further for one year in West Berlin on a scholarship by Deutscher Akademischer Austausch Dienst. When he returned, politics had changed to censorship of contemporary music; he lost his job, and his music was banned. For 15 years, he worked as an accompanist at a music school, and composed pieces for foreign commissions that he could not hear being performed. In 1989, he was able to return, and was appointed professor of composition at the Academy of Fine Arts in Prague. He was chairman of the Czech section of the International Society for Contemporary Music.

His compositions focus on chamber music, concertante music, and vocal music from solo songs to oratorios, based on a wide range of texts from medieval to contemporary. He received international awards.

== Life and career ==
=== Early life ===
Kopelent was born in Prague, Czechoslovakia, on 28 April 1932. His father František Kopelent was a lawyer, and his mother was a French teacher. The boy and his sister were schooled in French. From 1951 to 1955 Kopelent studied composition with Jaroslav Řídký at the Academy of Performing Arts in Prague. He followed the late-Romantic style of his teacher in an orchestral piece concluding his studies, Satanela. He then worked from 1956 as a music editor for contemporary music for the Supraphon publishing house.

=== 1959 ===
From 1959, Kopelent noticed increasingly the styles of the Second Viennese School and the European avant-garde movement. He read books such as Ctirad Kohoutek's New Compositional Theories of Western European Music (Prague 1962), listened at the Warsaw Autumn to music and met Czech composers, Witold Lutosławski, Krzysztof Penderećki and others, and had personal contacts with Western European composers including Luigi Nono and Karlheinz Stockhausen. He absorbed influences and reflected them in his works. The first piece to come to the attention of the musical world outside of Czechoslovakia was his Third String Quartet (1963), in large part due to the interpretation of the piece by the Novák Quartet which performed it throughout Europe. In the 1960s, Kopelent became well known in contemporary European music circles, with his compositions being performed at such festivals as Warsaw Autumn, Donaueschinger Musiktage, Wittener Tage für neue Kammermusik and the annual Darmstädter Ferienkurse.

=== 1965–1973 ===
From 1965 to 1973, Kopelent served as an artistic director of the contemporary music ensemble Musica Viva Pragensis, which had been founded by Petr Kotík in 1961. It was conducted by his colleague Zbyněk Vostřák, and for which he wrote several chamber pieces for the ensemble. In the Prague musical life of the 1960s, both the ensemble and the composers associated with it rose in importance, developing into the Prague Group of New Music, which brought together composers, musicologists and players, in opposition to the official Czech composers' association.

In 1969, Kopelent accepted a scholarship from the Deutscher Akademischer Austausch Dienst, which included a one-year artistic internship (Berliner Künstlerprogram) in West Berlin. In the meantime, the situation in Czechoslovakia changed following the Prague Spring, and New Music was less accepted. In 1971 Kopelent lost his job as editor, and his music was banned by the Czechoslovak government for twenty years. He was ostracized by the new Union of Composers, and his ensemble Musica viva Pragensis was not permitted by the authorities to pursue its concert activity.

=== 1976 ===
In 1976, Kopelent accepted a job as a piano accompanist for a children's dance schools in Radotin, where he remained for 15 years. During the 1970s he composed many pieces, a number of them for foreign commissions, but, as he could not leave Czechoslovakia, he was unable to hear their performances.

=== 1989 ===
After the Velvet Revolution in 1989, Kopelent became a music advisor in the office of president Váćlav Havel. In 1991 he was appointed professor of composition at the musical faculty of Academy of Fine Arts in Prague, a position he retained. He was a co-founder and chairman of the Czech section of the International Society for Contemporary Music, and was chairman of the Atelier 90 composers' association.

Kopelent was the organiser and a regular lecturer to International Composers' Summer Courses, held in Český Krumlov. Among his students were Czech composer Lenka Kiliç, recipient of a stabat mater at the national competition of young composers, Czech composer Markéta Dvořáková, First Prize in the 1993 national competition of young composers, Ukrainian composer Svitlana Azarova, and Latvian composer Ēriks Ešenvalds.

Kopelent died in Prague on 12 March 2023, at age 90, at the Motol University Hospital after a short illness.

== Compositions ==
Kopelent's works include five string quartets, oratorios and concertante works. They have appeared in a number of compilations of Czech composers. He was one of the most-published Czech composers in the second half of the 20th century.

His works include:

=== Orchestral and vocal orchestral works ===
- Satanela, symphonic poem for orchestra, based on a poem by Jaroslav Vrchlický (1954–55), Library of the Academy of Music
- Symphony (1982), Breitkopf & Härtel
- Pazdravení (Greetings), overture (1984), Breitkopf & Härtel
- Chléb a Ptáci (Bread and Birds), cantata for contralto, recitation, mixed choir and orchestra, text: poem by Jan Skácel (1957–62), Czech Music Fund (CHF)
- Laudatio pacis, by P. H. Dittrich (Germany), Sofia Gubaydulina (USSR) and Kopelent, oratorio for soprano, contralto, tenor, bass and recitation soloists, chamber choir, mixed choir and orchestra to texts by Jan Amos Komenský (Comenius) (1975)
- Legend – "De passione St. Adalberti Martyris", oratorio for recitation, mixed choir and orchestra to a Latin text of an ancient Bohemian legend (1981), CHF
- Ona skutecne jest (She Really Exists), for tenor, bass, recitation, mixed choir, children's choir and orchestra, text by Vladimír Holan (1985–86)
- Messaggio della bontà, oratorio for soprano and baritone, recitation, children's choir, mixed choir and orchestra (1987), Breitkopf & Härtel
- Lux mirandae sanctitatis, oratorio for soprano, recitation, mixed choir, children's choir and instrumental ensemble (1994), Supraphon (SU)
- Judex ergo for Requiem of Reconciliation, 1995
- ARÍÍJAh, for orchestra, (1996)
- Zastřený Hlas Nad Hladinou Klidu (A Dimmed Voice Above the Level of Calm), for trumpet and chamber orchestra (2000)

=== Concertante compositions ===
- Appassionato, for piano and orchestra (1970–71), Breitkopf & Härtel
- Sváry, for a group of twelve instruments and orchestra (1968), CHF
- A Few Minutes With an Oboist, concerto galante for oboe and chamber ensemble (1972), Breitkopf & Härtel
- Hrátky (Games), for alto saxophone and orchestra (1974–75), Breitkopf & Härtel
- Il canto de li augei, arias for soprano and orchestra to Italian lyrics by Renaissance poets (1977–78), Breitkopf & Härtel
- Libá hubda s sidovým motivem (Likeable Music With a Folkmotif, concerto for dulcimer and orchestra (1976), Breitkopf & Härtel
- Concertino for cor anglais and chamber ensemble (or orchestra) (1984), Breitkopf & Härtel
- Musique concertante, for cello, 12 cellos and orchestra (1991), SU

=== Music for chamber orchestra or ensemble ===
- Rozjímání (Contemplation), for chamber orchestra (1966), Breitkopf & Härtel + SU'
- Nénie (Nänie) with flute for the late Hana Hlavsová, for flute, nine female voices and chamber ensemble (1960–61), Schott Music Panton (PA)
- String Quartet No. 3 (1963), SU
- Quintet for oboe, clarinet, bassoon, viola and piano, Breitkopf & Härtel
- Pocta Vladimíru Holanovi (A Tribute to Vladimír Holan) for nonet (1965)
- String Quartet No. 4 (1967), Breitkopf & Härtel
- Zátiší (Still Life) for chamber ensemble (1968), Breitkopf & Härtel
- Intimissimo, music and a poem for chamber ensemble and tape recording (2 reciters) of a poem by Paul Fort (1971), Breitkopf & Härtel, Styrian Autumn
- Brass Quintet (1972), Breitkopf & Härtel
- Sonata for 11 stringed instruments (1972–73), Breitkopf & Härtel
- Rondo "Před příchodem roztomilých katů aneb trojí klanění naději" ("Before the Arrival of the Charming Executioners" or "Three Bows to Hope") for five percussion instruments (1973), Breitkopf & Härtel
- Toccata for harp, harpsichord and dulcimer (or el. guitar) (1974), Breitkopf & Härtel
- Triste a consolante for wind quintet of new or early instruments ad lib. (1977), Breitkopf & Härtel
- Musica lirica for flute, violin and piano (1978–79)
- Furiant for piano trio (1979)
- String Quartet No. 5 (1979–80), Breitkopf & Härtel
- Êtres fins en mouvement for 6 percussionists (1987), Breitkopf & Härtel
- Eines Tages, for 6 cellos (1987), Breitkopf & Härtel
- Romanze for 2 pianos (one tuned a quarter tone lower) (1991), SU
- Le petit rien, for piccolo flute and percussion (1991)

=== Music for solo instruments ===
- Pro Arnošta Wilda, for piano (1966), Breitkopf & Härtel
- Hallelujah, for organ (1967), Breitkopf & Härtel
- Bijou de bohème for harpsichord (1967), Breitkopf & Härtel
- Ballad for piano (1976), Breitkopf & Härtel
- Capriccio for trumpet (1976), Breitkopf & Härtel
- Jitřní chvalozpěv (Lob in der Frühe, Morning Eulogy) for organ (1978), Breitkopf & Härtel
- Canto intimo for flute and vibraphone (1963), Edition Modern, Munich
- Musique piquante for violin and dulcimer (or piano) (1971), Breitkopf & Härtel
- Toccata for viola and piano (1978), Breitkopf & Härtel
- Le petit rien, for piccolo and percussion (1991)
- Karrak for cello and piano (1991)
- Canto espansivo for clarinet (1993), SU
- Per Aminko for harpsichord (1998), Ritornel
- Cantus rogas for cello (1990)
- Der Gnade Freude (Radosti z milosti) for organ (1999)

=== Vocal music ===
- Písně rozhořčené (Angry Songs) for baritone and piano to poems by Petrarca (1956), CHF
- Miniaturní písně (Miniature Songs) for baritone and piano to ancient Japanese poems (1960–61)
- Snehah for soprano, jazz contralto (from a tape recording), tape recording and chamber ensemble (1967), SU
- Bludný hlas (Irrende Stimme, Errant Voice) for an actress, tape recording, chamber ensemble, film (35 or 16 mm) and light ad lib. (1969),
- Black and White Tears for solo voice (1972), Breitkopf & Härtel
- Nářek ženy (A Woman's Lament), melodrama for an actress, 7 brass instruments, 14 female voices and a children's choir, texts by the composer and M. Procházková (1980), CHF
- Vrh kostek (The Casting of Dice), for 4 reciters and tape, to a poem by Mallarmé (1980)
- Zjitřený zpěv (Excited Song) for baritone and brass quintet, text by Josef Hora (1982–83), CHF
- Agnus Dei, for soprano and chamber ensemble to texts by Martin Luther (1983), Breitkopf & Härtel
- Mon Amour, for soprano, tenor, chamber ensemble, and female choir, to texts by Marc Chagall (1988), SU
- Der Augenblick for soprano, flute and piano, to texts by Andreas Gryphius (1989), SU
- Le chant du merle au détenu, for mezzo-soprano, flute, accordion and piano, to poems by Jan Zahradníček (1991), SU
- Holanovská reminiscence for mezzo-soprano, recitation, choir, clarinet, trombone and piano, to poems by Vladimír Holan (1995)
- Cantus de dilectione filiarum Dei for 5 sopranos, baritone, and 3 trombones to texts by Thérèse de Lisieux (1998)
- Ze zápisníku Nataši H. (From the Notebook of Natasjy H., nine fragments for soprano and baritone, to texts by the mentally handicapped Natasja Hamouzová (2000)

=== Choral music ===
- Matka (Mother), frescoes for mixed choir with flute (1964), Pa and DGG (Deutsche Gramophongesellschaft) 11'
- Modlitby kamene (Stone Prayer) for a reciter, 2 mixed chamber choirs and 3 tom-toms, to a poem by Vladimír Holan (1967), Breitkopf & Härtel
- Žaloby (Klagen, Complaints) for mixed choir, trumpet and timpani ad lib. (1969), Breitkopf & Härtel
- Syllabes mouvementées (Syllables on the Move) for chamber choir (12 voices), (1972)
- Vacillat pes meus (I Stumble) for mixed choir to words from the Book of Psalms (1973), Breitkopf & Härtel
- Píseň kratochvilná (Amusing Song) for mixed choir, to a text by the Bohemian chronicler Lukáš Volný (1982)
- Regina lucis, for mixed choir to a text from the Czech Franus hymnal from the late 15th century (1985), Breitkopf & Härtel
- Cantus supplex for 12 vocalists to a medieval text (1966), Breitkopf & Härtel
- Alouette for 12 vocalists to the poem by Carmen Bernos de Gasztold (1990), SU
- Cantus pro defunctis, for medium voice (1994), SU
- Appels for 12 vocalists and 3 percussion players (1996)
- Cantus de navitate filii for medium (or low) voices (1997)

==== Music for children's choir ====
- Four songs to poems by Vítězslav Nezval, for children's choir and piano (1960)
- Dotty Ditties for children's choir, to texts by the composer (1967)
- Svítání (Daybreak), for a large children's choir (1975), SU
- Cantus simplex, for children's choir (1983)

=== Stage works ===
- Musica, or: A Story of Long, Long Ago That Angels Pass On From Age to Age, singspiel for soprano, 2 actors, flute, oboe and harpsichord, to a text by Bohumil Sobotka (1978–79), Bärenreiter

== Awards ==
In 1991, Kopelent was honoured by the French government, which named him a Chevalier des arts et des lettres. He received the Czech Classic Award in 1999, the Herder Prize in 2001, and a Czech State Award for his lifelong contribution to Czech music in 2003.
