= Symphony No. 2 (Harbison) =

Symphony by John Harbison

The Symphony No. 2 is an orchestral composition by the American composer John Harbison. The work was commissioned by the San Francisco Symphony for its 75th anniversary. It was composed in 1987.

== Composition ==
The symphony has a duration of roughly 23 minutes and is composed in four connected movements:

1. Dawn
2. Daylight
3. Dusk
4. Dark

=== Instrumentation ===
The work is scored for a large orchestra comprising three flutes (3rd doubling piccolo), two oboes, English horn, two clarinets, E-flat clarinet, bass clarinet, three bassoons (3rd doubling contrabassoon), four horns, four trumpets (1st and 2nd doubling piccolo trumpet), three trombones, tuba, timpani, percussion, harp, piano (doubling celesta), and strings.

== Reception ==
Reviewing a recording of the symphony with Harbison's Oboe Concerto, Peter Dickinson of Gramophone wrote, "...these two orchestral works provide greater scope and, given more dramatic space, are more convincing without losing any of Harbison's personal type of unpredictability." Vance R. Koven of The Boston Musical Intelligencer called it "a work of immense interest and power." He continued, "It is also a tour de force of orchestration, of which Harbison is a supreme master. From the snarling brasses and sawing strings of the second movement to the fluttering winds and massed percussion of the finale, to the astonishing clarity of texture in the first movement drawn from the full resources of a large orchestra, this symphony is a feast for the ears..."
