= Donald Sur =

American classical composer

Donald Young Sur (1 February 1935 – 24 May 1999) was a Korean American composer and musicologist. Although he is best known for his large-scale oratorio, Slavery Documents, most of his works were composed for small chamber ensembles. Sur was born in Honolulu and moved with his family to Los Angeles after World War II. He studied at the University of California and Princeton before spending four years in Korea researching ancient Korean court music. After receiving his doctorate from Harvard in 1972, he settled in Boston, Massachusetts, where many of his works were premiered and where he taught at several local universities, including Harvard, MIT, and Tufts.

== Life and career ==
Donald Sur was born in Honolulu in 1935 to parents of Korean descent. His paternal grandfather had emigrated to Hawaii in 1903 to work in the sugarcane plantations. His mother was a Korean picture bride. The first instrument he learned to play as a child was the ukulele; the second was the mandolin, which remained his favorite instrument throughout his life and figures in several of his scores. Sur's family moved to the mainland United States in 1951 and eventually settled in Los Angeles. He studied ethnomusicology for a year at UCLA as an undergraduate before transferring to Berkeley and studying with Andrew Imbrie, Seymour Shifrin, and Colin McPhee, who taught him Balinese composition techniques. Following post-graduate work at Princeton with Roger Sessions and Earl Kim, he spent four years in Korea (1964–68) doing research on Korean court music. On his return from Korea, he continued his post-graduate studies at Harvard University where he received a PhD in composition in 1972 with The Sleepwalker's Ballad, "an accompanied recitative for soprano and chamber ensemble".

After graduating from Harvard, he remained based in the Boston area for the rest of his life, combining his career as a composer with teaching at Harvard, MIT, Tufts, Wellesley and Boston University, and for a while running a small publishing company for composers of new music as well as organizing concerts of their works with John Harbison. March 1990 saw the world premiere at Symphony Hall, Boston of Sur's most famous work, Slavery Documents, an oratorio for 80 voices with a libretto by the composer. Sur's last works were Berceuse, a lullaby for violin and piano, which premiered at the Library of Congress in February 1999, and an a cappella setting of Shakespeare's Sonnet 97, which premiered at Boston's Jordan Hall in May 1999, three weeks before his death from cancer at the age of 64. In 2008, John Harbison, who described his friend as having "a unique ear for the incantatory power of percussion instruments", composed Cortège for six percussionists: In memoriam Donald Sur as a tribute to him.

== Style and compositions ==
Sur's musical style has been described as uniquely personal, "eclectic", and "unpredictable", and ranged from atonal and minimalist to neo-tonal. He sometimes used unconventional instruments in his scores such as banjos, bongo drums, Korean trumpets and even a skillet, conch shell, and bullwhip. His later music often incorporated musical references to a variety of styles and periods, including Baroque, Impressionist, popular dance tunes, and traditional Korean music. Two of Sur's works were on explicitly Korean themes: his 1991 Lacrimosa dies illa (Day of Tears) for chamber orchestra commemorating the March 1919 Korean uprising against Japanese rule; and his 1993 Kumdori Tansaeng (Birth of the Dream-Elf) for solo violin, chorus, and orchestra, commissioned by the Taejon International Exposition for Korean American violinist Sarah Chang. Sur also composed the score for Dai Sil Kim-Gibson's 1999 film Silence Broken, a documentary about the Korean "comfort women" of World War II.

=== Slavery Documents ===
Slavery Documents, an oratorio in two parts for 80-voice chorus, five soloists, and large orchestra (including an organ), is Sur's only large-scale work, and the one for which he is most remembered. A commission from the Cantata Singers and Ensemble, it premiered at Symphony Hall, Boston, on 23 March 1990, conducted by David Hoose. Sur wrote the libretto himself based on a variety of texts and documents relating to slavery, including passages from the Bible, Cotton Mather's The Negro Christianised, the 1831 confessions of Nat Turner, descriptions of slave punishments published by the American abolitionist Theodore Weld in American Slavery As It Is, pre-Civil War advertisements for runaway slaves, Negro spirituals, and Stephen Foster's sentimental ballad "Old Folks at Home".

The eclectic score, which Sur worked on for three years, was completed in December 1998 and marked a departure from his earlier predominantly atonal style. For the premiere, the 40-member (all-white) chorus of the Cantata Singers was supplemented with 40 African American singers from the Boston area. The soloists were Jane Bryden, soprano; Bonita Hyman, mezzo-soprano; Rockland Osgood, tenor; Gary Burgess, tenor (as Nat Turner); and David Arnold, baritone. Sur received a standing ovation from the audience at the premiere, but the critical reception was mixed. The Boston Globe critic Richard Dyer noted "some peculiar and unconvincing stresses in the setting of the text, some music that sounds merely bombastic, and some unidiomatic writing for the soloists in difficult registers," but found the piece emotionally powerful and concluded that "the flaws are not important in the context of an overwhelming achievement." John Rockwell, writing in The New York Times, was more critical, describing both the score and the libretto as artistically unconvincing. He echoed Dyer's comments about the setting of the music for the soloists but also found that Sur's "attempts to incorporate vernacular idioms and historical styles failed to resonate: they were just stuck onto the score, ornamentally, without development or conviction."

As part of the country's annual Liberation Day celebrations, Slavery Documents received its Korean premiere in August 1990 at the Seoul Arts Center, performed by the Korean Broadcasting System orchestra conducted by David Hoose and a chorus of 100 Korean singers. Sur amassed far more texts for his libretto than he was able to use, and at the time of his death in 1999 was working on a sequel that would incorporate some of them. As a memorial to Sur, the Cantata Singers commissioned his friend T. J. Anderson to compose a companion oratorio, Slavery Documents 2. Its libretto was based on texts from Loren Schweininger's collection The Southern Debate Over Slavery but incorporated one of the original sentences from Sur's work. The oratorios by Sur and Anderson were performed together by the Cantata Singers on 17 March 2002 at Boston's Symphony Hall. Part I of Sur's Slavery Documents received another performance in 2010 by the Atlanta Symphony Orchestra and the combined glee clubs of Morehouse College and Spelman College in a concert (also broadcast on National Public Radio) for Atlanta's Martin Luther King Day celebrations.

=== Other principal compositions ===
- Catena I, II, and III, for small ensemble (1961; Catena I revised 1970, Catena II revised 1962, Catena III revised 1976). Also known as The Book of Catenas, they were performed together for the first time by Collage New Music.
- Sleepwalker's Ballad, for soprano and chamber ensemble (1972). Composed for Sur's doctoral dissertation at Harvard and set to a text by Federico García Lorca, the work was premiered by soprano Bethany Beardslee and the Speculum Musicae ensemble conducted by Charles Wuorinen.
- Red Dust, for 29 percussionists (1967; revised for Western percussion in 1976). The work is based on classical Korean percussion and although lasting only 13 minutes, is divided into 20 movements.
- Il Tango di Trastevere, for four contrabasses (1977). Commissioned by the National Endowment of the Arts and dedicated to Donald Palma, the work premiered in Minneapolis, Minnesota played by the Times Square Basstet. It was later revised by Sur for a small orchestra of low-pitched instruments.
- A Neo-Platonic Epistrophe While Crossing Times Square, for piano trio and clarinet (1980). Premiered by Collage New Music, the work is sometimes performed together with his 1984 Satori on Park Avenue under the title New Yorker Sketches.
- The Unicorn and the Lady, for narrator and small ensemble (1981). The work was inspired by 18th-century hunting calls and The Hunt of the Unicorn tapestry series in The Cloisters museum. The narrator's text was written by American poet Barry Spacks. Each of the 12 movements is scored for a different combination of instruments.
- Satori on Park Avenue, for small ensemble (1984). Commissioned by the National Endowment of the Arts for Speculum Musicae and San Francisco Contemporary Music Players, the work is dedicated to Sur's longtime friend John Harbison.
- Sonnet 97, for a cappella chorus (1999). A setting of Shakespeare's Sonnet 97, the work was premiered by the Cantata Singers in Boston's Jordan Hall on 7 May 1999.
- Berceuse (Lullaby), for violin and piano (1999). This was the last work Sur completed. He attended its world premiere at the Library of Congress on 19 February 1999, three months before his death. The music was inspired by Walt Whitman's poem "Out of the Cradle Endlessly Rocking".

== Recordings ==
- Collage New Music Plays Donald Sur – Collage New Music, ensemble; David Hoose & Frank Epstein, conductors. Label: Albany Records

Released in 2009, this was the first (and as of 2011) only commercial recording of Sur's music. It contains Red Dust; Catena I, II, and III; The Unicorn and the Lady; Berceuse; Satori on Park Avenue; and A Neo-Plastic Epistrophe While Crossing Times Square.

== Sources ==
- Blotner, Linda (1983). The Boston Composers Project: A Bibliography of Contemporary Music. MIT Press. ISBN 0-262-02198-6
- Carl, Robert (March 1, 2010). "Review: Collage New Music Performs Donald Sur". Fanfare. Archived from the original on November 20, 2018 – via HighBeam Research.
- Dyer, Richard (March 18, 1990). "'Slavery' Time Donald Sur Gives Voice to a History of Shame and Heroism". The Boston Globe – via HighBeam Research. ;
- Dyer, Richard (March 24, 1990). "Out of 'Slavery,' a Stirring Triumph". The Boston Globe. Boston, MA. Archived from the original on March 21, 2016 – via HighBeam Research.
- Dyer, Richard (June 30, 1990). "'Slavery Documents' Goes to Seoul". The Boston Globe. Archived from the original on May 17, 2011 – via HighBeam Research.
- Dyer, Richard (May 25, 1999). "Donald Sur 1935-1999, Boston Embraced Composer's Works". The Boston Globe. Boston, MA. Archived from the original on April 15, 2016 – via HighBeam Research.
- Gehman, Geoff (31 October 1986). "The Audience Has A Part In This Piece Of Chamber Music". The Morning Call. Retrieved 1 December 2011.
- Harbison, John (2011). Liner notes for American Music for Percussion, Vol. 2 (New England Conservatory Percussion Ensemble; Frank Epstein, conductor). Naxos Classical. Retrieved 30 November 2011.
- McLellan, Joseph (February 22, 1999). "Sumptuous Strings". The Washington Post. Archived from the original on March 4, 2016 – via HighBeam Research.
- The New York Times (29 May 1999). "Donald Sur, 64, Eclectic Composer". Retrieved 30 November 2011.
- Oteri, Frank J. (26 January 2010). "Sounds Heard: Collage New Music Performs Donald Sur". NewMusicBox. Retrieved 30 November 2011.
- Paulk, Jimmy (16 January 2010). "Marsalis symphony is explosion of ideas at King celebration". Atlanta Journal-Constitution. Retrieved 1 December 2011.
- Rockwell, John (29 March 1990). "In Boston, a Chorus Presents a New Oratorio on Slavery". The New York Times. Retrieved 2 December 2011.
- Seo, Maria Kongju (2001). "Korean Americans and Their Music: Transcending Ethnic and Geographical Boundaries" in Yoshitaka Terada (ed.). Transcending Boundaries: Asian Musics in North America, pp. 79–112. National Museum of Ethnology (Japan)
- Titcomb, Caldwell (April 18, 2002). "New 'Slavery Documents' premiered by Cantata Singers". Bay State Banner. Archived from the original on March 4, 2016 – via HighBeam Research.
