= Symphony No. 5 (Harbison) =

Composition by John Harbison

The Symphony No. 5 is a composition for baritone, mezzo-soprano, and orchestra by the American composer John Harbison. The work was commissioned by the Boston Symphony Orchestra under the conductor James Levine. It was given its world premiere in Boston on April 17, 2008, by the mezzo-soprano Kate Lindsey, the baritone Nathan Gunn, and the Boston Symphony Orchestra directed by James Levine. The text of the piece is set to Orpheus and Eurydice by Czesław Miłosz, Relic by Louise Glück, and the Sonnets to Orpheus by Rainer Maria Rilke.

== Composition ==
The symphony has a duration of roughly 35 minutes and is composed in four movements:

1. Con fuoco
2. Andante cantabile
3. Grave
4. Lento

Though it was originally conceived as a purely orchestral work, Harbison decided to add vocal parts to the symphony at the suggestion of James Levine. The first two movements are set to the text of Czesław Miłosz's Orpheus and Eurydice, while the third and fourth movements are set to Louise Glück's Relic and Rainer Maria Rilke's Sonnets to Orpheus, respectively.

=== Instrumentation ===
The work is composed for solo baritone and mezzo-soprano and a large orchestra comprising three flutes (3rd doubling piccolo), three oboes (3rd doubling English horn), three clarinets (2nd doubling E-flat clarinet; 3rd doubling bass clarinet), two bassoons, contrabassoon, four horns, two trumpets, two trombones, tuba, timpani, three percussionists, piano, harp, electric guitar, and strings.

== Reception ==
The symphony has received a positive response from music critics. Reviewing the world premiere, Jeremy Eichler of The Boston Globe called it "an accomplished four-movement work that has extremely prominent roles for baritone and mezzo-soprano." He continued:

The vocal writing is sensitive and compelling across all four movements, and Harbison's orchestra, spiked with an electric guitar (played by composer Michael Gandolfi), is lean and concise, full of imaginative sounds and percussion effects, but most of all, extremely responsive to the imagery suggested by the poetry at hand. When Milosz's Orpheus descends into a surreal underworld of endless corridors and elevators, the orchestra descends with him; when Eurydice begins her journey back, we hear a haunting passage full of dissociated, zombie-like string writing. The other movements show a similarly keen responsiveness to text, especially as rendered by last night's fine soloists, Nathan Gunn and Kate Lindsey.

David Wright of the Boston Classical Review described the piece as "an arresting meditation on grief and the hereafter." At a later performance of the piece, Jeremy Eichler called it "an artful and moving work" and wrote, "The movements based on Glück and Rilke fill out the picture, the latter set with the two vocal lines in vivid canon. No detail feels incidental, every gesture speaks."
