= Symphony No. 3 (Harbison) =

Symphony by John Harbison

The Symphony No. 3 is an orchestral composition by the American composer John Harbison. The work was commissioned by the Baltimore Symphony Orchestra under the conductor David Zinman for the orchestra's 75th anniversary. It was given its world premiere on February 26, 1991, by the Baltimore Symphony Orchestra directed by Zinman. The piece is dedicated to Harbison's friend and fellow composer Christopher Rouse.

== Composition ==
=== Background ===
Harbison described his inspiration for the work in the score program notes, writing, "Among the first musical images were a carillon melody associated with the church of San Ilario, near Genoa, a long violin line with percussion accompaniment, and a drum pattern I associated with the Baltimore swing era hero, Chick Webb. The focus on percussion led naturally to the dedication to Chris Rouse, from whom I have learned much on these and other matters." The titles of the movements translate in English respectively as "disconsolate," "nostalgic," "militant," "passionate," and "exuberant."

=== Structure ===
The symphony has a duration of roughly 21 minutes and is composed in five connected movements:

1. Sconsolato
2. Nostalgico
3. Militante
4. Appasionata
5. Esuberante

=== Instrumentation ===
The work is scored for a large orchestra comprising three flutes (3rd doubling piccolo), three oboes (3rd doubling English horn), three clarinets (3rd doubling bass clarinet), three bassoons (3rd doubling contrabassoon), four horns, three trumpets, three trombones, tuba, piano, timpani, four percussionists, and strings.

== Reception ==
Reviewing the world premiere, Stephen Wigler of The Baltimore Sun gave the piece a mixed review, writing, "The symphony [...] doesn't contain anything that cries out to be remembered." Despite this criticism, he nevertheless added, "But it is beautifully put together and explores a broad spectrum of emotions." The symphony was criticized by Andrew Clark of the Financial Times, who—reviewing a performance by André Previn and the London Symphony Orchestra—wrote, "Harbison, a dyed-in-the-wool New England academic composer, uses orchestration to pump up a symphony that goes nowhere. American only in its occasional raucousness and smoochy rhythm, the music is too monotone in tempo and argument to grip the imagination. The LSO clearly did not believe in it."

Conversely, Alexandra Coghlan of the New Statesman called it "a good sampler of the composer's technique - rigorous structural architecture underpinning attractive textural effects." She continued:

With their programmatic titles - "Disconsolate", "Nostalgic", "Militant" - the movements lend themselves to evocation, an approach that works particularly well in second episode "Nostalgic", where disparate memories stir from each orchestral section - a folk tune from the woodwind, grudging remembrances from the brass - before becoming woven together in a colourful fog over sustained pedal points. "Militant" stages a vibrant fist-fight between tuned percussion and orchestra (...), before we cruise into the finale and a huge groove from the brass.
