= Milosz Songs =

Song cycle by John Harbison

Milosz Songs is a composition for soprano and orchestra by the American composer John Harbison. The work was commissioned by the New York Philharmonic for the soprano Dawn Upshaw and is set to the poetry of the Polish writer Czesław Miłosz. It was given its world premiere in New York City on February 23, 2006, by Upshaw and the New York Philharmonic under the direction of Robert Spano.

== Composition ==
=== Background ===
Milosz Songs was Harbison's first commissioned work for the New York Philharmonic and his fourth piece composed for the soprano Dawn Upshaw. It was also Harbison's second setting of the poetry of Czesław Miłosz, following his Flashes and Illuminations for baritone and orchestra. The score requires that the soloist be surrounded by a concertino group at the front of the stage. Harbison described its purpose in the score program notes, writing, "This concertino plays an important, varied role in every song. I thought of these players as satellites revolving around the path of the singer." Harbison subsequently composed a reduced version of the score for voice and piano.

=== Structure ===
Milosz Songs has a duration of roughly 30 minutes and consists of a prologue, eight movements, an epilogue, and a post-epilogue.

1. Prologue: from Lauda
2. A Task
3. Encounter
4. You Who Wronged
5. When the Moon
6. O!
7. What Once Was Great
8. So Little
9. On Old Women
  Epilogue: from Winter
  Post-Epilogue: Rays of Dazzling Light

=== Instrumentation ===
The work is scored for solo soprano and a large orchestra comprising three flutes (2nd doubling piccolo; 3rd doubling alto flute), two oboes (2nd doubling cor anglais), two clarinets (2nd doubling bass clarinet), two bassoons (2nd doubling contrabassoon), two horns, two trumpets, trombone, bass trombone, timpani, three percussionists, celesta, harp, and strings. The concertino group consists of six players: all three flutes, vibraphone (percussion I), harp, and celeste.

== Reception ==
Reviewing the world premiere, Anthony Tommasini praised Milosz Songs, writing, "[Harbison's] lucid and precisely wrought music complements Milosz's gripping words. Those who prefer the brasher kinds of contemporary music may find Mr. Harbison's score, with its audible textures and essentially tonal harmonic language, rather well mannered and soft-spoken. But quizzical things keep happening below the surface, and there are imaginative strokes in every phrase."
