= Symphony No. 1 (Harbison) =

Symphony by John Harbison

External videos
- John Harbison (on his Symphony No. 1), March 22, 1984, 4:20, Boston TV Digital Archive

The Symphony No. 1 is the first symphony by the American composer John Harbison. The work was commissioned by the Boston Symphony Orchestra and was composed in 1981. It was given its world premiere in Boston on March 22, 1984, by the Boston Symphony Orchestra under the conductor Seiji Ozawa.

== Composition ==
The symphony has a duration of roughly 24 minutes and is composed in four movements:

1. Drammatico
2. Allegro sfumato
3. Paesaggio: andante
4. Tempo giusto

=== Instrumentation ===
The work is scored for a large orchestra comprising three flutes (doubling piccolo and alto flute), three oboes (doubling English horn), three clarinets (doubling bass clarinet), three bassoons (doubling contrabassoon), four horns, two trumpets, three trombones, tuba, timpani, six percussionists, harp, and strings.

== Reception ==
Reviewing a 1989 performance by the Philadelphia Orchestra, Lesley Valdes of The Philadelphia Inquirer wrote, "Although it sometimes overstresses its points, the symphony has heft and atmosphere." She added:

The symphony does not lack for musical ideas, which appear to be organized tidily; some are presented with fine imagination. Atmosphere, more than dramatic import, appears the composer's suit; and for ideas and atmospheric effect, one most admired the work's inner movements. The second, a sort of scherzo, features the woodwinds in lissome questionings that are summarily answered by the horns. The andante offers the sort of shimmery-to-sustained string playing that calls to mind foggy landscapes a la Eugene O'Neill; its melancholy state was excellently indicated by conductor and ensemble alike.
