= What Do We Make of Bach? =

What Do We Make of Bach? is a composition for obbligato organ and orchestra written by the American composer John Harbison. The work was commissioned by Minnesota Orchestra, Seattle Symphony, and Northrop at the University of Minnesota. It was given its world premiere by the organist Paul Jacobs and the Minnesota Orchestra at the Northrop Auditorium on October 12, 2018.

== Composition ==
=== Background ===
Harbison conceived What Do We Make of Bach? as a meditation on both the music and lasting cultural influence of Johann Sebastian Bach. In the score program note, the composer wrote, "I thought of the piece as freely representing musical types found in Bach, reimagined in our still new century. The score takes note of some of these as they occur: Chorale-Variations, Fantasia on 'borrowed subjects' (actually Bach themes in retrograde), a pair of Cadenzas evoking Bach's improvisational side, Canzone (an instrumental aria), Antiphon, Chorale, and Fugue." The inclusion of obbligato organ was made at the suggestion of the conductor Ludovic Morlot.

Harbison wrote the piece in tandem with a book of the same name—a collection of portraits, essays, and program notes written throughout his career, which the composer described as "an extended comment on the piece, sharing with it a relationship to Bach's music both obvious and oblique."

=== Structure ===
What Do We Make of Bach? has a duration of roughly 17 minutes and is cast in three movements with intermezzi:

1. Chorale–Variations
2. Fantasia, soggetti prestiti
  Cadenza
  Antiphon
  Chorale
3. Finale: Fugue

=== Instrumentation ===
The work is scored for a solo organ and an orchestra consisting of two flutes (2nd doubling piccolo), two oboes (2nd doubling English horn), two clarinets in B♭ (2nd doubling bass clarinet), two bassoons (2nd doubling contrabassoon), four horns in F, two trumpets in C, trombone, bass trombone, tuba, timpani, harp, and strings.

== Reception ==
Reviewing the world premiere, the music critic Terry Blain of the Star Tribune praised the piece, writing, "Harbison's colorful writing for the organ in What Do We Make of Bach? was counterpointed by striated figurations in the strings, skewing perception of the great composer through the more agitated sensibilities of our own era."
