= Ainhoa Arteta =

Spanish classical and crossover soprano

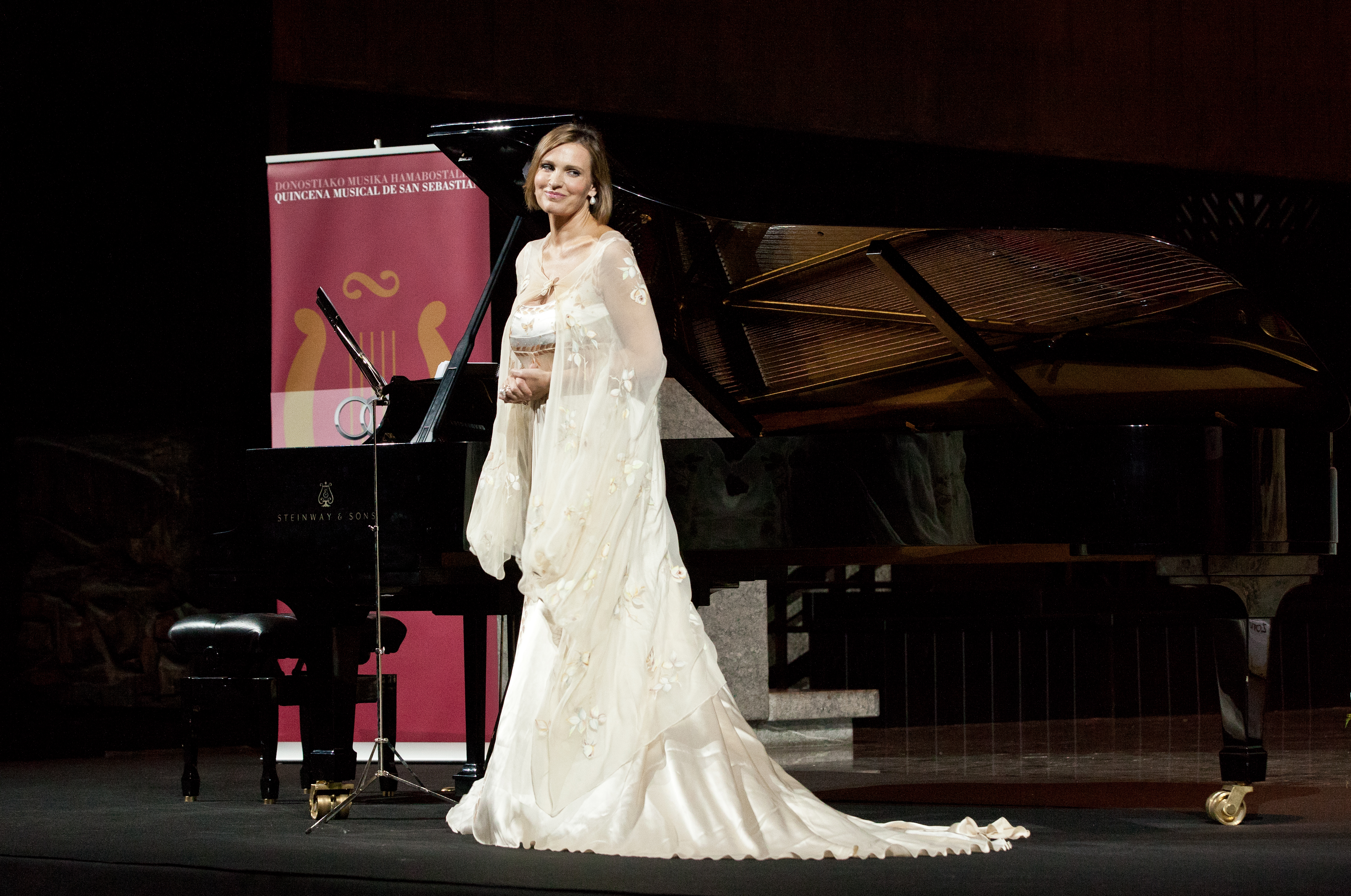
- Arteta at August 2013's Quincena Musical
- Born: Ainhoa Arteta Ibarrolaburu; 24 September 1964 (age 62); Tolosa, Gipuzkoa, Spain
- Occupation: Opera singer (soprano)
- Years active: 1993–present

Ainhoa Arteta Ibarrolaburu, better known as Ainhoa Arteta (born 24 September 1964), is a Spanish soprano.

== Personal life and training ==
Ainhoa Arteta was born on 24 September 1964 in Tolosa, Gipuzkoa. Her father, José Ramón Arteta, was founder and director of the Coral Eresoinka and she thus grew up in a musical environment. Aged 12, she entered the Conservatory of San Sebastián. The conductor of the orchestra there, Jacques Bodmer, former principal conductor of the Argentine National Symphony Orchestra, was a friend of her father and, having heard her sing, saw her take up study, after an exam, under Ettore Campogalliani in Italy, aged 18, before moving to New York with a grant from the Provincial Government of Gipuzkoa, to study at the Actors Studio. In 2003 she reworked her voice under Ruth Falcon.

She married baritone Dwayne Croft on 20 April 1998 with whom she had a daughter, Sarah. They divorced in 2003. She married showjumper Jesús Garmendia in secret on 1 July 2013 in Fuenterrabia. She gave birth to their son, Íker, in 2010. They separated in 2016.

In April 2021 she announced that she had to use a wheelchair temporarily after getting infected in February 2021 by COVID-19 during the pandemic.

== Professional career ==
Her operatic debut came in 1990 as Clorinda in Rossini's La Cenerentola with the Palm Beach Opera company in a production by the Tehrani producer Bijan Ahsefjah. She replaced the soprano who had cancelled a few days before the premiere and needed to learn the part quickly, since she had told the opera company in her enthusiasm that she knew the part, when in fact this was not the case. Her reviews were mixed: "Ainhoa Arteta and Maureen Taylor, as the wicked stepsisters, offered fairly bright, agile voices, but failed to project fully and missed opportunities to enliven their music", according to the Sun Sentinel. The following month, April, she was billed to appear in a production by Westchester Opera of Franco Leoni's L'Oracolo.

After winning the Metropolitan Opera National Council Auditions in 1993, she debuted at the Metropolitan Opera House in October 1994 as Mimì in La Bohème. Further Met performances include rôles as Violetta in La Traviata, the Countess Olga Sukarev in Giordano's Fedora with Plácido Domingo and Mirella Freni, Micaela in Carmen, Musetta in Bohème and Thérèse/The Fortuneteller in Poulenc's Les mamelles de Tirésias conducted by Levine.

Her first London performance was in 1999 at a concert with Plácido Domingo at the Barbican Hall organized by the Royal Opera House, Covent Garden. Her first performance at Covent Garden was in 2002 when she sang Musetta with Ramón Vargas as Rodolfo and Cristina Gallardo-Domâs as Mimì.

Her first appearance at New York’s Carnegie Hall was with Dolora Zajick and Plácido Domingo, with whom she works regularly with concert performances in several countries including Spain, the United States, Brazil, France, Turkey, England, Germany, Austria and Lebanon.

Other major venues for her opera performances include the Kennedy Center Opera House (Washington Opera), La Scala in Milan, the Teatro di San Carlo in Naples, the Arena di Verona, the Bavarian State Opera in Munich, Stopera (Netherlands Opera), Graz Opera, the San Francisco opera house and the Palacio de Bellas Artes in Mexico.

Her performance of Lieder, songs and zarzuela are of no less acclaim than her operatic performances. She has sung with the orchestra of Cadaqués conducted by Sir Neville Marriner, with Michael Tilson Thomas and the New World Symphony Orchestra.

She has performed and recorded with her former husband Dwayne Croft.

Among other awards, she has the Concours International de Voix d'Opera Plácido Domingo (Paris, 1993).

In December 2008, she gave a series of recitals accompanied by Malcolm Martineau.

In 2009 came her debut classical pop album La Vida.

== Recordings ==
- 1999: En Concierto – Ainhoa Arteta and Dwayne Croft with the Orquestra Sinfonica de Castilla y Léon, Bragado Darman, cond. RTVE MUSICA 65126 – recorded live on August 9, 1999 at the Palacio de los Festivales in Cantabria, Spain
- 1999: La Rondine – Magda – Washington Opera, Decca DVD
- La Vida 2009
