= Atlanta Chamber Players =

Founded in 1976 by pianist Paula Peace, the Atlanta Chamber Players (ACP) is a mixed ensemble of strings, winds, and piano, and has performed in more than 250 cities throughout the United States, Europe, and Mexico. In 2014, Paula Peace retired and pianist Elizabeth Pridgen took her place as the artistic director of the group.

The ACP's repertoire includes traditional classical masterpieces (Beethoven, Brahms) as well as contemporary works (George Crumb, Olivier Messiaen). ACP also has a long-standing commitment to performing the music of living American composers. The ensemble has premiered almost 125 works to Atlanta, Georgia audiences, including world premieres commissioned from composers such as Michael Gandolfi, David Amram, Anne LeBaron, three works from Pulitzer-Prize-winner John Harbison, and a 2014 commission from Adam Schoenberg.

The ensemble has appeared in numerous artistic, educational, and outreach concerts, as well as touring residencies and television and radio broadcasts. As Affiliate Artists at Georgia State University’s School of Music 1990–2006, ACP presented concerts, lectures and master classes. The group was in residence at Kennesaw State University from 1996–2003 and was the Candler Ensemble in Residence at Emory University from 1982–1987. In 1979, ACP was among the first ensembles nationally to participate in Chamber Music America’s prestigious Paul Residency Program.

To promote new chamber compositions in the Southeast, the Antinori Foundation and the ACP launched “Rapido! A 14-day Composition Contest” in 2009. Rapido! has expanded by adding partner ensembles in the Northeast, Midwest, Southwest, and West Coast, promoting up to 500 entries by composers of all ages and resulting in premiere performances in Boston, Chicago, Dallas, and San Francisco, as well as Atlanta. Robert Spano and the Atlanta Symphony Orchestra joined the Rapido team in 2012 by adding an ASO orchestral commission to the prize.

== Awards and honors ==
- ACP won the American Prize for Chamber Music Performance in 2014.
- Summer 2012 featured ACP in four performances at the International Chamber Music Festival of San Miguel de Allende, Mexico. Included was a world premiere of Michael Kurth’s Alallal for all seven musicians.
- The 35th Anniversary Season included national concerts in New York City’s Weill Recital Hall at Carnegie Hall and Boston’s Jordan Hall.
- Fall 2009 Rapido! A 14-Day Composition Contest debut Competition Concert was chosen as a “Top 10 Classical Music Performance of 2009” by the Atlanta Journal-Constitution.
- June 2006 - European concert tour to Paris, Rome and Lausanne, where the group presented premiere performances of Pulitzer Prize winning composer John Harbison's Songs America Loves to Sing, commissioned and recorded by the ACP.
- In 2005–2006, ACP was named “Best of 2005 in Classical Music” by the Atlanta Journal-Constitution and awarded the Phoenix Award by Atlanta Mayor Shirley Franklin for the group's “active commitment to the performing arts and contributions to enhance the city’s artistic reputation.”
- In 1998 the ACP recorded a series of eight hour-long live radio programs, which have been broadcast throughout Georgia's 14-station Peach State Public Radio Network. ACP's concerts also are broadcast on WABE 90.1 FM's Atlanta Music Scene, as well as on NPR's Performance Today.
- The ACP was twice featured on NPR’s Performance Today during live international broadcasts from Spivey Hall during the 1996 Summer Olympics in Atlanta. ACP's celebrated performance of Beethoven's Clarinet Trio is included on NPR's history-making CD, Spirit of ‘96.

== Discography ==
- Songs American Loves to Sing, Old & New Music for Winds, Strings & Piano, (MSR Classics) MS 1190, May 2007 Release
- Footeprints, Music of Arthur Foote, (ACA Digital) CM 20082, February 2001 Release
- Sacred Theory of the Earth, Music of Anne LeBaron, (CRI Recordings) 865, November 2000 Release
- Soirée Sweets, 18 Famous-and-Rare Chamber Works Spanning Three Centuries, (ACA Digital) CM 20063, May 1998 Release
- Conversations, A 20th Anniversary Salute to American Composers, (ACA Digital) CM 20038, April 1996 Release
