= Paula Murrihy =

Irish operatic mezzo-soprano

- Born: County Kerry, Ireland
- Education: DIT Conservatory of Music and Drama, Dublin; New England Conservatory; Britten-Pears Young Artist Programme; Opera studio of the Santa Fe Opera; Merola Opera Program
- Occupation: Operatic mezzo-soprano
- Organizations: Oper Frankfurt
- Awards: Anny Schlemm Prize
- Website: paulamurrihy.com

Paula Murrihy is an Irish operatic mezzo-soprano who has made an international career. A member of the Oper Frankfurt, she has appeared also in Europe and the US, including the Metropolitan Opera and the Santa Fe Opera.

== Career ==
Born in Tralee, County Kerry, Murrihy first studied at the Dublin Institute of Technology Conservatory of Music and Drama in Dublin, graduating with a Bachelor in Music. She studied further at the New England Conservatory. She took part in the Britten-Pears Young Artist Programme and the opera studio of the Santa Fe Opera. She also studied on a scholarship of the San Francisco Opera in the Merola Opera Program. She participated in Tanglewood in the 2003 Vocal Fellowship Program, appearing in the premiere of Osvaldo Golijov's opera Ainadamar, which she then also performed at Disney Hall with the Los Angeles Philharmonic.

Murrihy joined the ensemble of the Oper Frankfurt in 2009, where she performed the title roles of Bizet's Carmen and Der Rosenkavalier by Richard Strauss. Other roles there have included Polissena in Handel's Radamisto, the Second Lady in Mozart's Die Zauberflöte and Blanche in Prokofiev's Der Spieler. Title roles have included Purcell's Dido, Antonio Cesti's L'Orontea, Humperdinck's Hänsel, and Honegger's Judith. She performed the role of Kreusa in the German premiere of Aribert Reimann's Medea in 2010, alongside Claudia Barainsky in the title role, recorded live.

She made her debut at the Metropolitan Opera in New York City in 2017 as Stephano in Gounod's Roméo et Juliette and appeared at the Santa Fe Opera as Prinz Orlowsky in Die Fledermaus and as Ruggiero in Handel's Alcina. She performed at the Konzerthaus Dortmund in a cycle of Mozart operas conducted by Teodor Currentzis, as Cherubino in Le nozze di Figaro and as Dorabella in Così fan tutte.

In concert, she has performed Lieder at the Aldeburgh Festival, the Wexford Festival and at New York's Carnegie Hall, among others. She performed Bach's St Matthew Passion with the Orchestra of the Age of Enlightenment, and Hindemith's orchestrated song cycle Das Marienleben with the Real Filharmonía de Galicia. On 12 January 2012, she participated in the premiere of John Harbison's Symphony No. 6, a commission of the Boston Symphony Orchestra conducted by David Zinman. She took part in a 2017 recital with songs for voice, viola and piano in the Sendesaal of the Hessischer Rundfunk in Frankfurt, singing the two songs by Johannes Brahms and rarely performed works by Adolf Busch and Siegmund von Hausegger.

Murrihy was awarded the Anny Schlemm Prize for young female singers in 2011.
