= Collage New Music =

American classical music ensemble

Collage New Music is a classical music ensemble specialising in performance of works by 20th- and 21st-century composers. It was founded in 1972 by percussionist Frank Epstein who served as its Music Director until 1991. Since that time its Director has been the conductor David Hoose.

== The Ensemble ==
Collage New Music is a Boston-based ensemble. Since 2009, their main performing venue has been the Longy School of Music's Edward M. Pickman Concert Hall. Since its inception in 1972, Collage New Music has maintained a reputation for performing works by the great composers of the 20th and 21st century, such as Edgar Varese, John Cage, Yehudi Wyner, Olivier Messiaen, and Joan Tower. Collage opened the 2001 Festival of Contemporary Music at Tanglewood with a concert featuring composers long associated with the ensemble: Gunther Schuller, John Harbison, and Donald Sur. While honoring the music of the earlier 20th century, Collage has a longstanding tradition of commissioning new works by living composers and often providing many Boston premieres.

Collage also host a composer-in-residence each year that allows the ensemble to engage with young Boston composers, and attain a consistent working relationship with the community through various outreach activities. Collage now host annual composer competitions for high school students, fostering the development and progression of music.

Members

- Christopher Krueger, flute
- Jennifer Slowik, oboe
- Robert Annis, clarinet
- Craig McNutt, percussion
- Christopher Oldfather, piano
- Catherine French, violin
- Anne Black, viola
- Joel, Moerschel, cello
- David Hoose, conductor

== Commissioned Composers ==
Gunther Schuller, Joan Tower, John Harbison, Curtis K. Hughes, Martin Brody, Michael Gandolfi, Andy Vores, Richard Cornell, Lior Navok, Eric Moe, Richard Festinger, Marti Epstein, and Rodney Lister

== Composition Fellows ==
- Len Tetta, 2023-24
- Lingbo Ma, 2022-23
- Brian Sears, 2019-20
- Benjamin Park, 2018-19
- Joseph Sowa, 2017-18
- Yi Yiing Chen, 2016-17
- Stephanie Anne Boyd, 2015-16
- Katherine Balch, 2014-15

== Board of trustees ==
- Frank Epstein, President
- Geoffrey Peters, Treasurer
- Susan DeLong Clerk
- Michael Cucurullo
- John Kochevar
- Francoise Moros
- Doane Perry
- Ruth Scheer

Honorary Trustees

- Nicholas Anagnostis
- Charles Blyth
- Stephen Senturia

== Recordings ==
- Collage New Music Performs Donald Sur. Label: Albany Records (2009)
- Harbison: Mottetti Di Montale – David Hoose, conductor; Janice Felty & Margaret Lattimore; Collage New Music. Label: Koch International Classics (2005)
- Joan Tower (Track 5: Noon Dance performed by Collage New Music). Label: Composers Recordings (1994)

== Awards and nominations ==
- Nominated for the 48th Annual Grammy Awards: Best Small Ensemble for John Harbison: Mottetti di Montale
