= Cantata Singers and Ensemble =

American choir and orchestra

- Choir
- Cantata Singers
- Origin: Boston, MA
- Founded: 1964 (61 years ago)
- Music director: Noah Horn
- Concert hall: Jordan Hall, New England Conservatory
- Associated groups: Greater Boston Choral Consortium
- Awards: ASCAP/Chorus America Award for Adventurous Programming of Contemporary Music (1995)
- Website: www.cantatasingers.org

The Cantata Singers and Ensemble is a choir and orchestral ensemble located in Boston, Massachusetts. Founded in 1964 to perform and preserve the cantatas of Johann Sebastian Bach (a body of works largely unknown in Boston at that time), the group has since expanded its scope to include repertoire from the 17th century to the present day. Their performances have included semi-staged operas and a series of seasons centered on a single composer – Kurt Weill, Benjamin Britten, Heinrich Schütz, and Ralph Vaughan Williams.

== Music directors ==
Leo Collins	1964–1967
Richard Kapp	1968–1969
John Harbison	1969–1973
Philip Kelsey	1973–1975
John Ferris	1976–1980
John Harbison	1980–1982
David Hoose	1982–2022
Noah Horn	2022–present

== Commissioned works ==
Year	Composer	Title	Notes
1986	John Harbison	The Flight Into Egypt	winner, 1987 Pulitzer Prize in Music
1988	Peter Child	Estrella	
1990	Donald Sur	Slavery Documents	
1994	Andrew Imbrie	Adam	
2000	Andy Vores	World Wheel	
2002	T. J. Anderson	Slavery Documents 2	
2003	James Primosch	Matins	co-commissioned with Winsor Music
2006	John Harbison	But Mary Stood: Sacred Symphonies for Chorus and Instruments	
2007	Stephen Hartke	Precepts	co-commissioned with Winsor Music
2008	Lior Navok	Slavery Documents 3: And The Trains Kept Coming...	
2009	Andy Vores	Natural Selection	
2010	Yehudi Wyner	Give Thanks For All Things	
2014	Elena Ruehr	Eve	
2014	John Harbison	The Supper at Emmaus	co-commissioned with Emmanuel Music
2018	Peter Child	Lamentations	
