= Requiem of Reconciliation =

Collaborative setting of the Requiem Mass

The Requiem of Reconciliation was a collaborative work written to commemorate the 50th anniversary of the end of World War II. It sets the Catholic mass for the dead in fourteen sections, each written by a different composer from a country involved in the war. It was commissioned by the Internationale Bachakademie Stuttgart in Stuttgart, Germany, and first performed on 16th August 1995 by the Gächinger Kantorei, the Kraków Chamber Choir and the Israel Philharmonic Orchestra, conducted by Helmuth Rilling. A two-CD set documenting this performance was released in 1995.

== Sections of the work ==
1. Prolog: Hör (by Luciano Berio, Italy)
2. Introitus and Kyrie (by Friedrich Cerha, Austria)
3. Dies irae (by Paul-Heinz Dittrich, Germany)
4. Judex ergo (by Marek Kopelent, Czech Republic)
5. Juste judex (by John Harbison, US)
6. Confutatis (by Arne Nordheim, Norway)
7. Interludium (by Bernard Rands, UK/US)
8. Offertorium (by Marc-André Dalbavie, France)
9. Sanctus (by Judith Weir, UK)
10. Agnus Dei (by Krzysztof Penderecki, Poland)
11. Communio I (by Wolfgang Rihm, Germany)
12. Communio II: Lux aeterna (by Alfred Schnittke, Russia, left incomplete due to illness and completed by Gennadi Rozhdestvensky)
13. Responsorium (by Joji Yuasa, Japan)
14. Epilog: Inscription on a Grave in Cornwall (by György Kurtág, Hungary)
