= Carin Levine =

American classical flautist

- Born: October 19, 1951 (age 74); Cincinnati, Ohio, U.S.
- Education: University of Cincinnati – College-Conservatory of Music; Hochschule für Musik Freiburg
- Genre: Contemporary classical music
- Occupation: Flautist
- Instrument: Flute
- Years active: 1970s–present
- Website: carinlevine.de

Carin Levine is an American classical flautist.

== Life ==
Levine studied at the University of Cincinnati with Jack Wellbaum (flute) and Peter Kamnitzer (chamber music), then from 1974 at the Hochschule für Musik Freiburg with Aurèle Nicolet (flute), Klaus Huber and Brian Ferneyhough (Neue Musik). As an interpreter and lecturer (e.g. since 1996 at the Darmstadt Summer Courses), she is particularly committed to the flute literature of the present. In Bärenreiter-Verlag she publishes the series Contemporary Music for Flute.

1980-2000, Levine was a flutist in the Ensemble Köln. She plays in a duo with the violinist David Alberman (since 1995) and the percussionists Christian Dierstein. (b. 1965) and Marta Klimasara (b. 1975). Together with the oboist Peter Veale (b. 1959) and the bassoonist Pascal Gallois she founded the Aeolian Trio.

In 2008, she founded the Landesjugendensemble Neue Musik Niedersachsen, of which she is artistic director.
