= Maurice Pechet =

American physician and academic

- Born: February 10, 1918; Saskatchewan, Canada
- Died: March 5, 2012 (aged 94); Cambridge, Massachusetts
- Citizenship: American
- Education: Harvard University
- Known for: Scientist; Internal Medicine; Entrepreneur; Philanthropist
- Spouse: Kitty Pechet

Maurice Pechet (February 10, 1918 – March 5, 2012) was a professor, scientist, doctor, inventor, and philanthropist. Pechet made substantial contributions to the field of internal medicine, in particular in the domain of developing new antirachitic sterols to treat metabolic bone disease. He resided in Cambridge, Massachusetts for most of his life. At Harvard University, he was a student (earning both a chemistry PhD in 1944 and MD in 1948), professor, and doctor (Massachusetts General Hospital), and was involved with the campus for 70 years.

== Medical discoveries ==
Pechet and his research partners are credited with the discovery of the Pechet Factor Deficiency (OMIM:169200), a genetic disorder causing an abnormal blood clotting defect in a sister, brother and mother. Pechet and his research partners suggested that these persons lack a clotting factor that plays a role in the first phase of coagulation, following the activation of factor IX but before the activation of factor X.

== Publications ==
Pechet has been widely published in leading medical journals, such as the New England Journal of Medicine, the American Journal of Medicine, the Journal of Clinical Investigation, and the Journal of Pediatrics.

== Leadership roles ==
- Served as President of the Research Institute for Medicine & Chemistry, Cambridge, MA.
- Sat on Harvard Medical School's Board of Fellows.
- Sat on the Harvard University's Board of Tutors in Biochemical Sciences.
- Served as a director emeritus of Canadian Western Bank.
- Served as an Honorary Trustee of Immune Disease Institute, Inc.
- Sat as senior member of the Senior Common Room of Lowell House, at Harvard University.

== Personal life ==
Pechet was married to artist and teacher Kitty Pechet. She continues to reside in Cambridge, Massachusetts.

== Philanthropy ==
Pechet donated to a wide range of philanthropic causes. In 1960, he established the Pechet Foundation. The Pechet Foundation has given to scientific research, poverty alleviation, education, the arts, and environmental causes. The Foundation has made donations and provided grants to such organizations as the Golden Foundation for the Arts, the Earthwatch Institute, The Cambridge Family & Children's Service, The Young Audiences of Massachusetts, The New Sector Alliance, The Cambridge Center for Adult Education, The Breast Cancer Research Foundation, The Perkins School for the Blind, The Center for Blood Research (CBR), and the New England Conservatory.

== Business activities ==
Pechet was a director emeritus of the Canadian Western Bank.
