= Emmanuel Music =

Boston-based collective group of singers and instrumentalists

Emmanuel Music is a Boston-based collective group of singers and instrumentalists founded in 1970 by Craig Smith. It was created specifically to perform the complete cycle of over 200 sacred cantatas of J. S. Bach in the liturgical setting for which they were intended, an endeavor twice completed and a tradition which continues today. Over the years, Emmanuel Music has garnered critical and popular acclaim through its presentations of large-scale and operatic works by Bach, Handel, Schubert, and Mozart as well as its in-depth exploration of the complete vocal, piano, and chamber works of Debussy, Brahms, Schubert, Schumann, and Beethoven. In 2020, Emmanuel Music embarked on a new series of motet commissions and have since commissioned and premiered 21 new works.

Emmanuel Music selects vocal and instrumental soloists from a group of musicians who have maintained long-standing associations with the organization. The organization has worked with musicians at the local, national, and international levels. Its long-standing association with Pulitzer Prize-winning composer John Harbison has included collaborative musical projects.

Emmanuel Music has also collaborated with artists and organizations from other disciplines, including the Mark Morris Dance Group and stage director Peter Sellars. Emmanuel Music made its European debut in 1989 in Brussels at the Théâtre de la Monnaie and its New York City debut at Lincoln Center in 2001. The group was invited to perform at BachFest Leipzig in June 2024.

Emmanuel Music stages over fifty scheduled performances annualy. Among them, a few guest conductors have performed, including composer John Harbison, Seiji Ozawa, Christopher Hogwood, and Bach scholar Christoph Wolff.

Emmanuel Music has been the subject of numerous national radio and television specials, and has completed nine recording projects featuring works of Heinrich Schütz, John Harbison, and J. S. Bach. These projects include Bach Cantatas BWV 82 & 199 featuring Lorraine Hunt Lieberson on the Nonesuch Label (hailed as one of the Top CDs of the Year by The New York Times); the Mozart Piano Concertos and Fantasies with pianist Russell Sherman on the Emmanuel Music label, and the latest release on the AVIE label, Lorraine at Emmanuel. A project to record the complete Motets by contemporary composer James Primosch, long-time friend of Emmanuel Music, is in the works.

Craig Smith died in 2007 and composer John Harbison was acting artistic director as the search for a successor took place. Ryan Turner was named artistic director in 2010, with John Harbison continuing as principal guest conductor.
