= John Harbison =

American composer (born 1938)

John Harris Harbison (born December 20, 1938) is an American composer and academic.

== Life ==
John Harris Harbison was born on December 20, 1938, in Orange, New Jersey, to the historian Elmore Harris Harbison and Janet German Harbison. The Harbisons were a musical family; Elmore had studied composition in his youth and Janet wrote songs. Harbison's sisters Helen and Margaret were musicians as well. He won the prestigious BMI Foundation's Student Composer Awards for composition at the age of 16 in 1954. He studied music at Harvard University (BA, 1960), where he sang with the Harvard Glee Club, and later at the Berlin Musikhochschule and at Princeton (MFA, 1963). He is an Institute Professor of music at the Massachusetts Institute of Technology. He is a former student of Walter Piston and Roger Sessions. His works include several symphonies, string quartets, and concerti for violin, viola, and double bass.

Harbison won the Pulitzer Prize for music in 1987 for The Flight into Egypt, and in 1989 he received a $305,000 MacArthur Fellowship. In 1998, he received the 4th annual Heinz Award in the Arts and Humanities. He was awarded the Harvard Arts Medal in 2000. In 2006, a recording of his Mottetti di Montale was nominated for a Grammy Award in the Best Small Ensemble Performance category.

The Metropolitan Opera commissioned Harbison's The Great Gatsby to celebrate James Levine's 25th anniversary with the company. The opera premiered on December 20, 1999, conducted by Levine, with Jerry Hadley, Dawn Upshaw, Susan Graham, Lorraine Hunt Lieberson, Mark Baker, Dwayne Croft, and Richard Paul Fink among the cast.

In 1991, Harbison was the music director of the Ojai Music Festival in conjunction with Peter Maxwell Davies. He has served as principal guest conductor for Emmanuel Music in Boston. After founding director Craig Smith's death in 2007, Harbison was named acting artistic director. Harbison and his wife, Rose Mary Harbison, a violinist, ran the Token Creek Chamber Music Festival from 1989 to 2022.

== Partial discography ==
- Mirabai Songs / Variations (1987). Northeastern Records NR 230-CD. Performed by Janice Felty, mezzo-soprano, Collage New Music Ensemble, conducted by John Harbison — Rose Mary Harbison, violin; David Satz, clarinet; Ursula Oppens, piano. Tracks 1-6: Mirabai Songs, text from Mirabai Versions by Robert Bly. Tracks 7-10: Variations, for violin, clarinet, and piano. Track listing:
1. I. It's True, I Went to the Market
2. II. All I Was Doing Was Breathing
3. III. Why Mira Can't Go Back to Her Old House
4. IV. Where Did You Go?
5. V. The Clouds
6. VI. Don't Go, Don't Go
7. Variations i–v
8. Variations vi–x
9. Variations xi–xv
10. Finale and Epilogue
- The Flight into Egypt and other works by John Harbison (1990). New World Records 80395-2. Performed by The Cantata Singers and Ensemble, The Los Angeles Philharmonic New Music Group, and The Los Angeles Philharmonic Orchestra. Conducted by David Hoose, John Harbison, and André Previn. Tracks:
1. The Flight into Egypt, text from the King James translation of the story of the Flight into Egypt in the Gospel of Matthew
2. The Natural World: Prelude
3. Where We Must Look for Help, text from Robert Bly
4. On the Road Home, text from Wallace Stevens
5. Milkweed, text from James Wright
6. Concerto for Double Brass Choir and Orchestra: I. Invention on a Motif: Tempo giusto
7. II. Invention on a Chord: Cantabile
8. III. Invention on a Cadence: Molto allegro
- At First Light (1998). Archetype Records 60106. Performed by Lorraine Hunt, mezzo-soprano, Dawn Upshaw, soprano, Greenleaf Chamber Players, and Metamorphosen Chamber Orchestra, conducted by Scott Yoo. Tracks:
1. Due Libri dei Mottetti di Montale
2. Snow Country
3. Chorale Cantata
4. Concerto for Oboe, Clarinet, and Strings
- John Harbison: Ulysses' Bow / Samuel Chapter (2004). First Edition ASIN: B0002RQ35C. Tracks:
1. Ulysses' Bow ballet performed by Pittsburgh Symphony Orchestra and conducted by André Previn
2. Samuel Chapter performed by Susan Larson (soprano) and conducted by John Harbison
- The Reawakening, String Quartet No. 3, Fantasia on a Ground, Thanks Victor (2001). Musica Omnia om0110. Lydian String Quartet, Dominique Labelle, soprano.
- World Premiere Recordings: Violin Concerto, Recordare, Seven Motets (1997). Koch 3-7310-2-H1. Emmanuel Music, Craig Smith, conductor, Rose-Mary Harbison, violin.
- Sessions: Symphony No. 2; Harbison: Symphony No. 2, Oboe Concerto (1994). London 443 376-2. San Francisco Symphony, Herbert Blomstedt, conductor, William Bennet, oboe.
- String Quartet No.1/String Quartet No. 2/November 19, 1828 (1992). Lydian String Quartet, Yehudi Wyner, piano.
- Simple Daylight/Words from Patterson/Piano Quintet, (1999). Electra Nonesuch 79189-2. Boston Symphony Chamber Players, Gilbert Kalish, piano, Sanford Sylvan, baritone, Dawn Upshaw, soprano.
- Four Psalms/Emerson (2004). New World Records 80613-2. Cantata Singers and Ensemble, David Hoose, conductor.
- Mottetti di Montale (2005). Koch KIC-CD-7545. Collage New Music; David Hoose, music director; Janice Felty and Margaret Lattimore, mezzo-sopranos.
- Four Songs of Solitude/Variations/Twilight Music (2003) Naxos. Daniel Blumenthal, Jannine Jansen, Lars Wouters van der Oudenweijer, Bernhard Krug, Spectrum Concerts Berlin.

== Works ==
=== Operas ===
- Full Moon in March (1977) – chamber opera
- Winter's Tale (1979) – based on the play by William Shakespeare
- The Great Gatsby (1999) – based on the 1925 novel by F. Scott Fitzgerald, commissioned by the Metropolitan Opera

=== Ballet ===
- Ulysses (1983)

=== Orchestral ===
- Incidental Music from The Merchant of Venice (1971), for string orchestra
- Elegiac Songs (1974), for mezzo-soprano and chamber orchestra
  commissioned by the Fromm Music Foundation
- Diotima (1976)
  commissioned by the Koussevitzky Music Foundation in the Library of Congress
- Piano Concerto (1978), for piano and chamber orchestra
  commissioned by the American Composers Orchestra for Robert Miller
- Snow Country (1979), for oboe and string orchestra
  commissioned by Dr. Maurice Pechet, New England arts patron
- Violin Concerto (1978–80), for violin and chamber orchestra

External videos
- John Harbison (on his Symphony No. 1), March 22, 1984, 4:20, Boston TV Digital Archive

- written for Rose Mary Harbison
- Symphony No. 1 (1981)
  commissioned by the Boston Symphony Orchestra
- Concerto for Oboe, Clarinet and String Orchestra (1985)
  commissioned by the National Endowment of the Arts for the Toledo Symphony Orchestra, the International Chamber Soloists, the Wall Street Chamber Players, the Philadelphia College of Performing Arts, the Carnegie-Mellon University and the University of Michigan at Ann Arbor.
- Remembering Gatsby (1985)
  commissioned by the Atlanta Symphony Orchestra
- Symphony No. 2 (1987)
  commissioned by the San Francisco Symphony in celebration of the orchestra's seventy-fifth anniversary season
- Concerto for Double Brass Choir and Orchestra (1988), for twelve brass soli and chamber orchestra
  commissioned by the Los Angeles Philharmonic
- Viola Concerto (1988), for viola and orchestra
  commissioned by the New Jersey Symphony
- Symphony No. 3 (1990)
  commissioned by the Baltimore Symphony Orchestra
- David's Fascinating Rhythm Method (1991), for chamber orchestra
  commissioned by the Baltimore Symphony Orchestra
- Three City Blocks (1991), for concert band
  commissioned by the concert bands of the New England Conservatory, University of Cincinnati, Florida State University, U.S. Air Force, Ohio State University, University of Michigan and University of Southern California.
- Oboe Concerto (1991), for oboe and orchestra
  commissioned by the San Francisco Symphony
- Cello Concerto (1993), for cello and orchestra
  commissioned by Yo-Yo Ma and the Chicago Symphony Orchestra
- The Most Often Used Chords (1993), for chamber orchestra
  commissioned by the Los Angeles Chamber Orchestra
- Flute Concerto (1994), for flute and orchestra
  commissioned by Ransom Wilson and the American Composers Orchestra
- Olympic Dances (1996), for concert band
  commissioned by the College Band Directors National Association
- Partita (2001)
  commissioned by the Minnesota Orchestra
- Symphony No. 4 (2003)
  commissioned by the Seattle Symphony
- Crane Sightings (2004), for violin and string orchestra
  written for Rose Mary Harbison, the composer's wife
- Darkbloom: Overture for an Imagined Opera (2004)
  commissioned by the Boston Symphony Orchestra
- Canonical American Songbook (2005)
  commissioned by the Albany Symphony Orchestra
- Concerto for Bass Viol (2005), for double bass and chamber orchestra
  commissioned by the International Society of Bassists
- Milosz Songs (2006), for soprano and orchestra
  commissioned by the New York Philharmonic for Dawn Upshaw
- Rubies (after Thelonius Monk's "Ruby, My Dear") (2006)
  commissioned by Gerard Schwarz and the Seattle Symphony
- The Great Gatsby – Suite (2007)
  commissioned by the Aspen Music Festival and School
- Symphony No. 5 (2007), for mezzo-soprano, baritone soli and orchestra
  commissioned by the Boston Symphony Orchestra
- Mary Lou (Four Symphonic Memories of Mary Lou Williams) (2008)
  commissioned by the Pittsburgh Youth Symphony
- Double Concerto for Violin and Cello (2009), for violin, cello and orchestra
  commissioned by the Friends of the Dresden Music Foundation for the Boston Symphony Orchestra
- Closer to My Own Life (2011), for mezzo-soprano and chamber orchestra
- Symphony No. 6 (2011), for mezzo-soprano and orchestra
  commissioned by James Levine and the Boston Symphony Orchestra
- Crossroads (2012), for soprano/mezzo-soprano, oboe and string orchestra or oboe, two violins, viola, cello and double bass
- Koussevitzky Said (2012), for S.A.T.B. choir and orchestra
- What Do We Make of Bach? (2018), for organ obbligato and orchestra
  commissioned by Minnesota Orchestra, Seattle Symphony and Northrop at the University of Minnesota

=== Choral ===
- In Spiritu: Prayer (1955), for a cappella male-voice choir
- Ave Maria (1959), for a cappella S.S.A.A. choir
- He Shall Not Cry (1959), for S.A. choir and organ
- Five Songs of Experience (1971), for S.A.T.B. choir, two percussion and string quartet
  commissioned by the Emmanuel Episcopal Church, Boston for the Cantata Singers
- Music When Soft Voices Die (1966), for S.A.T.B. choir and harpsichord or organ
  commissioned by the Cantata Singers
- Nunc Dimittis (1975), for T.B. choir and piano
  commissioned by the Harvard Glee Club
- The Flower-Fed Buffaloes (1976), for baritone solo, S.S.A.T.B.B. choir and instrumental ensemble
  commissioned by the New York State Bar Association
- The Flight into Egypt (1986), for soprano, baritone soli, S.A.T.B. choir and chamber orchestra
  commissioned by the Cantata Singers
- Two Emmanuel Motets (1990), for a cappella S.A.T.B. choir
  commissioned by the Emmanuel Episcopal Church, Boston
- Ave Verum Corpus (1991), for a cappella S.S.A.T.B. choir
  commissioned by the Emmanuel Choir, Boston and the Ojai Festival
- O Magnum Mysterium (1991/92), for a cappella S.A.T.B. choir
  commissioned by Saturday Evening Brass
- Veni Creator Spiritus (1992), for a cappella T.B. choir
  commissioned by the Rosalind Denny Lewis Music Library at the Massachusetts Institute of Technology
- Communion Words (1994), for a cappella S.A.T.B. choir
- Concerning Them Which Are Asleep (1994), for a cappella S.S.A.T.B.B. choir
- Emerson (1995), a cappella S.A.T.B. double choir
  commissioned by the University of Wisconsin–Madison School of Music for their 100th anniversary (1995)
- Juste Judex (1995), for mezzo-soprano, baritone soli, S.A.T.B. choir and orchestra
  commissioned as part of the Requiem of Reconciliation
- Evening (Der Abend) (1997), for a cappella S.A.T.B. double choir
- Four Psalms (1998), for S.A.T.B. soli, S.A.T.B. choir and orchestra
  commissioned by the Israeli Consulate for the Chicago Symphony
- Psalm 137 (1998), for a cappella S.A.T.B. choir
- Requiem (1985–2002), for S.A.T.B. soli, S.A.T.B. choir and orchestra
  commissioned by the Boston Symphony Orchestra
- We do not live to ourselves (2002), for a cappella S.A.T.B. choir
- Abraham (2004), for double S.A.T.B. choir and two large brass choirs
  commissioned for the Papal Concert of Reconciliation in Rome for the Ankara Polyphonic Choir, London Philharmonic Choir, Krakow Philharmonic Choir and musicians from the Pittsburgh Symphony
- Charity Never Faileth (2004), for a cappella S.A.T.B. choir
- Let Not Your Heart Be Troubled (2004), for a cappella S.A.T.B. choir
- My Little Children, Let Us Not Love in Word (2004), for a cappella S.A.T.B. choir
  commissioned by the Cantata Singers
- But Mary Stood (2005), for soprano solo, choir and string orchestra
  commissioned by the Cantata Singers
- Umbrian Landscape with Saint (2005), for optional choir and chamber ensemble
  commissioned by the Chicago Chamber Musicians
- A Clear Midnight (2007), for T.T.B.B. choir and five strings
  commissioned by the Georgina Joshi Foundation for Indiana University and the Pro Arte Singers
- Madrigal (2007), for a cappella S.A.T.B.B. choir
  commissioned by the New York Virtuoso Singers
- The Pool (2010), for S.A.T.B. choir and piano
- Koussevitzky Said: Choral Scherzo with Orchestra (2012), for S.A.T.B. choir and orchestra: commissioned by the Boston Symphony Orchestra in Celebration of the 75th Anniversary of the Tanglewood Music Festival
- The Supper at Emmaus (2013), for S.A.T.B. choir, two oboes, bassoon, organ and string orchestra
- Never Time (2015), for jazz choir and jazz band
- Psalm 116 (2016), for a cappella S.S.S.A.A.A.T.T.T.B.B.B. choir
  commissioned by Chanticleer

=== Chamber ===
- Andante con moto (1955), for cello and piano
- Duo (1961), for flute and piano
- Canzonetta (1962), for bassoon quartet
- Confinement (1965), for twelve players
  written for the Contemporary Chamber Ensemble and Arthur Weisberg
- Four Preludes from "December Music" (1967), for flexible instrumentation: 3 instruments – flute, violin, oboe, clarinet
- Serenade (1968), for flute, clarinet, bass clarinet, violin, viola and cello
- Piano Trio (1969), for violin, cello and piano
- Bermuda Triangle (1970), for tenor saxophone, electric organ and amplified cello
  commissioned by the New York Camerata
- Die Kurze (1970), for flute, clarinet, piano, violin and cello
  commissioned by the New York Composer's Forum
- Snow Country (1979), for oboe and string quintet
  commissioned by Dr. Maurice Pechet
- Wind Quintet (1979), for flute, oboe, clarinet, horn and bassoon
  commissioned by the Naumburg Foundation
- Due Libri (1980), for mezzo-soprano and nine players
  commissioned by the New York Philomusica and Robert Levin
- Mottetti di Montale (1980), for mezzo-soprano and nine players or piano
  commissioned by New York Philomusica, the University of Oregon and Collage
- Organum for Paul Fromm (1981), for glockenspiel, marimba, vibraphone, harpsichord and piano
  commissioned by the University of Chicago
- Piano Quintet (1981), for two violins, viola, cello and piano
  commissioned by the Santa Fe Chamber Music Festival
- Exequien for Calvin Simmons (1982), for seven players
- Overture: Michael Kohlhaas (1982), for twelve brass
- Variations (1982), for clarinet, violin and piano
  commissioned by Frank Taplin for the Token Creek Festival, Wisconsin
- String Quartet No. 1 (1985), for two violins, viola and cello
  commissioned by the Cleveland Quartet
- Twilight Music (1985), for horn, violin and piano
  commissioned by the Chamber Music Society of Lincoln Center
- Fanfare for Foley's (1986), for twelve brass and two percussion
- Music for Eighteen Winds (1986)
  commissioned by the Massachusetts Institute of Technology
- String Quartet No. 2 (1987), for two violins, viola and cello
- Two Chorale Preludes for Advent (from "Christmas Vespers") (1987), for brass quintet
- Fantasy-Duo (1988), for violin and piano
  commissioned by the McKim Fund in the Library of Congress for David Abel and Julie Steinberg
- Little Fantasy on "The Twelve Days of Christmas" (1988), for brass quintet
- November 19, 1828: Hallucination in Four Episodes for Piano and String Trio (1988), for violin, viola, cello and piano
  commissioned by the National Endowment for the Arts for the Atlanta Chamber Players, the Da Capo Chamber Players and Voices of Change
- Fanfares and Reflection (1990), for two violins
  commissioned by Token Creek Festival
- Fourteen Fabled Folksongs (1992), for violin and marimba
- Prelude (1993), for cello and piano
- String Quartet No. 3 (1993), for two violins, viola and cello
- San Antonio (1994), for alto saxophone and piano
- Thanks Victor (1994), for string quartet
  commissioned by the Lydian Quartet
- Trio Sonata (1994), for three clarinets or three saxophones or oboe, cor Anglais and bassoon or string trio
- Fanfare for a Free Man (1997), for three oboes and three bassoons
- La Primavera di Sottoripa (1998), for mezzo-soprano and nine players
  commissioned by the Santa Fe Chamber Music Festival
- North and South (2000), for soprano/mezzo-soprano and seven players
  written for Lorraine Hunt Lieberson
- Six American Painters (2000), for flute/oboe, violin, viola and cello
  commissioned by the radio station WGUC Cincinnati
- Chaconne (2001), for flute, clarinet, violin, cello and piano
- String Quartet No. 4 (2002), for two violins, viola and cello
  commissioned by the Santa Fe Chamber Music Festival
- Cucaraccia and Fugue (2003), for four violas
  commissioned by the Token Creek Festival
- Trio II. (2003), for violin, cello and piano
  commissioned by the Harris Foundation, Chamber Music America and Meet the Composer for the Amelia Trio
- Songs America Loves to Sing (2004), for flute, clarinet, piano, violin and cello
  commissioned by the Atlanta Chamber Players and the Da Capo Chamber Players
- Abu Ghraib (2006), for cello and piano
  commissioned by the Rockport Festival for Rhonda Rider and David Deveau
- Deep Dances (2006), for cello and double bass
  commissioned by the Bank of America Celebrity Series for Rebecca Rice
- French Horn Suite (2006), for four French horns
  commissioned by the Massachusetts Institute of Technology
- Cortège: in memoriam Donald Sur (2008), for percussion sextet
  commissioned by the New England Conservatory Percussion Ensemble
- Diamond Watch (2010), for two pianos
  commissioned by the Massachusetts Institute of Technology and Priscilla Myrick Diamond for Peter Diamond and pianist Robert Levin
- Finale, Presto (2011), for two violins, viola and cello
- Sonata No. 1 (2011), for violin and piano
- String Quartet No. 5 (2011), for two violins, viola and cello
  written in honor of the 100th anniversary of the Pro Arte Quartet
- Crossroads (2012), for soprano or mezzo-soprano, oboe, two violins, viola, cello and double bass or oboe and string orchestra
- Invention on a Theme of William Shakespeare (2012), for solo cello, two violins, viola and double bass
- The Right to Pleasure (2013), for mezzo-soprano, two violins, viola, cello and double bass or piano
- String Trio (2013), for violin, viola and cello
  commissioned by Camerata Pacifica audience members
- The Cross of Snow (2015), for countertenor and four violas da gamba or two violins, viola and cello
  commissioned by William John Wartmann in memory of Joyce Frances Wartmann
- Presences (2015), for cello solo, two violins, viola, cello and double bass
  commissioned by Charles Felsenthal in memory of David Anderson
- Mark the Date (2016), for flute and piano
  commissioned by Asadour Santourian
- The Nine Rasas (2016), for clarinet, viola and piano
- String Quartet No. 6 (2016), for two violins, viola and cello
  commissioned by the Lark Quartet, Telegraph Quartet and Tanglewood Music Center
- IF (monodrama for soprano and ensemble) (2017), for soprano and eight players
  commissioned by Boston Musica Viva for the 50th anniversary of Boston Musica Viva, the Santa Fe Chamber Music Festival and the Chamber Music Society of Lincoln Center
- Sonata for Viola and Piano (2018), for viola and piano
  commissioned anonymously in honor of John Harbison's 80th birthday

=== Vocal ===
- Autumnal (1964), for alto and piano
- Cantata III (1968), for soprano, two violins, viola and cello
- Moments of Vision (1975), for soprano and tenor doubling handbells, alto recorder/sopranino recorder/bass recorder/alto krumhorn, lute/hurdy-gurdy/dulcimer and gamba
- Samuel Chapter (1978), for high voice (woman or boy) and six players
- Due Libri (1980), for mezzo-soprano and nine players
  commissioned by the New York Philomusica and Robert Levin
- Mottetti di Montale (1980), for mezzo-soprano and nine players or piano
  commissioned by New York Philomusica, the University of Oregon and Collage
- Mirabai Songs (1982), for soprano/mezzo-soprano and eight players or piano
- The Rewaking (1991), for soprano and string quartet (text of William Carlos Williams)
- December 1 (1995), for mezzo-soprano and chamber orchestra
- La Primavera di Sottoripa (1998), for mezzo-soprano and nine players
  commissioned by the Santa Fe Chamber Music Festival
- Il Saliscendi Bianco (1999), for mezzo-soprano and nine players
  commissioned by Collage
- North and South (2000), for soprano/mezzo-soprano and seven players
  written for Lorraine Hunt Lieberson
- Ain't Goin' to Study War No More (2003), for baritone, two trumpets, snare drum and string orchestra
- Milosz Songs (2006), for soprano and orchestra
- Closer to My Own Life (2011), for mezzo-soprano and chamber orchestra
- Crossroads (2012), for soprano or mezzo-soprano, oboe, two violins, viola, cello and double bass or oboe and string orchestra
  commissioned by the New York Philharmonic for Dawn Upshaw
- Seven Poems of Lorine Niedecker (2015), for soprano and piano
  composed in honor of the Tanglewood Music Center's 75th anniversary
- IF (monodrama for soprano and ensemble) (2017), for soprano and eight players
  commissioned by Boston Musica Viva in honor of the 50th Anniversary of Boston Musica Viva, the Santa Fe Chamber Music Festival, and the Chamber Music Society of Lincoln Center

=== Solo ===
- Sonata for Viola Alone (1961)
- Amazing Grace (1972), for oboe
  commissioned by oboist Philip West
- Four Occasional Pieces (1978), for piano
  written for André Previn, the Santa Fe Chamber Music Festival and in memory of John Boros, respectively
- Parody-Fantasia (1980), for piano
  adapted from December Music
- Four Songs of Solitude (1985), for violin
  written for the composer's wife, Rose Mary Harbison
- Four More Occasional Pieces (1987), for piano
  written for Joan Tower, Harriet Thiele, Rose Mary Harbison and Milo Feinberg, respectively
- Sonata No. 1 – In Memoriam Roger Sessions (1987), for piano
  commissioned by the National Endowment for the Arts for Robert Shannon, Ursula Oppens and Alan Feinberg
- Suite (1993), for cello
- Trio Sonata (1994), for piano or harpsichord or fortepiano or electric keyboard
  commissioned by the Massachusetts Institute of Technology
- Gatsby Etudes (1999), for piano
- A Violist's Notebook, Book 1 (1998–2000), for viola
- Sonata No. 2 (2001), for piano
  commissioned by G. Schirmer Associated Music for Robert Levin, to whom the work is dedicated
- A Violist's Notebook, Book 2 (2002), for viola
- Montale Sketches (2002), for piano
  after three poems by Eugenio Montale
- Ten Micro-Waltzes (2004), for piano
- Leonard Stein Anagrams (2009)
  written for Leonard Stein
- For Violin Alone (2014), for violin
  commissioned by 92nd Street Y
- Painting the Flowers Blue (2015), for violin
- A Bag of Tails (2016), for piano
- Nocturne (2018), for piano
  commissioned in honor of Linda Reichert’s tenure as Artistic Director of Network for New Music
- Passage (2019), for piano
- Suite for Solo Violin, on soggetti cavati (2019), for violin
