= Craig Smith (conductor) =

American conductor (1947–2007)

Craig Smith

Craig Smith (January 31, 1947 – November 14, 2007) was an American conductor who is considered a seminal figure in Boston's Baroque music revival of the 1970s and 1980s. At the beginning of his career, in 1970, he founded Emmanuel Music, a widely recognized organization that continues to focus on performances of the works of Johann Sebastian Bach.

== Biography ==
Born in Lewiston, Idaho, Smith began studying the piano at the age of four. His mother was a teacher and his father a carpenter. Although neither of his parents were working musicians, they constantly encouraged their children's musical education. For Craig that meant flute lessons in addition to the piano. With his parents and his brother Kent he traveled frequently throughout the Northwest to concerts as he was growing up. In high school, Smith was active in musical ensembles including the band and several choirs.

In 1965 Smith entered Washington State University, where he was first exposed to the production side of opera. He was, as he wrote at the time, hooked. After attending a 1967 summer program organized by the New England Conservatory (NEC), Smith moved to Boston, where he had been accepted for matriculation at the conservatory. He was mentored there in chamber music studies by the pianist Russell Sherman and violinist Rudolf Kolisch.

In 1968, though he was still a 21-year-old student, Smith was hired as choir director at Emmanuel Church. Two years later he founded Emmanuel Music at the church. The new group was a collective of singers and instrumentalists based in Boston and Cambridge, Massachusetts, created to perform the cycle of 224 sacred cantatas of J.S. Bach "in the liturgical setting for which they were intended", as Smith put it. The group later expanded into performing other literature, including operas from all periods and new works composed for it. Baroque music, however, remains the group's major emphasis to this day. It continues to be the resident ensemble of Emmanuel Church. Conducted until his death by Craig Smith, a number of other well-known conductors have made guest appearances over the years.

During his time with Emmanuel Music, Smith conducted hundreds of concerts of Bach's works, as well as the United States premieres of several operas by Handel and the world premieres of works by composer John Harbison. During the 1980s, Smith collaborated frequently with stage director Peter Sellars, including stagings of Mozart's trilogy of operas from librettos by Lorenzo da Ponte; also Handel's Giulio Cesare, several Gilbert and Sullivan operettas, and works by Bach, Weill, and Gershwin.

In 1988 Smith was invited to be permanent guest conductor at La Monnaie, a Baroque-era opera house and theater in Brussels. He remained there for three years. Soon after arriving he worked in the preparation, and conducted the premiere, of choreographer Mark Morris's adaptation of Handel's L'Allegro, il Penseroso ed il Moderato, an influential dance work which continues to be staged internationally. Smith also appeared as guest conductor at opera houses in Barcelona, Vienna, Paris, and London, among other cities, while in the United States he conducted at a number of opera houses, including the Lyric Opera of Chicago, the Boston Lyric Opera, the Houston Grand Opera, and the Handel and Haydn Society. He also served on the faculties of the Juilliard School, MIT, the New England Conservatory, Boston University, Pepperdine University, and the Tanglewood Music Center.

Smith died in Boston at the Beth Israel Deaconess Medical Center in Boston, Massachusetts, in 2007 of heart disease and diabetes-related kidney failure.
