= The Great Gatsby (opera) =

1999 opera by John Harbison

The Great Gatsby is a 1999 opera in two acts written by American composer John Harbison. The libretto, also by Harbison, was adapted from the 1925 novel The Great Gatsby by F. Scott Fitzgerald. Additional popular song lyrics were by Murray Horwitz. The opera was commissioned by the Metropolitan Opera in honor of music director James Levine's 25th anniversary with the company.

== Performance history ==
The Great Gatsby had its premiere performance on December 20, 1999. Conducted by Levine, the cast included Jerry Hadley, Dawn Upshaw and Lorraine Hunt Lieberson. The stage production was by Mark Lamos. The opera has been performed at the Met twelve times in two seasons. In 2000 it was produced at Lyric Opera of Chicago. The opera has received mixed reviews, some describing it as "undramatic and dull." It was also performed in the summer of 2012 at the Aspen Music Festival and School. It was performed at Seagle Festival in Schroon Lake, NY in the summer of 2018.

The first European performance was on 6 December 2015 at the Semperoper in Dresden conducted by Wayne Marshall.

== Roles ==
Role	Voice type	Premiere Cast, December 20, 1999 (Conductor: James Levine)	European Premiere, December 6, 2015 (Conductor: Wayne Marshall)
Jay Gatsby, a wealthy but mysterious young man	tenor	Jerry Hadley	Peter Lodahl
Daisy Buchanan, a young socialite	soprano	Dawn Upshaw	Maria Bengtsson
Tom Buchanan, Daisy's husband, formerly an athlete	tenor	Mark W. Baker	Raymond Very
Nick Carraway, Daisy's cousin, a stockbroker	baritone	Dwayne Croft	John Chest
Jordan Baker, Daisy's friend, a golfer	mezzo-soprano	Susan Graham	Christina Bock
George Wilson, garage mechanic	bass	Richard Paul Fink	Lester Lynch
Myrtle Wilson, George's wife	mezzo-soprano	Lorraine Hunt Lieberson	Angel Blue
Radio/Band Singer	tenor	Matthew Polenzani	Aaron Pegram
Tango Singer	mezzo-soprano	Jennifer Dudley	Jelena Kordić
Meyer Wolfshiem, a businessman	bass-baritone	William Powers	Matthias Henneberg
Henry Gatz, Jay's father	baritone	Frederick Burchinal	Tilmann Rönnebeck
Minister	bass	LeRoy Lehr	
