= Music of Connecticut =

Connecticut is a state of the United States in the New England region.

== Music institutions and venues ==
Following the Chicago Symphony, Boston Symphony and the New York Philharmonic, the New Haven Symphony Orchestra is the fourth-oldest orchestra in the country. It gave its first performance in January 1895.

The city of Hartford is home to Connecticut Opera (founded in 1942 and closed in 2009), the New Haven Symphony Orchestra (founded in 1934), The Hartford Chorale (founded in 1972) and the Hartford Conservatory, an institution of music education. The Yale Summer School of Music hosts the Norfolk Chamber Music Festival, a major music festival devoted to chamber music. There is also a Connecticut Early Music Festival. Norwalk is home to the Norwalk Youth Symphony.

Major performance venues in Connecticut include the Oakdale Theater in Wallingford, Westville Music Bowl in New Haven, The Ridgefield Playhouse, The El' N' Gee Club in New London, The Bushnell Center for the Performing Arts in Hartford, The Klein Memorial Auditorium in Bridgeport, Xfinity Theatre in Hartford (formerly known as The Meadows), the Palace Theater in Waterbury, the Regina A. Quick Center for the Arts at Fairfield University, the Jorgensen Center for the Performing Arts at the University of Connecticut in Storrs, Toad's Place in New Haven, The Cellar in Hamden (formerly known as The Space), The Ü Party in Downtown New Haven, and the Stamford Center for the Arts.

== Musicians from Connecticut ==
- The Alternate Routes, Bridgeport band signed to Vanguard Records
- Apathy, rapper
- A Will Away, Naugatuck alternative rock band signed to Triple Crown Records
- Barefoot Truth, indie rock band, founded in Mystic
- Michael Bolton, crooner, has 2 #1 Hot 100 hits, including "How Am I Supposed to Live Without You" in 1989.
- Bronze Radio Return, indie/roots rock, revival rock sextet from Hartford
- The Carpenters had 3 #1 Billboard Hot 100 hits, including "(They Long to Be) Close to You" in 1970
- Chris Carrabba, lead singer and guitarist of the band Dashboard Confessional, raised in West Hartford
- Bob Carter, jazz bassist and arranger, born in New Haven
- Dick Cary, jazz musician, born in Hartford
- Cassie, R&B singer
- Currents (band), Progressive Metal/metalcore Band from Newtown.
- Thomas Chapin, composer, saxophonist/multi-instrumentalist, born in Manchester
- Ed Cherry, jazz guitarist, born in New Haven
- Clint Conley, bassist/singer for Mission of Burma
- Rivers Cuomo, lead singer and lead guitarist of Weezer, was raised in Pomfret Center and Storrs
- Dead by Wednesday, New Haven Heavy Metal, Conbat Records
- Deep Banana Blackout, funk band from Fairfield
- Doozer, pop-punk band
- Emmure, a metalcore band originally from New Fairfield
- Eileen Farrell, singer
- Fates Warning, progressive Metal Band
- Felly, indie artist, singer, songwriter, and record producer
- The Fifth Estate, rock and roll band, from Stamford, presently out of Wallingford
- Roger Glover, songwriter and bassist for Deep Purple, lives in Greenwich
- Tom Guerra, songwriter and guitarist, lives in Hartford
- Hatebreed, hardcore band
- Have a Nice Life, indie rock band
- High Adventure, fan rock
- Hot Rod Circuit, rock band
- Christopher Houlihan, concert organist
- Charles Ives, classical music composer and music innovator from Danbury
- Bernard Jackson, singer and bassist for the 80's hit R&B group Surface, from Stamford
- Joey Batts & Them, alternative hip hop
- Hilton Jefferson, jazz alto saxophonist
- Kimono Draggin', an indie rock band
- Al Klink, swing jazz tenor saxophonist, born in Danbury
- Landing, ambient rock
- Bernie Leighton, jazz pianist, born in West Haven
- Liege Lord, power metal
- Life In Your Way, hardcore band
- Mambo Sons, straight ahead rock and roll band from Hartford
- Magik Markers, noise rock band from Hartford
- Mates of State, formed in Lawrence, KS, the band members now live in Stratford
- John Mayer, born in Bridgeport
- Mark McGrath, lead singer of Sugar Ray, born in Hartford
- Hal McIntyre, jazz artist, born in Cromwell
- MGMT, indie rock & synthpop
- Miracle Legion, alternative rock band, founded in New Haven
- Moby, singer and electronic musician, was raised in Darien
- Thurston Moore, singer and guitarist for Sonic Youth, raised in Bethel
- Joe Morris, jazz guitarist, bassist, and composer
- Obsession, power metal band
- Liz Phair, singer/songwriter, born in New Haven
- Derek Piotr, vocalist and producer
- Rosa Ponselle, singer
- Jeff Porcaro, drummer, songwriter, producer, best known for his work with Toto.
- Joe Porcaro, session drummer, percussionist.
- Mike Porcaro, bassist, songwriter, best known for his work with Toto.
- Steve Porcaro, keyboardist, songwriter, producer, best known for his work with Toto.
- Quincy Porter, classical composer
- Redhot & Blue, vocal jazz group
- Sacred Oath, metal band
- Saint Bernadette, indie rock, Exotic Recordings founders, based in Bridgeport
- St. Johnny, alternative rock band from Hartford
- Blues Saraceno, instrumental guitarist
- John Scofield, jazz guitarist
- Horace Silver, jazz pianist and composer, born in Norwalk
- Paul Simon and his wife Edie Brickell live in New Canaan
- The Skinny Boys, hip hop group during the Golden Age, from Bridgeport
- Sorority Noise
- Spring Heeled Jack U.S.A., third wave ska band
- Steelheart, hard rock band from Norwalk
- Stezo, rapper and producer
- Al Tinney, jazz pianist, born in Ansonia
- Ed Toth, drummer for Vertical Horizon, Doobie Brothers, raised in East Lyme
- Peter Tork, bass, keyboards, & vocals for the Monkees, raised in Storrs
- Tune-Yards
- Vatican Commandos, hardcore band from Darien
- Chris Webby, rapper
- Dick Wellstood, jazz stride pianist, born in Greenwich
- The World Is a Beautiful Place & I Am No Longer Afraid to Die, indie rock band
- Brian Yale, bassist for Matchbox 20, raised in Orange, attended high school in Woodbridge

== See also ==
- Indigenous music of North America#Eastern Woodlands
