= New Haven Symphony Orchestra =

Symphony orchestra in Connecticut, U.S.

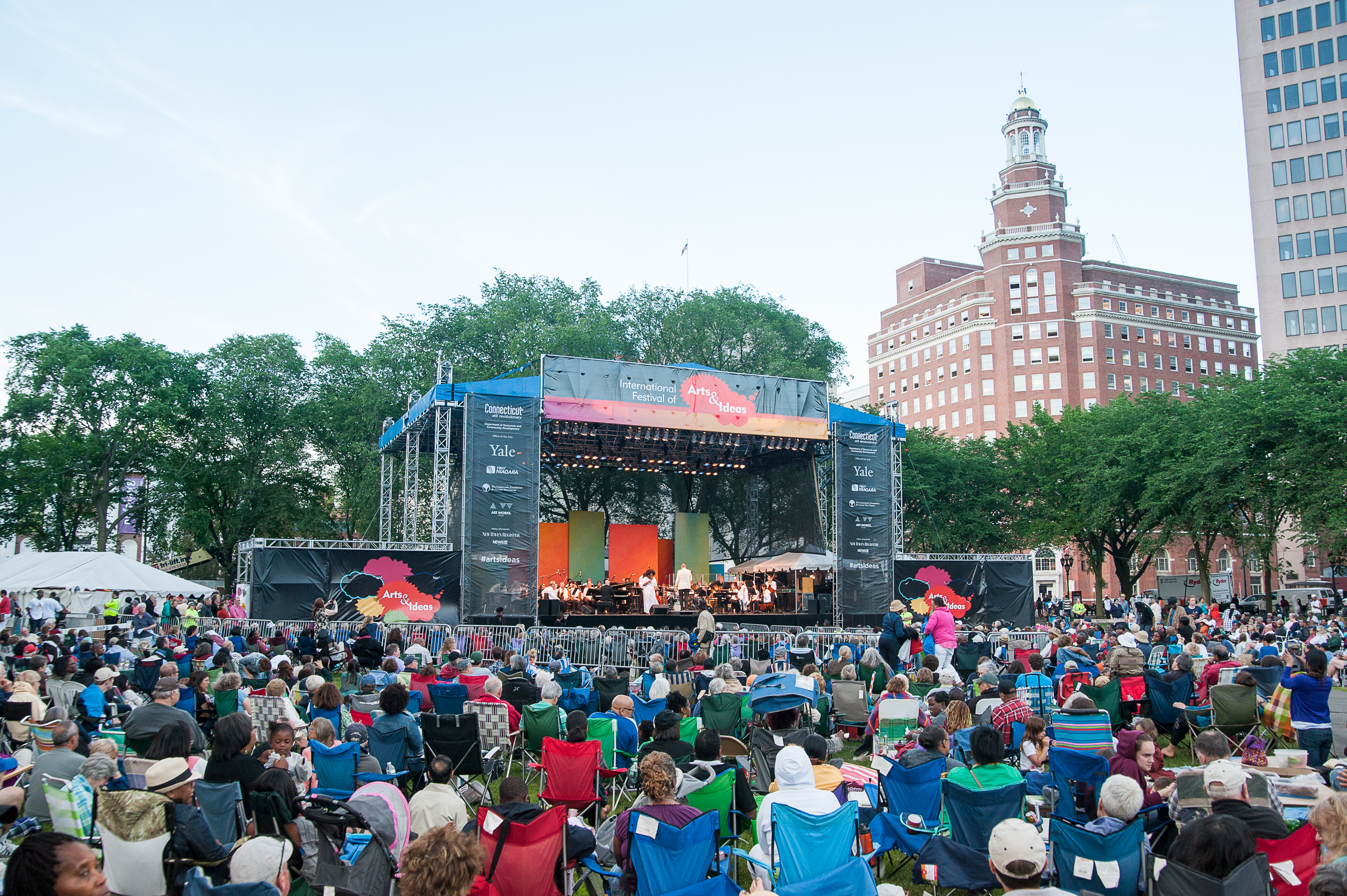
NHSO performing with Dianne Reeves on the New Haven Green. June 2014 at the International Festival of Arts and Ideas.

The New Haven Symphony Orchestra is an American symphony orchestra based in New Haven, Connecticut. The New Haven Symphony Orchestra gave its first concert on January 25, 1894, and is the fourth-oldest orchestra in the United States. Today, the orchestra is made up of over 65 professionals, many of whom live and work in the Greater New Haven area. The NHSO is currently directed by Music Director Perry So.

== History ==
The NHSO was founded in 1894 by Morris Steinert (a music merchant) and Horatio William Parker (the head of Yale University's Department of Music). Many of the earliest American symphony orchestras were based in large cities like Boston or New York City, yet Steinert and Parker were able to form a viable orchestra made up of local musicians in a relatively smaller city. The original members of the NHSO were mainly German-Americans seeking to continue the orchestral traditions of their native country in the United States, where classical music was less appreciated at the time.

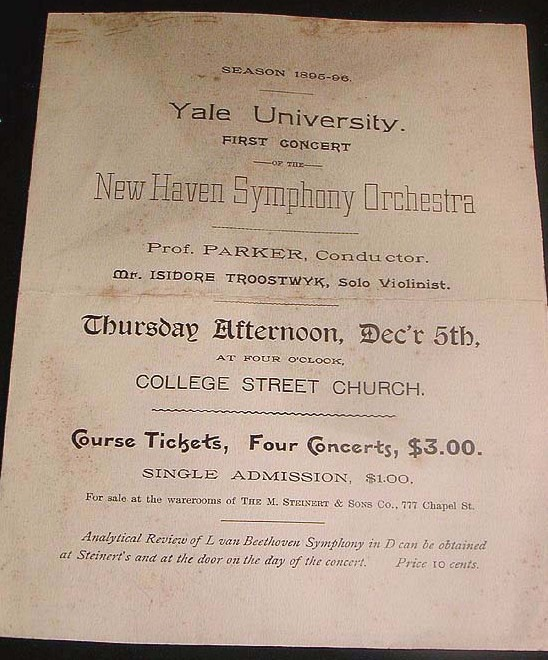
Cover of program for the orchestra's first concert in 1895

The first performance of the NHSO took place January 25, 1895, at a now-defunct theater on Chapel Street in New Haven near the present-day Union League Café. The program included works by Bach, Beethoven, Mendelssohn, and Schubert, as well as two solos performed by Isidore Troostwyk, a Dutch-born violinist who had recently arrived as a professor of music at Yale. Troostwyk served as concertmaster of the new orchestra.

In its early years, the NHSO was closely tied to Yale University, drawing its conductors from the School of Music faculty and serving on occasion as a laboratory for Yale composers and performers. The university also offered financial and organizational support. Before the construction of Woolsey Hall in 1901, the orchestra performed in various local venues including the Hyperion Theater, Alumni Hall (later replaced by Wright Hall, on Elm St) and College Street Hall (on the site of the present Palace Theater)

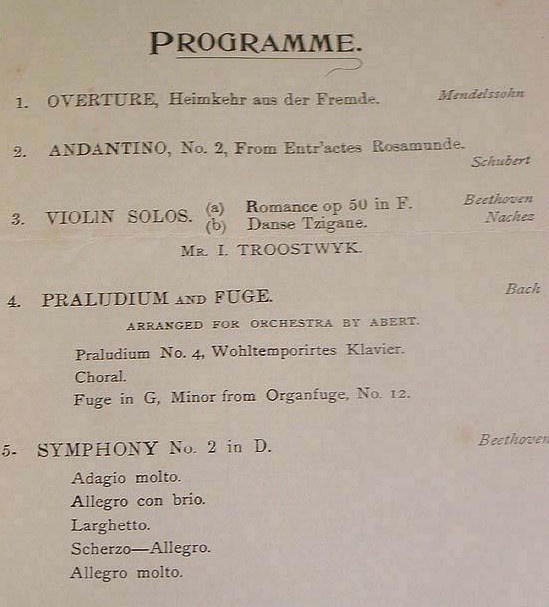
Program of music for orchestra's first concert, December 5, 1895

In 1901, the newly built Woolsey Hall became the chief performance venue of the NHSO. The inaugural concert at Woolsey featured an organ concerto, which made use of the hall's organ.

The Pops concert series began in 1945, with the first performance indoors at the New Haven Arena, on Grove Street, home of the New Haven Eagles ice hockey team. Later that summer, four more concerts were played in the Yale Bowl, for which a band shell was eventually constructed. The outdoor concerts were a great financial success, drawing nearly 40,000 people the first summer.

Throughout the years, the NHSO has continued these traditions of performance and education—supporting programs in the schools and community, and presenting both classical repertoire and pops concerts. The orchestra has performed regularly in New Haven and has also toured throughout Connecticut and beyond (including performances at Lincoln Center and Carnegie Hall); it has given numerous radio broadcasts and made the world-premiere recording of the complete five-movement version of Mahler's first symphony.

== NHSO today ==
=== Concerts ===
The NHSO plays concerts across the city of New Haven primarily from September to June. Their Main Stage series concerts take place in Woolsey Hall at Yale University and the Lyman Center for the Performing Arts at Southern Connecticut State University.

Additionally, the orchestra plays at houses of worship, schools, businesses, parks, festivals, and social service organizations across the city all year round.

The NHSO offers regional performances regularly in its satellite venues in Shelton, CT, including its Pops Series led by Principal Pops Conductor Chelsea Tipton.

=== Guest artists ===
The NHSO has hosted a number of visiting artists and soloists, including Vladimir Ashkenazy, Joshua Bell, Van Cliburn, Renée Fleming, James Galway, Glenn Gould, Yo-Yo Ma, Jessye Norman, Itzhak Perlman, Mstislav Rostropovich, Artur Rubinstein, Emanuel Ax, Gil Shaham, and Pinchas Zukerman.

The NHSO Pops Series has also brought some performers to New Haven. Such notables as Dave Brubeck, Arthur Fiedler, Dizzy Gillespie, Benny Goodman, Wynton Marsalis, Buddy Rich, Ray Charles, Artie Shaw, and Sarah Vaughan have delighted audiences onstage with the New Haven Symphony Orchestra.

== Education programs ==
=== Harmony Fellowships for Underrepresented Musicians, Conductors, Administrators & Board ===
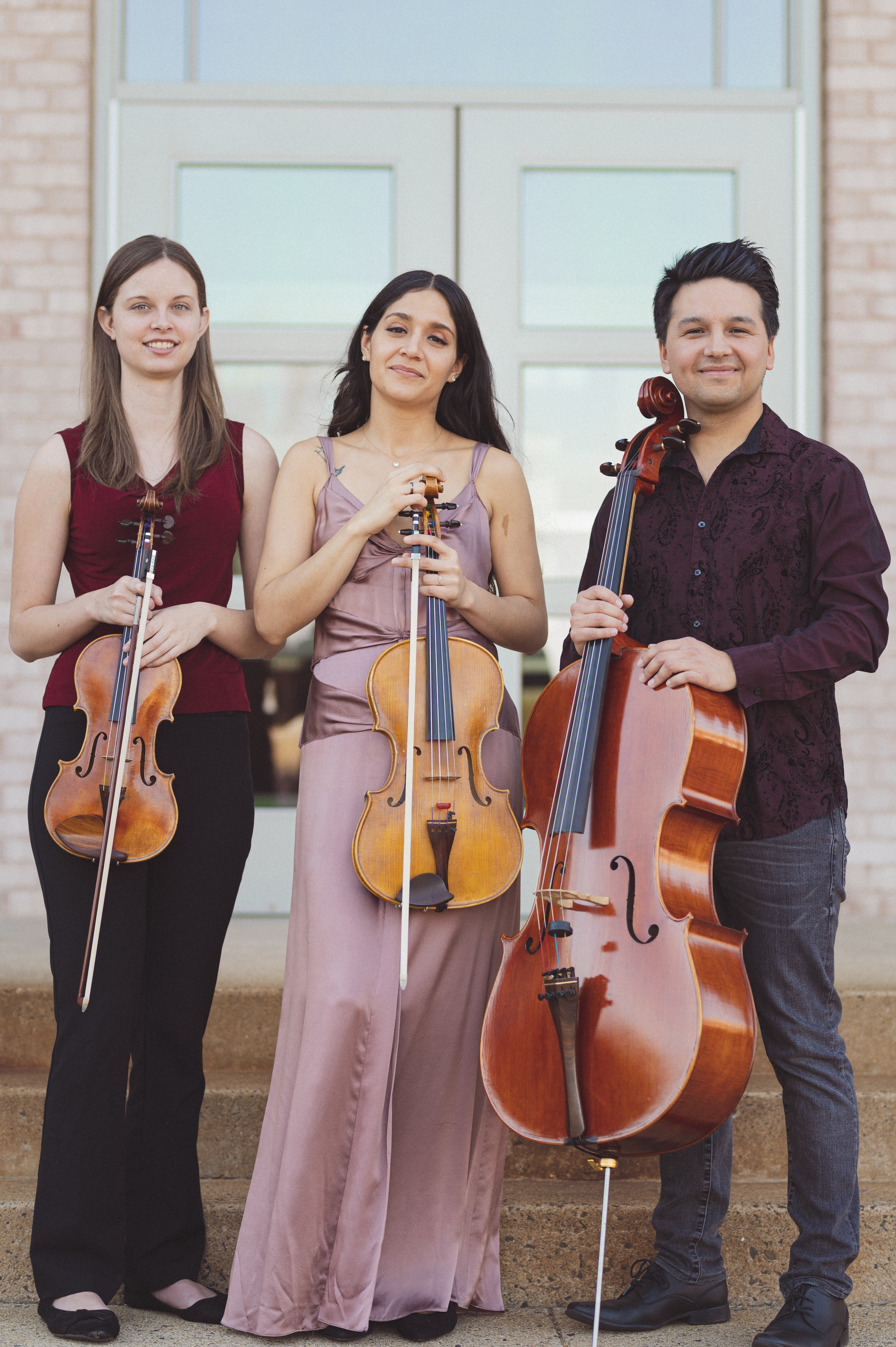
NHSO Harmony Fellowship - Musician cohort class of 2023. Photo by Matthew Fried.

The NHSO expanded its Harmony Fellowship for Underrepresented Musicians, funded by the Ann & Gordon Getty Foundation through the League of American Orchestras to include Conducting, Administrative, and Board Fellows bringing increased diversity to all areas of the symphony.

The Instrumental Fellowship accepts a cohort of two musicians from underrepresented backgrounds every year for a two-year fellowship. Fellows receive lessons, participate in professional development such as mock auditions, and have the opportunity to play concerts with the orchestra. At the end of the two-year fellowship, each fellow will be invited to any future opportunity to audition for the NHSO.

Each cohort, along with two NHSO orchestra members, forms one of two Harmony Quartets. The Harmony Quartets are integral to NHSO education programs that focus on resilience and conflict resolution. For upper elementary school students, a Harmony Quartet presents a conflict resolution workshop. High school students participate in a Song Writing project which culminates in the students receiving a professional recording of their compositions, played by the Harmony Quartets.

Conducting Fellows receive mentorship from Music Director Alasdair Neale and Principal Pops Conductor Chelsea Tipton while Administrative and Board Fellows are paired with staff and board members to work on projects and committees that align with their professional goals.

=== Young People's Concerts ===
Beginning in 2022, the NHSO offered free, public performances of this program, as well as in-school field trip-style performances.

=== Creating Musical Readers ===
The “Creating Musical Readers” initiative, geared towards Pre-K to 2nd grade students, highlights instruments from each of the four families of the orchestra in the context of literacy activities, and is performed at schools, community centers, libraries, and the Connecticut Children's Museum. Each event features a NHSO musician accompanying a storybook about their instrument.

=== Young Composer Project ===
NHSO's “Young Composer Project” allows high school students to study advanced music theory and composition with award-winning professional composers such as Joel Thompson, Christopher Theofandis, Michael Brown, and Augusta Read Thomas. Two years of seminars and lessons lead to premiere performances of student chamber works by NHSO musicians.

== See also ==
- List of symphony orchestras in the United States
- Music of Connecticut
