= High adventure (disambiguation) =

High adventure is a type of outdoor experience.

High adventure may also refer to:

- High Adventure, a 1982 album by Kenny Loggins
- High Adventure (band), an American rock band
- High Adventure (TV series), a 1964 American TV series made up of reruns of previous 1957–1959 specials
