= Kimono (disambiguation) =

A kimono is a Japanese traditional garment.

Kimono may also refer to:

== Music ==
- Kimono (band), Icelandic-Canadian math rock band
- Kimono Draggin', American avant-garde Indie Rock band
- Ras Kimono (1958–2018), Nigerian reggae artist
- Sofia Tornambene (born 2002), Italian singer known as Kimono since 2023

== Other uses ==
- Kimono: Fashioning Culture, a 1993 book by American anthropologist Liza Dalby

== See also ==
- Anna Kimonos (born 1975)
