= The Bushnell Center for the Performing Arts =

Performing arts venue in Hartford, Connecticut

- Interactive map of The Bushnell Center for the Performing Arts
- Former names: Bushnell Memorial Hall
- Address: 166 Capitol Avenue
- Location: Hartford, Connecticut
- Coordinates: 41°45′45″N 72°40′49″W
- Capacity: Mortensen Hall: 2,800; Belding Theater: 906
- Type: Performing arts center

Construction
- Built: 1930
- Architects: Corbett, Harrison and MacMurray

Website
- bushnell.org

The Bushnell Center for the Performing Arts (formerly known as Bushnell Memorial Hall or simply The Bushnell /ˈbʊʃnəl/) is a performing arts venue at 166 Capitol Street in Hartford, Connecticut. Managed by a non-profit organization, it is marketed as Connecticut's premier presenter of the performing arts.

== Building ==
The Bushnell (Mortensen Hall) was completed in 1930 by Dotha Bushnell Hillyer as a "living memorial" to her father, the Reverend Dr. Horace Bushnell (1802–1876), a Hartford minister, theologian, philosopher, and civic leader. In 2002 the Maxwell M. and Ruth R. Belding Theater was opened.

=== Mortensen Hall ===
The original theater building, Mortensen Hall, seats 2,800 and was designed by the architectural firm of Corbett, Harrison, and MacMurray, designers of New York's Radio City Music Hall. It was built with a traditional Georgian Revival exterior and rich Art Deco interior. The cornerstone was laid October 16, 1928, at the corner of Capitol Avenue and Trinity Street, along with a sealed copper box containing: the 1928 Hartford City Directory, issues of the Hartford Courant and Hartford Times, writings of Horace Bushnell, a record of the constitution and by-laws of the Memorial, a copy of the CT General Statutes and samples of U.S. currency.

The original building and Mortensen Hall cost roughly $2.8 Million to build and were completed $110,000 under budget.

Mary Seaverns (Horace Bushnell's Granddaughter), stated that the outside of the Bushnell reflected her grandfather's conservatism and the art deco of the interior reflected his modern theology. Named in honor of William H. Mortensen, a Hartford native who originally aspired to be an insurance executive, Mortensen was selected at the age of 24 to be the eyes and ears of the Bushnell Board. He became Managing Director at age 25 (1927) and remained in that position for 40 years retiring in 1968. Mortensen was also Mayor of Hartford from 1943-45.

Mortensen Hall's features include Drama, the largest hand-painted ceiling mural of its type in the United States, which is suspended from the Hall's roof by numerous metal supports. Painted by Barry Faulkner, and 3 Prix de Rome art scholar winners in his NYC studio at Grand Central Station, the painting cost $50,000 to create in 1929. It is 187' X 40', and has a foundation of wood and paper-mache.

Austin Organ, Mortensen Hall has a 5,600-pipe Austin Organ. Manufactured by the Austin Organ Company of Hartford in 1929 for $45,000. The pipes are located behind the first 3 bays on both sides of the theatre. It underwent a full restoration in the mid-1980s at a cost of over $500,000.

=== The Maxwell M. and Ruth R. Belding Theater ===
This 906-seat theater is named in honor of long-time trustee, Maxwell Belding and his family. A theater designed by Wilson, Butler, and Lodge, "The Belding" was opened in 2002.

The Hartford Symphony Orchestra performs at the Belding Theater regularly.

=== Elephant Eye Theatrical ===
In 2005, The Bushnell joined four other performing arts organizations – Citi Performing Arts Center in Boston, the Ordway Center for the Performing Arts in St. Paul, the Kimmel Center for the Performing Arts in Philadelphia, and the Pittsburgh Civic Light Opera Association in conjunction with the Pittsburgh Cultural Trust – in forming the producing consortium Five Cent Productions, LLC. Following this formation, Five Cent Productions joined former Disney Theatrical Productions Executive Vice President Stuart Oken and Tony Award-winning producer Michael Leavitt as a producing partner in Elephant Eye Theatrical.

Elephant Eye Theatrical is a theatrical development and production company that creates new book musicals for Broadway and beyond. The company finds and initiates projects, assembles creative teams, funds the genesis and ongoing evolution of the projects, and serves as a lead producer when the projects are fully staged.

Elephant Eye Productions include Saved!, The Addams Family and An American in Paris, is set to open on Broadway in April 2015.

=== Independent Presenters Network ===
The Independent Presenter’s Network (IPN) is a consortium of 40 Broadway presenters, theaters, and performing arts centers, including The Bushnell. Its members bring Broadway productions to more than 110 cities throughout North America and Japan. The IPN has produced several shows on Broadway including Thoroughly Modern Millie starring Sutton Foster, The Color Purple, and Legally Blonde.

=== Notable concerts ===
On December 9, 1962, Sammy Davis Jr performed a one-night-only performance. On December 13,1963 Peter, Paul and Mary performed at Bushnell Memorial Hall On October 30, 1965, Bob Dylan performed at Bushnell Memorial Hall.

In 1967, the British Rock Band The Rolling Stones performed at the venue.

On October 20 and 21, 1967, Judy Garland performed a two-night engagement at this venue, singing with a 26-piece orchestra.

On March 22, 1968, Jimi Hendrix performed with his band The Jimi Hendrix Experience.

== See also ==
- List of concert halls
- Music of Connecticut
