= New York Comic Con =

Annual New York City fan convention

Coordinates: 40°45′27″N 74°00′09″W

- Status: Active
- Genre: Speculative fiction
- Venue: Jacob K. Javits Convention Center
- Locations: New York City, New York
- Country: United States
- Inaugurated: February 24, 2006; 20 years ago
- Most recent: October 8, 2026; 27 days ago
- Next event: October 7, 2027; 11 months' time
- Attendance: 250,000 in 2025
- Organizer: ReedPop, a division of RX and RELX plc
- Filing status: For-profit
- Website: New York Comic Con; New York Anime Festival

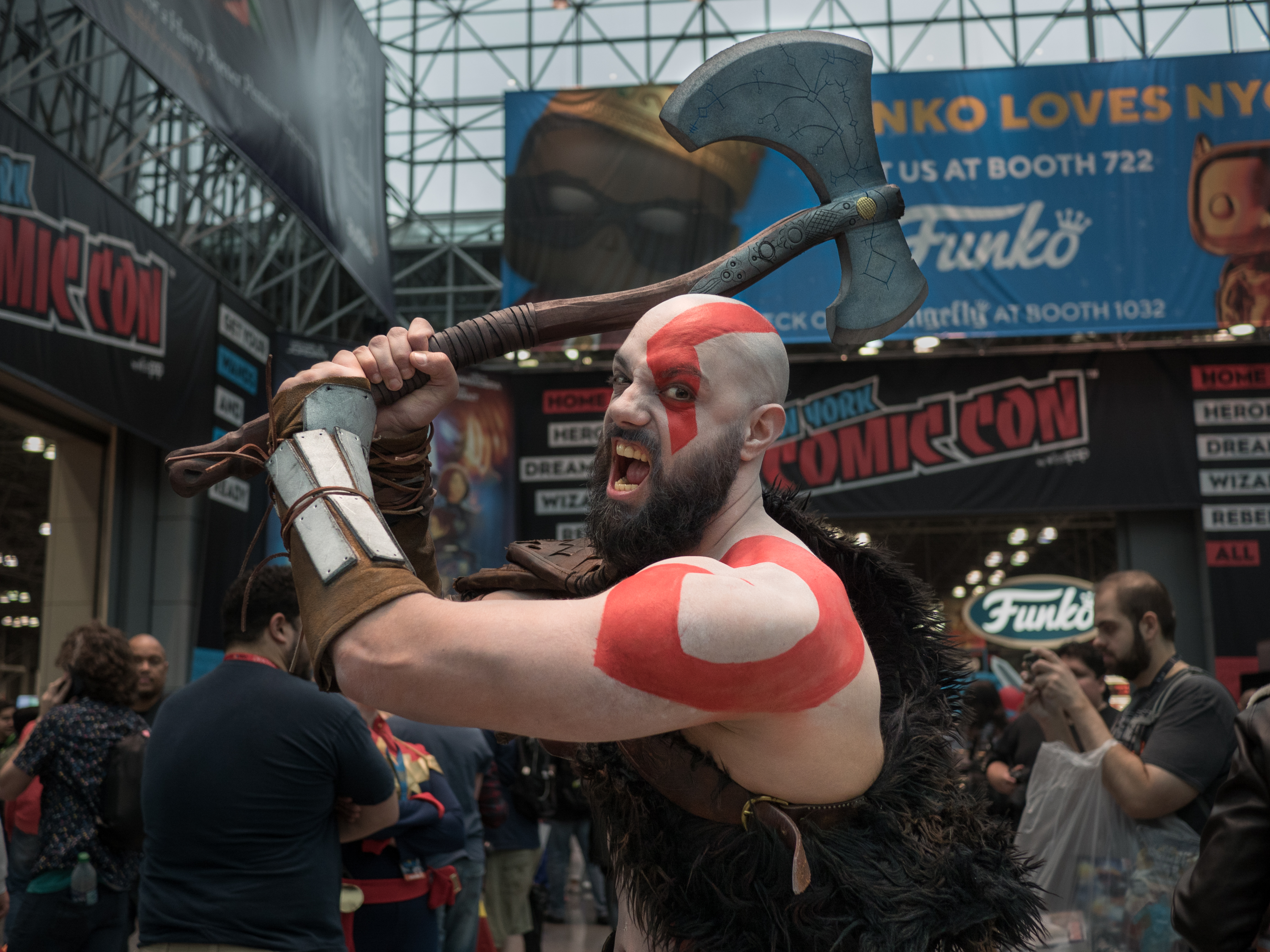
Kratos cosplayer at the 2018 convention

The New York Comic Con (NYCC) is an annual New York City fan convention dedicated to Western comics, graphic novels, anime, manga, video games, cosplay, toys, movies, and television. It was first held in 2006. With an attendance of 200,000 in 2022, it is North America's most attended fan convention. The New York Comic Con is a for-profit event produced and managed by ReedPop, a division of RX and Reed Elsevier, and is not affiliated with the long running non-profit San Diego Comic-Con, nor the Big Apple Convention, later known as the Big Apple Comic-Con, owned by Wizard Entertainment.

== History ==
=== Previous conventions in New York ===
The first recorded "official" comic book convention occurred in 1964 in New York City. Known as the "New York Comicon", it was held July 24, 1964, at the Workman's Circle Building. A one-day convention organized by 16-year-old Bernie Bubnis and fellow enthusiast Ron Fradkin, official guests of the Tri-State Con included Steve Ditko, Flo Steinberg, and Tom Gill. Reports were of over 100 attendees. In 1966, comic book conventions continued to evolve and expand, The July 23–24 New York Comicon (not to be confused with the later "New York Comic Con") was held at the Park Sheraton Hotel, in New York. Produced by John Benson, guests included Jack Kirby, Jim Steranko, Otto Binder, Len Brown, Larry Ivie, Jack Binder, Roy Thomas, Gil Kane, Archie Goodwin, Bhob Stewart, Klaus Nordling, Sal Trapani, Rocke Mastroserio, and Ted White.

=== New York Comic Con ===
The New York Comic Con is a for-profit event produced and managed by ReedPop, a division of RX and Reed Elsevier, and is not affiliated with the long running non-profit San Diego Comic-Con, nor the Big Apple Convention, later known as the Big Apple Comic-Con, owned by Wizard Entertainment. ReedPop is involved with other events, including Chicago Comic & Entertainment Expo (C2E2) and PAX Dev/PAX East/PAX Prime. ReedPop and New York Comic Con were founded by Greg Topalian, former senior vice president of RX.

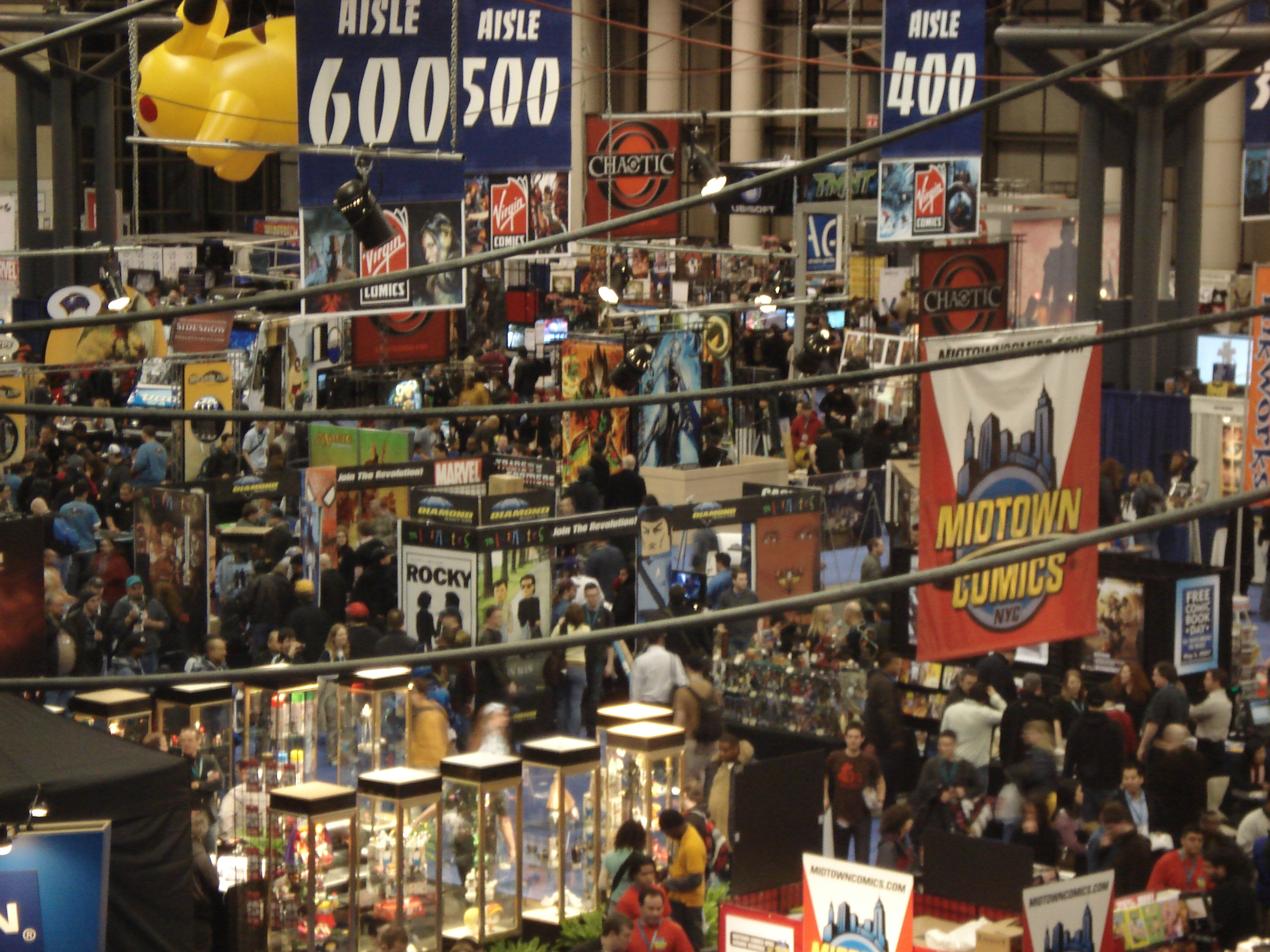
The show floor in 2007

The first con was held in late February 2006 at the Jacob K. Javits Convention Center. Due to RX's lack of experience with comic conventions (they primarily dealt with professional trade shows prior to 2006), attendance was far more than anticipated, and the main exhibition hall could only hold 10,000. Despite crowding on Friday afternoon, tickets continued to be sold due to low pre-reg numbers (4,500), and the non-counting of professionals and exhibitors. The main exhibition hall hit capacity Saturday morning and was locked by the fire marshals until people left, with the lockdown ending in the afternoon. Major guests, including Kevin Smith and Frank Miller, could not enter the main hall. The line to enter the convention wrapped around the building with waits of two hours to enter, and many were turned away. Ticket sales for Sunday were suspended. Reed announced that additional space would be acquired for the 2007 show.

The second con was held in 2007, with the convention organizer booking double the floor space than the previous year's space, and moving to the upper level of the Javits Center. The show on Friday was again only open to industry and press until 4 p.m., when it opened to the public. Due to better planning, advance ticket sales were controlled, and the convention sold out for Saturday. Lines started forming at midnight Saturday to enter the convention, and by Saturday morning, there was a 2-hour wait in 20 degree temperatures to enter. Crowding was a problem in the Artists Alley, which was off the main convention floor, causing it to be moved to the main floor for 2008. The American Anime Awards, hosted by New York Comic Con, was held on February 24 at the New Yorker Hotel, during the Comic Con.

The third con held in 2008 moved to April, continued to grow (expanding space by 50%), and occupied most of the main level in the Javits Center. Stan Lee was awarded the inaugural New York Comics Legend Award at the Times Square Virgin Megastore before the Comic Con. Kids' Day programming was added to the convention on Sunday with the help of Kids's Comic Con. The fourth con held in 2009 returned to February and featured a charity art auction to support The Hero Initiative.

Due to scheduling conflicts with the Javits Center for spring dates and the creation of the Chicago Comic & Entertainment Expo by Reed, New York Comic Con was moved to October for Halloween starting in 2010. The New York Anime Festival, previously a separate event created by Reed, was also merged into Comic Con. Registration for the combined events was 190 percent ahead of 2009's numbers, convention space was increased by an additional 40 percent, and the anime festival was moved to the lower level of the Javits. The main floor of the convention center was split by a large construction area due to repairs to the Javits Center.

Intel Extreme Masters Global Challenge – New York took place in Comic Con 2011. It featured esports tournaments for games such as StarCraft II, League of Legends, and Counter-Strike.

In 2011, the convention was expanded to four days. The first day of the convention was initially limited to press, professionals, and fans that purchased a four-day pass. This changed in 2013, when single day Thursday passes were put on sale for the first time. With this addition, attendance at New York Comic Con grew to over 151,000, surpassing SDCC to become the largest comic convention in North America. The latter was unable to grow further due to venue capacity limits and an attendance cap of 130,000.

In 2016, it was announced that everyone attending NYCC 2016 would be required to complete a "Fan Verification" profile. The event organizers explained that this step was implemented in an attempt to reduce the number of scalpers and resellers who purchase tickets. Fan Verification would only be open from May 20 - June 14, and tickets purchased could only be assigned to someone with a profile. It was also announced that NYCC would no longer be selling VIP tickets, and that show tickets would not be sold at any retailers or events leading up to NYCC 2016.

In 2017, the sale of 3-day and 4-day passes to the event were discontinued. Only single day Thursday, Friday, Saturday, Sunday, and Sunday kids tickets would be sold for the event.

In 2018, the event organizers announced a partnership with Anime Expo for show called Anime Fest @ NYCC X Anime Expo.

In 2019, the sale of 4-day badge returned along with the single day Thursday, Friday, Saturday and Sunday Kids Tickets, would be sold for the event once again, but the 3-day tickets were still discontinued.

The convention's 2020 show was originally scheduled for October 8–11. However, in August, the event's organizers announced the cancellation of their in-person event, due to the COVID-19 pandemic. Instead, a virtual event called "New York Comic Con X MCM Comic Con Metaverse" was on those dates. Tickets to the 2020 in-person event had not gone on sale prior to its cancellation.

New York Comic Con returned to the Javits Center in 2021 with an in-person event held on October 7–10. All attendees over the age of 12 were required to show proof of vaccination, and children under 12 had to show a negative coronavirus test result.

== Location and dates ==
Dates	Location	Attendance	Notable guests
February 24–26, 2006	Jacob K. Javits Convention Center	33,000	Kevin Smith, George R. R. Martin, Frank Miller
February 23–25, 2007	Jacob K. Javits Convention Center	49,000	Stan Lee, Brian K. Vaughan
April 18–20, 2008	Jacob K. Javits Convention Center	64,000	Stan Lee, Frank Miller, T.M. Revolution, Paul Barnett, Coheed and Cambria
February 6–8, 2009	Jacob K. Javits Convention Center	77,000	Dave Gibbons, Joss Whedon, McG, Daniel Dae Kim, Euros Lyn, Lou Ferrigno
October 8–10, 2010	Jacob K. Javits Convention Center	96,000	John Romita Sr., John Romita Jr, Stan Lee
October 13–16, 2011	Jacob K. Javits Convention Center	105,000	Nicki Clyne, Geoff Johns, Tom Kenny, Jim Lee, Todd McFarlane, Frank Miller, Kevin Smith
October 11–14, 2012	Jacob K. Javits Convention Center	116,000	Clark Gregg, Adam West, Stan Lee, Nathan Fillion, Kirk Hammett
October 10–13, 2013	Jacob K. Javits Convention Center	133,000	William Shatner, John Barrowman, Felicia Day, David Duchovny, Gillian Anderson, H. Jon Benjamin, Aisha Tyler, Seth Green, Matthew Senreich, Breckin Meyer, Macaulay Culkin, Clare Grant
October 9–12, 2014	Jacob K. Javits Convention Center	151,000	Todd McFarlane, Bill Nye, Kevin Bacon, Patrick Stewart, Brent Spiner, Denise Crosby, Gates McFadden, LeVar Burton, William Shatner, Kevin Smith, Seth Green, Matthew Senreich, Breckin Meyer, Clare Grant, H. Jon Benjamin, Aisha Tyler, Jack McBrayer, Tom Kenny, Laura Vandervoort, Sonequa Martin-Green, Ioan Gruffudd, Alana de la Garza
October 8–11, 2015	Jacob K. Javits Convention Center	170,000	Bryan Cranston, Nathan Fillion, Natalie Dormer, Jack Black, Vin Diesel
October 6–9, 2016	Jacob K. Javits Convention Center	Over 180,000	Yusei Matsui, Adam Savage, Adam West, Alan Tudyk, Alex Kingston, Carrie Fisher, Evangeline Lilly, Jack Gleeson, Jenna Coleman, Jon Bernthal, Jonny Lee Miller, Lucy Lawless, Lucy Liu, Matt Smith, Neil deGrasse Tyson, Peter Capaldi, Robert Kirkman, Stan Lee, Steven Moffat, Adam Hughes, Jim Cheung, Sara Pichelli, Garth Nix, Maggie Stiefvater, Naomi Novik
October 5–8, 2017	Jacob K. Javits Convention Center	Over 200,000	Neal Adams, Troy Baker, Bruce Campbell, Peter Capaldi, Chris Claremont, Kevin Conroy, Mark Hamill, Todd McFarlane, Vic Mignogna, Nolan North, Norman Reedus, Michael Rooker, Kevin Smith, Tara Strong, Skottie Young
October 4–7, 2018	Jacob K. Javits Convention Center	Over 250,000	Alex Kingston, Ben Savage, Bill Nye, Danai Gurira, Danielle Fishel, David Tennant, Dean Cain, Guillermo del Toro, Jason David Frank, Jason Momoa, Mark Ruffalo, Mark Sheppard, Matt Smith, Michelle Rodriguez, Teri Hatcher, Will Friedle, Zachary Levi
October 3–6, 2019	Jacob K. Javits Convention Center	260,000	Neal Adams, Karan Ashley, Sean Astin, Michael Biehn, Johnny Yong Bosch, Billy Boyd, Justin Briner, Mark Brooks, Talent Caldwell, James Callis, Greg Capullo, Steve Cardenas, Charisma Carpenter, Jim Cheung, Chris Claremont, Colleen Clinkenbeard, Katie Cook, Michael Copon, Jonathan Coulton, Jonny Cruz, Colleen Doran, Barbara Dunkelman, Kevin Eastman, Christopher Eccleston, Ashley Eckstein, Ricco Fajardo, Keith Giffen, Michael Golden, Seth Green, Pia Guerra, Jennifer Hale, Larry Hama, Erica Henderson, Tom Hiddleston, Greg Hildebrandt, Greg Horn, Phil Jimenez, Amy Jo Johnson, Christopher Jones, Doug Jones, Lindsay Jones, Robert Kirkman, Adam Kubert, Erik Larsen, Jae Lee, Jim Lee, Rob Liefeld, Jim Mahfood, Francis Manapul, James Marsters, Sonequa Martin-Green, Todd McFarlane, Ed McGuinness, Bob McLeod, Breckin Meyer, Frank Miller, Kel Mitchell, Ronald D. Moore, Nichelle Nichols, Paige O'Hara, Bryce Papenbrook, Dan Parent, Whilce Portacio, Eric Powell, Andy Price, Brian Pulido, Humberto Ramos, Amy Reeder, John Romita Jr., Christopher Sabat, Tim Sale, Adam Savage, Sean Schemmel, Patrick Seitz, Matthew Senreich, Marc Silvestri, Gail Simone, Dan Slott, Austin St. John, Brian Stelfreeze, R. L. Stine, Philip Tan, James Arnold Taylor, Veronica Taylor, Ben Templesmith, Billy Tucci, Billy Dee Williams, Benedict Wong
October 7–10, 2021	Jacob K. Javits Convention Center	150,000	Dante Basco, Greg Capullo, John Cena, Hayden Christensen, Chris Claremont, David Harbour, Jae Lee, Rob Liefeld, Mary McDonnell, Kate Mulgrew, Edward James Olmos, Adam Savage, William Shatner, George Takei, Veronica Taylor, Eric Vale, Janet Varney, Matthew Wood
October 6–9, 2022	Jacob K. Javits Convention Center	200,000	Anson Mount, April Bowlby, Ben Barnes, Bitsie Tulloch, Brendan Fraser, Cassandra Peterson, Christopher Lloyd, Colleen Clinkenbeard, Diane Guerrero, Erica Durance, Felicia Day, Freddie Prinze Jr., Harvey Guillén, Ice-T, John Glover, John Leguizamo, Kristin Kreuk, Melissa Navia, Michael J. Fox, Mick Foley, Oscar Isaac, R.L. Stine, Rachael Leigh Cook, Ralph Macchio, Rodger Bumpass, Sebastian Stan, Steve Burns, Tom Kenny, Tom Welling, Tyler Hoechlin
October 12–15, 2023	Jacob K. Javits Convention Center	200,000	Ashley Eckstein, Avi Roque, Charisma Carpenter, Chris Evans, Cissy Jones, Con O'Neill, David Tennant, Dee Bradley Baker, Diane Guerrero, Ewan McGregor, John Carpenter, Karen Gillan, Kathryn Newton, Kristian Nairn, Mary Elizabeth Winstead, Matthew Maher, Michael Rooker, Michelle Gomez, Nathan Foad, Pom Klementieff, Rhys Darby, Rob Paulsen, Ron Perlman, Sarah-Nicole Robles, Shameik Moore, Sean Gunn, Susan Sarandon, Tim Curry, Tom Hiddleston, Vico Ortiz, Will Poulter, Zachary Levi
October 17–20, 2024	Jacob K. Javits Convention Center	200,000	Aaron Moten, Alex Brightman, Alex Hirsch, Andy Serkis, Ashley Eckstein, Billy West, Cameron Monaghan, Carla Gugino, Casper Van Dien, Colby Minifie, Cristo Fernández, Danny Elfman, Denise Richards, Dina Meyer, Domenick Lombardozzi, Eli Roth, Elizabeth Olsen, Ella Purnell, Fabien Frankel, Freddie Prinze Jr., Greg Cipes, Hayley Atwell, Hugh Dancy, Hynden Walch, Jack Quaid, jacksepticeye, Jason Lee, Jason Mewes, Jim Cummings, Jodie Whittaker, John Bell, John Boyega, John DiMaggio, Josh Brolin, Kate Siegel, Kevin Smith, Khary Payton, Kimiko Glenn, Kurt Fuller, Kyle MacLachlan, Mads Mikkelsen, Maggie Lawson, Marisa Tomei, Matt Smith, Michael Ironside, Mike Flanagan, Noel Fisher, Orlando Bloom, Paul Bettany, Phil LaMarr, Rachael Leigh Cook, Rahul Kohli, Rebecca Mader, Richard Rankin, Scott Menville, Sean Maguire, Seth Gilliam, Sophie Skelton, Tara Strong, Ti West, Timothy Omundson, Tom Glynn-Carney, Tui T. Sutherland, Vivienne Medrano, Walton Goggins
October 9-12, 2025	Jacob K. Javits Convention Center	250,000	Annie Potts, Arden Cho, Ashley Johnson, Brendan Fraser, Bryce Dallas Howard, Charlie Cox, Chloe Bennet, Christopher Daniel Barnes, Clark Gregg, Dante Basco, David Errigo Jr., Deborah Ann Woll, Elliot Page, Ernie Hudson, George R. R. Martin, George Takei, Hamish Linklater, Ioan Gruffudd, Jack DeSena, James McAvoy, Jodi Benson, Jon Bernthal, Joe Pantoliano, Karen Gillan, Karl Urban, Krysten Ritter, Laura Bailey, Laurence Fishburne, Liam O'Brien, Mae Whitman, Marisha Ray, Martin Sheen, Matthew Mercer, May Hong, Meng'er Zhang, Michael Chiklis, Michaela Jill Murphy, Mike Colter, Ming-Na Wen, Neil deGrasse Tyson, Paul Walter Hauser, R.L. Stine, Sam Riegel, Steve Burns, Sigourney Weaver, Simon Pegg, Simu Liu, Taliesin Jaffe, Tatiana Maslany, Tim Blake Nelson, Tom Skerritt, Travis Willingham, Troy Baker, Veronica Cartwright, Vincent D'Onofrio, Vincent Martella, Wayne Brady, Zach Tyler Eisen
October 8-11, 2026	Jacob K. Javits Convention Center		Ahmed Best, Alice Cooper, Ariana Richards, BD Wong, Ben Starr, Bitsie Tulloch, Bonnie Erickson, Brent Spiner, Carlos Valdes, Carrie-Anne Moss, Charlie Cox, Christian Slater, Danielle Panabaker, Danny Pudi, Darryl McDaniels, Dave Goelz, Deborah Ann Woll, Denise Crosby, Eric Jacobson, Erica Durance, Frank Miller, Grant Gustin, Hayden Christensen, Ian McDiarmid, Idina Menzel, Jamie Campbell Bower, Jamie Kennedy, Jason Mewes, Jim Rash, Joe Lo Truglio, Joel McHale, John Rhys-Davies, John Wesley Shipp, Joseph Mazzello, Kane Hodder, Ken Jeong, Kristin Kreuk, Krysten Ritter, Kyle MacLachlan, Lee Waddell, Lena Headey, Marshawn Lynch, Matt Smith, Matt Vogel, Matthew Lillard, Melissa Benoist, Melissa Fumero, Michael Cudlitz, Michael Rosenbaum, Mick Foley, Nana Visitor, Nancy Allen, Neil Newbon, Nicolas Cage, Paul Bettany, Peter Weller, Rainn Wilson, R.L. Stine, Rick Riordan, Robert Picardo, Rosario Dawson, Sebastian Stan, Skeet Ulrich, Stephanie Beatriz, Steven Van Zandt, Tom Welling, Tyler Hoechlin, Wayne Knight, William Shatner, Wilson Bethel

== New York Anime Festival ==
The New York Anime Festival was an anime and manga convention held annually from 2007 to 2011 at the Jacob K. Javits Convention Center on the West Side of Manhattan in New York City. Produced by RX, the people behind New York Comic Con, the inaugural event was held from December 7 through December 9, 2007. Starting in 2010 the New York Anime Festival has been held with the New York Comic Con, bringing the two cultures together. In 2012, the New York Anime festival was absorbed into Comic Con.

=== Event history ===
Dates	Location	Atten.	Guests
December 7–9, 2007	Jacob K. Javits Center; New York, New York	15,000	Yoshi Amao, Juno Blair B., Svetlana Chmakova, Colleen Clinkenbeard, Justin Cook, Abby Denson, Omar Dogan, Elena Dorfman, Josh Elder, Peter Fernandez, GeekNights, happyfunsmile, Chris Hazelton, Lindsey Henninger, Joanne Izbicki, David Kalat, Yasuhiro Koshi, Rachael Lillis, Patrick Macias, Mike McFarland, Disorganization XIII, Jamie McGonnigal, Joe Ng, Corinne Orr, Lisa Ortiz, Katsushi Ota, Sean Schemmel, Kobun Shizuno, Mike Sinterniklaas, Aimee Major Steinberger, Sonny Strait, Timothy Sullivan, Veronica Taylor, Michael "Mookie" Terracciano, Uncle Yo, Unicorn Table, Voltaire, Tom Wayland.
September 26–28, 2008	Jacob K. Javits Center; New York, New York	18,399	Yoshitaka Amano, Steven Blum, Mandy Bonhomme, Abby Denson, echostream, Peter Fernandez, Kyle Hebert, Lindsey Henninger, Roland Kelts, Hideyuki Kikuchi, Disorganization XIII, Rachael Lillis, Love etc., Jamie McGonnigal, Kevin McKeever, Misako Rocks!, The Notorious MSG, Tony Oliver, Corinne Orr, Lisa Ortiz, Bill Rogers, Mike Sinterniklaas, Timothy Sullivan, Brad Swaile, Rie Tanaka, Veronica Taylor, TsuShiMaMiRe, Uncle Yo, Voltaire, Tom Wayland, Pierre Bernard, Ichigo Pantsu, Masaharu Morimoto, Chris Ward.
September 25–27, 2009	Jacob K. Javits Center; New York, New York	21,388	Yoshiyuki Tomino, Yui Makino, Brittney Karbowski, Cherami Leigh, Disorganization XIII, Eric Maruscak, Green Light Anti-Zombie Squad, Jamie Marchi, Jamie McGonnigal, Kyle Hebert, Laura Bailey, Lindsey Henninger, Ichigo Pantsu, Mario Bueno, Micah Solusod, Michael Sinterniklaas, Misako Rocks!, Monica Rial, Rachael Lillis, Scott Westerfeld, Shien Lee, Todd Haberkorn, Tom Wayland, Travis Willingham, Uncle Yo, Reni Mimura, Veronica Taylor, echostream, Zach Bolton, AKB48, Gelatine, Masazumi Kato, Kokusyoku Sumire, Timothy Sullivan, Swinging Popsicle.
October 8–10, 2010	Jacob K. Javits Center; New York, New York		Minori Chihara, Toshihiro Fukuoka, Gashicon, Rika Ishikawa, Hiroyuki Ito, Kanon, Takamasa Sakurai, Tow Ubukata, Yoshiki, Puffy Amiyumi, VAMPS, Boom Boom Satellites, Zazen Boys, echostream, Oyama X Nitta, Crispin Freeman, Anime Parliament, Christopher Bevins, Mario Bueno, Disorganization XIII, ichiP, Taliesin Jaffe, Rachael Lillis, Jamie McGonnigal, Reni Mimura, Misako Rocks!, Corinne Orr, Stephanie Sheh, Ian Sinclair, Mike Sinterniklaas, J. Michael Tatum, Veronica Taylor, Cristina Vee, Tom Wayland, Tommy Yune, Uncle Yo.
October 13–16, 2011	Jacob K. Javits Center; New York, New York		Dai Satō, Hideo Katsumata, Hiro Mashima, Hiroyuki Itoh, Junko Takeuchi, Katsuhiro Harada, Koichiro Natsume, Makoto Shinkai, Masataka P, Masayuki Ozaki, Misako Rocks!, Toshihiro Fukuoka, Andrew Bell, Cherami Leigh, Chris Sabat, Chris Castagnetto, Colleen Clinkenbeard, Justin Cook, High Adventure (band), Kevin McKeever, Mandy Bonhomme, Mario Bueno, Newton Pittman, Roland Kelts, Sean Schemmel, Todd Haberkorn, Tyler Walker, Veronica Taylor, Uncle Yo.

== Eastern Championships of Cosplay ==
The Eastern Championships of Cosplay have been held at New York Comic Con since 2014. They are one of the stops in ReedPop's global Crown Championships of Cosplay circuit. The top three winning cosplayers receive cash prizes and the overall winner, the Eastern Champion, is entered into the final held at Chicago Comic & Entertainment Expo. Costumes are judged in four skill categories and then in an overall category. The skill categories are:

- Needlework
- Armor
- FX (including animatronics, prosthetics, and other effects)
- Larger than Life

=== Winners ===
Year	1st	2nd	3rd
2014	Michael Wong (Dragon Rider)	Julian "PhazonJuke" Keller (General Zod, Man of Steel)	Adrián Santiago Aroche (Skull Kid, The Legend of Zelda)
2015	Thomas DePetrillo (Hulkbuster Iron Man, Marvel Comics)	Sarah Jean "PepperMonster" Maefs (Angela of Asgard, Marvel Comics)	Adrián Santiago Aroche (Ganondorf, The Legend of Zelda)
2016	Rachel "Lucky Grim" Sanderson (Frau, Sakizou artwork)	outLAW2LK (Voltron, Voltron: Legendary Defender)	David "Cap Santiago" Santiago (The Wanderer, Fallout)
2017	Jacqueline "Alchemical Cosplay" Collins (Astrologian, Final Fantasy XIV)	Mike "Unorthodox Design" Cameron (Orkish Wasteland, Fallout)	Cowbutt Crunchies (Seraphim, Sakizou artwork)

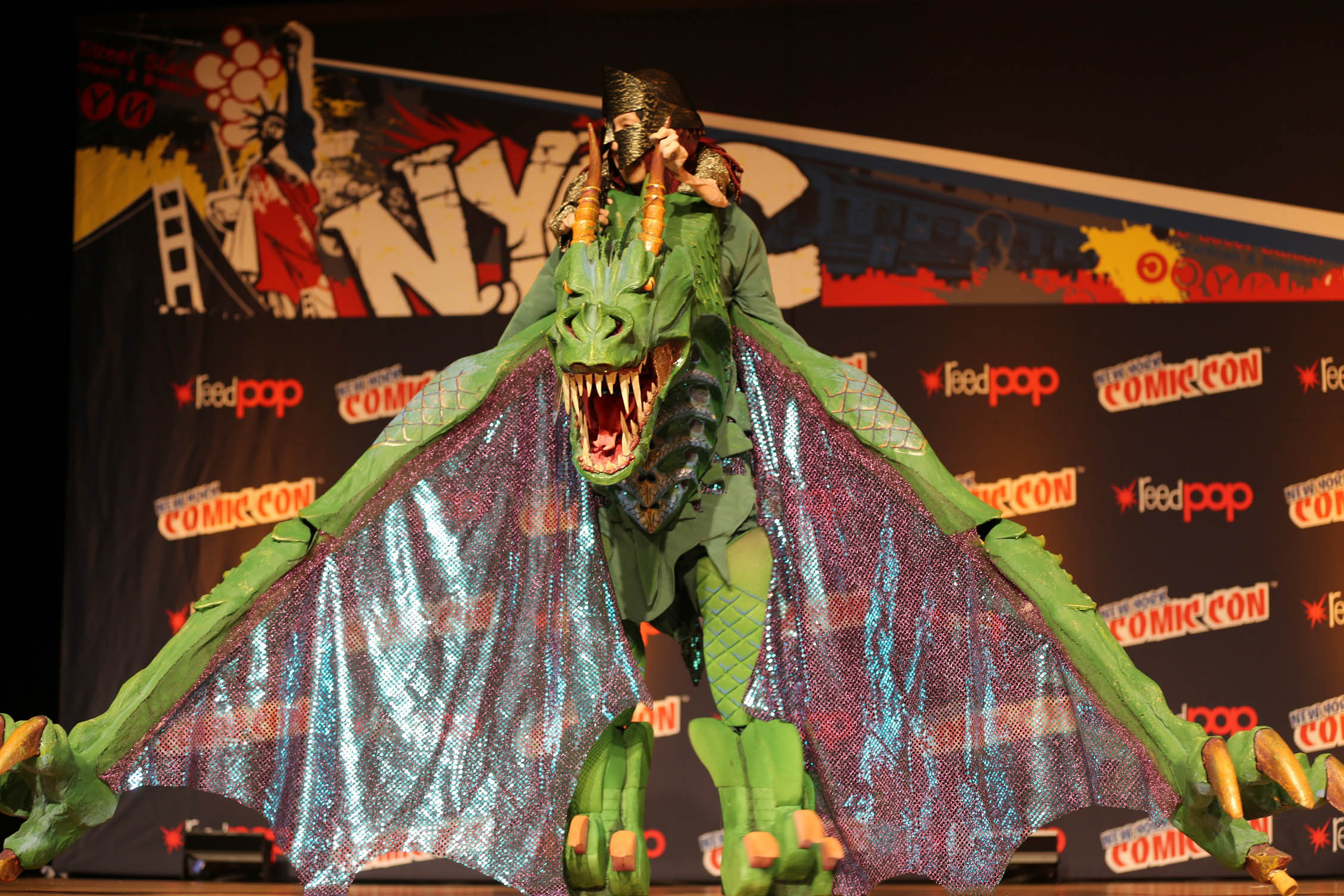
Michael Wong (2014)

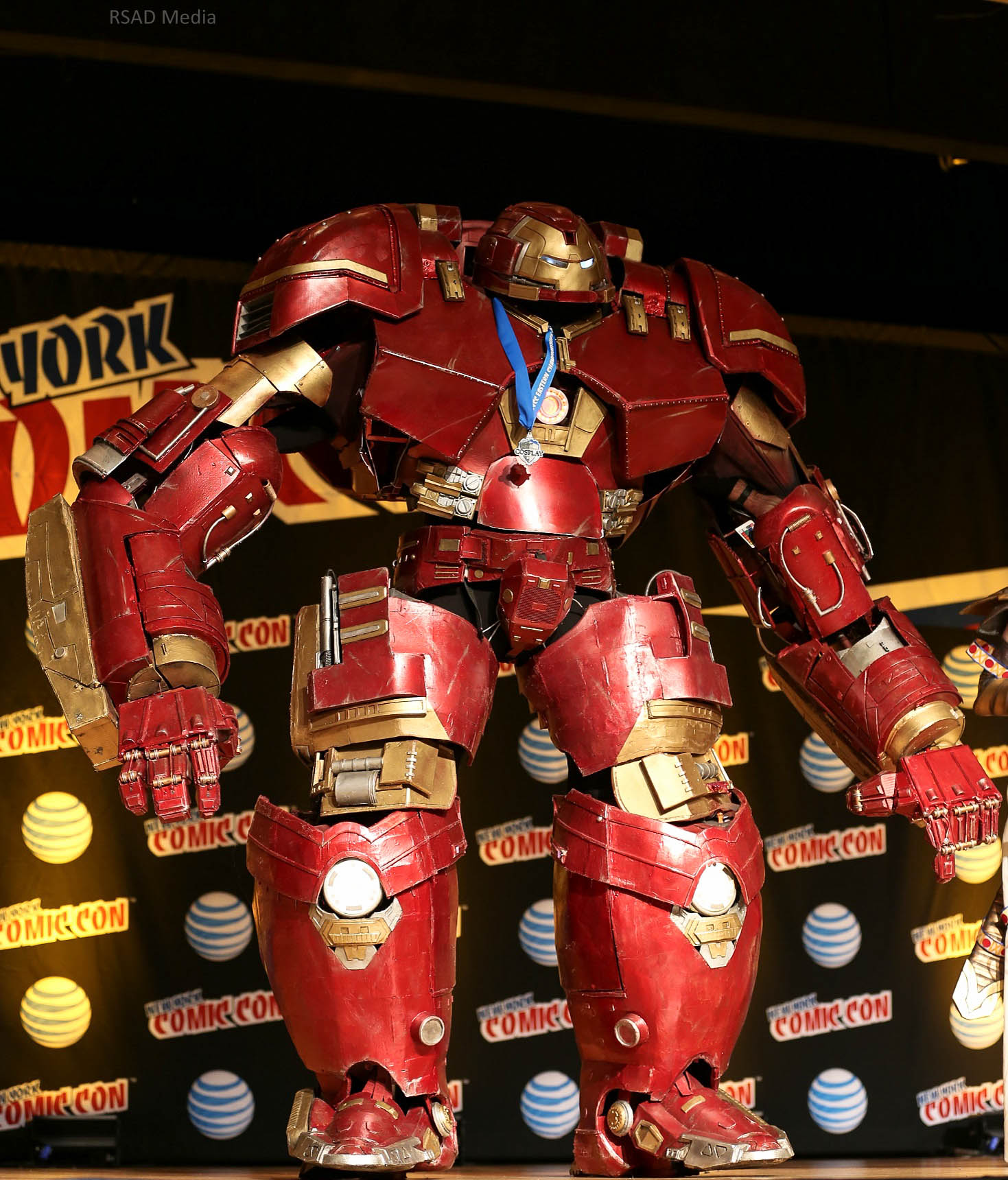
Thomas DePetrillo (2015)

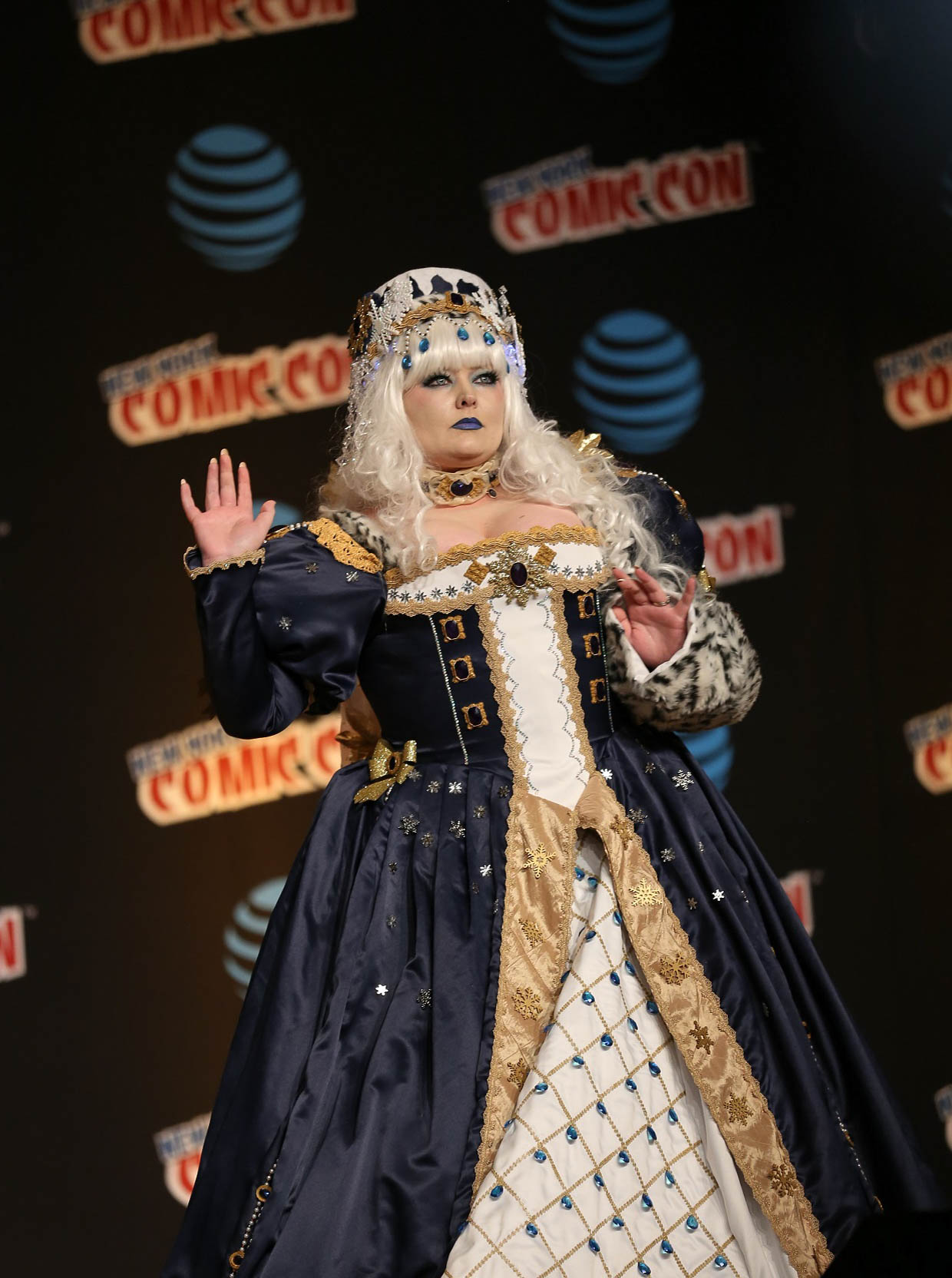
Rachel Sanderson (2016)

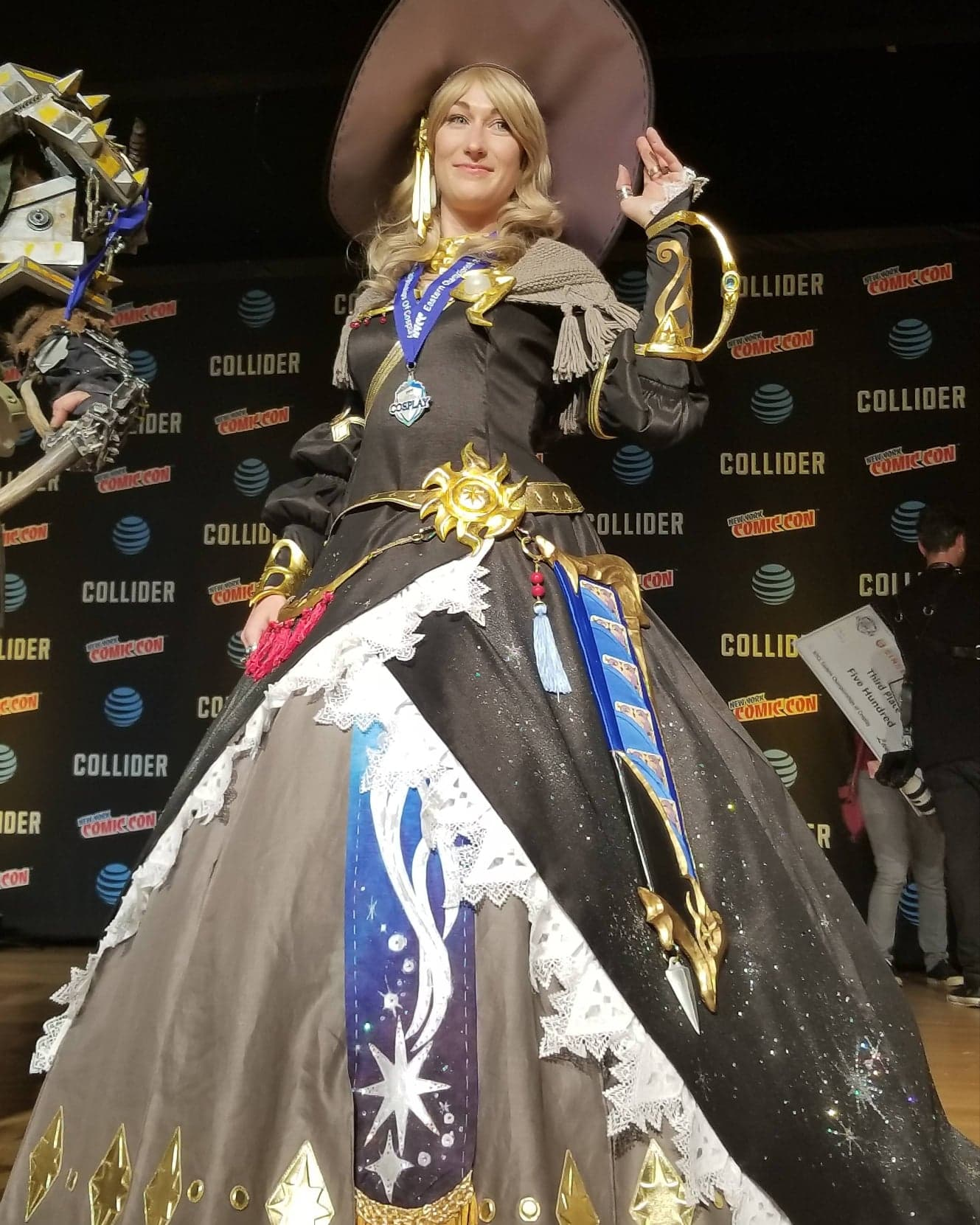
Jacqueline Collins (2017)

== Gallery ==
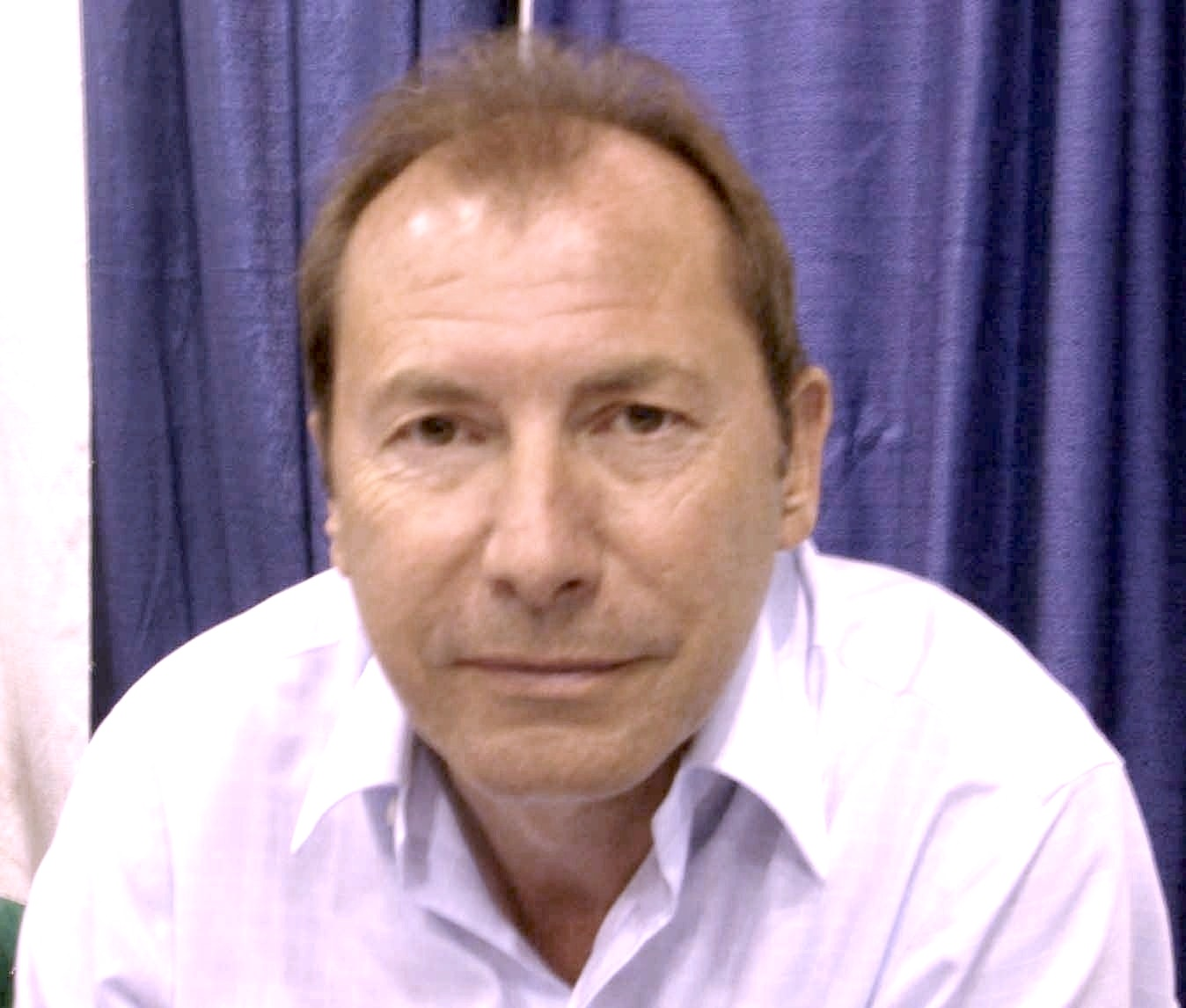
V for Vendetta artist David Lloyd at the April 2008 convention

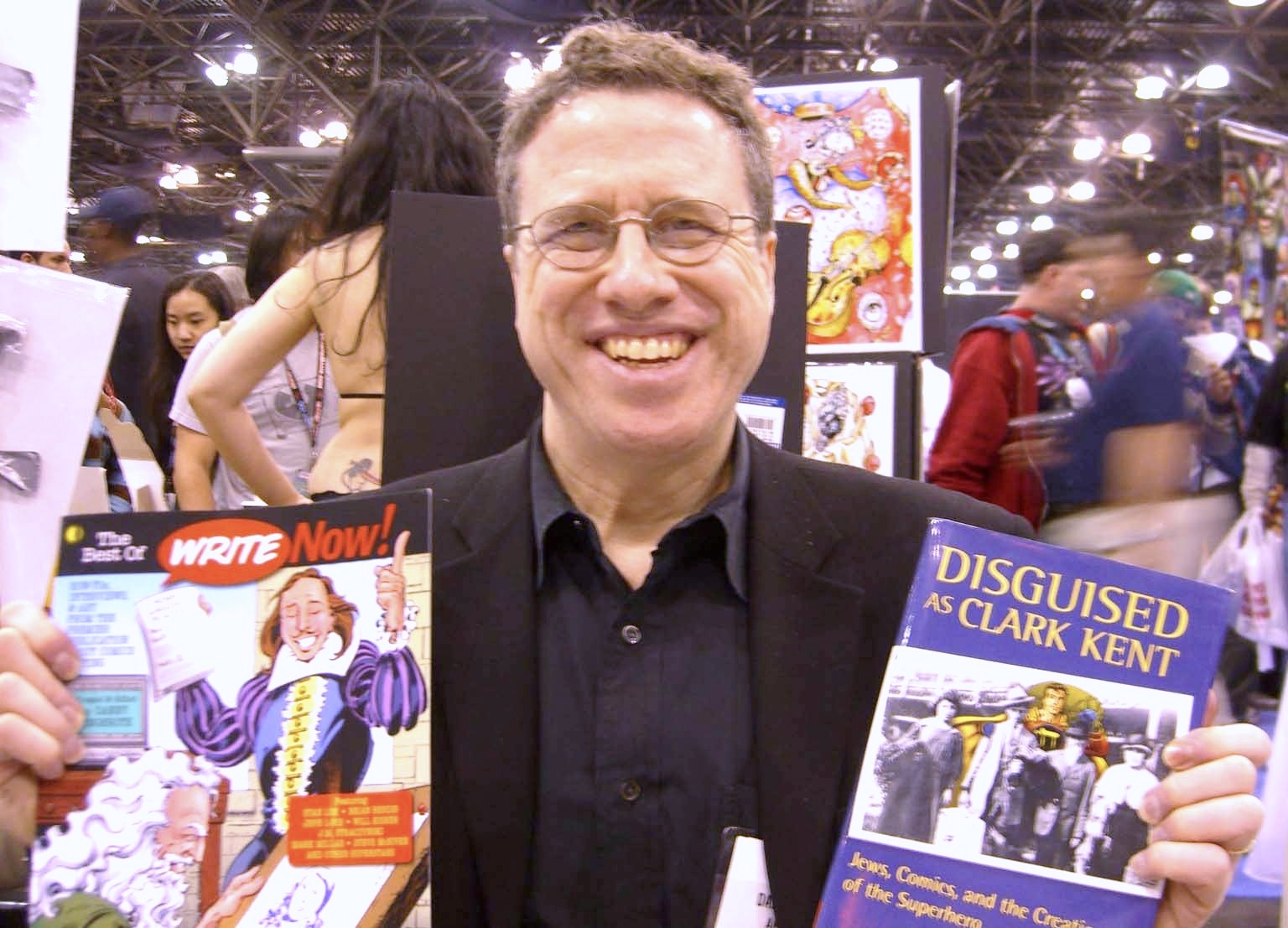
Danny Fingeroth at the April 2008 convention

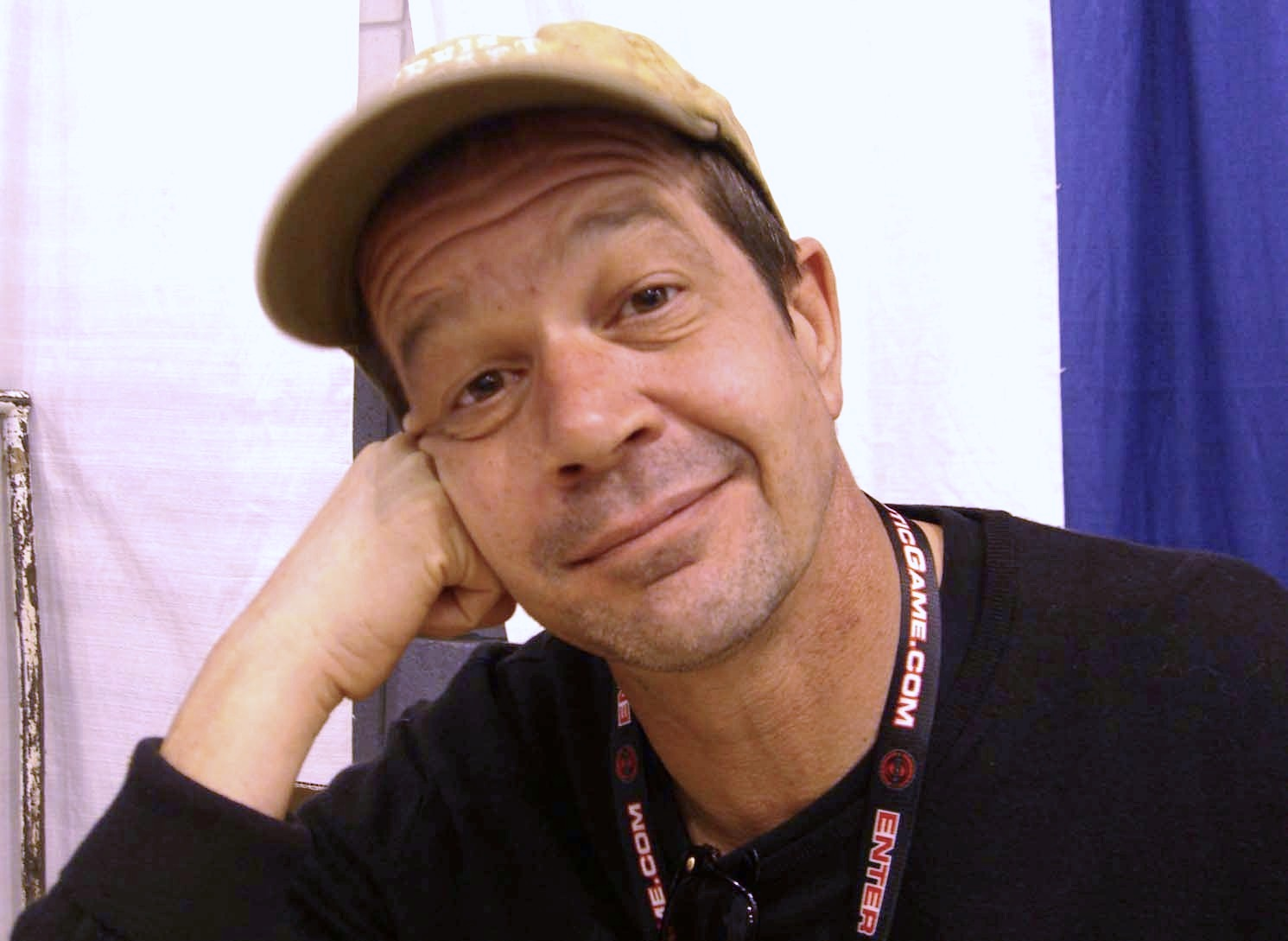
DC: The New Frontier artist Darwyn Cooke at the April 2008 convention

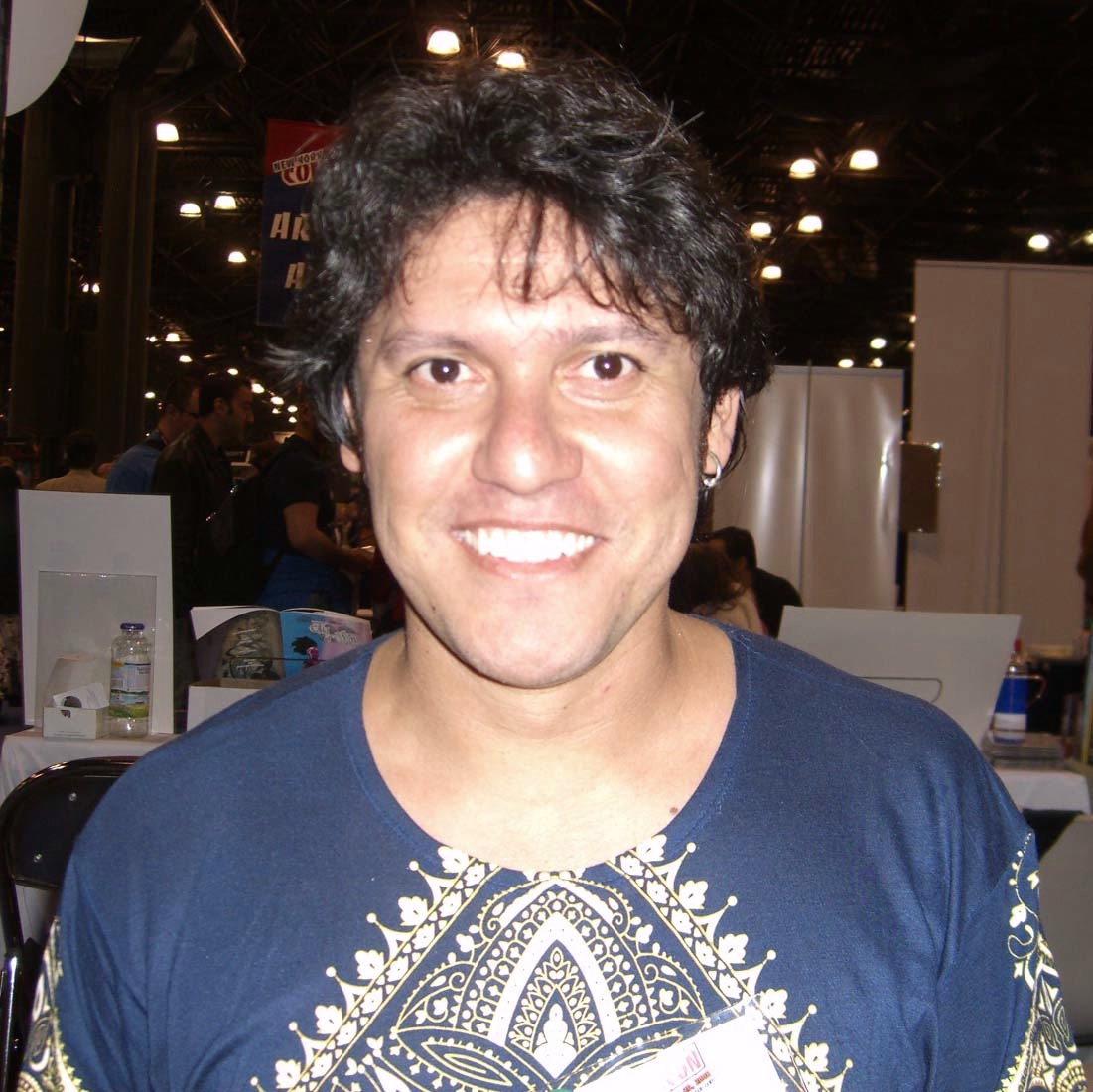
Green Lantern artist Ivan Reis at the April 2008 convention

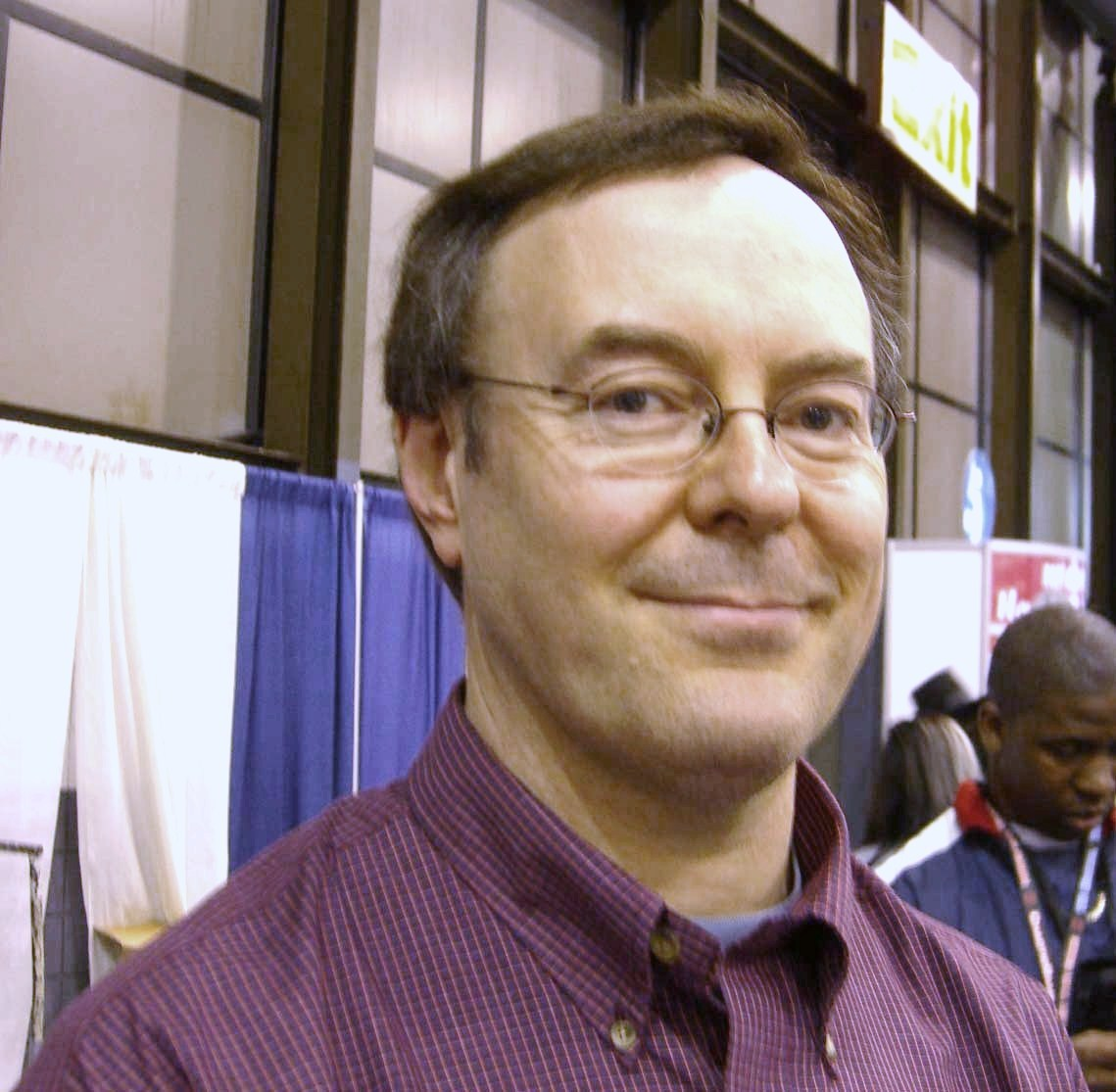
Artist Jerry Ordway at the April 2008 convention

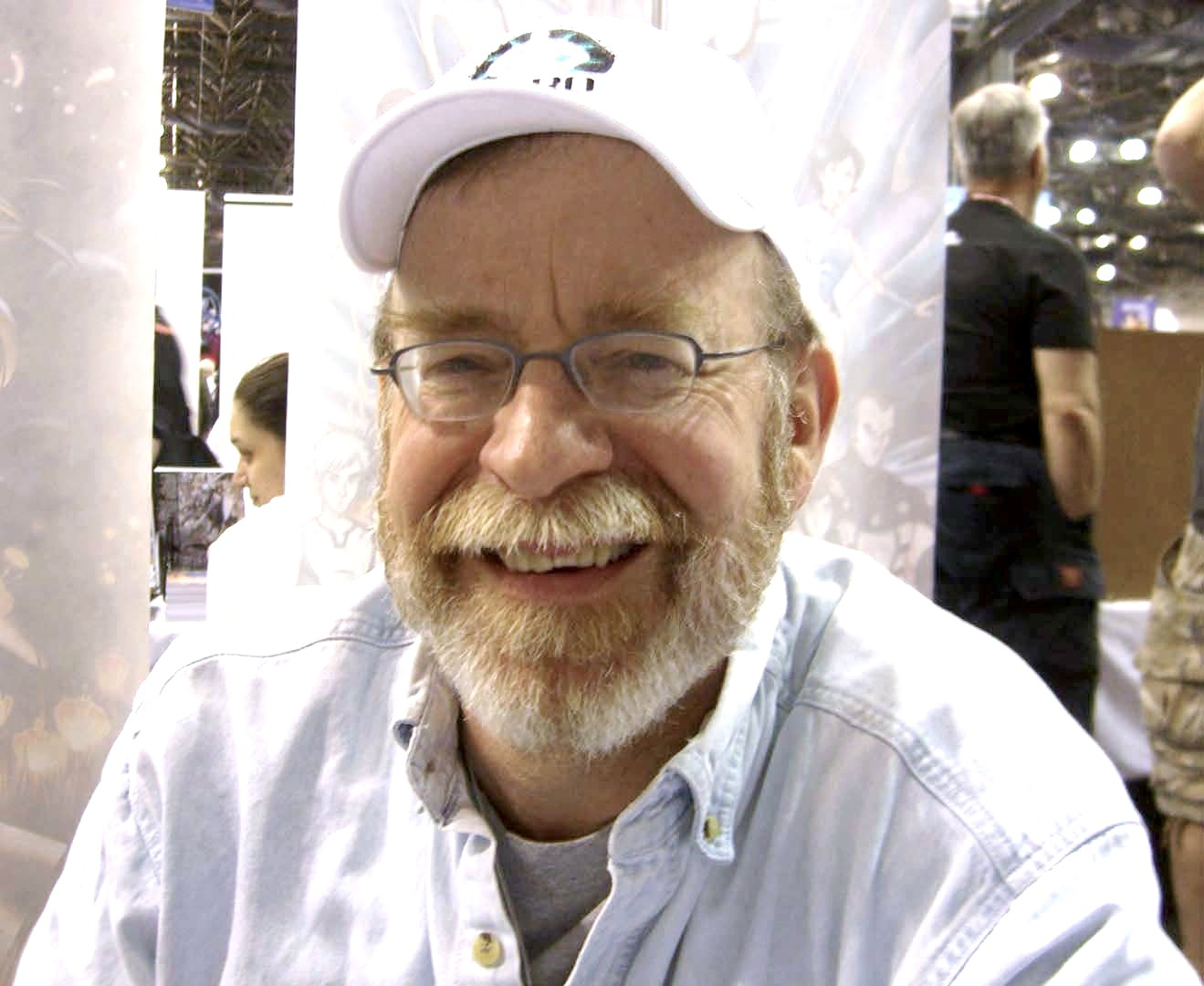
Thor writer/artist Walt Simonson at the April 2008 convention

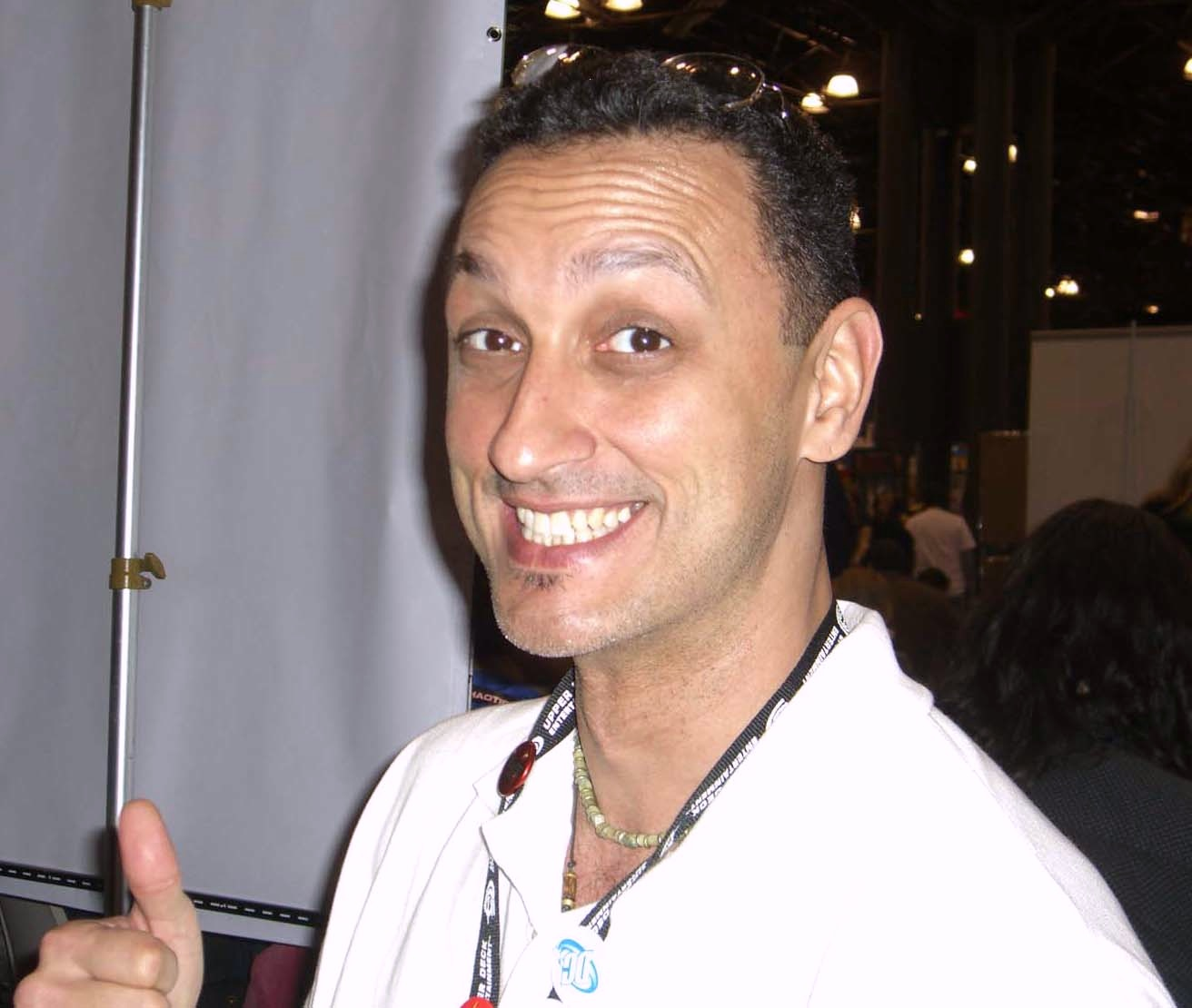
Identity Crisis artist Rags Morales at the April 2008 convention

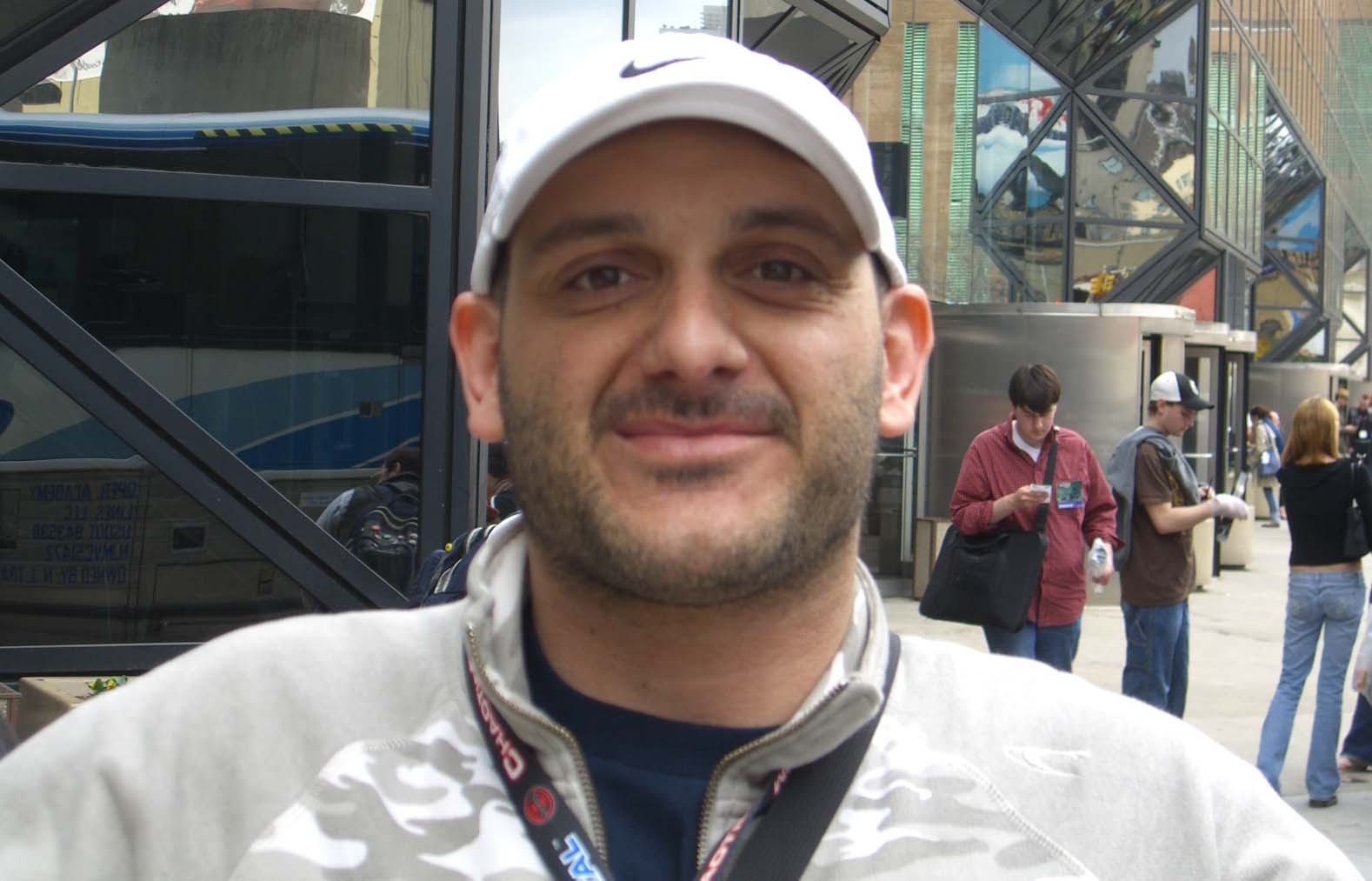
Italian artist Simone Bianchi at the April 2008 convention

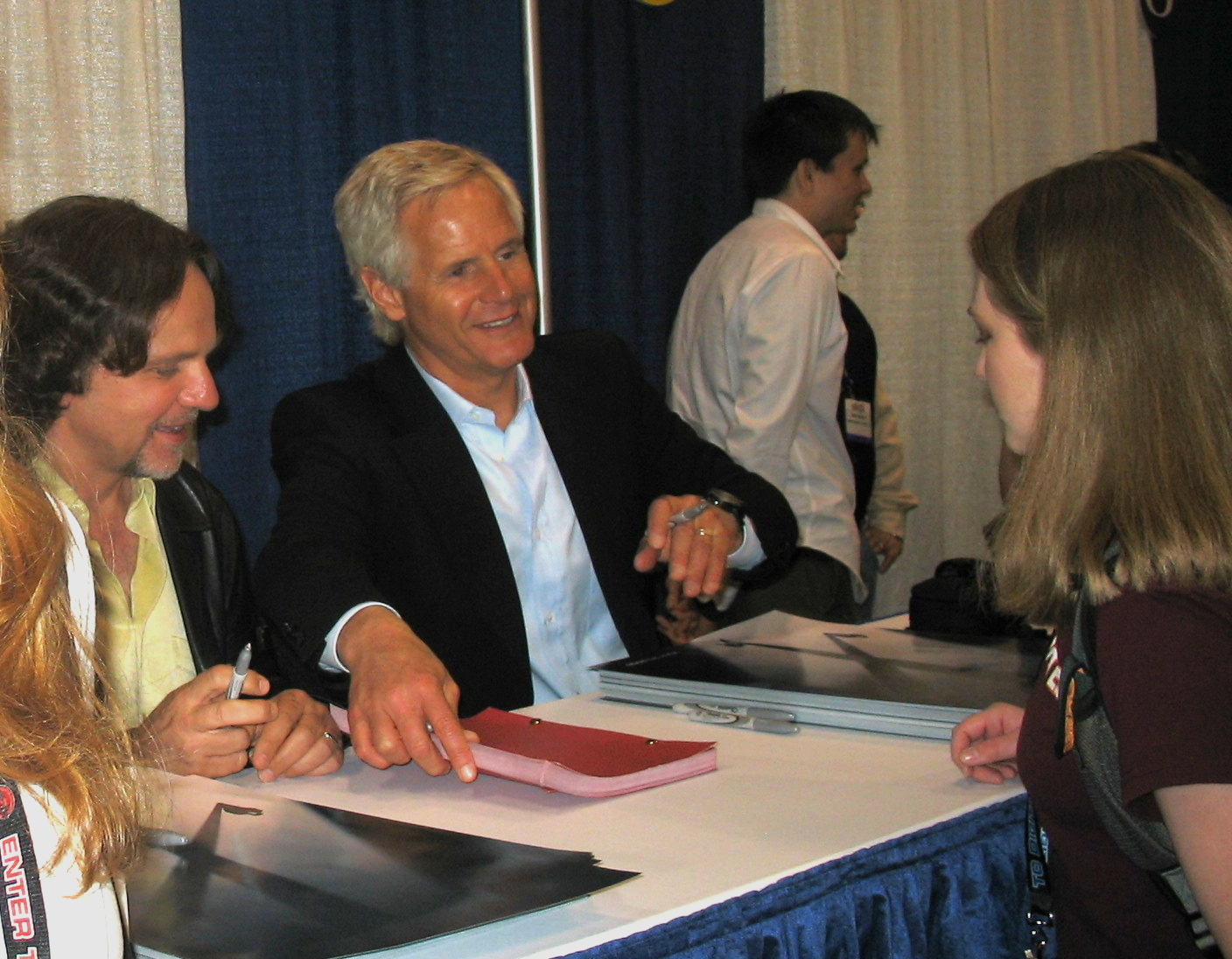
New York Comic Con during the X-Files autograph session with Chris Carter and Frank Spotnitz, creators of The X-Files

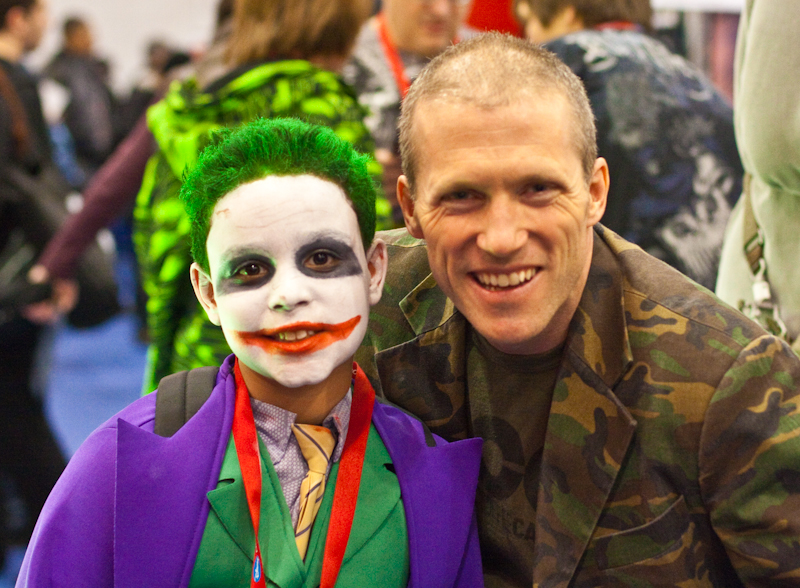
Watchmen photographer Clay Enos at the February 2009 convention

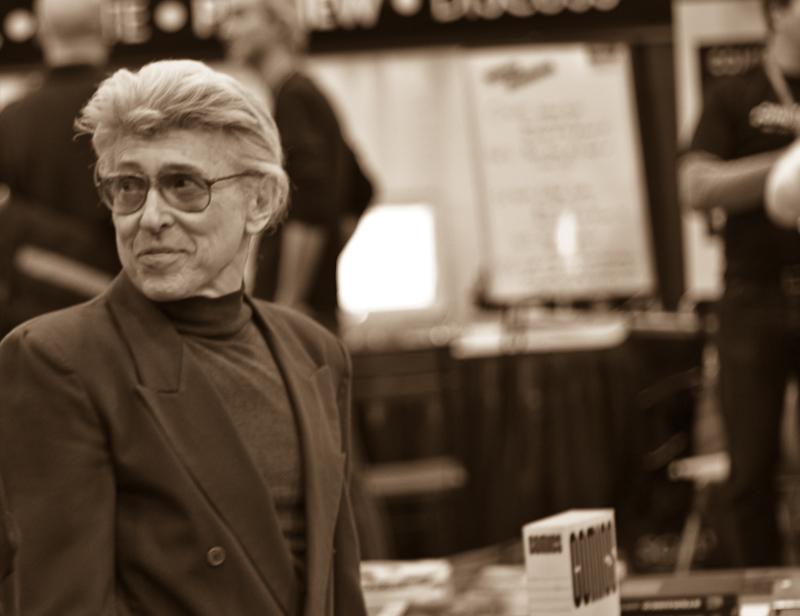
Eisner Award Hall of Fame member Jim Steranko at the February 2009 convention

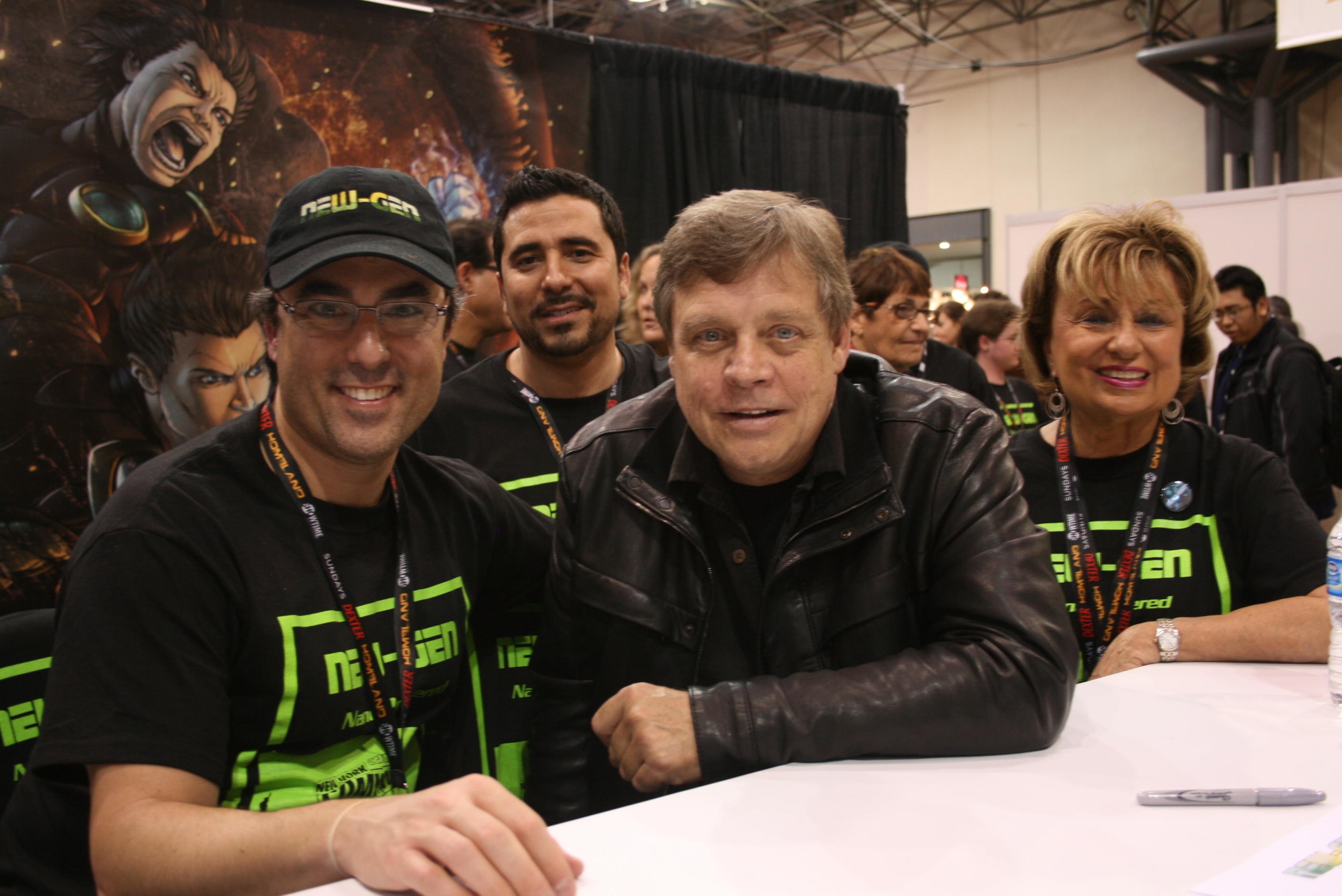
NEW-GEN Creators J.D. Matonti, Chris Matonti, and Julia Coppola with NEW-GEN Creative Consultant Mark Hamill at the October 2011 convention

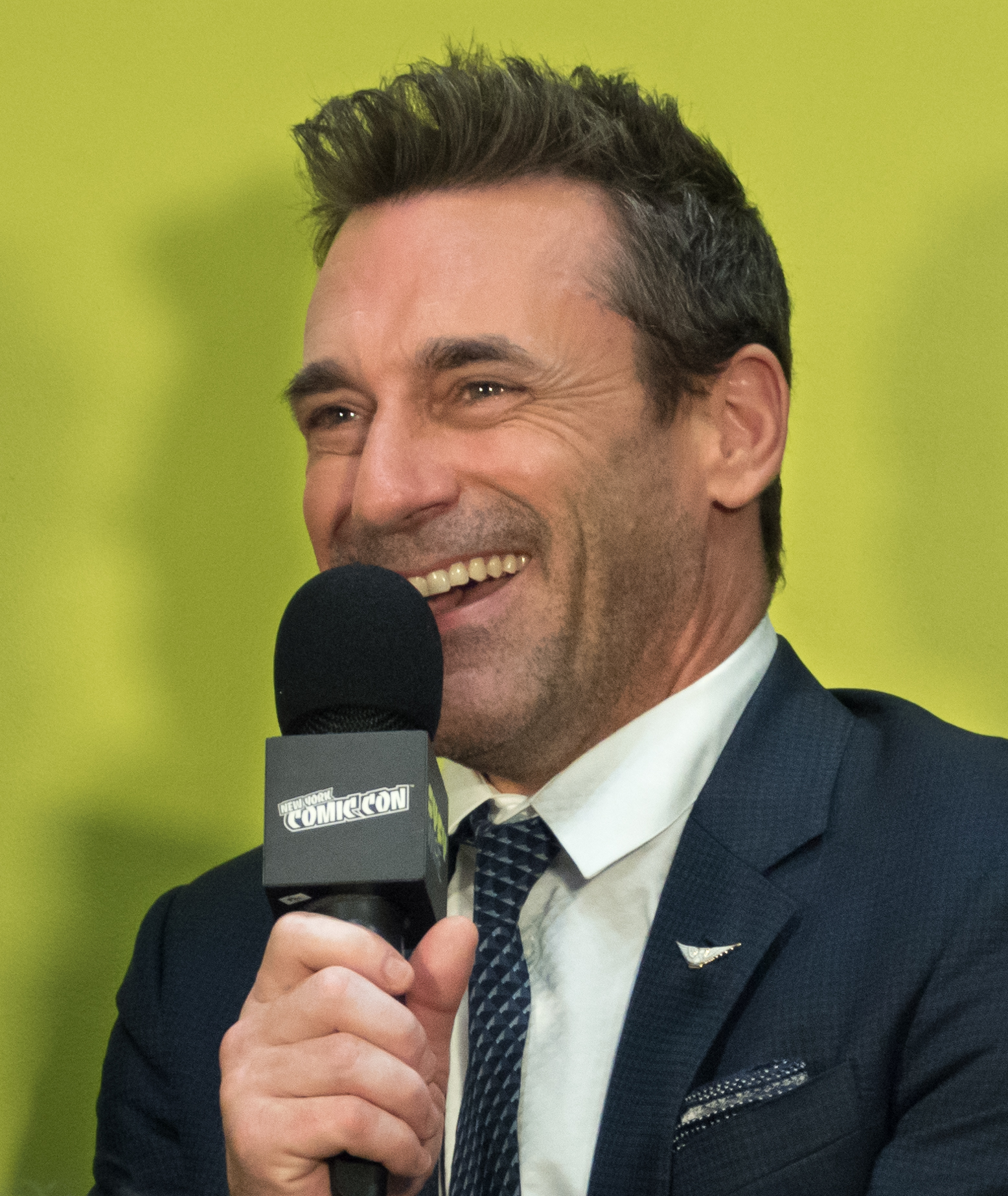
Jon Hamm on a 2018 panel for the Good Omens miniseries

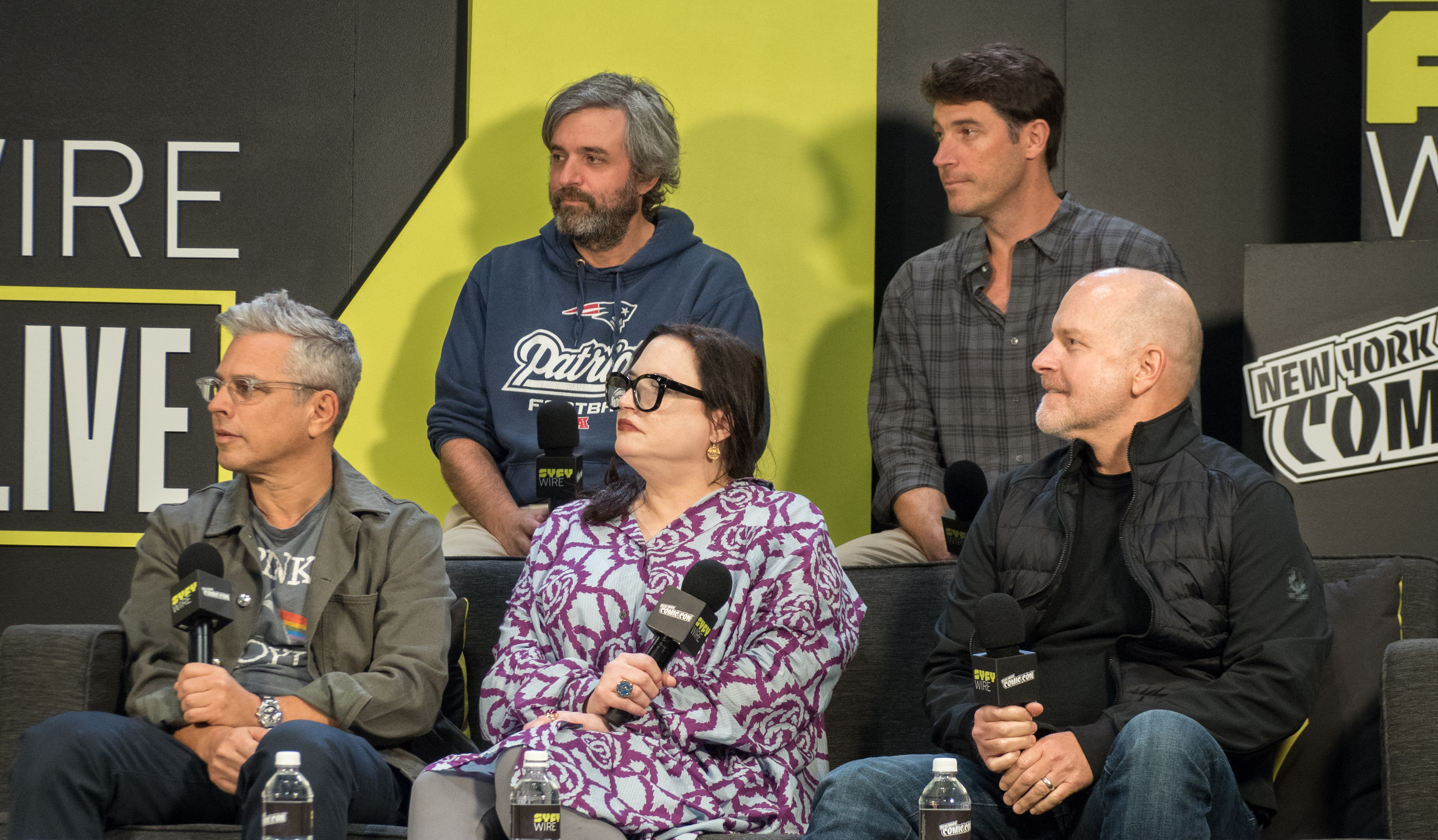
Family Guy panel in 2018

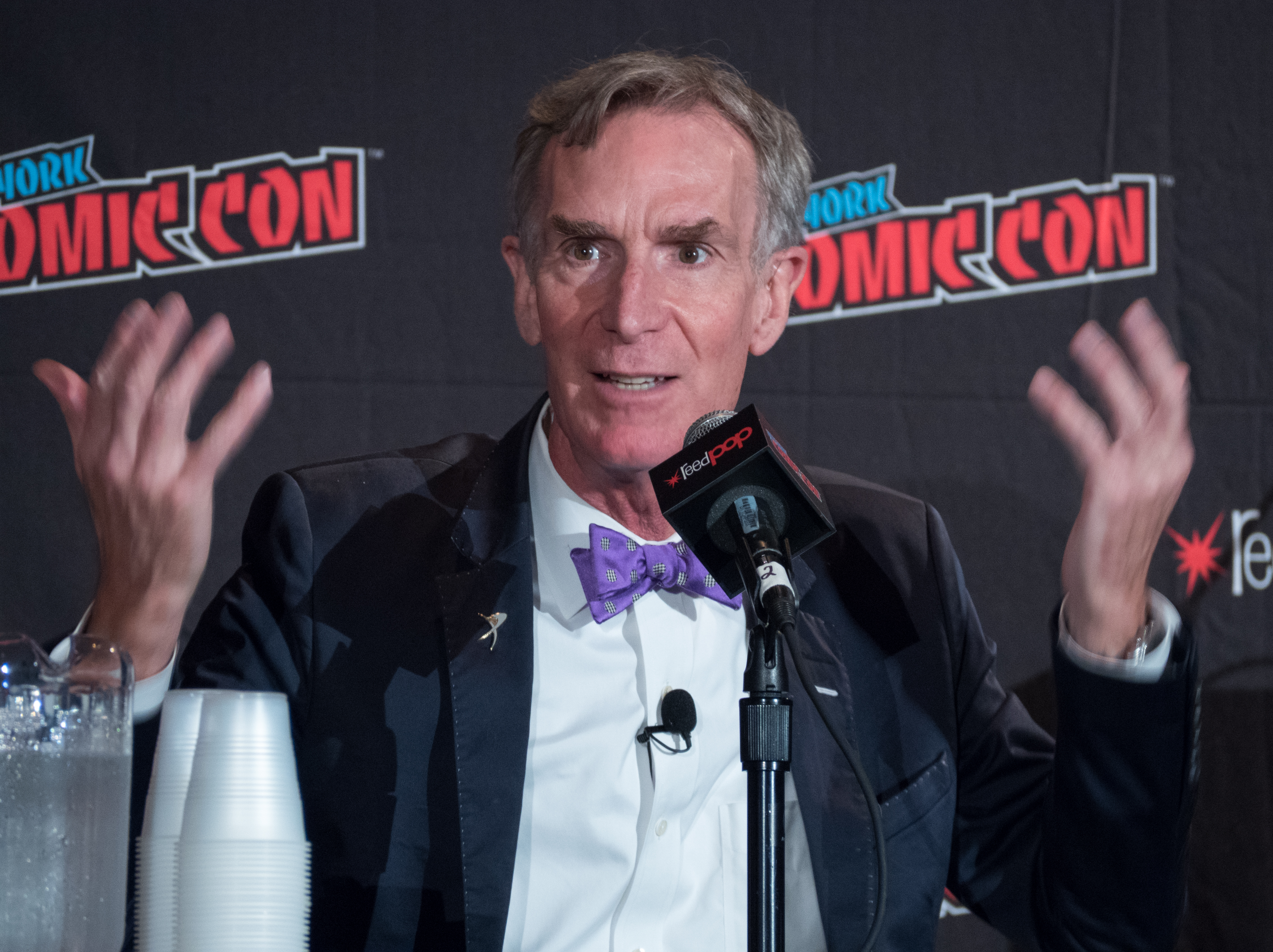
Bill Nye on a "Science or Fiction" panel in 2018

== See also ==
- Big Apple Comic Con
- Oz Comic Con
- Comic Art Convention
- Phil Seuling

== Sources ==
- Duncan, Randy; Smith, Matthew J (2009). The Power of Comics: History, Form and Culture. Continuum International Publishing Group.
- Gabilliet, Jean-Paul (2010). Of Comics and Men: A Cultural History of American Comic Books. Translated by Bart Beaty; Nick Nguyen. University of Mississippi Press.
- Schelly, Bill (2010). Founders of Comic Fandom: Profiles of 90 Publishers, Dealers, Collectors, Writers, Artists and Other Luminaries of the 1950s and 1960s. McFarland.
