= Joey Batts & Them =

American hip hop group

- Origin: Connecticut, United States
- Genre: Alternative hip hop
- Years active: 2011-present
- Members: Joey Batts; Tony Volpe; John Dotson; Marty Wirt; Michael "BeatWiz" Spellman
- Website: www.joeybattsandthem.com

Joey Batts & Them is an American alternative hip hop band based out of New England. The band is known for their blend of hip hop, funk, R&B and alternative rock as well as comedic freestyle rap at their live shows.

== History ==
The band was formed in 2011 by both Batts and drummer Michael Spellman. Batts had by this time already made a name for himself in the CT and NY area as solo rap artist. He was known not only for his original music but also for his popular freestyles. Their first album, Bowtie Chronicles featured bassist Jon Coates and guitarist Dan Pilver along with Tony Volpe, Spellman and Batts. The album garnered local success and by 2013 the line-up, including John Dotson on bass and Marty Wirt on keyboards, was finalized. The band toured in support of the album and was continually writing material for their next release.

In early 2014 they released the single MonsterRaps recorded at Telefunken Studios in Connecticut. The video for the single featured fan made clips of themselves, their kids and their pets making monster faces. The single featured the new direction the band was going in; focusing less on a hard rock foundation for the music and leaning more to soulful R&B and funk elements. At this time, the band was nominated for Best Hip Hop Act in both the Connecticut Music Awards as well as the New England Music Awards.

Later in that year the band launched and successfully funded a Kickstarter campaign to record their new music for a full length sophomore album. In June 2014 they began work on what would become the album Fandalize at Casa De Warrenton Studios in Hartford, CT with producer Floyd Kellogg. The album's title is a reference to the band's fans who often put up the band's stickers wherever they can. While in the studio the band also took time to perform at several high profile festivals including the Ziontific Music Fest, The Block Island Music Fest and more.

In 2014, Batts founded the non-profit organization "Hip-Hop for the Homeless", which raises money each December from live performances by Connecticut hip-hop artists.

Fandalize took roughly six months to record, mix and master and was released on February 3, 2015 to positive reviews. The band was once again nominated in 2015 for Best Hip Hop Act in both the Connecticut Music Awards as well as the New England Music Awards where they opened the show with a live performance.

== Band members ==
- Joey Batts - lead vocals
- Tony Volpe - guitar, backing vocals
- John Dotson - bass, backing vocals
- Marty Wirt - keyboards,
- Michael "BeatWiz" Spellman - drums, percussion

== Discography ==
- Bowtie Chronicles (2012)
- MonsterRaps (single) (2014)
- Fandalize (2015)
