= Chapel Street =

Chapel Street may refer to:

- Chapel Street, Belgravia, England
- Chapel Street, Liverpool, England
- Chapel Street, Melbourne, Australia
