= High Adventure (band) =

American Rock Band

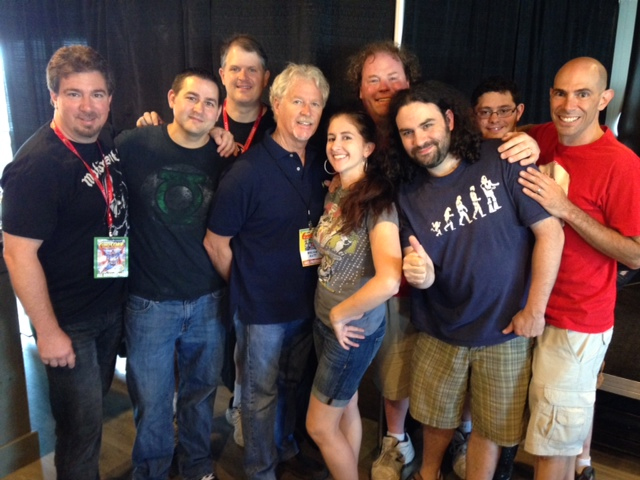
- High Adventure with William Katt at ComiCONN 2014

Background information
- Origin: Connecticut, United States
- Genres: Rock
- Years active: 2008–present
- Members: Glen Nelson; Brian Rabuse; John Dotson; Stu Sosnoski; Meghan Gillespie; Greg Kallas; Dave Bouressa; Dave Connelly
- Past members: Todd Howard; Chris Eddy
- Website: highadventuremusic.com

High Adventure is an American rock band based in Connecticut. Since 2008, they have gathered a worldwide following of fans with their passionate music about comic books, movies, video games and fandom. The band has been featured on NPR, "The Force-Cast," "The Indy-Cast," "Fanboy's Guide To The Galaxy," "The Star Wars Report," "The Star Wars Talk Show," "TechnoRetro Dads" and have played such high-profile shows as New York Comic Con, Star Wars Celebration, ComiCONN, TerrifiCon, Rhode Island Comic Con and New England Super MegaFest.

High Adventure's music has been featured in the soundtrack to the Star Wars documentary The Force Within Us and The Walking Dead documentary The Walkers Among Us.

== History ==
High Adventure was originally envisioned on May 23, 1984 by childhood friends Glen Nelson and Todd Howard. At the time, they were inspired by Indiana Jones and the Temple of Doom, and got the name from a headline in the Hartford Courant about the film. They performed popular songs at the time that they enjoyed, and also wrote original music. The duo played for several years, and expanded to a quartet with other neighborhood friends. However, after Howard moved to a different town, the band was put on hiatus.

In 2008, Nelson and Howard teamed up once again to pen the song "The Ballad Of Indiana" to commemorate the release of Indiana Jones and the Kingdom of the Crystal Skull. On the heels of this musical rebirth came an opportunity to perform live for their growing fans. Mitchell Hallock, co-host of the "Indy-Cast" and co-promoter of a then-new comic book convention in Connecticut, titled ComiCONN, asked them to perform at the event, which they did, joined by drummer Chris Eddy.

At the same time, High Adventure's music was being featured on several high-profile on-line podcasts. This exposure not only led to a worldwide fanbase, but inspired the band to release their songs as an album. Their 2010 debut album, Acoustic Prog Pop, included songs related to Star Wars, Indiana Jones, Batman, and other topics.

Following the success of Acoustic Prog Pop, High Adventure's second album, Into a Larger World, was released in 2011. Covering familiar topics as Star Wars and Indiana Jones, it also includes songs inspired by Back to the Future, Harry Potter and The Lord of the Rings. The album was the first to include guitarist Brian Rabuse. The same year, the group continued playing conventions and made their first appearance at the New York Comic Con.

In 2012 the group added several members. John Dotson joined the band on bass guitar following the departure of Todd Howard. Stu Sosnoski also joined on trombone and keyboard. In the summer of that year the group released its third album, Heroes & Villains, which consisted almost entirely of Star Wars-themed songs. In August 2012, the band played at Star Wars Celebration VI in Orlando, Florida to promote the album. In September 2012, the band was named "Nerd Band of the Week" by the website Almost Nerdy.

The following year saw the band perform at many conventions across the United States, including ComiCONN, Boston Super MegaFest, and Rhode Island Comic Con. The band, now consisting of Nelson, Rabuse, Dotson and Sosnoski, added Greg Kalls on drums, Meghan Gillespie on trumpet and vocals, Dave Bouressa on Trumpet and Dave Connelly on banjo. In late 2012 the band was asked to compose music for the soundtrack to the Star Wars documentary The Force Within Us. Combined into a single track, the music composed for the film was used as the title song for the album The Trials of Obi-Wan, released in December 2013. The album again features several Star Wars-related songs, with other songs inspired by Superman II, Battlestar Galactica, Star Trek, and Minecraft.

In March 2015 the band began recording their fifth studio album. In July 2015, the album's title was announced as High Five, and that along with the now-customary Star Wars-themed songs, it will include songs with subjects such as Back to the Future Part II, Guardians of the Galaxy, Star Trek: The Next Generation, Conan the Barbarian, and Tron. The album was released in November 2015.

== Band members ==
- Glen Nelson – lead vocals, keyboards
- Brian Rabuse – guitar, backing vocals
- John Dotson – bass, backing vocals
- Stu Sosnoski – trombone, keyboards,
- Meghan Gillespie – trumpet, backing vocals
- Greg Kallas – drums, percussion
- Dave Bouressa – Trumpet, backing vocals
- Dave Connelly – banjo, guitar

== Notable performances ==
High Adventure have been joined on stage by guests such as Jonathan Frakes, Chase Masterson and William Kircher.

At the inaugural Rhode Island Comic Con in November 2012, the band performed the opening theme of Battlestar Galactica for the show's cast. At the 2014 ComiCONN, they performed the theme song of The Greatest American Hero for William Katt, the lead actor of the series. In 2015, at TerrifiCon, the band performed one of their original songs, "The Tale Of Short Round," for actor Ke Huy Quan, who portrayed Short Round in Indiana Jones and the Temple of Doom.

== Discography ==
- Acoustic Prog Pop (2010)
- Into a Larger World (2011)
- Heroes & Villains (2012)
- The Trials of Obi-Wan (2013)
- High Five (2015)
