= Kimono Draggin' =

American prog-punk band

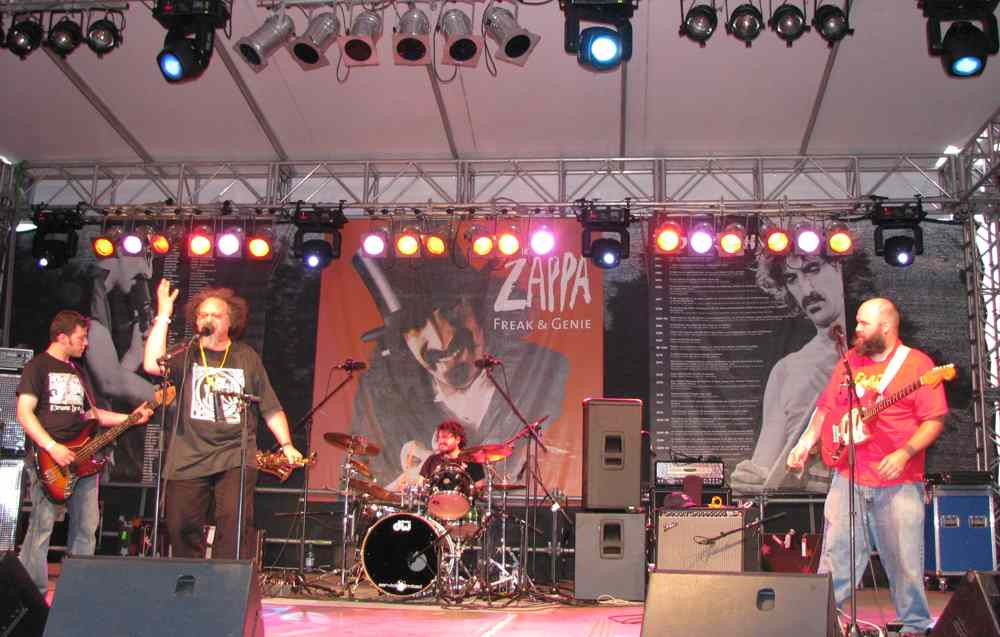
- Kimono Draggin' playing at Zappanale 18 in Bad Doberan, Germany in 2007.

Background information
- Origin: New Haven, Connecticut, USA
- Genres: Prog Punk; Art rock; indie rock; post-punk; progressive rock
- Years active: 2003-2011, 2020-present
- Labels: Kimono Music / Spaynsive Productions
- Members: Joseph Nolan (Guitar/Vocals); Joshua Hatton (Bass/Vocals); Chris Swirski (Drums/Vocals)
- Website: https://www.facebook.com/KimonoDraggin

Kimono Draggin' are an American prog-punk band formed in 2003 from New Haven, Connecticut. The lineup consists of Joseph Nolan (Guitar, vocals), Joshua Hatton (Bass, vocals), and Chris Swirski (Drums, vocals). Their version of progressive rock is strongly influenced by bands of the 1970s and 1980s including The Stooges, The Mothers of Invention, Talking Heads and Minutemen. As Patrick Ferrucci quotes, "It’s party rock with an edge and an intelligence. There’s wit and wildness just swimming around in Kimono’s music". Mark Suppanz of The Big Takeover describes the music as "...noisy, souped-up rock saturated with a healthy dose of reckless abandon and a raw, unpolished and in-your-face sound".

== History ==
Kimono Draggin' was formed by members of several New Haven–based indie bands. Upon recording their 5-song demo, titled "The Essence of Dik Chin", they began writing a rock opera that instead evolved into a script for a chopsocky mockumentary television series. The script saw the 3 musicians as moonlighting students of a martial art called Dik Chin. The story combined the band's jangly art rock with a healthy dose of humor and b-movie action. A&E Network Production Assistant, Aurelio Muraca (Nanny 911, Trading Spouses) had seen the band play in Danbury, CT and had heard the band was writing a show. After several meetings it was decided the show wouldn't come to fruition due to lack of writing interest on the band's behalf. More focused on their love of music, Kimono Draggin' pushed forward performing their own brand of Progressive rock to eccentric audiences across New England.

In early 2005, the trio recorded their first LP, "My Summer in Paris" with producer/engineer Scott Amore (of The Butterflies of Love). They supported their self-released album by touring extensively, playing historic rock venues such as the Knitting Factory and CBGB. The album received a lengthy, obscure review on Allmusic by Eugene Chadbourne and was criticized by many for its explicit lyrical content. As stated by Chadbourne in the review, "Little bits of his [Nolan's] lyrics crest to the top of the jam on golden surfboards, glowing with the essence of sheer stupidity that rock & roll thrives on."

Kimono Draggin' went back in the studio in 2007 with Scott Amore and recorded what would later become "Space Orphans", but the band became sidetracked and embarked on a European Tour. The tour was created around an invitation to perform at Zappanale 18 in Bad Doberan Germany (a music festival memorializing the late Frank Zappa). Kimono Draggin' successfully performed a mostly original set to the sea of Frank Zappa fans that stood before them. The band supported additional acts on the festival, including Frank Zappa veterans Chad Wackerman, Don Preston and Napoleon Murphy Brock. This performance gained the attention of Peter Van Laarhoven of the Belgian music magazine, United Mutations. Van Laarhoven states, "...the band has evolved quite a lot the last couple of years. The power and the Beefheart approach are still there, but it's all more balanced." During this time period the band performed live on BBC Radio Humberside with Alan Raw at their Queen's Gardens, Hull studios. The tour also saw Kimono perform memorable gigs at The Star and Garter in Manchester, England and Tapas la Movida in Nice, France.

The trio took a brief hiatus in 2008, rarely performing live. In the summer they began writing diligently and then began performing heavily around New England supporting Philo Cramer (formerly of Fear) and Richard Lloyd (formerly of Television). In the summer of 2009, Kimono Draggin' was discovered by 2 former recording students of Murray Krugman (producer of Blue Öyster Cult). Matt Labozza and Kurt Daniello invited the band into the studios at University of New Haven where they recorded their second full-length album titled "We Are The Dudes". During this time, the band decided to finally finish and release "Space Orphans" as well. In support of this double-album release, Kimono Draggin' threw a CD Release party in December 2009 performing with guests, Fighting Cocks (featuring Philo Cramer from Fear) and Continental (featuring Rick Barton formerly of Dropkick Murphys). Upon the successful release of both albums, the band filmed a music video for the song 'Ello Dudes which features the bandmates as violent troublemakers who kidnap and torture two random people. The video was inspired by the work of Stanley Kubrick. Shortly after the video's premier, the band was approached by Verbicide Magazine for a feature interview. In 2011, the band recorded their 4th full-length album,'Kimono Gold' in January.

== Split and reformation ==
The band officially split up in March 2011, ending with a greatest hits performance at BAR, New Haven. One year following their split, Chris Arnott of Daily Nutmeg named Kimono Draggin' as one of the 20 bands that shaped the sound of New Haven music. Chris Swirski and Joe Nolan continued to play music together in other projects (Space Orphans and Joe Division). Then, after 9 years of radio silence from Kimono Draggin', the band decided to reform in August 2020, after an impromptu jam. Since then, they've shared the stage with the likes of The Queers, Peelander-Z, Sponge (band) and Change Today (ex-TSOL). In 2026, they released their 5th full-length album, "I Can't Believe It's Not Music". The band are currently working on a 6th studio album, titled "Apizza Sh*t and Other Inedible Arrangements".

== Discography ==
- The Essence of Dik Chin (EP/CD, 2003, Spaynsive Productions)
- My Summer in Paris with Kimono Draggin' (LP/CD, 2005, Spaynsive Productions)
- Kimono Draggin' LIVE at Zappanale (Unreleased, 2007, Spaynsive Productions)
- Space Orphans (LP/CD, 2006/2009, Spaynsive Productions)
- We Are the Dudes (LP/CD, 2009, Spaynsive Productions)
- Bobbie Peru/Kimono Draggin' Split EP (EP/Vinyl, 2010, Spaynsive Productions)
- Kimono Gold (LP/Vinyl, 2011, Spaynsive Productions)
- I Can't Believe It's Not Music (LP/Vinyl, 2026, Kimono Music/Spaynsive Productions)
