= Shirish Korde =

Ugandan composer

Shirish Korde (born June 18, 1945) is a Ugandan composer of Indian ancestry. He is the Chair of the Music Department at the College of the Holy Cross in Worcester, Massachusetts. He has previously been on the faculty of the Berklee College of Music, the New England Conservatory, and Brown University. Korde studied jazz and composition at the Berklee College of Music, analysis and composition at the New England Conservatory, and ethnomusicology at Brown University.

== Works ==
His works include:

- Tenderness of Cranes, for solo flute, influenced by Japanese shakuhachi techniques
- Time Grids, for amplified guitar and tape
- Constellations, for saxophone quartet
- Drowned Woman of the Sky, a song cycle based on poems by Pablo Neruda
- Nesting Cranes (2006), for solo flute and strings, premiered by Jennifer Gunn and the Chicago Symphony Orchestra under Ludovic Morlot
- Svara-Yantra (2005), a violin concerto premiered by the Polish National Radio Symphony Orchestra with soloist Joanna Kurkowicz, who also played the American premiere
- Songs of Ecstasy (2008)
- Zikhr: Songs of Longing (2009) for soprano, flute, string trio, harp, tabla and percussion, premiered by the Chameleon Arts Ensemble of Boston

Korde has composed five large-scale music-theatre works:

- Chitra (2003), commissioned by Boston Musica Viva and premiered by that ensemble at a concert sponsored by the Celebrity Series of Boston
- Rasa (1999)
- Bhima's Journey
- The Separate Prison
- The Conquistadors
- Phoolan Devi: The Bandit Queen (2010), a multi-media opera based on the life of Phoolan Devi based on a libretto he authored with Lynn Kremer, who directed the premiere performances by Boston Musica Viva at Boston University's Tsai Performance Center.
- Aède Of The Ocean And Land (based on Noor Inayat Khan's play of the same title) was premiered live with the Athens based ODC Ensemble and 20 performers from 4 different countries in September 2020

These works exhibit influences of Asian dramatic and musical forms, especially Balinese gamelan and shadow puppetry, Vedic chant, Tuva music from Central Asia, North Indian Tala, and shakuhachi music. Jazz elements and computer voice synthesis techniques are also incorporated into his music-theater works. Korde also composed KA, for the Boston Musica Viva, a work for cello and voice (cellist Jan Müller-Szerwas and Deepti Navaratna, soprano) – Anusvara, Fifith Prism. He also composed a guitar concerto, Nada Ananda, released on CD featuring Simon Thacker and his ensemble. In 2021, Korde is working on a symphonic piece inspired by climate change, " Oceans Rising for the South Asian Symphony Orchestra." He was also a resident composer at the 2021 Seal Bay Festival.

He was described by Computer Music Journal as one of the few "contemporary composers who have been deeply touched by music of non-Western cultures, jazz, and computer technology and who has created a powerful and communicative compositional language."

Korde is the founder of Neuma Records.

== Awards and grants ==
- The National Flute Association
- Composers Inc.
- The Fuller Foundation
- The Lef Foundation
- The Fromm Foundation
- The Massachusetts Council for the Arts
- New England Foundation for the Arts
- The Mellon Foundation
- The Artists Foundation
- Saint Botolph Club Foundation Award
- Mass Cultural Council- 2021 Artist Fellowship Awards
