= Patrick Greene (composer) =

- Born: March 10, 1985 (age 41); Madison, Connecticut, United States
- Genre: Contemporary classical music
- Occupations: Composer; Singer; Conductor
- Years active: 2003–present
- Website: patrickgreenecomposer.com

Patrick Greene (born 1985) is an American composer and performer of contemporary classical music. A lifelong resident of New England, he has been based in Boston, Massachusetts, since 2008.

== Education ==
Greene earned his MM in Composition from the Boston Conservatory in May 2010, where his primary teachers were Andy Vores and Dalit Warshaw. While at the Conservatory, he also studied with Jan Swafford and Curtis Hughes. His undergraduate career was at Trinity College, where he earned his B.A. in Music in 2007. His primary teachers at Trinity were Gerald Moshell and Douglas Bruce Johnson.

== Musical style ==
In writing about Greene's style, Jonathan Blumhofer of the Boston Classical Review notes "his musical language is ... diverse," with a "wide emotional breadth.". His music has been called "undeniably expressive and smartly crafted."

Greene has described his music as "extractive," rather than "abstractive," while still noting the unique expressive power of music as an abstract medium.

In interviews, Greene has cited the work of composers like Maurice Ravel, Steven Stucky, Igor Stravinsky, Toru Takemitsu, and Charles Ives as inspiration; he also draws influence from Anglican choral traditions and rock bands such as Radiohead and Tool.

== Major pieces ==
Recent projects include Mabinte, a co-composition with the percussionist/composer Ryan Edwards. Commissioned by the Boston Landmarks Orchestra, it paired the orchestral musicians with dozens of young members of Greater Boston Boys and Girls Clubs, and featured choreography by Brian Mirage. It premiered in the Hatch Memorial Shell on the Charles River Esplanade in the summer of 2016.

Greene's song cycle Year of Glad, based on erasure poetry by Jenni B. Baker from David Foster Wallace's Infinite Jest, premiered in Chicago in spring 2016. Other recent vocal works include "Come soon, you feral cats", a cycle on the poetry of W. S. Di Piero written for and premiered by the New York-based loadbang ensemble.

He has collaborated with Boston Musica Viva numerous times—most recently in 2019, when they premiered The Druddigon, a ballet with a libretto by noted young adult author M.T. Anderson. Another collaboration with the ensemble, Machine Language for Beginners, explores humanity's complicated history with machines and artificial intelligence; it earned him the St. Botolph Club Foundation's 2015 Emerging Artist Award.

Steel Symphony, a 2013 composition for virtuoso organ, has been performed extensively across the United States. Composed for Christopher Houlihan, it gained special praise in the New York Times.

Greene won the Rapido! New England Composition Contest in October 2010 with his chamber piece abstractEXTRACTION, premiered by the Boston Musica Viva at Boston University's Tsai Performing Arts Center. At the 2011 Rapido! Take Two!! National Finals in Atlanta, Georgia, the same piece garnered the Internet Audience Favorite Award. In 2007, he was commissioned by the New Haven Symphony Orchestra for two new works: a large choral/orchestral piece based on the spiritual God's Gonna Set This World on Fire, and a wind quintet based on the Kenyan folk song "Kwaharree." After fulfilling a number of commissions for various ensembles at Trinity College, he received a large-scale choral/orchestral commission for performance in 2011. He also recently composed the official anthem of the college's Cornerstone Campaign, a $32.9 million-dollar restoration project.

His orchestral thesis at the Conservatory, Night of the Four Zoas, was premiered by Yoichi Udagawa in Boston in the spring of 2010. Based on the mythopoetic writings of William Blake, Night of the Four Zoas marks the composer's third Blake-derived piece. His recent trumpet/cello/piano trio, Maxwell's Demon, was premiered in Cambridge, Massachusetts, in the fall of 2010. Other recent pieces include his Variations for String Quartet (2009–10), No Oblivion (solo clarinet, 2010), The Pieces That Fall to Earth (solo singers with chamber orchestra on the poetry of A.R. Ammons, Stephen Crane, and T.S. Eliot, 2010), Inclinado en las tardes (SATB, on the poetry of Pablo Neruda, 2010), and The City in the Sea: Landscape for 15 Strings (string orchestra, 2008).

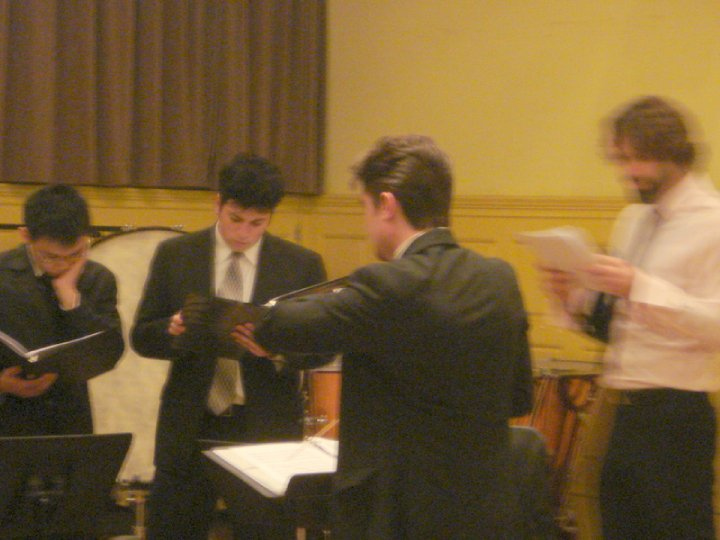
Conducting a rehearsal of his music in Boston, April 2010

== List of works ==
=== Full orchestra ===
- "Mabinte" (12', 2016) Collaborative composition with percussionist/composer Ryan Edwards, commissioned by the Boston Landmarks Orchestra and featuring young musicians and dancers from Greater Boston Boys and Girls Clubs.
- "Gift: Choral Symphony on the Poetry of Hugh Ogden" (Chamber Arrangement, 15', 2011) | Commissioned by Trinity College Chapel Music
- Night of the Four Zoas (20’, 2009–10)
- God's Gonna Set This World On Fire (high school choir with orchestra, 2008) Commissioned by the New Haven Symphony Orchestra.
- Two Movements for Orchestra from Water in Music: A Psychoacoustical Study (10’, 2006) Component of Undergraduate Thesis Project,
- In Medias Res (8’, 2005)

=== Chamber orchestra ===
- Gift (choir and chamber orchestra, 40', 2011) Commissioned by John Rose and the Trinity College Department of Music on a cycle of poems by Hugh Ogden.
- The Pieces That Fall to Earth (with baritone and soprano soloists, 16’, 2009–10) On poems by A.R. Ammons, T.S. Eliot, and Stephen Crane.
- The City in the Sea: Landscape for 15 Strings (string orchestra, 9’, 2009) Commissioned by Yohei Sato. Inspired by a poem by Edgar Allan Poe.

=== Small ensembles ===
- The Druddigon (flute/piccolo, clarinet in Bb/bass clarinet, violin, cello, percussion, piano, narrator, 35', 2019) Ballet commissioned by Boston Musica Viva for their 50th anniversary season's Family Concert. Story and libretto by M.T. Anderson; staging and choreography by Denise Cecere
- Machine Language for Beginners (flute, clarinet, percussion, piano, violin, viola, cello, 15', 2015) Chamber suite on artificial intelligence, composed for Boston Musica Viva.
- Triptych III. Comprehensive Research (violin, viola, cello, 7.5', 2015) Third movement of collaboratively composed piece on the poetry of Daniil Kharms.
- Come soon, you feral cats (bass clarinet, C trumpet, trombone, baritone voice, 20', 2015) Composed for loadbang ensemble. Settings of the poetry of W.S. Di Piero.
- The Hedgehog's Dilemma (violin, horn in F, piano, 2', 2014) Winner of the Red Hedgehog Trio's inaugural Call for Scores.
- The Tower (bass clarinet, C trumpet, trombone, baritone voice, digital audio, live actress, 40', 2014) Composed for loadbang ensemble. Setting of an original one-act play by Kevin Kordis.
- Eventually, everything connects (clarinet in B flat, two marimbas, and violin, 2013) Premiered by Balletik Duo and Transient Canvas. Exploration of the works of Charles and Ray Eames. Expansion of Charles & Ray (see below).
- Charles & Ray (clarinet in B flat and marimba, 5', 2012) Premiered by Transient Canvas. Exploration of the works of Charles and Ray Eames.
- The Tortoise and the Hare (modified Pierrot ensemble, mixed percussion ensemble, and narrator, 27', 2011–12) Commissioned by Boston Musica Viva and Marimba Magic. Libretto by Christopher Pickett.
- Maxwell's Demon (trumpet in C, cello, piano, 15’, 2010) Commissioned by Stuart Terrett. Exploration of the thermodynamics thought experiment of the same name.
- AbstractEXTRACTION (flute, clarinet in Bb, cello, piano, 5’, 2010) Winner of the 2010 Rapido! New England Competition. Exploration of the works of Alexander Calder.
- Variations for String Quartet (12’, 2008–10)
- Characters (two scherzandi for trombone trio, 4’, 2009). Inspired by commedia dell'arte.
- Missa Brevis (three male voices, 11’, 2008–9) Commissioned by The Elmsmen.
- How sweet I roam’d (three male voices, 4’, 2008) Commissioned by The Elmsmen. On a poem by William Blake.
- Kwaharree (wind quintet, 6’, 2007–8) Commissioned by the New Haven Symphony Wind Quintet. Arrangement and expansion of a traditional Kenyan folksong.

=== Choral ===
- Lo, How a Rose E'er Blooming (SATB choir, 5', 2017) | Commissioned by the Skylark Ensemble
- Logos (male trio, SATB choir, narrator, and organ, 8', 2016) | Commissioned by John Rose for the Trinity College Chapel Singers, The Elmsmen, Christopher Houlihan, and numerous additional singers from the Trinity College choral network
- Hark, the Glad Sound! (SATB, 4', 2012) Commissioned by John Rose for the Choirs of Trinity College.
- i carry your heart(i carry it in) (SATB, 6', 2012) Commissioned for a wedding. On a poem by E.E. Cummings.
- Love (ATB, 9', 2011) Commissioned for a wedding. On a poem by Billy Collins.
- My Dearest Friend (SATB, 4', 2011) Commissioned for a wedding. Text taken from a letter from Abigail Adams to John Adams.
- Ubi Caritas (SATB motet, 3’, 2010) Commissioned by Joseph Marchio for the Cantata 4.
- The Lord Bless You and Keep You (SATB, 3’, 2010) Commissioned by John Rose for the Trinity College Chapel Singers.
- The Long Walk (choir with orchestra, 4’, 2010) Commissioned as the anthem for the Trinity College Long Walk restoration project.
- Inclinado en las tardes (SATB, 7’, 2009)
- Apache Wedding Prayer (SATB, 4’, 2010) Commissioned by Emmanuel Espiritu.
- The Shepherd (Children's choir with accompaniment, 4’, 2010) Commissioned by Joseph Marchio for the Pleasant Bay Children's Chorus. On a poem by William Blake.
- Dodi Li (SATB, 4’, 2008) Commissioned for a wedding.
- Irish Blessing (SATB, 3’, 2008) Commissioned for a wedding.
- Life Is Song (male choir, 7’, 2007)
- Requiem Mass (SSAATTBB choir with divisi, 12’, 2005)
- The Fly (SSAATTBB choir with divisi, 5’, 2004–5) On a poem by William Blake.

=== Songs ===
- "Year of Glad" (soprano and piano, 15', 2016) On erasure poetry from David Foster Wallace's "Infinite Jest" by Jenni B. Baker. Commissioned by Joelle Kross.
- "Ferncliff" (soprano and piano, 6', 2011)
- Hymn (baritone and piano, 8’, 2009) On a poem by A.R. Ammons.
- Songs of Stasis (soprano and piano, 10’, 2008) On poems by T.S. Eliot and Stephen Crane.

=== Solo instruments ===
- But not until it is finished with you (cello, 10', 2017) Commissioned by Laura Usiskin.
- Steel Symphony (organ, 13', 2013) Commissioned by Christopher Houlihan. Based on sculptures on display at the deCordova Museum and Sculpture Park in Lincoln, Massachusetts.
- No Oblivion (solo clarinet in Bb, 8’, 2010) Commissioned by Kathleen LeBlanc-Hood. Based on a poem by the Greek poet Sappho.
- Granitic (meantone piano, 4’, 2010)
- Etudes for Solo Harp (harp, 6', 2010) Commissioned by Izabella Angelova.
- Recessional Fanfare (organ, 4', 2008)

=== Electronics ===
- JUICY: Spectral Studies for a Citrus Juicer (6.5', 2014)
- Fuzzy Logic (10', 2012)
- Vox Populi (6’, 2010)
