= Christopher Tsai =

Chinese-American investor and art collector

- Born: Christopher Tsai; December 20, 1974 (age 51); Greenwich, Connecticut, United States
- Education: Middlebury College (BA)
- Occupation: Investor
- Spouse: André Stockamp
- Children: 2
- Parent(s): Gerald Tsai; Marlyn C. Tsai
- Website: Tsai Capital

Christopher Tsai (born December 20, 1974) is a Chinese-American investor and noted art collector. He is the founder of Tsai Capital Corporation, a New York-based investment management firm.

== Early life and education ==
Born in Greenwich, Connecticut, to investor and philanthropist Gerald Tsai and model and actress Marlyn C. Tsai, Tsai was raised in a prominent family with connections to influential figures in business and real estate. He attended Brunswick School, a private college-preparatory school for boys in Greenwich, graduating in 1993. During his youth, Tsai was close with the Trump family, as his father was acquainted with Donald Trump when Trump was a Manhattan real estate mogul, and Tsai considered Donald Trump Jr. his best friend, often vacationing together. Tsai began his career in finance at the age of 11, working for the Tsai family foundation. As a teenager, he would regularly telephone Alan Courtney "Ace" Greenberg, who managed a custodian account for Tsai, to ask him why he was buying certain companies like Schlumberger. Tsai also had the opportunity to learn from other Wall Street CEOs like Laurence Tisch, who was his sister’s godfather. At age 18, Tsai studied securities analysis at the New York Institute of Finance.

Tsai attended Vermont's Middlebury College, where he graduated with a Bachelor of Arts degree in Philosophy and International Politics and served on the Middlebury College Arts Council.

== Career ==
=== Early investment experience ===
Tsai began investing at the age of 11 when he purchased five shares of an insurance company. He used money he made from gardening for the investment and made a $25 profit. Tsai recounts he convinced the broker to waive the fee for the transaction as it was more than the profit he made from the investment.

At the age of 16, Tsai began informally investing money for friends and business owners he knew from growing up in Greenwich. One of those “clients” was the owner of a Chinese restaurant who entrusted Tsai with his life savings of around $400,000. That early investor became one of Tsai’s first clients when he started his firm.

Tsai launched Tsai Capital in 1997 after working as an equity analyst for Bear Stearns and interning for value investors Mario Gabelli and John A. Levin. Tsai credits Benjamin Graham's The Intelligent Investor and Philip Arthur Fisher's Common Stocks and Uncommon Profits as two of his influences. His investment approach was also strongly influenced by Charlie Munger of Berkshire Hathaway.

=== Tsai Capital Corporation ===
Tsai is president and chief investment officer of Tsai Capital, an SEC-registered, value-oriented investment firm headquartered in New York City and focused on the long-term growth and preservation of capital. He founded the company in 1997 at the age of 22 and serves as chairperson of the firm's advisory committee.Tsai Capital manages concentrated portfolios of high-quality growth equities for high-net-worth individuals, family offices, and institutions.

Among the firm’s larger and longer-standing positions has been Tesla, first purchased in early 2020; the holding has been discussed by Tsai in interviews as a multi-year compounder linked to autonomy, robotics, and artificial-intelligence capabilities.Tsai has also maintained exposure to companies associated with serial entrepreneur Brad Jacobs (businessman), beginning with the 2011 investment group that acquired Express-1 Expedited Solutions (later part of XPO) and continuing with later vehicles such as QXO.

=== Value Investing 4.0 ===
In May 2026, Tsai published a white paper titled "Value Investing and the Emerging 4.0", in which he outlined an evolutionary framework for value investing. He described Value Investing 4.0 as building on Benjamin Graham's asset-based approach (1.0), the quality and compounding focus of Warren Buffett and Charlie Munger (2.0), and ecosystem/platform models (3.0). In this framework, intelligence itself becomes the economic moat (the "edge") and scalable digital labor the core output. These capabilities are typically incubated inside profitable platform businesses and require even longer time horizons, probabilistic thinking, and rigorous analysis to distinguish visionary infrastructure from hype.In a July 2026 interview with MarketWatch, Tsai applied the framework to companies such as Tesla and SpaceX, arguing that high current valuations can still represent value when future earnings power is properly considered.

=== Media and publications ===
Tsai has written for "Investment & Pensions Europe" about art as an alternative investment class, and he is the author of "Back Door to China", published in Worth, in which he favors investment in Chinese contemporary art. Bloomberg, L.P. notes that he "has also been interviewed on Bloomberg Radio, China Money Network, Fox Business, [and] The Street.com TV", and "has written extensively about investing in emerging markets". Tsai is the author of "Investing in an Age of Disruption", in which Tsai argues that investors continually underestimate the speed at which disruption, or disruptive innovation, transforms business and society. Tsai is also the author of "The Power and Challenges of Compounding", in which Tsai states investors should think long-term and recognize that even the most exceptional businesses go through difficult periods and growing pains. In a 2025 interview with Business Insider, Tsai praised Elon Musk, calling him “one of the greatest entrepreneurs of our time” for his innovative leadership at Tesla, SpaceX, and Neuralink, highlighting Musk’s impact on technology and business.

=== Other business ventures ===
In 2011, Tsai joined an investor group, led by Brad Jacobs (businessman), that took control of Express-1 Expedited Solutions (now XPO, Inc.). The group provided $150 million of financing.

In 2014, Tsai launched Tsai Ventures, the venture capital arm of Tsai Capital. CrowdTangle, a Tsai Ventures portfolio company, was acquired by Facebook on Nov. 11, 2016. Founded in 2012, CrowdTangle had raised $2.2 million in venture funding from Tsai Ventures and other venture capital firms.

== Art collection ==
Tsai is an avid art collector. Tsai first focused on collecting contemporary Chinese art. Tsai is the world's largest collector of works by Ai Weiwei. In 2006, Tsai commissioned Ai and the Swiss-based architectural firm, HHF Architects, to design a private residence in Upstate New York that would serve as an exhibition space for the Stockamp Tsai Collection. Following completion of the main house, Tsai commissioned Ai to build a guest house, which won an American Architecture Awards in 2013. The main residence, known as the Tsai Residence, was later sold; it changed hands for a reported $4.25 million around 2013 and again for approximately $4.9 million in 2021. Tsai attributes his love of art to his father who collected works by Alexander Archipenko, Alexander Calder and Joan Mitchell. Through the Stockamp Tsai Collection, Tsai regularly contributes artwork to museums. These museums have included the Metropolitan Museum of Art in New York, the Pérez Art Museum Miami, the Victoria and Albert Museum in London and the National Gallery of Victoria in Melbourne.

Prior to deciding to build a collection around Ai, Tsai collected contemporary Chinese art broadly, beginning in 2003. Tsai traveled to China and acquired some 50 works by artists including Fang Lijun, Liu Xiaodong, Xie Nanxing, Zhang Huan and Zhang Xiaogang. In September 2004, Tsai published an article in Worth Magazine arguing that contemporary Chinese art was undervalued. In 2005, Tsai reiterated that contemporary Chinese art was undervalued, particularly when compared with contemporary Mexican artists.

Tsai adheres to a well-defined methodology in making art acquisitions, balancing instinct and analysis. Tsai has expressed interest in collecting the work of David Hammons and Berlinde De Bruyckere. Tsai prefers that the artwork he buys stays undervalued for as long as possible. Tsai stated, "It's like buying shares in a company that you know will be worth more in five or ten years. The last thing we want is for the stock to go up as we start buying." Tsai has been critical of art speculators looking to buy art for short-term financial gain.

== Personal life ==
Tsai is a third-generation investor whose financial roots date back to World War II. In addition to Tsai being the son of Gerald Tsai, his grandmother, Ruth Tsai, was a pioneer for women in Shanghai. During World War II, Tsai's grandmother was the only woman to trade on the floor of the Shanghai Stock Exchange until Japanese troops occupied the Shanghai International Settlement on December 8, 1941, and trading was abruptly halted. Tsai is married to André Stockamp.

Tsai is a philanthropist whose giving has focused primarily on the arts and cultural institutions. He has supported organizations including the Asia Society, the Solomon R. Guggenheim Museum, the Hirshhorn Museum and Sculpture Garden, the Jewish Museum (Manhattan) (where he has been identified as a founding member of the Contemporary Circle), the Museum of Modern Art, the Serpentine Gallery, and the World Monuments Fund. Through the Stockamp Tsai Collection, he has also lent works to major museums such as the Metropolitan Museum of Art, the Pérez Art Museum Miami, the Victoria and Albert Museum, and the National Gallery of Victoria.

== See also ==
- Tsai Performance Center
