= The Fifth Floor Collective =

The Fifth Floor Collective is a Boston-based composers' consortium. Founded in 2009, the Collective is dedicated to the creation and performance of new music, with an emphasis on introducing modern classical music to new audiences in the greater Boston area.

== Members ==
The Collective was founded by Andrew Paul Jackson (b. 1984), a recent graduate of The Boston Conservatory's MM program. Four of the five founding members remain in the group as of December 2010: Jackson, Joseph M. Colombo (b. 1989), Craig Pellet (b. 1985), and Patrick Greene (b. 1985). All four Collective members graduated from the Boston Conservatory.

== Mission ==
According to the group's official website:

The Fifth Floor Collective is a Boston area composers’ consortium that produces concerts featuring works by its founders and their contemporaries. . .

To expand their audience base, the Fifth Floor has undertaken a number of efforts:

- Staging repeat performances of pieces within a season, so that audiences have more than just one chance to listen to their performances.
- Inviting at least one outside composer to each concert.
- Holding an international Call for Scores.

== See also ==
- Patrick Greene (composer)
- Andy Vores

== Notes ==
- https://newmusicusa.org/nmbx/seven-league-boots/
- https://calendar.artsboston.org/organization/the-fifth-floor-collective/
- https://www.classical-scene.com/2011/10/22/fifth-floor-collabortive/
- https://newmusicusa.org/nmbx/fellow-travelers/
