= Boston Musica Viva =

American music ensemble

Boston Musica Viva is a Boston, Massachusetts-based music ensemble founded by its music director, Richard Pittman, in 1969 and dedicated to contemporary music.

== Composers and compositions ==
In its 57-year history, Boston Musica Viva has performed more than 600 works by over 250 composers. These include over 105 works written specifically for BMV, over 240 world premieres, and over 75 Boston premieres. Among the composers whose work the ensemble has performed are Pulitzer Prize-winners Ellen Taaffe Zwilich John Harbison, Joseph Schwantner and Steven Stucky.

== World premieres ==
Boston Musica Viva has presented the world premieres of Thea Musgrave’s opera The Mocking-Bird, John Harbison’s A Full Moon in March, Theo Loevendie’s Gassir, the Hero, Martin Brody’s Heart of a Dog, and John Eaton’s Traveling with Gulliver.

== Touring ==
In addition to its Boston concert season, Boston Musica Viva’s touring engagements have taken them to Lincoln Center, the Library of Congress, the Weill Recital Hall at Carnegie Hall, the 92nd Street Y, Tanglewood, the University of California at Berkeley, and the University of Michigan. The ensemble has made eleven tours of Europe, making appearances that included the Settembre Musica Festival in Turin, Italy, and two performances in the Rózsadomb neighborhood of Budapest on a State Department tour in 1981.

Boston Musica Viva has recorded for the Albany, Neuma, Delos, CRI, Nonesuch, Newport Classic and Northeastern Records labels.

Boston Musica Viva received an Aaron Copland Fund grant in 1993 and in 2003, the ensemble received the ASCAP/Chamber Music America Award for Adventurous Programming.

== Partial list of composers with works premiered or performed by Boston Musica Viva ==
- John Cage
- Elliott Carter
- Peter Child
- Osvaldo Golijov
- Patrick Greene
- John Harbison
- Donald Harris
- Bernard Hoffer
- Shirish Korde
- William Kraft
- Gyorgy Kurtag
- Joyce Mekeel
- Frederic Rzewski
- Gunther Schuller
- Joseph Schwantner
- Ralph Shapey
- Rand Steiger
- Steven Stucky
- Andy Vores
- Jörg Widmann
- Chen Yi
- Evan Ziporyn
- Ellen Taaffe Zwilich

== Current and former members of Boston Musica Viva ==
=== Violin ===
- Bayla Keyes
- Danielle Maddon
- Cecile Garcia-Moeller
- Mary Crowder Hess

=== Viola ===
- Willine Thoe
- Katherine Murdock

=== Cello ===
- Jan Mueller-Szeraws
- Ronald Thomas
- Bruce Coppock

=== Contrabass ===
- Carolyn Davis Fryer

=== Flute ===
- John Heiss (1969–74)
- Fenwick Smith
- Renee Krimsier
- Mauricio Garcia
- Alicia DiDonato (2003–2008)
- Ann K. Bobo (2008–present)

=== Oboe ===
- Nancy Dimock

=== Clarinet ===
- William Kirkley

=== Bassoon ===
- Greg Newton

=== French horn ===
- Rick Menaul
- Bob Marlatt
- Jean Rife

=== Trumpet ===
- Steve Banzaert

=== Trombone ===
- Robert Couture

=== Timpani ===
- Jeffrey Fischer

=== Percussion ===
- Robert Schulz
- Dean Anderson

=== Piano ===
- Hugh Hinton
- Geoffrey Burleson
- Bruce Brubaker
- Evelyn Zuckerman

== Performers who have appeared with Boston Musica Viva ==
- Composer, conductor and pianist Rob Kapilow
- Vocalist Dominique Eade
- Mezzo-soprano Janice Felty
- Pianist Randall Hodgkinson
- Mezzo-soprano Pamela Dellal
- Soprano Elizabeth Keusch
- Soprano Emily Thorner
