= Bradley Jacobs =

Brad or Bradley Jacobs may refer to:

- Brad Jacobs (born 1985), Canadian curler and Olympic gold medalist
- Brad Jacobs (businessman) (born 1956), American businessperson, executive chairman of XPO, Inc.
- Brad Jacobs, senior editor at Us Weekly Magazine
