= Cai Zhiyong =

Cai Zhiyong may refer to:

- Gerald Tsai (蔡至勇; Cài Zhìyǒng, 1929–2008), Chinese-American billionaire investor and philanthropist
- Chua Tee Yong (蔡智勇; Cài Zhìyǒng, born 1977), Malaysian politician
