= QXO =

American publicly traded company

- Type: Public
- Traded as: QXO
- Industry: Building Materials
- Founded: 2024; 2 years ago
- Headquarters: Greenwich, Connecticut, U.S.
- Key people: Brad Jacobs (businessman) CEO
- Website: qxo.com

QXO, Inc. is an American publicly traded distributor and installer of building products based in Greenwich, Connecticut. After the acquisition of TopBuild Corp. in July 2026, QXO had approximately 28,000 employees, about 1,150 locations across the U.S. and Canada, and a fleet of more than 10,000 vehicles. QXO is North America's largest distributor and installer of insulation and second-largest publicly traded distributor of building products, with distribution across roofing, waterproofing, and lumber-related building materials.

== History ==
In June 2024, Brad Jacobs' family office and co-investors invested $1 billion into SilverSun Technologies, a small-cap publicly traded software and IT services company, through a private investment in public equity (PIPE) consisting of $900 million from Jacobs and $100 million from co-investors, including Sequoia Heritage. Jacobs, founder and former Chief executive officer of United Rentals and XPO, Inc., became chairman and chief executive officer. Renamed QXO, the company subsequently entered building products distribution and installation through acquisitions, including Beacon Roofing Supply in 2025, and Kodiak Building Partners and TopBuild in 2026.

In January 2025, QXO launched an all-cash tender offer to acquire Beacon for approximately $11 billion. After initially resisting the offer, Beacon entered into a definitive merger agreement with QXO in March 2025. QXO completed the acquisition in April 2025.

In February 2026, QXO announced an agreement to acquire Kodiak Building Partners from Court Square Capital for $2.25 billion, and the transaction closed in April 2026. Later that month, QXO announced an agreement to acquire TopBuild for $17 billion, and the transaction closed in July 2026, adding insulation distribution and installation capabilities.

In October 2026, Forbes ranked QXO 20th on its 2027 list of the Most Trusted Companies in America.

=== Products and services ===
QXO's customers include professional contractors, homebuilders, building owners, data center operators, and tradespeople in the United States and Canada. QXO sells building products, including insulation, residential and commercial roofing materials, lumber, and waterproofing. In addition, the company offers windows, doors, siding, gutters, trusses, construction supplies, and other building materials. QXO also exclusively distributes the Tri-Built brand.

Through the acquisitions of Kodiak and TopBuild, the company added installation services alongside assembly and fabrication capabilities, primarily for lumber and insulation products.

== Financial information ==
Between June 2024 and the completion of the TopBuild acquisition in 2026, QXO raised approximately $13.5 billion through equity and equity-linked financings to support acquisitions, including a $3 billion convertible preferred stock commitment led by Apollo and Temasek in 2026.

Institutional and private investors in QXO include AustralianSuper, Franklin Templeton, ICONIQ, Jorge Paulo Lemann, Liberty Mutual, Morgan Stanley Investment Management, New York State Common Retirement Fund and Orbis Investment Management.

Following its acquisitions of Beacon, Kodiak and TopBuild, QXO reported approximately $18 billion in combined revenue and nearly $2 billion in combined adjusted EBITDA for 2025, based on actual results adjusted to reflect full-year ownership of the three companies.
