= ALWC =

ALWC may refer to:

- A.L. Williams Corporation, a predecessor company of Primerica, an American life insurance and financial services company
- Accelerated low-water corrosion, the fast corrosion of steel or other materials in seawater near the low tide mark due to microbes
- American League Wild Card Game, an annual playoff game in Major League Baseball
