= Laura Schwendinger =

Mexican composer

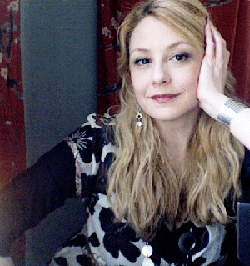
- Born: Laura Elise Schwendinger; January 26, 1962 (age 64); Mexico City
- Education: San Francisco Conservatory of Music; The Boston Conservatory; University of California at Berkeley, PhD
- Occupations: Composer; Professor of Music
- Years active: 1994-
- Spouse: Menzie Chinn
- Website: www.lauraschwendinger.com

Laura Elise Schwendinger (born January 26, 1962) was the first composer to win the American Academy in Berlin's Berlin Prize.

== Biography ==
Schwendinger was the first composer to win the American Academy in Berlin Prize, and her opera Artemisia, is the winner of the 2023, American Academy of Arts and Letters Charles Ives Opera Award, the largest such award for vocal music in the US. She is a Professor of Composition at the University of Wisconsin–Madison, where she is head of music composition. Her other awards include a 2009 Guggenheim Fellowship and fellowships from the Yaddo Colony, MacDowell, Bogliasco Foundation, Rockefeller Foundation Bellagio Conference Center, the Radcliffe Institute, First Prize 1995 ALEA III, Copland House, and awarded commissions from the Fromm and Koussevitzky Foundations, and she was an American League of Orchestras Composer-in-residence with Richmond Symphony. In 2024, Schwendinger was named the University of Utah, Abravanel Distinguished Composer. She received her Ph.D. from the University of California Berkeley, where she studied with Andrew Imbrie and Olly Wilson. Schwendinger has been invited to present her music to seminars at Harvard University, Northwestern University, the University of Chicago, Yale University, the Juilliard School, the University of California at Berkeley Davis, University of California Los Angeles. She has also been on faculty at summer programs and festivals like the Talis Festival, New Music on the Point, St. Mary's Summer Composition Intensive, Alba Music Festival, Bennington Conference, and was a Master Artist at the Atlantic center for the Arts in 2018, as well as the Guest Director of the Irish Composition Summer School in 2016.

Schwendinger was born in Mexico City D.F. Mexico. Before her position in Madison, she was a professor at the University of Illinois at Chicago, and taught at the Music Department of the University of California, Santa Cruz, Smith College and the San Francisco Conservatory of Music’s Preparatory Division, where she started a program for young composers in 1985.

== Career ==
Recent performances of her music include Ghost Music for the Chameleon Arts Ensemble (2025), a double violin concerto Nightingales (2023), premiered by the Dubuque Symphony Orchestra and the UW Symphony Orchestra, and featuring violinists Eleanor Bartsch and Ariana Kim, Fluorescenza for Matt Haimovitz's Primavera project and recorded for Oxingale, Hawk's Nest for saxophone Ensemble premiered by The Northwestern Saxophone Ensemble and subsequently performed extensively in the US and abroad and Brushstrokes, a Stony Brook premiere commission and performed by Collage New Musicof Boston on their 50th anniversary concert in 2024 and Sudden Light, a commission for Atlanta Symphony Principal harpist, Elizabeth Remy Johnson and Emory University Orchestra Program's 100th Anniversary season.

Other performances include a "Pocket Concerto" commission by Miller Theatre in New York, Chiaroscuro Azzurro, premiered by violinist Jennifer Koh and the International Contemporary Ensemble, and her cello concerto Esprimere, written for and premiered by Matt Haimovitz and the University of Wisconsin–Madison Symphony Orchestra.

Her setting of in Just- spring was performed on tour by Dawn Upshaw and Gilbert Kalish from 1997 to 2013 at venues including Carnegie Hall, Wigmore Hall in London, the Théâtre Châtelet in Paris, Morgan Library, the National Arts Center in Canada and at the Tanglewood and Ojai Music Festivals. It is available on a Naxos TDK/DVD, Voices of Our Time, with Upshaw and Kalish and was recorded at The Theatre Chatalet.

A Harvard Musical Association Commission, her String Quartet #1, was premiered by the Arditti Quartet, a Koussevitzky Foundation commission. Celestial City, which featured the dynamic young recording artist Janine Jansen with Spectrum Concerts Berlin at the Berlin Philharmoniker Kammermusiksaal, Fable and more recently High Wire Act, performed by Collage New Music at Harvard University, and a Fromm Foundation Commission, Nonet for the Chicago Chamber Musicians, which was premiered on "Live from WFMT" radio in Chicago. The Theater Chamber Players commissioned two works by Schwendinger, Songs of Heaven and Earth, and Magic Carpet Music, which were both premiered at the John F. Kennedy Center for the Performing Arts in Washington D.C.For her second Koussevitzky Foundation Commission, from the Foundation she wrote for the Chameleon Arts Ensemble in Boston, 2017.The review in the Boston Musical Intelligencer, May 21, 2017, Chameleon Paints With Music by Leon Golub read, "Schwendinger’s delightful piece effectively transformed my own gaze on the Artist’s Muse by introducing a competing muse of flesh and bone, hardship and failure, grievance and glory, behind the painter’s still-life effigy."

In more recent years, her Creature Quartet was premiered by the JACK Quartet on the Union Concert series in Madison WI, her Arc of Fire, a Chamber Music America Commission, was performed on WFMT radio in Chicago and twice at Bryant Park in New York City as part if the Chamber Music America's Classical Commissioning Program. As part of Schwendinger's League of American Orchestras New Music Alive residency with the Richmond Symphony Orchestra in 2016, her Waking Dream was performed by Mary Boodell, the principal flute of the orchestra on their Altria Masterworks series.

Her work has also been performed at Alice Tully Hall at Lincoln-Center, Times Center, Symphony Space, BargeMusic, Corcoran Gallery of Art, Institute of Advanced Study at Princeton University, Corcoran Gallery, Poisson Rouge, and the Tanglewood, Bennington, Aspen, Ravinia, and Ojai Festivals, the KOFOMI Festival in Austria, and the Talis Festival in Switzerland. Schwendinger's UnSafe Commission Shadings, for the American Composers Orchestra, was premiered at Zankel Hall in 2012, and her Seven Choral Settings were performed there as well in 2013, by Trinity Wall Street Chorus and Matt Haimovitz, conducted by Julian Wachner. In 2012, she was commissioned to write a work for Sounding Beckett at the Classic Stage Company in New York City. Jenna Scherer wrote in her Time Out review of the work, "Laura Schwendinger’s piece for Footfalls is particularly effective, featuring stretches in which the musicians play their instruments so lightly, it could just be the autumn wind blowing through their strings. Beckett’s works demand postviewing brooding, and these haunting soundscapes offer an appropriately moody place to drift."

Among her many works, in 2017 Schwendinger was commissioned by the National Flute Association to compose a work for their Young Artist Competition, for their National Conference in Minnesota. Her opera Artemisia, written with librettist Ginger Strand, was work-shopped on January 7, 2017, as part of the Time's Arrow Festival of Music at Trinity Wall Street, and conducted by Julian Wachner and supported by a National Opera Center and Opera America Discovery Grant. The Center for Contemporary Opera produced a partial performance at Symphony Space in November 2019 with Sara Tarana Jobin, conductor. The opera was then fully produced in two different world premieres (an orchestral and chamber version) in 2019.

The world premiere of the orchestral version of Artemisia by Trinity NOVUS with Christopher Alden, director and Lidiya Yankovskaya, conductor, featuring Augusta Caso, Heather Buck and Richard Troxell. The chamber world premiere of a chamber version, performed by the Left Coast Chamber Ensemble with Matilda Hofman, conducting and supported by the National Endowment for the Arts, was at Z Space in San Francisco. Corinna da Fonesca da-Wollheim, in the New York Times, praised the opera's treatment of "big themes...idea and form, image and projection, sight and gaze..with music of quivering intensity". Rebecca Wishnia, in the San Francisco Classical Voice, described the opera as "sumptuous on every level," with a "striking" score","..a breathtaking piece of worry and longing...Most memorably, the music underscores Artemisia’s deteriorating vision. Tender, high-pitched glimmers shift so as to be out of reach. The shadows are flat-sounding chords: impressionistic, but with a distinctly contemporary sensibility.” In OperaWire “Schwendinger’s score and Ginger Strand’s story not only casts its spell but awakens us again to the continuing conflict of men, women and art that has pervaded western history...The music challenges. The texture is rich.. excellent transmitter of the story. Both reveal the complexity and do not hold back from riveting us to it.”

Her second career Fromm Foundation commission for Musiqa in Houston, Cabaret of Shadows with librettist Ginger Strand, was produced in March 2022. Her work is published by Keiser Southern Music.

== Other Reviews ==
Allan Kozinn of the New York Times wrote of her Chiaroscurro Azzurro as played by Jennifer Koh:

Ms. Schwendinger's work also lives in (at least) two worlds. The violin writing, played with equal measures of energy and velvety richness by Jennifer Koh, is sometimes assertive and rhythmically sharp-edged, but those moments virtually always resolve into a sweetly singing line. The grittier orchestral writing offsets that sweetness without overwhelming it. This is a work that seems likely to blossom with repeated listening.

Colin Clarke wrote of her Creature Quartet on Albany Records CD QUARTETS, featuring the JACK Quartet, in the May/June 2018 issue of Fanfare Magazine

Gestural and yet powerfully organized, Schwendinger’s voice is highly individual. The performance by the JACK Quartet is impeccable, and as a studio recording it is technically more secure than the live Vimeo video. The sheer intensity of both music and performance thereof is spellbinding, as if the passion of the composer for her subject shines through like a light.

Richard Buell of the Boston Globe wrote in his review of her chamber work Fable,

This was shrewd composing, the genuine article. Onto the season's best list it goes" and of her String Quartet "an unmistakable lyric intensity...a fine piece...worthy of the Arditti's attention,

and later of her Magic Carpet Music as played by Collage New Music: "Schwendinger's Magic Carpet Music like the composer's other music, rejoices in edge and has a force that has its way...Here is a composer with distinct voice." Mark Kanny of the Pittsburgh Tribune wrote,

The absence of any visual entertainment for Schwendinger's Buenos Aires focused attention on the musical excellence of her hard-driving quartet for flute, bass clarinet, violin and cello. She creates fresh and compelling lines that are brought together to a powerful climax.

In her New York Times Playlist review of Schwendinger's Centaur CD High Wire Acts, Corinna da Fonseca-Wollheim wrote “in the works grouped together on this captivating disc… she sketches musical short stories of somnambulant fragility and purpose.”

== Awards ==
Beyond those already mentioned, Schwendinger has received honors from the Guggenheim Foundation, the Radcliffe Institute for Advanced Study, the American Academy of Arts and Letters, a Rockefeller Foundation Fellowship at Bellagio, Yaddo Corporation fellowships (9), MacDowell Colony fellowships (11), and the Bogliasco Liguria Conference Center, and artistic residencies at the Tyrone Guthrie Center, American Academy in Rome, as well as awards from the American League of Orchestras / New Music Alive, and awarded commissions from the Harvard Music Association, Fromm Foundation and an Opera America Discovery Grant; And was the first prize winner of the 1995 ALEA III International Composition Competition. She is one of a small number of composers to receive two Koussevitzky Foundation commissions.

== Selected works ==
- Margaret in Love and War (2026) and Opera for six voices and ensemble of flute, clarinet, violin, cello, piano, and percussion.(80:00) premiered at the Thalia Theater, Symphony Space, with Cutting Edge Concerts New Music Festival, New York, April 28, 2026.
- Cabaret of Shadows (2021) an opera for five voices and flute, clarinet, violin, cello, piano, and percussion.(50:00) A Fromm Foundation Commission for the Musiqa and premiered March 8 and 9, MATCH Houston.
- Artemisia (2019) an opera about Artemisia Gentilechi (2019) with librettist Ginger Strand (80:00). The 2023 winner of an American Academy of Arts and Letters Charles Ives Opera Award at Trinity Wall Street New York with Novus in an with orchestra at Times Arrow Festival, St. Paul's Chapel, New York on March 9,2019; In a chamber version for flute, clarinet, violin, cello, piano, and percussion with the Left Coast Chamber Ensemble at Z Space, San Francisco, June 1 and 2, 2019.
- Artist's Muse (1998) for flute, clarinet, violin, cello, piano, and percussion.(24:00)A Koussevitzky Foundation Commission for the Chameleon Arts Ensemble of Boston and premiered May 20 and 21, First Church Boston.
- Chiaroscuro Azzurro, a "Pocket concerto" commission from Miller Theater for violin and chamber orchestra (20 players). For Jennifer Koh, Premiere March 2008, Miller Theater, New York City.
- High Wire Act (2005) for flute, strings and piano. Written for and commissioned by Christina Jennings and Bright Music. Premiere November 15, 2005.
- Esprimere Concerto for cello and orchestra (2005) Written for Matt Haimovitz and the UW Symphony Orchestra. Premiere March 28, 2007.
- Celestial City (2002) For Spectrum Concerts of Berlin. A Koussevitzky Foundation Commission. Premiere was 1/22/03: Berlin Philharmonic recital Hall. (18:01) for clarinet, violin, viola, cello and piano
- String Quartet in three movements (2001) A Harvard Musical Association. Commission, The Arditti String Quartet, 1/24/03. Massachusetts Institute of Technology, Cambridge, MA. 17:36.
- Magic Carpet Music (1999) for flute, clarinet (bass), violin and cello. 13:00. Written for The Theater Chamber Players. Premiere was on December 4, 1999, at the John F. Kennedy Center for the Performing Arts.
- Chansons Innocentes: Three song set includes In Just Spring-, Hist whist, little ghost things (2000) and Tumbling-hair for voice and piano. Hildegard Publishing, available from Theodore Presser.
- from Chansons Innocente- In Just Spring- (1988) for soprano and piano. Taken on tour (1997–2002) by Dawn Upshaw and Gilbert Kalish, venues include Carnegie Hall, Wigmore Hall- London, Veteran's Wadsworth- Los Angeles, Theatre du Chatelet- Paris, Herbst Theater- San Francisco and The Tanglewod Music Festival. Also available on Voices of Our Time a recital video of Dawn Upshaw at The Theatre du Chatelet in Paris
- Fable, (1994), for flute (alto, piccolo), clarinet (bass), violin, cello, piano and percussion (15:00).* Performances include Aspen Music Festival, San Francisco Conservatory of Music New Music Ensemble, June in Buffalo and Bowdoin Festival.
- Van Gogh Nocturnes (2008) for piano solo (8:39)
- Rapture (2003) for cello and piano. (8:30) Adapted for Jens Peter Maintz, principal cellist of the Deutsches Symphonie-Orchester Berlin. Premiere 5/24/03
- Sonata for solo violin (1992) in three movements (13:00). Written for and premiered by Victor Schultz at the Ives Center for American Music.
- Songs of Heaven and Earth (1998) for mezzo-soprano, flute (picc., alto), clarinet (bass), violin, cello, piano, percussion, and harp.(28:00) Written and premiered by The Theater Chamber Players, John F. Kennedy Center for the Performing Arts.

== Discography ==
- Voices of Our Time, A recital of Dawn Upshaw recorded at The Théâtre du Châtelet, Paris. On Naxos/TDK DVD
- Chamber Concerto for piano and chamber orchestra, On Grand Designs from Capstone records
- 3 Works for Solo Instruments and Orchestra, featuring Matt Haimovitz and Christina Jennings from Albany records.
- Quartets, featuring the JACK Quartet, Jamie Van Eyck and Christopher Taylor in String Quartet #1, Creature Quartet, Sudden Light for voice, 2 violins and cello and Song for Andrew, a piano quartet, on Albany records.
- Notable Women: Trios by Today’s Female Composers, featuring the Lincoln Trio in works by Laura Schwendinger, Lera Auerbach, Stacy Garrop, and Augusta Read Thomas
- Cow Music, Kofomi#13 - Stimmen.Atmen from Ein Klang records, Austria
