= Gerald Tsai =

American money manager

Gerald Tsai Jr.
- 蔡至勇
- Born: Cài Zhìyǒng; March 10, 1929; Shanghai, China
- Died: July 9, 2008 (aged 79); New York City, New York, U.S.
- Education: Wesleyan University; Boston University (BA, MA)
- Occupation: Investment management
- Employers: Primerica; Fidelity Investments
- Known for: Founder of Manhattan Fund
- Spouses: Loretta Young; Marlyn Chase; Cynthia Ann Ekberg; Nancy Raeburn aka Nancy Tsai
- Children: Christopher Tsai; Veronica Tsai; Gerald Van Tsai

Gerald Tsai Jr. (Chinese: 蔡至勇; pinyin: Cài Zhìyǒng; March 10, 1929 – July 9, 2008) was an investor and philanthropist who helped build Fidelity Investments into a mutual fund powerhouse.

After starting Fidelity Investments' first publicly sold aggressive growth fund in 1958, the Fidelity Capital Fund, he later founded the Manhattan Fund, an aggressive growth fund, in 1965. Tsai sold his interest in the fund complex in 1968 but continued to manage the funds. By 1969 the funds collapsed, losing 90% of their value. An early proponent of momentum investing, Tsai's specialty was concentrating his portfolios on narrow batches of glamour stocks, including Xerox and Polaroid Corporation, at a time when broad diversification was the prevailing wisdom.

Tsai later became CEO of a can company, American Can Company. He was the first Chinese-American CEO of a Dow Jones Industrials company.

== Early life ==
Tsai was born to Gerald Tsai Sr. and Ruth Tsai in Shanghai, where he lived as a child. His mother was a stockbroker.

His father attended the University of Michigan and was the Shanghai district manager for the Ford Motor Company.

== Education ==
Tsai attended St. John's University, Shanghai before moving to the United States in 1947. He attended Wesleyan University for one semester, and graduated from Boston University with a Bachelor's and Master's in Economics.

== Early career ==
In 1951, Tsai began as a security analyst at Bache and Company. In 1952, he joined Boston's Fidelity Management and Research, and was named vice president in 1960. In 1958, he became fund manager of the newly formed Fidelity Capital mutual fund.

By 1965, Tsai had sold his Fidelity stock and started the Manhattan Fund which won him widespread attention. When the fund first offered shares, a modest offering of 2.5 million shares quickly ballooned to a total of 27 million, bringing the fund $247 million in capital and representing what was at the time the biggest offering of an investment company.

In 1968, he sold the fund for $27 million in stock to the CNA Financial Corporation, just as the fund's superior results were declining and as the bull market was starting to wane. He remained with Tsai Management, the company he had founded to manage the Manhattan Fund, after the sale. In 1973 Tsai resigned from CNA. He sold his CNA stock and bought a brokerage house, renaming it G. Tsai & Co.

In 1978, Tsai acquired an insurance company, Associated Madison, for $2.2 million and sold it four years later to American Can Company for $162 million. The sale was recommended by William Stewart Woodside, the then chairman and chief executive of American Can Co., for Tsai to join the corporate team of American Can Co. According to Woodside, he gave Tsai $500 million to invest.

== Primerica ==
In 1982, Tsai became vice-chairman of American Can Company – a former component of the Dow Jones Industrial Average. Tsai later gained control of the company. American Can was a container production and food packaging business, and Tsai orchestrated its shift toward the more lucrative financial services sector.

In 1987, Tsai purchased the financial firm Smith Barney for $475 million. By this time, the combined company had changed its name to Primerica to reflect its financial focus and Tsai was chairman and chief executive officer, making him the first Chinese-American to lead a Dow Jones Industrials company.

A year later, Primerica and Commercial Credit Group, headed by Sanford I. Weill were combined in a $1.65 billion deal. With 1.5 million shares, Tsai remained the largest shareholder and was named a director, while Weill ran the company. Tsai received a golden parachute worth an estimated $40 million.

== Other business interests ==
Later in his life, Tsai re-entered the insurance industry, becoming chief executive officer of the Delta Life Corporation. In 1997, Tsai sold Delta Life to AmerUs Life Holdings for $185 million. Tsai was on the board of directors of numerous companies, including Apollo Investment Corporation, Rite Aid, Saks, United Rentals and Zenith Insurance Company.

== Philanthropy ==
Tsai was actively involved in philanthropy through the Gerald Tsai Foundation. He was a trustee of Boston University from 1967 to 1977 and from 1988 to 2002. He was an honorary member of the board until his death. The Tsai family donated $7.5 million to the university to establish the Tsai Performance Center and Tsai Fitness Center.

Tsai served on the board of trustees of the School of Medicine Foundation Board and the NYU Langone Medical Center, where he established the Gerald Tsai Transplantation Unit. Tsai also served on the board of trustees of the Norton Museum of Art and was a member of the board of overseers of the Wharton School of the University of Pennsylvania.

== Personal life ==
Tsai was married four times and had three children, including Christopher Tsai, founder of Tsai Capital.

In 1969, he divorced his first wife, Loretta Young and almost immediately remarried. His first two marriages each lasted 17 years.

In 1987, Tsai married Cynthia Ann Ekberg, the then vice president of Kidder Peabody & Company in San Diego. Ekberg is the daughter of Kathleen Culver of Western Springs, Ill., and Gerald Von Ekberg of Coronado. Her father is the president of the Barron Capital Corporation, financial consultants in San Diego. He divorced his third wife, Nancy Raeburn, in 2006.

In 2006, Tsai was engaged to Sharon Bush, the former wife of businessman Neil Bush (President George W. Bush's brother). The marriage was called off in 2008 after a high-profile breakup that resulted in a legal battle over an 11-carat-canary-diamond ring. The New York Times and CBS News reported that the investor sued Ms. Bush in Manhattan Supreme Court after she refused to return the ring.

== Death ==
Tsai died of multiple organ failure in Manhattan, New York City on July 9, 2008 at the age of 79, according to his son, Christopher Tsai.

== See also ==
- Fidelity Investments
- Value Investing
- Peter Lynch
- Fidelity Investments
