= American Can Company =

American manufacturing company (1901–1987)

- Final logo, used from 1966
- Type: Private
- Traded as: NYSE: CAN (until 1987); S&P 500 component (until 1987); DJIA component (until 1987)
- Industry: Can manufacturing
- Founded: 1901
- Defunct: 1987
- Fate: Reorganized as Primerica
- Successor: Primerica
- Headquarters: Greenwich, Connecticut, U.S.
- Products: tin cans, metal packaging

The American Can Company was a manufacturer of tin cans. It was a member of the Tin Can Trust, that controlled a "large percentage of business in the United States in tin cans, containers, and packages of tin." American Can Company ranked 97th among United States corporations in the value of World War II military production contracts. It was a member of the Dow Jones Industrial Average from 1959 to 1991. After 1987 it was known as Primerica, a financial conglomerate which divested itself of its packaging arm in 1986 in a sale to French firm Pechiney.

Primerica merged with Commercial Credit Company in 1988, and later evolved into Citigroup.

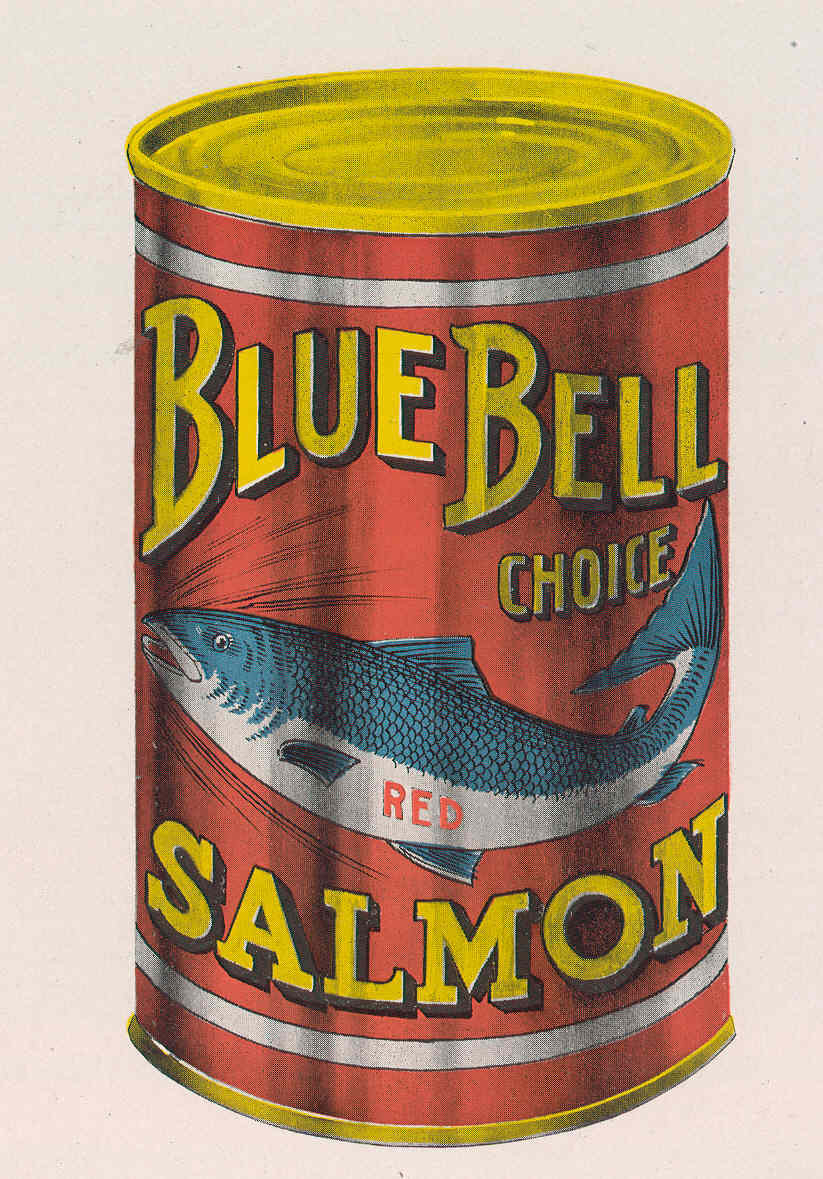
Example of lithographed can, 1918

The American Can Company had its headquarters at the Pershing Square Building in Manhattan, New York City, until 1970, when it moved into a Greenwich, Connecticut, facility, which had been developed on 150 acres (61 ha) of wooded land in the late 1960s. In the early 1980s American Can renamed itself and ended its operations in Greenwich.

== History ==
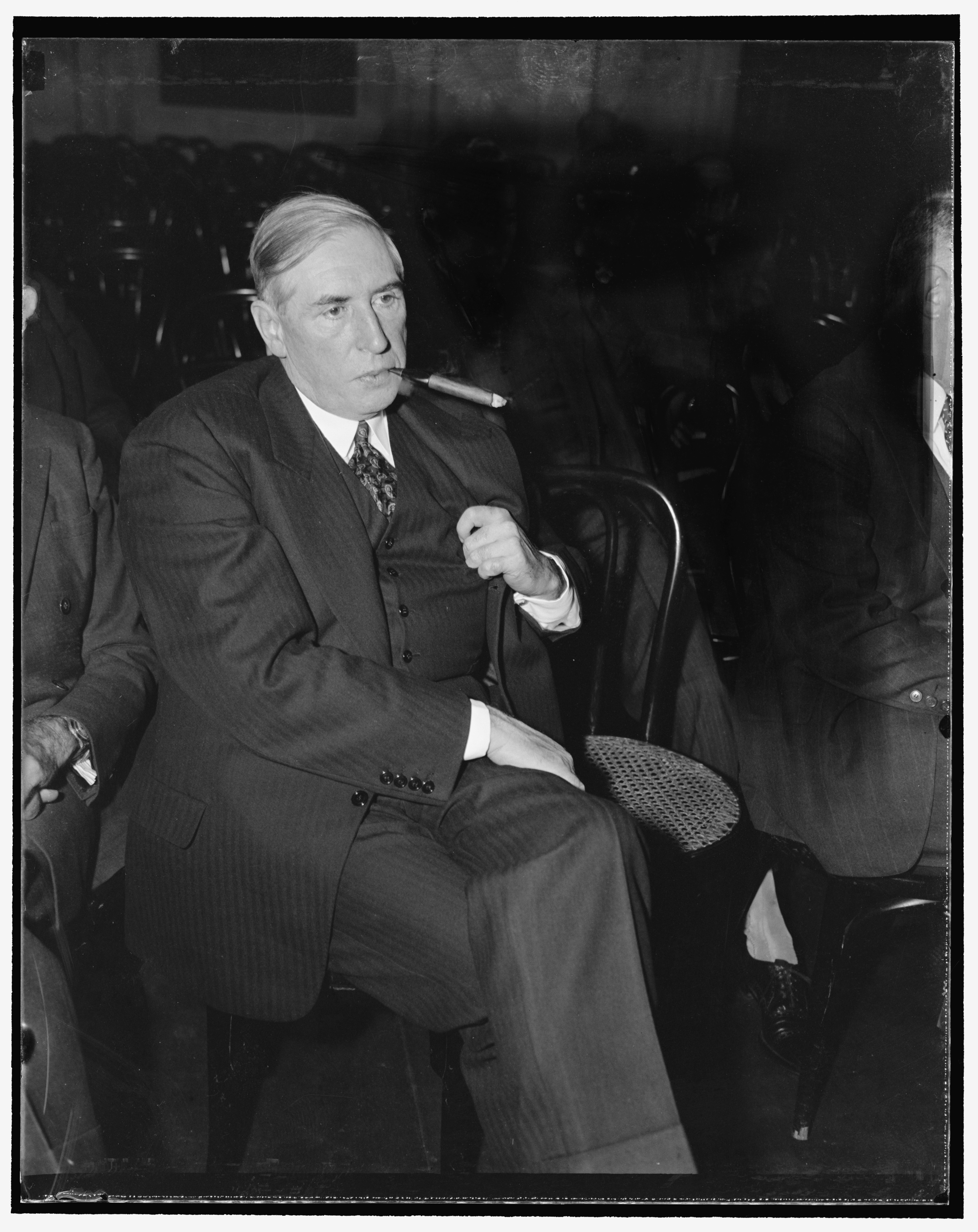
President of American Can Co., Herbert A. Baker, listening to a session of the National Monopoly Committee in 1939

The American Can Company was incorporated in 1901.

In 1904, the American Can Company of Greenwich, Connecticut bought the small Norton Can Company that had operated since 1887 at York and Bay Streets (Toronto, Ontario). It acquired the Charles W. Shonk Company in 1906. The company expanded further in 1908 when it bought the Sanitary Can Company of Niagara Falls and the Acme Can Works in Montreal. For many years, the American Can Company was Canada's largest producer of tin cans.

In 1957, Dixie cup merged with the American Can Company. In the early 1970s, American Can developed Fresh'n as a toilet paper competitor.

The James River Corporation of Virginia purchased American Can's paper business in 1982. The assets of James River are now part of Georgia-Pacific, a subsidiary of Koch Industries, the second largest privately owned company in the United States.

In 1985, Nelson Peltz's New York–based Triangle Industries bought the National Can Company for $460 million. The same year, it acquired the Dunham's Sports athletic store chain and made it part of its retail sector, which also included Musicland and Fingerhut.

In 1986, Triangle Industries acquired the packaging division of Gerald Tsai's American Can Company for $570 million.

In 1987 American Can announced that it would change its 86-year-old name to "Primerica".

In 1988, Pechiney S.A., the French metal conglomerate, acquired Triangle Industries. At the time of the buyout, American National Can was the largest can company in the United States. Rexam acquired American National Can's metal can business in 2000.

American Can was formed during Phoenix Can's mergers and acquisition program that consolidated competitors. The newly created entity was renamed American Can.

== Facilities ==
- Arlington, Texas
- Baltimore, Maryland
- Brisbane, California
- Carson, California
- Chatham, Ontario
- Chicago, Illinois
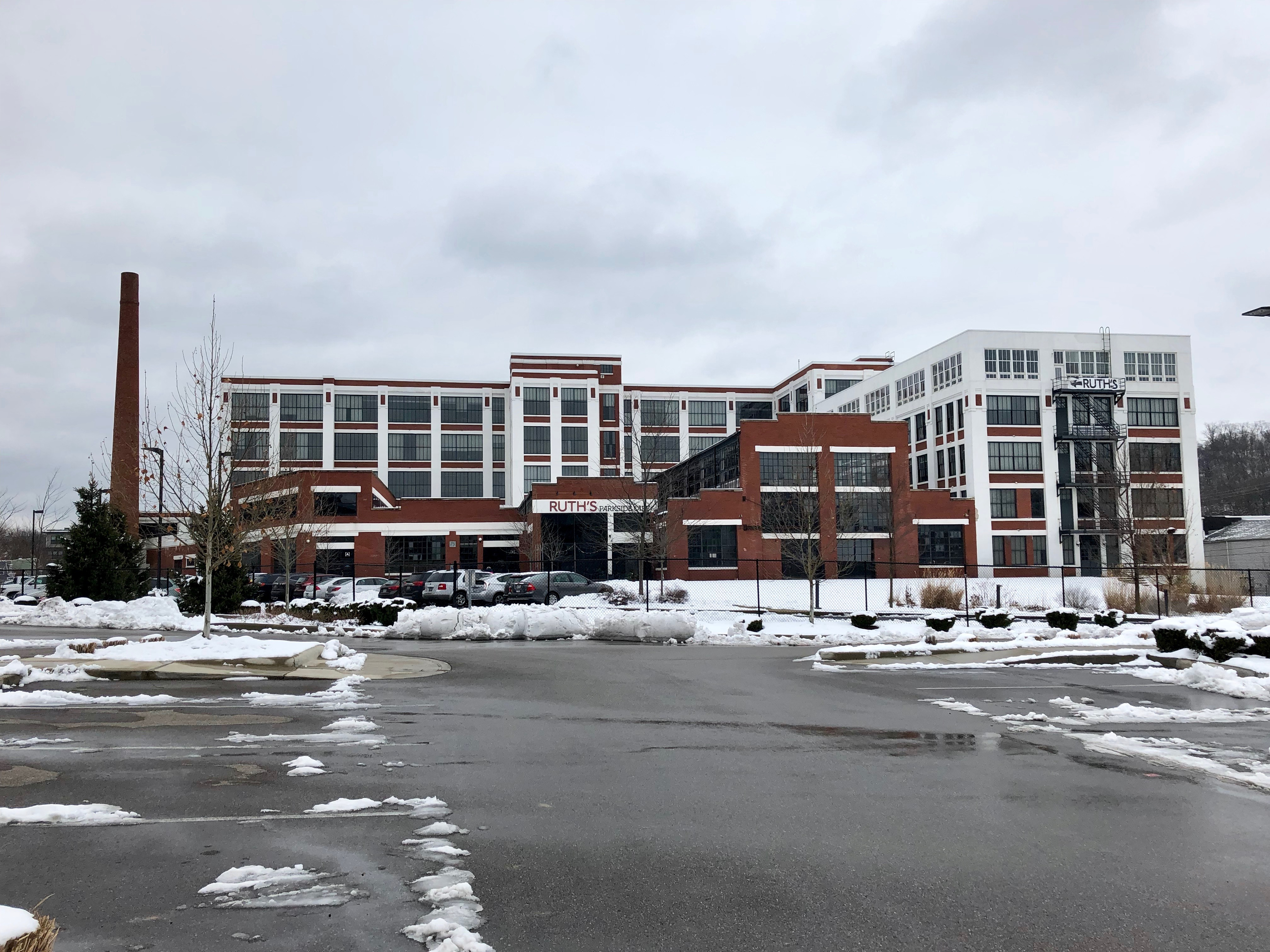
- Former building in Cincinnati
  Cincinnati, Ohio
- Dade City, Florida
- Dayton, New Jersey
- Edison, New Jersey
- Fair Lawn, New Jersey
- Fairport, New York
- Geneva, New York
- Glendale, California
- Greensboro, North Carolina
- Hamilton, Ontario
- Hammond, Indiana
- Hillside, New Jersey
- Honolulu, Hawaii
- Hoopeston, Illinois
- Jersey City, New Jersey
- Lemoyne, Pennsylvania
- Lubec, Maine
- Maywood, Illinois
- Milwaukee, Wisconsin
- Montreal, Quebec
- Needham Heights, Massachusetts
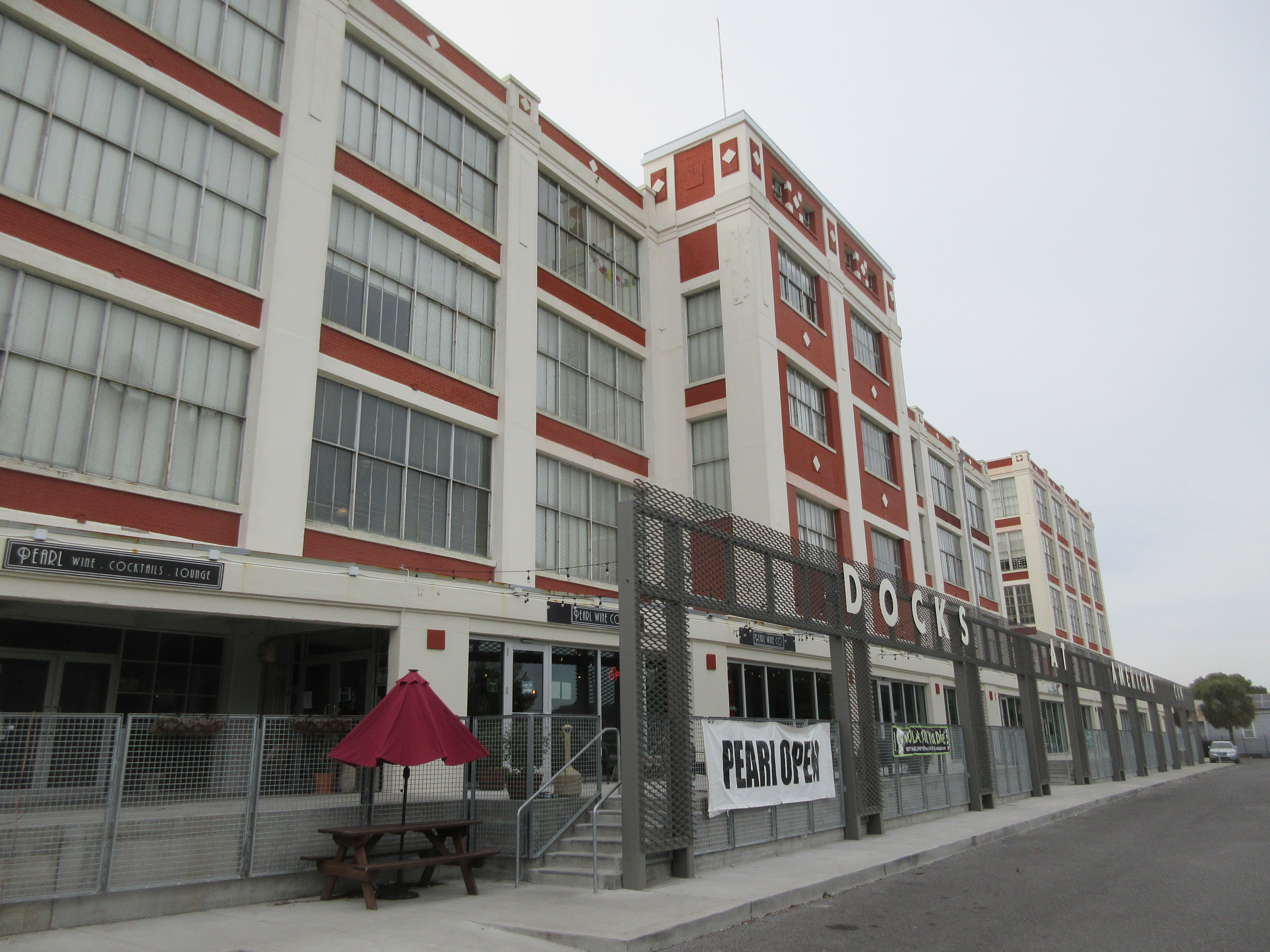
- Former building in New Orleans
  New Orleans, Louisiana
- New York, New York
- Ogden, Utah
- Pevely, Missouri
- Philadelphia, Pennsylvania
- Portland, Maine
- American Can Company Complex, Portland, Oregon
- Richmond, Virginia
- Sacramento, California
- Sacramento, California
- Saint Louis, Missouri
- Saint Paul, Minnesota
- San Antonio, Texas
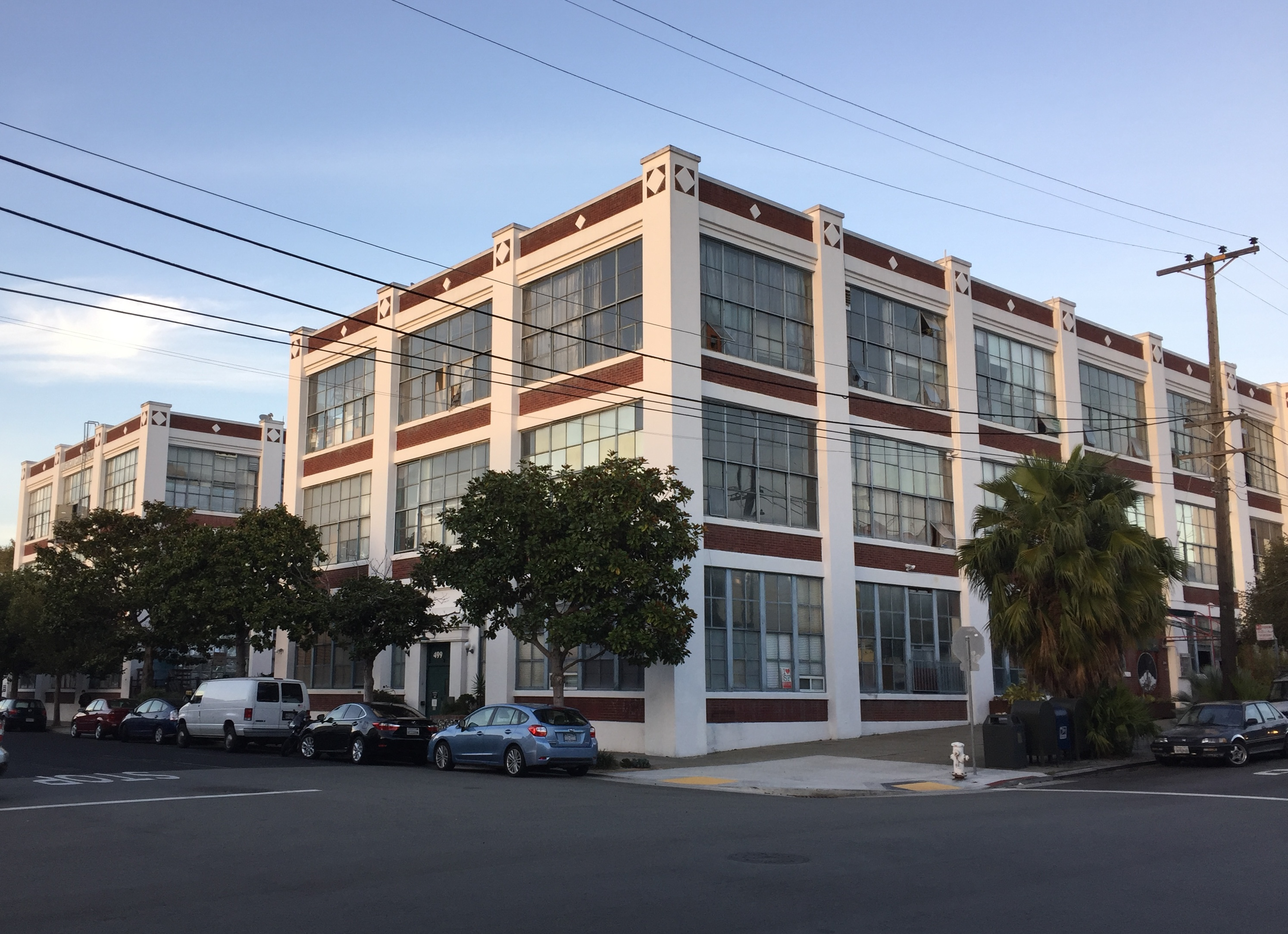
- Former building in San Francisco
  San Francisco, California
- San Jose, California
- Seattle, Washington
- Shelbyville, Tennessee
- Simcoe, Ontario
- Tampa, Florida
- Vancouver, British Columbia
- Washington, New Jersey

== See also ==
- Primerica
