= Joyce Mekeel =

American classical composer

Joyce Haviland Mekeel (July 6, 1931 in New Haven, CT – December 29, 1997, in Watertown, MA) was a composer, harpsichordist, teacher, anthropologist, and sculptor.

== Education ==
Joyce Mekeel studied at the Longy School of Music (1952–55), Paris Conservatory (1955–57) and Yale University (BM 1959, MM 1960). In Paris her teachers included Nadia Boulanger; in the 1960s she studied with Earl Kim. At Yale she studied harpsichord with Gustav Leonhardt and theory with David Kraehenbuehl. Mekeel received a fellowship to MacDowell Colony and grants in composition from Ingram-Merrill in 1964 and Radcliffe Institute from 1969-1970. She was a member of Sigma Alpha Iota. Mekeel took up studying anthropology which brought her to West Africa twice, where she created many sculptures. Mekeel also attended Princeton University. She held two doctoral degrees, one in anthropology.

== Career ==
=== Teaching ===
Mekeel taught at the New England Conservatory (1964–70) and Boston University (from 1970). In 1983, she was a research affiliate at the MIT Center for Advanced Visual Studies. At Boston University, she directed the electronic music studio and taught private composition lessons, as well as classes in Advanced Counterpoint, Cannon and Fugue, (for graduate students), Pedagogy of Theory, Ear Training and Music Theory. Articles include (1959) "The Harmonic Theories of Kirnberger and Marpurg", Journal of Music Theory Volumes. 3-4, Yale, p. 169-193. Several of her pupils went on to become professors of music themselves. It has been noted that Mekeel was especially tough on her female students, holding them to a higher standard in their work. Ultimately this would be necessary for them to get recognized within the music world.

=== Compositions ===
Many of her works are for theater or dance, and many of her works treat the voice or traditional instruments unusually. "Mekeel’s compositions include solo instrumental works, chamber music, orchestral and vocal music, and dramatic pieces for dancers, actors, and actresses with instrumentalists. Her compositions were especially championed by Richard Pittman and the Boston Musica Viva. Mekeel wrote music for Fenwick Smith and the Empire Brass Quintet.

"Mekeel's approach to music is eclectic and reflects her diverse interests. Often drama is used as a catalyst. For example, Corridors of Dreams (1972), Serena (1975), and Alarums and Excursions (1978) use multilingual texts. Some of her compositions employ as many as eight languages, and the execution of the text is an integral part of the composition. In Mekeel's instrumental works, her combination of instruments and voice is unique, and the sound of words is an important part of her timbral resources. She avoids reliance on institutional musical organizations like the orchestra, preferring to choose instruments and groupings of musicians which allow her to innovate."

Mekeel's compositions were known for their elegant style. They were finely tuned, with clear contrapuntal textures. The works are not overtly emotional, but beautiful thought provoking and captivating.

==== Toward The Source ====
Joyce Mekeel’s “Toward the Source” for orchestra and chorus was commissioned by the Concord Bicentennial Committee and was premiered by the Concord Orchestra and the Concord-Carlisle High School Concert Choir for the April Patriots’ Day celebration in 1975. Joyce Mekeel did extensive research to complete her assignment to interpret “Concord, its rivers, and its search for values.“ The piece relates the town’s history from 1635 to the time of the transcendentalists. The chorus recites Indian place names, sites on the river, Biblical quotes, tombstone inscriptions and the name of every colonial fighter at the North Bridge the day of “the shot heard ’round the world.” It concludes with a quote from the hymn that Ives used as the basis of the “Concord Sonata,” a work inspired by the transcendentalists.

==== Serena ====
Joyce Mekeel's "Serena" was commissioned by the Berkshire Music Center and the Fromm Music Foundation of Harvard and was premiered by performers - Beverly Morgan (mezzo‐soprano), Linda Livingood (speaker), and William Goldenberg (pianist), at the Tanglewood Music Festival in 1975. "She chose a difficult mixture of idioms, but was in full command of the problem." While the mezzo-soprano sings a multi-lingual text put together from various writings of Ungaretti, Petronius Arbiter, Basho, the composer herself among many others; the speaker pronounces a prose poem by Thomas Mann about the coming of night, sweet death and peace. "A piano cunningly fitted out Cage style", with cymbals and other tone‐altering impedimenta on the strings, accompanies this dialogue with a simple yet exotic sound and "an occasional outburst of clattering hysteria."

== Personal life, death, and legacy ==
=== Marriage ===
Mekeel was married to Frank Hubbard who was a harpsichord builder in Boston (May 15, 1920 – February 25, 1976).

=== Death and legacy ===
Little is known about Mekeel's death, but it is said that she died due to complications from stroke at the age of 66. Mekeel had stated that she did not want any sort of service or gathering memorializing her. Prior to her death, an archivist from Harvard University visited Mekeel at her home and saw several sculptures, which they are now not able to find. In 2019, Harvard Library presented an exhibition of her sculptural works entitled "Toward the Source". Her works were on view at the Richard F. French Gallery in the Loeb Music Library. It is said that Mekeel did not get as much attention and admiration as her male colleagues. To this day her works are still not performed nearly as much as her male counterpart's.

== Discography ==
=== Stage ===
- Androcles and the Lion (G.B. Shaw), 1961
- Jaywalk, va, dancer, 1969
- Moveable Feast nos.1–3, vv, insts, 1973–4, collab. P. Earls and L. Davidson

=== Instrumental ===
- Gifts of the Ebb Tide, pf, 1965
- Str Figures Disentangled by a Flute, fl, str orch, 1968
- Shapes of Silence, fl, 1969
- Spindrift, str qt, 1970
- Embouchure II, 3 tpt, 3 trbn, 1972
- Hommages, 2 tpt, hn, trbn, tuba, 1973
- Planh, vn, 1974
- Rune, fl, perc, 1976
- Vigil, orch, 1977, rev. 1986
- Scroll of Hungry Dreams, tuba, 1980
- Fertile Vicissitudes, ob, hp, 1981
- essera, hpd, ens, 1981
- Insomnia of Owls, ww qnt, 1984, rev. 1985
- Voices, vn, cl, pf, 1985
- Obscurities of Order, eng hn, orch, c1990
- Pantoum, vn, pf, c1991

=== Vocal ===
- Phrases (G. Stein), S, pf, 1960
- Dark Rime (R.M. Rilke), S, pf, 1965
- White Silence (Jap. haiku, trans. Mekeel), SATB, 1965
- Waterwalk (Mekeel), speaking SATB, 1970
- Corridors of Dream (W. Kandinsky, M.P. Hein, W.D. Schurre, A. Stramm, H.M. Enzensberger), Mez, a fl, cl, va, vc, hp, perc, 1972
- Serena (P. Arbiter, G. Ungaretti, Bashō, T. Mann), spkr, Mez, prep pf, 1975
- Toward the Source (Pss, prayers, hymns), SATB, orch, 1975
- Alarums and Excursions (Sanskrit, Stramm, e.e. cummings, Ungaretti, E. Dickinson, Aeschylus, G. Seferis, Jap. haiku), Mez + actor, fl, cl, vn, va, vc, perc, 1978
- Journeys of Remembrance (M. Twain, C. Jung, J.L. Borges, S. Freud, J. Gardner, others), S, Mez + actor, Bar, fl, cl, eng hn, vn, va, vc, perc, c1986

=== Electro-acoustic ===
Embouchure I, tape, 1969, collab. L. Davidson; Kisses and Kazoos (Valentine’s Day cards, etc.), 3 spkrs, live tape, 1977, collab. Davidson and P. Earls; Sigil (Stein, D. Boehm, Ungaretti, T. Roethke, A. Camus, Mann, Borges), 2 actors, 2 eng hn, cl, dbn, 2 hn, tuba, str qt, elecs, 1980–81, rev. 1997

== Awards ==
=== Fellowships ===
- MacDowell Colony (1963, 1964, 1974)
- Yaddo (1974)
- Ingram-Merrill grant (1964)

=== Notable commissions ===
- Boston Musica Viva
- Fromm Music Foundation
- Louisville Orchestra
