= Freshwater (opera) =

Chamber opera premiered by Andy Vores

Freshwater is a two-act chamber opera composed by Andy Vores, based on the 1935 comic play by Virginia Woolf. Vores received assistance in creating the opera from Quentin Bell, Woolf's nephew and executor, who provided a rarely seen earlier version of the text that served as the inspiration for several passages of the libretto.

Freshwater was commissioned by the Boston University Opera Institute and had its world premiere on December 2, 1994 at the Huntington Theatre in Boston.
