= BlueLine Rental =

American equipment rental company

- Founded: July 2, 2001
- Headquarters: The Woodlands, Texas, USA
- Key people: Asterios Satrazemis (CEO)
- Products: Construction & Industrial Equipment Rentals and Sales
- Website: www.bluelinerental.com

BlueLine Rental, formerly Volvo Rents, was an American company that rented construction equipment to contractors and retail consumers through a network of company owned stores. The company specialized in renting a variety of construction equipment, ranging from small tools and light towers to large earthmoving equipment. It also offered services such as equipment maintenance and repair, on-site technical assistance, and equipment delivery.

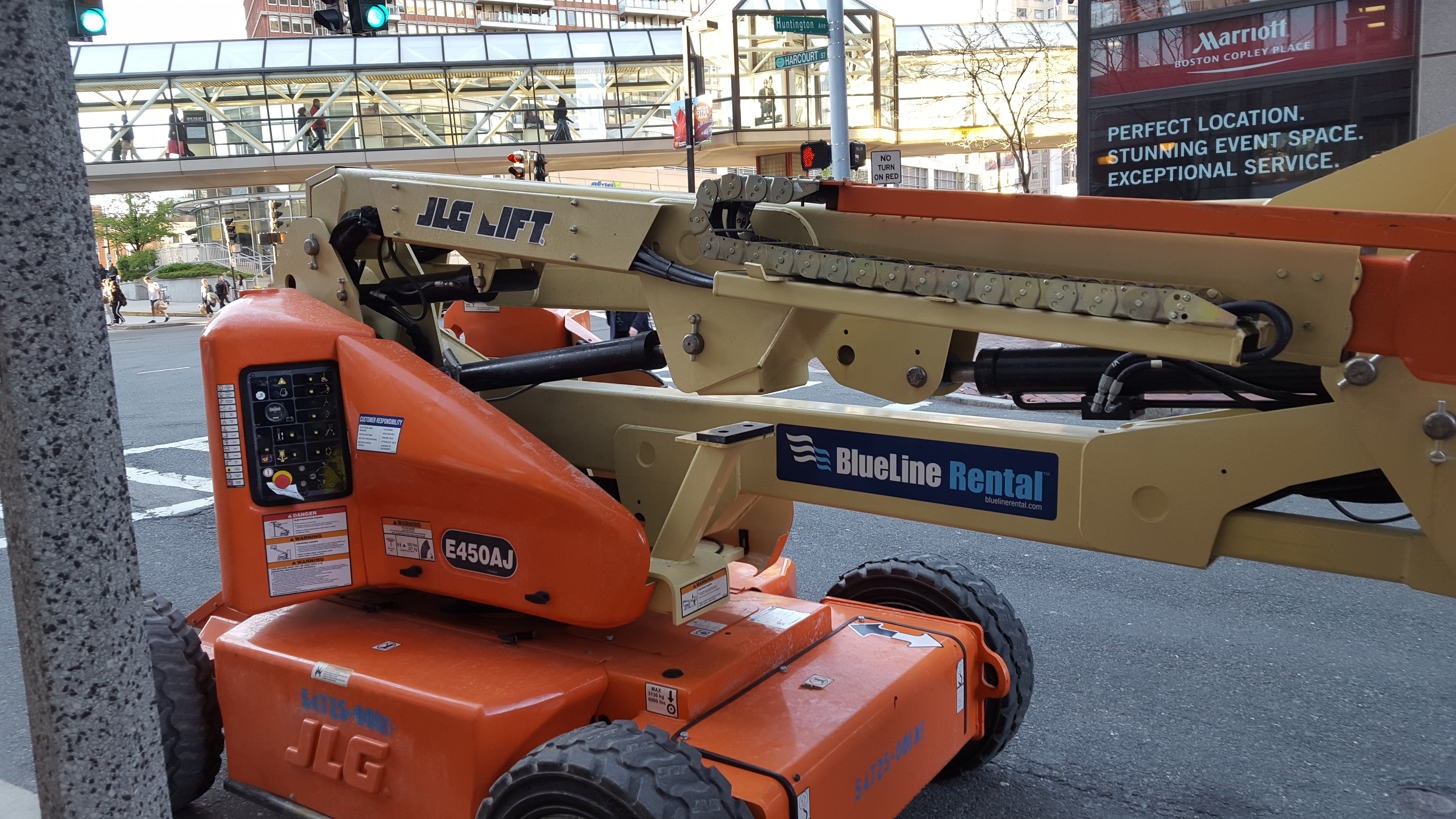
A JLG brand articulating boom lift rented from BlueLine Rental.

== History ==
BlueLine Rental was founded as Volvo Rents on July 2, 2001.

Volvo Rents was a wholly owned subsidiary of the Volvo Group, which is a publicly held company headquartered in Gothenburg, Sweden. Volvo Rents had more 185 locations in North America. As of May 2011, the company was number 17 on the annual RER 100.

In February 2014, Volvo Rents was sold to Platinum Equity and changed its name to BlueLine Rental.

In January 2016, Asterios Satrazemis was appointed as CEO of BlueLine Rental.

On September 11, 2018, United Rentals announced an agreement to purchase BlueLine Rental from Platinum Equity for about $2.1 billion in cash. The deal closed in the fourth quarter of 2018.
