= Peter Child =

Peter Burlingham Child (born 6 May 1953) is a British composer, teacher, and musical analyst. He is Professor of Music at the Massachusetts Institute of Technology (MIT) and was a composer in residence with the New England Philharmonic.

== Education and career ==
Child took his first composition lessons at the age of 12 with Bernard Barrell. He began attending Keele University in Staffordshire, England, but transferred to Reed College in Portland, Oregon in 1973 in a junior-year exchange program. He earned his BA in music at Reed in 1975. Child then studied Kamatic music in Madras, India for one year on a Thomas J. Watson Fellowship. In 1978 he won a fellowship to the Berkshire Music Center in Lenox, Massachusetts, where he studied under Jacob Druckman. In 1981 he received his PhD in musical composition from Brandeis University, where his teachers included Arthur Berger, Martin Boykan, and Seymour Shifrin.

Child taught at Brandeis and chaired MIT's department of Music and Theater Arts from 1996 to 1999.

He was the American Symphony Orchestra League – Meet the Composer "Music Alive" composer in residence with the Albany Symphony Orchestra from 2005 to 2008. Child wrote five new compositions for that orchestra, including Washington Park, a work inspired by the city's Washington Park Historic District.

== Composer ==
Child composes music for orchestra, chorus, computer synthesis, voice, and chamber groups. His compositional style has been compared to Charles Ives, Benjamin Britten, and Gustav Mahler. Among his works are Embers (1984), a one-act chamber opera based on the play by Samuel Beckett, and Clare Cycle (1984), four settings from the poetry of John Clare.

Among the musical ensembles that have performed his music are the John Oliver Chorale, the Pro Arte Orchestra, the Lydian String Quartet, Collage, Parnassus, New York New Music, New Millennium Ensemble, the Pittsburgh New Music Ensemble, Lontano (Great Britain), Interensemble (Italy), Speak Percussion (Australia), Emory University Wind Ensemble and Percussion Ensemble, and Boston Musica Viva.

Child's music has been commissioned by the Harvard Musical Association, the Fromm Foundation at Harvard University, and the Massachusetts Council on the Arts and Humanities. Massachusetts resident Peter Grinnell Gombosi commissioned him to write several compositions for significant events in the Gombosi family's life, including a string quartet commissioned in honor of the birth of Gombosi's son Andrew.

== Awards ==
Child is the recipient of many music awards, including the 1994 Gyorgy Kepes Fellowship Prize awarded by the MIT Council for the Arts, the 2001 Music of Changes Award, and the 2004 Levitan Award in the Humanities from MIT. His compositions have earned the 1978 Margaret Grant Memorial Prize from Tanglewood, the 1979 First Prize from East and West Artists, the 1980 Recording Prize from WGBH Radio, the 1983 New Works Prize from the New England Conservatory, and the 1983 New England Composers Prize from the League-International Society for Contemporary Music, Boston.

== Personal ==
Child has lived in Cambridge 40 + years. The last 15 with his 2nd wife, the conceptual artist Lina Viste Grønli with whom he collaborated on the composition "Practicing Haydn" (along with Elaine Chew). He has recently relocated to Norway with his wife Lina and their daughter Elsie Ruth. From a previous marriage to Sheila Perry Brachfeld-Child, he has two daughters, Madeleine and Rachel.

== Works ==
=== Musical analysis ===
- The Theory and Analysis of Musical Phrase Structure. University Microfilms International. 1985.

=== Musical compositions ===
- Duo for flute and percussion: Study score. Mobart Music. 1981.
- Ensemblance (1982): per flauto, clarinetto in sib (i.e., si♭), violino, viola, violoncello, percussioni, pianoforte e nastro magnetico. Semar. 1988.
