= Menzie Chinn =

American economist

Menzie David Chinn
- Born: 1961 (age 64–65); Washington
- Spouse: Laura Schwendinger

Academic background
- Education: Harvard College; University of California at Berkeley

Academic work
- Discipline: Economics
- Institutions: University of Wisconsin–Madison
- Website: https://www.ssc.wisc.edu/~mchinn/; Information at IDEAS / RePEc

Menzie David Chinn (born 1961) is a professor of public affairs and economics at the University of Wisconsin–Madison, co-editor of the Journal of International Money and Finance, and a research associate of the National Bureau of Economic Research International Finance and Macroeconomics Program.

== Education and career ==
Chinn received a BA from Harvard College in 1984, a PhD in economics from the University of California at Berkeley in 1991, and was a senior economist with the White House Council of Economic Advisers from 2000 to 2001. He contributes to an economics blog at econbrowser.com which has been highly ranked by traffic amongst economics blogs, and is frequently interviewed by economics journalists.

== Works ==
By citation, Chinn is ranked among the top 500 authors of economic journals and ranked 521 in terms of downloads on the Social Science Research Network. He has written extensively on international economics, trade and exchange rates.

He describes his teaching material as "the (old) neoclassical synthesis, i.e., Keynesian short run plus Classical long run — and some New Keynesian"

- Lost Decades (with Jeffrey Frieden), W. W. Norton & Company, 2011
- International Economics (with Douglas Irwin), Cambridge University Press, 2025

=== Most Cited Works ===
- Chinn, Menzie D., and Hiro Ito. "What matters for financial development? Capital controls, institutions, and interactions." Journal of development economics 81, no. 1 (2006): 163–192.
- Chinn, Menzie D., and Hiro Ito. "A new measure of financial openness." Journal of comparative policy analysis 10, no. 3 (2008): 309–322.
- Chinn, Menzie D., and Eswar S. Prasad. "Medium-term determinants of current accounts in industrial and developing countries: an empirical exploration." Journal of International Economics 59, no. 1 (2003): 47–76.* Cheung, Yin-Wong, Menzie D. Chinn, and Antonio Garcia Pascual. "Empirical exchange rate models of the nineties: Are any fit to survive?." Journal of international money and finance 24, no. 7 (2005): 1150–1175.
- Chinn, Menzie D., and Robert W. Fairlie. "The determinants of the global digital divide: a cross-country analysis of computer and internet penetration." Oxford Economic Papers 59, no. 1 (2007): 16–44.
- Chinn, Menzie, and Jeffrey A. Frankel. "Will the euro eventually surpass the dollar as leading international reserve currency?." In G7 Current account imbalances: sustainability and adjustment, pp. 283–338. University of Chicago Press, 2007.
