= New England Philharmonic =

- Orchestra
- Short name: NEP
- Former name: Mystic Valley Chamber Orchestra
- Founded: 1976; 50 years ago
- Location: Boston MA, United States of America
- Concert hall: Tsai Performance Center, Boston University
- Concertmaster: Danielle Maddon
- Music director: Tianhui Ng
- Website: nephilharmonic.org

The New England Philharmonic is a volunteer orchestra based in Boston, Massachusetts, founded in 1976. The current music director is Tianhui Ng.

== History ==
The New England Philharmonic, a volunteer orchestra, was founded in 1976, by Michel Perrault, then residing in Winchester, MA and Gervásio de Chaves, a resident of Arlington, MA, as the Mystic Valley Chamber Orchestra. The first public performances were held in November 1977 in Arlington, Massachusetts and Belmont, Massachusetts.

In 1986, the orchestra took up residence at Framingham State College under music director, Jeffrey Rink and in 1987 adopted its current name. The orchestra's musical director at this time was Ronald Feldman, then a cellist with the Boston Symphony Orchestra. The orchestra was the orchestra in residence at Simmons College from 1996 through 2014. Richard Pittman served as music director from 1997 to 2022.

== Repertoire and awards ==
The orchestra is known for its premieres of new works by contemporary composers, and its performances of both earlier works of classical music, as well as more modern music. The orchestra organizes an annual call for scores from emerging composers, and also a young artist competition. The orchestra has received the Award for Adventurous Programming from the American Society of Composers, Authors and Publishers seven times, most recently in 2011.

The ensemble hosts a composer in residence each season. Past composers in residence include Marjorie Merryman, Peter Child, Michael Gandolfi, Andy Vores, Richard Cornell, and Robert Kyr, the last of whom was the first such composer, appointed in 1985.

The orchestra has received grants and awards from organizations supporting the arts, including the Aaron Copland Fund for Music and the Virgil Thomson Foundation. The orchestra is supported by the Massachusetts Cultural Council, a state agency of Massachusetts.

== Performances ==
The orchestra presents an annual series of concerts beginning each fall, appearing at the Tsai Performance Center at Boston University. The orchestra is currently entering its 37th season.

During its 35th anniversary season in 2011–2012, the orchestra gave two well-received performances of the War Requiem by Benjamin Britten, together with Chorus pro Musica, the Providence Singers and the Boston Children’s Chorus. One performance, in Boston, was held at the Cathedral of the Holy Cross. A second performance, in Providence, Rhode Island, was held at the Cathedral of Saints Peter and Paul.
