= Tsai Capital =

American investment management and advisory firm

Tsai Capital Corporation
- Company type: Private
- Industry: Investment Management
- Founded: New York City, USA (November 1997)
- Key people: Christopher Tsai (Founder)
- AUM: US$148 Million (March 2026)
- Website: www.tsaicapital.com

Tsai Capital Corporation is a Manhattan-based investment management and advisory firm. The company was founded in 1997 by Christopher Tsai.

== History ==
Tsai Capital was founded in 1997 by Christopher Tsai, who is the President and Chief Investment Officer of the firm. Tsai Capital manages money primarily for high net-worth individuals, family offices, corporations and charitable foundations. The firm invests in growth companies.

In 2010, Tsai Capital created a 5-member advisory committee. Kristofer Segerberg, formerly of Soros Fund Management, was appointed to the committee. In 2011, Tsai Capital launched an equity fund. The fund launched with around $20 million in existing capital from current clients.

The firm invested in companies with exposure to Asia in 2014 and has also invested in American-based multinational corporations.

In December 2025, Tsai Capital appointed Nadim Abi Abdallah as Senior Research Analyst. In March 2026, the firm hired David Reichberg as Research and Operations Analyst. On April 29, 2026, Tsai Capital announced the Tsai Q-System, a proprietary analytical framework for evaluating business quality.

== Operation ==
Christopher Tsai has stated that the firm looks for asymmetric investment opportunities that it can hold for a long period of time. The firm believes in concentration as opposed to broad diversification and does not equate volatility with risk. The firm defines risk as the potential for permanent loss of capital. Tsai Capital invests on a global basis and seeks durability of growth rather than high growth in any one year. Tsai Capital prefers to invest in businesses that are asset-light and have durable competitive advantages.

== See also ==
- Christopher Tsai
- Gerald Tsai
- Fidelity Investments
- Fidelity Magellan Fund
- Value investing
