= Christopher Houlihan =

American concert organist (born 1987)

- Also known as: Houli
- Born: Christopher Mark Houlihan; October 6, 1987 (age 38)
- Origin: Somers, Connecticut, U.S.
- Genre: Classical music
- Occupation: Concert organist
- Instrument: Organ
- Label: Towerhill Recordings
- Website: christopherhoulihan.com

Christopher Mark Houlihan (born October 6, 1987) is an American concert organist noted for his clarity, flexibility of rhythm, and technical achievement. His Vierne 2012 tour in which he performed Louis Vierne's complete organ symphonies in six cities across North America was met with critical acclaim.

== Biography ==
Originally from Somers, Connecticut, Houlihan began studying the organ at age 12 with John Rose, and at age 15, he won the first prize in the Albert Schweitzer National Organ Competition. Houlihan attended Trinity College in Hartford where he continued to study with John Rose and made his orchestral debut with the Hartford Symphony. After graduating from Trinity College, he attended the Juilliard School in New York where he studied with the Grammy Award-winning organist Paul Jacobs.

In 2005–2006, Houlihan was organ scholar at the Cathedral of St. Joseph in Hartford and then at Christ Church Cathedral in Hartford from 2006 to 2007. Houlihan later studied at the French National Regional Conservatory in Versailles where he was a student of Jean-Baptiste Robin and where he earned the “Prix de Perfectionnement” (equivalent to a university artist's diploma in the US). While in France, he served as an assistant musician at the American Cathedral in Paris and had the honor of performing for the then President and First Lady of the United States, Mr. and Mrs. George W. Bush.

His first CD, Louis Vierne: Second Symphony for Organ was released by Towerhill Recordings in 2007, and featured music of Charles-Marie Widor and Louis Vierne. Houlihan was praised for his "elegant playing"and named "a major talent". His second CD, Joys, Mournings, and Battles: Music of Duruflé and Alain, recorded on the historic Aeolian-Skinner organ in All Saints Church, Worcester, Massachusetts, was released in January 2010. Houlihan was praised for his “passion and great technical facility” by audiophile.

In 2012 Houlihan launched his “Vierne 2012” tour commemorating the 75th anniversary of the French composer's death. Houlihan played the complete organ symphonies of Louis Vierne in six North American cities (New York, Denver, Chicago, Los Angeles, Montreal, and Dallas). His tour launch concert in New York City at the Church of the Ascension is “considered as one of New York’s all-time great organ recitals.” Mark Swed of the Los Angeles Times described the tour as a "major revelation" and credited it with “launching a major career.”

Houlihan has been a featured performer at four conventions of the American Guild of Organists. He has performed professionally in 29 states as well as in Canada, France and Scotland.

== Approach and style ==
Critics have described Houlihan’s playing as flexible and clear, and have commented on his technical ability and sense of rhythm. Houlihan has stated that he aims to bring the organ and organ music greater prominence within classical music.

== Recordings ==
- 2007: Louis Vierne: Second Symphony for Organ
- 2010: Joys, Mournings, and Battles: Music of Duruflé and Alain
- 2017: Christopher Houlihan Plays Bach
- 2023: Franck & Vierne: First and Last

== Awards ==
Award	Presenting organization
Prix de Perfectionnement	French National Regional Conservatory
Irene Diamond Graduate Fellowship; John Dexter Bush Scholarship; Arlin J. Smith Scholarship; The Chairman's Grant	Juilliard School
First Prize	Albert Schweitzer National Organ Competition
Charlotte Hoyt Bagnall Scholarship	Charlotte Hoyt Bagnall Scholarship Committee
John Rose Organ Scholarship	Trinity College
