= Primerica =

American multi-level marketing insurance company

Primerica, Inc.
- Formerly: American Can Company
- Type: Public
- Traded as: NYSE: PRI; S&P 400 Component
- Industry: Financial services; Multi-level marketing
- Founded: February 10, 1977; 49 years ago
- Headquarters: Duluth, Georgia, US
- Key people: D. Richard Williams; (chairman of the board); Glenn J. Williams; (CEO); Peter W. Schneider; (president); Tracy Tan; (CFO)
- Products: Insurance; Investment funds; Credit monitoring; Debt management plans
- Revenue: ▲US$ 2.71 billion (2021)
- Operating income: ▲US$ 511.12 million (2021)
- Net income: ▲US$ 373.36 million (2021)
- Total assets: ▲US$ 16.12 billion (2021)
- Total equity: ▲US$ 2.08 billion (2021)
- Number of employees: 2,891 (full-time; 2021); 558 (on-call & part-time; 2021)
- Website: primerica.com

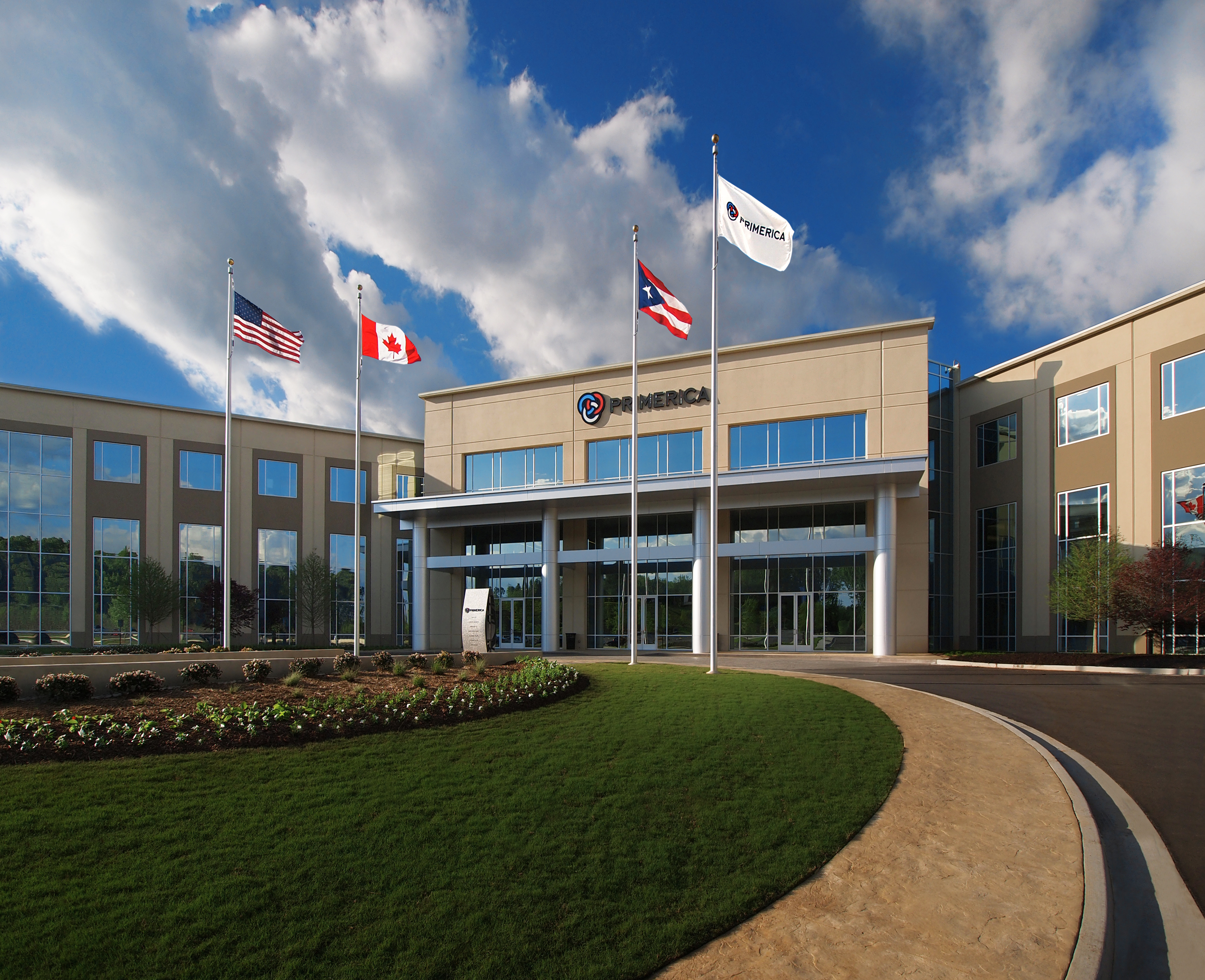
Primerica's headquarters building

Primerica, Inc. is a multi-level marketing company that provides insurance, investment and financial services to middle-income families in the United States and Canada.

Primerica is the parent company of National Benefit Life Insurance Company, Primerica Life, Peach Re, and Vidalia Re. Primerica acquired e-Telequote in July 2021. The company that would become Primerica was founded in 1981. Primerica had its initial public offering in 2010.

Primerica's headquarters are located in Duluth, Georgia.

== History ==
In 1980, A.L. Williams (founded in 1977) entered into a contract with Boston-based Massachusetts Indemnity and Life Insurance Company (MILICO), an underwriter of life insurance and a subsidiary of Santa Monica–based PennCorp Financial Services. In 1981, the company established First American National Corporation as a holding company for First American Life Insurance and First American National Securities. These companies were later renamed to the A.L. Williams Corporation, A.L. Williams Life Insurance Company, and PFS Investments, Inc, respectively. In 1982, the A.L. Williams Corporation was listed on the over-the-counter market under the symbol ALWC. In 1983, the company became listed on the NASDAQ exchange under the same symbol.

PennCorp finalized a merger agreement with American Can Company in 1983, and became its subsidiary along with MILICO. In 1986 Triangle Industries bought American Can's packaging division and the rights to the company's name. In 1987 American Can changed its name to Primerica Corporation, with Gerald Tsai as CEO, the first Chinese American to lead a member of the Dow Jones Industrials.

In December 1988, Sanford Weill's Commercial Credit acquired Primerica Corporation for $1.54 billion, retaining the Primerica name. On February 6, 1989, Primerica Corporation began trading on the New York Stock Exchange.

Throughout the next ten years, Primerica Corporation's affiliated companies A.L Williams, MILICO, and FANS changed their names to Primerica Financial Services, Primerica Life Insurance Company, and Primerica Financial Services Investments, respectively.

In December 1993, Primerica fully acquired Travelers Insurance Corporation and adopted the name Travelers Inc., which was changed to Travelers Group the following year. Travelers Group included Primerica Financial Services, Smith Barney, and other financial businesses. Joe Plumeri was chairman and CEO of Primerica Financial Services from 1995 to 1999. In 1998, Primerica had net income of $398 million on net sales of $1.65 billion.

In December 1997, Primerica announced it was going to begin offering pre-paid legal services through Pre-Paid Legal Services, Inc., at the time a subsidiary of Travelers Group, Inc. In 1998, the US Securities and Exchange Commission (SEC) censured and fined PFS Investments Inc., the securities arm for Primerica, for failure to properly supervise a group of registered representatives in Dearborn, Michigan. The SEC found that PFS Investments Inc. had failed to have in place effective policies and procedures to follow up adequately on three complaints received about the Dearborn registered representatives, "selling away" activities. By the date of the ruling, PFS Investments reported it had complied with the final recommendations made by the independent consultant.

In 1998, Travelers Group and Citicorp merged creating Citigroup (NYSE: C). Primerica and its affiliates continued to operate as subsidiaries of Citigroup, although the Travelers insurance business was spun off in 2002.

Citigroup attempted to sell Primerica in 2008, having received several bids from life insurance companies and private equity firms interested in buying. At the time the market value of the company was estimated to be $7 billion. JC Flowers & Co. LLC and Protective Life Corp began to purchase the company but the deal was canceled for undisclosed reasons.

During the COVID-19 pandemic, in 2020, Primerica paid out $1.7 billion in death claims. This was a 15.8% increase over 2019. The financial services company ended 2021 with $900 billion in active term life insurance.

=== Initial public offering ===
On November 5, 2009, Citi announced that it intended to spin off Primerica through an initial public offering. The first trading occurred on April 1, 2010, priced at $15 a share the day before trading. Citi raised $320 million through the IPO.

In a separate offering, private equity firm Warburg Pincus bought a 23-percent stake in Primerica, and had the option to purchase an additional 10-percent stake from Citi. On December 19, 2011, Citigroup sold its remaining equity stake in Primerica.

Primerica was listed by Forbes as one of "America's 50 Most Trustworthy Financial Companies" in 2015.

In July 2021, Primerica acquired e-Telequote, a health insurance marketer.

== Products and business model ==
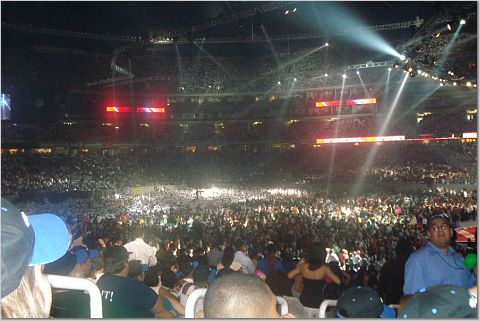
A Primerica convention in 2007

Primerica uses a multi-level marketing strategy, with eleven tiers of representatives and recruiters selling financial products and services for commission.

The company primarily sells term life insurance, as well as other financial services including auto and home insurance, mutual funds, and credit monitoring.

In 2010, Primerica was reported to have over 100,000 representatives selling the company's financial products, with individual earnings averaging $5,156 per year. Some people working for Primerica and similar multi-level marketing organizations reported that they ended up losing money, due to the fees they had to pay.

In 2012, Primerica was the target of multiple lawsuits alleging that the company's representatives sought to profit by earning commissions after convincing Florida firefighters, teachers, and other public workers to divest from safe government-secured retirement investments to high-risk retirement products offered by Primerica. In January 2014, the company announced that it was working on a settlement with up to 238 plaintiffs, for $15.4 million.

== See also ==
- Broker
- Financial institution
