= Hugh Ogden =

American poet

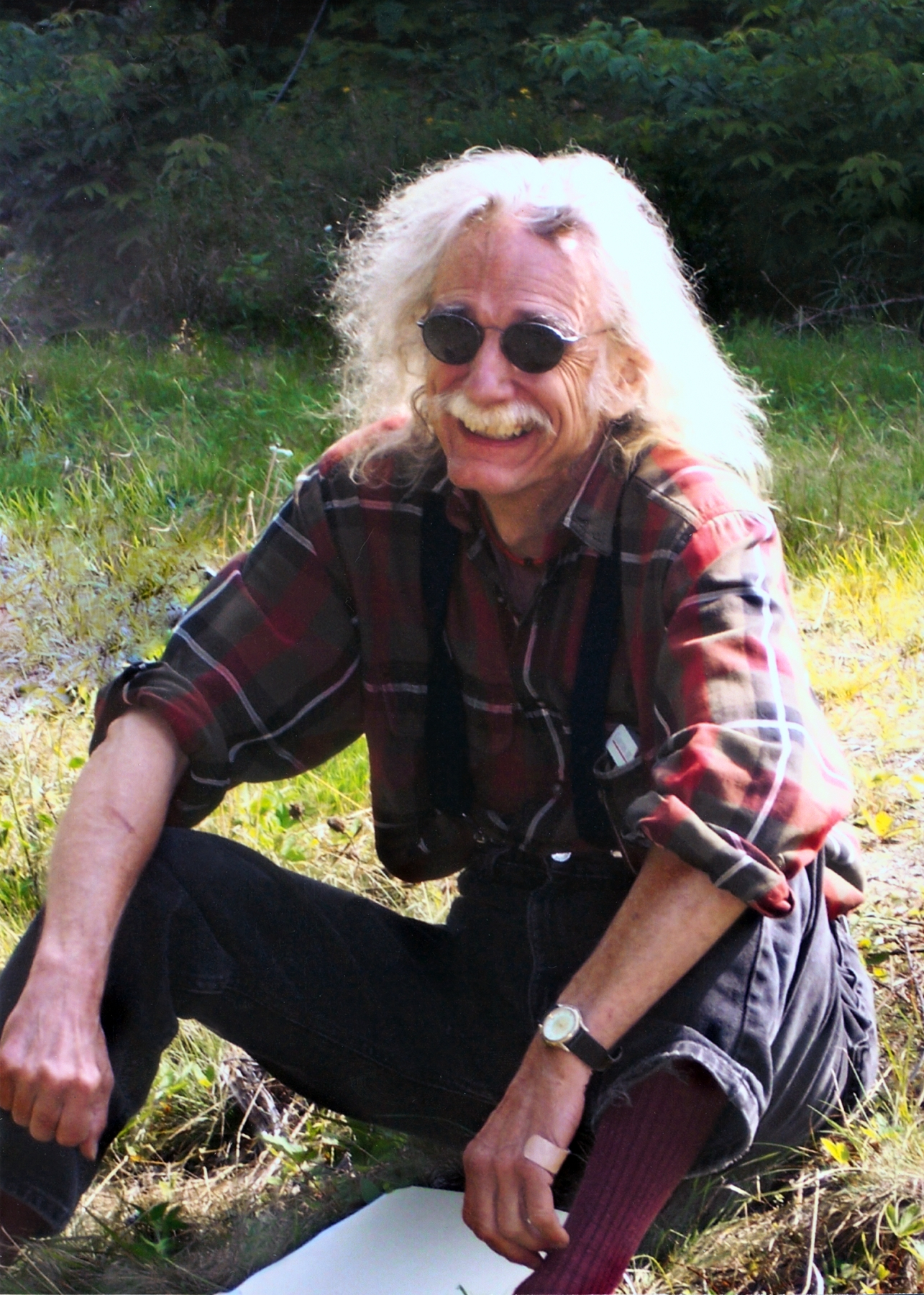

Hugh Ogden (March 11, 1937 – December 31, 2006) was an American poet and educator. Ogden was a 1959 graduate of Haverford College. Ogden received his master's degree from New York University and a Ph.D. from the University of Michigan. He taught at Michigan and then for four decades at Trinity College in Hartford. While at Trinity, Ogden co-founded the college's creative writing program in 1968.

Ogden was born in Erie, Pennsylvania. Ogden has written an estimated 400 to 500 poems, many of which have been published in small presses and magazines, and he has won a National Endowment for the Arts grant and two Connecticut Commission on the Arts Fellowships. In 1998, Ogden was nominated for the Pushcart Prize in Poetry.

Ogden died on December 31, 2006, after falling through the ice on Rangeley Lake in Oquossoc, Maine.

== Select publications ==
- Looking for History (1991)
- Two Roads and This Spring (1993)
- Windfalls (1996)
- Natural Things (1998)
- and Gift (1998)
- Bringing a Fir Straight Down (2004)
- Turtle Island Tree Psalms (2006)
