= Chameleon Arts Ensemble of Boston =

American classical chamber music ensemble

The Chameleon Arts Ensemble of Boston is a classical chamber music ensemble in Boston, Massachusetts. It was founded in 1998 by Artistic Director Deborah Boldin. After 15 years, Chameleon had produced 150 concerts with almost 400 different works by 105 composers.

Most Chameleon members perform in orchestras and as chamber musicians and soloists in the Boston area. Chameleon also frequently invites guest performers from the Chamber Music Society of Lincoln Center and soloists and chamber musicians from the United States and abroad.

Chameleon's subscription series, consisting of two performances each of five different programs, is held at First Church in Boston and the Goethe-Institut Boston between late September and mid-May each concert season.

Twice each year, Chameleon does an educational outreach program with three schools in the Boston Public Schools system,. The program culminates in concerts and an instrument petting zoo at Forsyth Chapel at Forest Hills Cemetery. The same concert is presented as a free family concert at the Hyde Park Branch of the Boston Public Library. Chameleon works with composer, storyteller and educator Hans Indigo Spencer to design the program. Spencer composes a new piece of music for each year's program.

Chameleon sponsors the Chameleons in the Community, an outreach effort to increase the accessibility of classical music . It has donated over 1000 thousand tickets to organizations such as the Pine Street Inn, the Metropolitan Boston Housing Partnership, and Project Step. Chameleon dedicates one concert in every season as a benefit for a local public service charity.

== Awards ==
- 2009 and 2007 Chamber Music America / ASCAP Awards for Adventurous Programming.
- Koussevitzky Foundation award
- Appointment as ensemble-in-residence for Northeastern University's Fusion Arts Exchange, a summer program for international students sponsored by the US State Department.

== Sources ==
- http://chameleonarts.org/index.html
- http://www.artsboston.org/org/detail/7109/Chameleon_Arts_Ensemble_of_Boston
- https://www.bostonglobe.com/arts/music/2014/05/18/chameleon-arts-ensemble-first-church-boston/wGLID1yHUcwEzCqygq4LCM/story.html
- http://bostonclassicalreview.com/2013/10/chameleon-arts-ensemble-offers-a-generous-paris-inspired-program/
