= Tsai Performance Center =

Concert hall in Boston University

Coordinates: 42.35020°N 71.10454°W

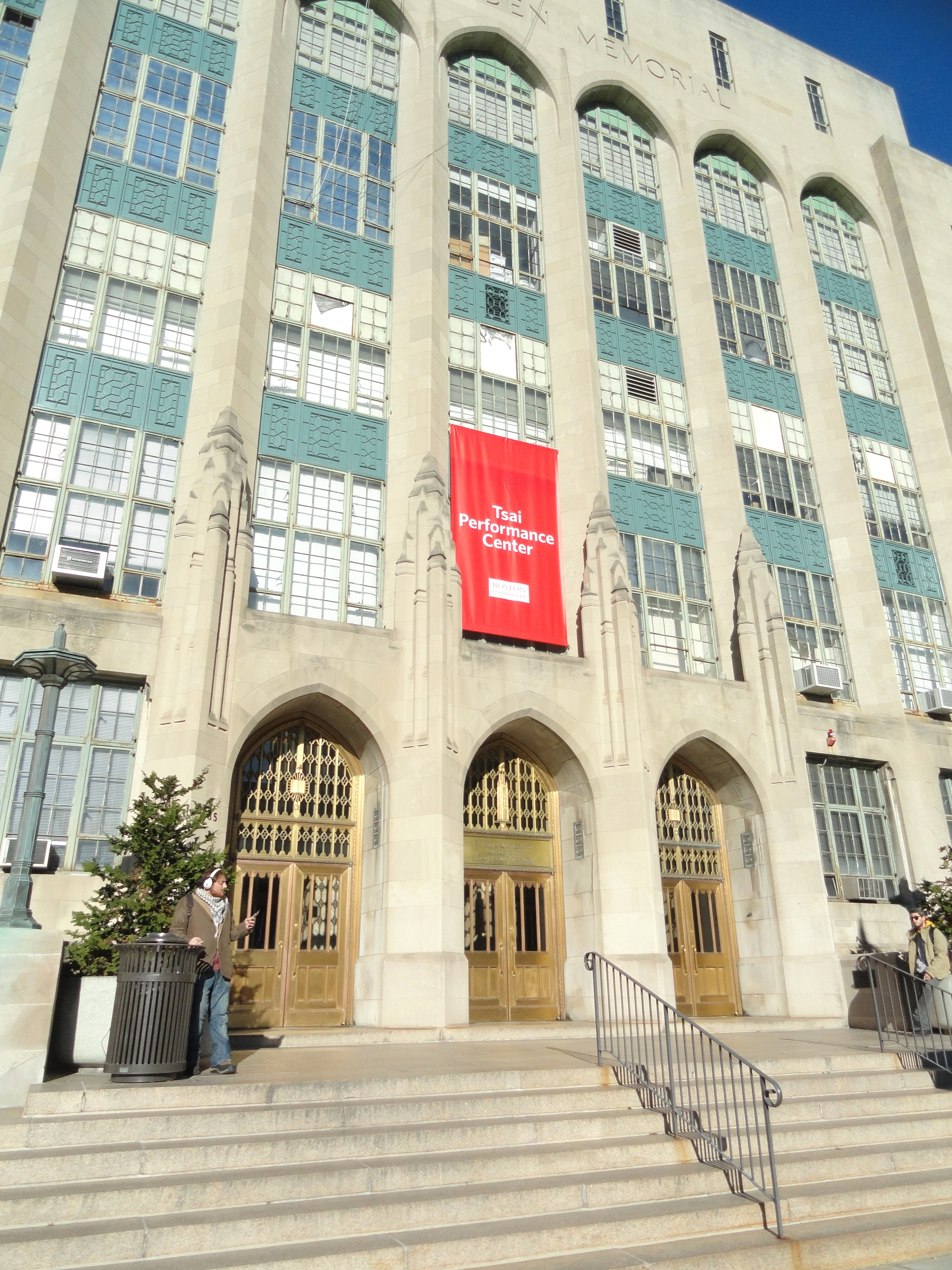
The exterior of the Tsai Performance Center

Tsai Performance Center is a concert hall located within Boston University's College of Arts and Sciences building. Constructed in 1989, the facility was made possible by a $5.5 million gift from the Tsai Family, particularly Gerald Tsai, who served as a trustee and an honorary board member of the university for a number of years. At the time, the Tsai pledge was the largest individual gift from a single donor in the history of Boston University. The Tsai Performance Center is the home of the New England Philharmonic.

== See also ==
- Gerald Tsai
