= Brad Jacobs (businessman) =

American businessman (born 1956)

- Born: August 3, 1956 (age 70); Providence, Rhode Island, U.S.
- Education: Northfield Mount Hermon School
- Alma mater: Bennington College; Brown University
- Occupation: Businessman

Brad Jacobs (born August 3, 1956) is an American businessman and entrepreneur who is chairman and CEO of QXO, Inc. He has founded eight separate billion-dollar companies, including XPO Logistics, United Rentals, and United Waste. In November 2026, Jacobs announced plans to launch his ninth company.

He is the author of the book, How to Make a Few Billion Dollars, published in 2024. A sequel, How to Make a Few More Billion Dollars, came out in 2025.

Jacobs is a member of Business Roundtable, The Business Council, and The Economic Club of New York.

== Early life and education ==
Jacobs was born in Providence, Rhode Island, to Charlotte Sybil (née Bander) and Albert Jordan Jacobs. Jacobs' father was a fashion jewelry importer. After graduating from Northfield Mount Hermon School in Gill, Massachusetts, he attended Bennington College in Bennington, Vermont and Brown University in Providence, Rhode Island. He studied math and music, but he dropped out in 1976.

== Career ==
=== Amerex Oil Associates (1979–1983) ===
In 1979, Jacobs co-founded Amerex Oil Associates, an oil brokerage firm. He was the company's CEO until it was sold in 1983. In 1984, he moved to London and founded Hamilton Resources, where he conducted oil trading deals. Jacobs has frequently recognized Ludwig Jesselson as being an influential mentor.

=== United Waste Systems (1989–1997) ===
In 1989, Jacobs founded United Waste Systems in Greenwich, Connecticut and began consolidating small waste collection companies that had overlapping routes in rural areas. He was chairman and CEO; in 1992 he took the company public. He sold United Waste Systems to USA Waste Services for $2.5 billion in August 1997.

=== United Rentals (1997) ===
In September 1997, Jacobs formed United Rentals becoming the chairman and chief executive officer of the company. During late 1997 and early 1998, the company grew through a strategy of consolidating equipment rental dealers in North America. He took the company public in December 1997 on the New York Stock Exchange.

=== XPO ===
In 2011, he invested approximately $150 million in XPO (then named Express-1 Expedited Solutions), a transportation and third-party logistics provider. He became chairman of the board and CEO and gained ownership of approximately 71 percent of the company. The company was later listed on the NYSE under the ticker symbol XPO. Jacobs subsequently led the $7 billion spin-off of GXO Logistics in 2021, and the $5 billion spin-off of RXO in 2022.

=== QXO (2024–present) ===
In June 2024, Jacobs founded QXO with the intention to consolidate the $800 billion building products distribution industry. With the launch, he raised over $5 billion in equity. That included what Bloomberg said was the largest equity offering ever in the building products sector and the largest ever private investment in public equity (PIPE) for an industrial company. In April 2025, QXO acquired Beacon Building Products, the second-largest distributor of roofing, waterproofing, and related exterior building products in North America, for approximately $11 billion. In April 2026, QXO acquired Kodiak Building Partners,the fourth-largest distributor of lumber and complementary building materials in the United States, for $2.25 billion. In July 2026, QXO acquired TopBuild, the largest distributor and installer of insulation and specialty building products in North America, for approximately $17 billion.

=== New venture (2026–present) ===
In November 2026, Jacobs announced plans to lead a $1 billion equity investment to launch his ninth company, while continuing to serve as chairman and CEO of QXO.

== Personal life ==
Brad Jacobs and his wife live in Greenwich, Connecticut and they have four children. He is an art collector and owns art by Picasso, de Kooning, Calder, Lichtenstein, and other artists.

== Bibliography ==
- How to Make a Few Billion Dollars; Austin: Greenleaf Book Group Press, 2024; ISBN 979-8886451740
- How to Make a Few More Billion Dollars; Austin: Greenleaf Book Group Press, 2025; ISBN 979-8-88645-465-9
