= Andy Vores =

Welsh composer (born 1956)

- Born: 1956 (age 69–70)
- Education: Lancaster University
- Occupations: Classical and opera composer

Andy Vores (born 1956) is a Welsh classical music and opera composer. He has lived in the United States since 1986 and is based in Boston, Massachusetts.

== Education ==
Vores studied composition at Lancaster University in Lancaster, England. He initially focused on playing drums and keyboards in local rock bands, but his studies under the tutelage of composer Edward Cowie switched his focus to writing classical music. He received first prize in the Kucyna International Composition Competition at Boston University in 1985, and the following year he returned to Massachusetts as a Fellow in Composition at Tanglewood. His work Hammer and Darkness, Mirror and Knife, written in the summer of 1986, won the Tanglewood Prize for Composition. Also in 1986, he met pianist Patricia Thom, whom he later married, and decided to take up residence in the U.S.

== Appointments ==
In 1992, Vores became composer-in-residence at Bemidji State University in Bemidji, Minnesota. In this one-year position, he was first person to receive the Interdisciplinary Fellowship established by the American Composers Forum and the Minnesota State University System. In 1999, Vores was named composer-in-residence to the FleetBoston Celebrity Series: Emerging Artists in Boston. In 2001, he became Chairman of Composition and Theory at The Boston Conservatory. In 2002, he was named composer-in-residence to the New England Philharmonic.

== Operas ==
On December 2, 1994, Vores presented his first opera Freshwater, an adaptation of the Virginia Woolf play of the same name, at Boston University. Vores first came across the Woolf text while browsing the shelves of the Boston University bookstore. He received assistance in the opera's creation from Woolf's nephew and executor, Quentin Bell, who provided Vores with a rarely seen earlier version of the text that served as the inspiration for several passages of his libretto.

On April 24, 2008, Vores presented his latest opera, a one-act chamber opera adaptation of Jean-Paul Sartre’s No Exit, at the Boston Conservatory's Zack Box Theatre.

== Classical compositions ==
Vores' classical compositions include Wonder Wheel, Umberhulk and Dark Mother. His first CD, Urban Affair, a classical work consisting of nine movements, was released on the Vera label in 2005. Urban Affair was commissioned as part of the Bank of America Celebrity Series and was performed for the CD by the Boston Trio.
