= Coro Allegro =

Coro Allegro is a classical chorus based in Boston, Massachusetts, that draws its members from the LGBTQ+ and allied community. It was founded in 1991.

== Profile ==
Coro Allegro was originally founded as a chorus of gay men and lesbians who share a passion for music and has since expanded to include both members of the LGBTQ+ community and allies. It remains the only organization in Boston serving to bring classical repertoire to the LGBTQ+ community, though its work appeals to a broader audience. In its first 20 years, Coro Allegro grew from just 20 singers to more than 60.

== Premieres and commissions ==
Since its founding in 1991, Coro Allegro has performed 28 world premieres, including 18 works commissioned by or for the chorus, plus an additional three American premieres and five Boston premieres. Notable premieres include:

- Kenneth Fuchs' Three Songs on Robert Frost Texts (1994)
- Kenneth Fuchs' In the Clearing (1995)
- Daniel Pinkham's The White Raven (1996)
- Ruth Lomon's Requiem (1997)
- Patricia Van Ness's The Voice of the Tenth Muse (1998)
- Charles Fussell’s Infinite Fraternity (2003)
- David Brunner's The Wheel (2004)
- Patricia Van Ness's Requiem (2004)
- Robert Stern’s Shofar (2006)
- Fred Onovwerosuoke's A Triptych of American Voices: A Cantata of the People (2019)
- Andrea Clearfield's Here I Am: I Am Here (2022)
- Kareem Roustom's There Will Come Soft Rains (2025)

== Awards ==
- Chorus America/ASCAP Alice Parker Award (2012)
- Chorus America/ASCAP Award for Adventurous Programming (2019)
- Choral Arts New England Board Grant (2021)
- Choral Arts New England Lorna Cooke deVaron Grant (2026)

== Pinkham Award ==
In 2008, Coro Allegro established the Daniel Pinkham Award, which is awarded annually to an outstanding contributor to classical choral music and the LGBTQ+ community. The award is given in memory of Daniel Pinkham, the acclaimed and beloved Boston composer, musical director, and organist. Award recipients include:

- Sanford Sylvan (2008)
- Bishop Gene Robinson (2009)
- Fenwick Smith (2010)
- Patricia Van Ness (2011)
- Donald Teeters (2012)
- David Hodgkins (2013)
- Laury Gutiérrez (2014)
- Lorna Cooke deVaron (2015)
- Janson Wu (2016)
- Catherine Peterson (2017)
- Robin Godfrey (2018)
- Darryl Hollister (2019)
- GALA Choruses Board & Staff (2021)
- Sam Brinton (2022)
- Reginald Mobley (2024)
- Kenneth Fuchs (2025)

== Collaborations ==
Coro Allegro regularly collaborates with other musical ensembles. Among its most notable collaborations are the performances of:

- Mendelssohn’s Elijah with the Boston Cecilia and the Handel and Haydn Society under the direction of Christopher Hogwood (1999)
- Robert Kapilow's baseball cantata, a setting of Casey at the Bat for chorus, with Boston Musica Viva in collaboration with choreographer Daniel Pelzig for the Celebrity Series of Boston (2001)
- Brahms’ German Requiem with Boston Cecilia under the direction of Donald Teeters (2003)
- Poulenc's Gloria and Bernstein's Chichester Psalms with Boston Cecilia (2004)
- Pablo Ortiz's Leaving Limerick in the Rain with the Terezín Music Foundation at Liberation: A Concert Honoring the 70th Anniversary of the Liberation of the Nazi Camps in Boston Symphony Hall
- William Grant Still's And They Lynched Him on a Tree with The Heritage Chorale of New Haven (1999, 2019)

Coro Allegro has performed with the Boston Landmarks Orchestra on the Boston Common and at the Edward A. Hatch Memorial Shell. The chorus has also collaborated with the Back Bay Ringers, the Boston City Singers, the Boston Gay Men’s Chorus, Chorus Pro Musica, City on a Hill Charter School Chorus, La Donna Musicale, Pro Arte Chamber Orchestra, Rumbarroco, Toronto Children’s Chorus, and the United Parish Chancel Choir.

== GALA Choruses festivals ==
Coro Allegro participates in the quadrennial GALA Choruses festival.

- Tampa, Florida (1996)
- San Jose, California (2000)
- Place des Arts, Montreal, Quebec (2004)
- Adrienne Arsht Center for the Performing Arts, Miami, Florida (2008)
- Denver Performing Arts Complex, Denver, Colorado (2012)
- Denver Performing Arts Complex, Denver, Colorado (2016)
- Minneapolis, Minnesota (2024)
