= David von Behren =

American organist and scholar

- Born: 28 April 1994; Falls City, Nebraska
- Education: Cleveland Institute of Music Yale University Boston University
- Occupations: Assistant University Organist and Choirmaster of Memorial Church of Harvard University
- Organizations: Harvard University; Harvard Glee Club
- Website: https://www.davidvonbehren.com/

David Michael von Behren (born April 28, 1994) is an American organist and scholar, currently serving as the Assistant University Organist and Choirmaster of the Memorial Church at Harvard University.

== Early life ==
A native of Falls City, Nebraska, David von Behren developed an early interest in music due to his mother's involvement as a local church organist and received his initial musical training on the violin and piano. In high school, he appeared on NPR's From the Top, where he received the Jack Kent Cooke Young Artist Award.

== Education and career ==
David von Behren earned a bachelor of music degree in organ performance and music theory (double degree) from the Cleveland Institute of Music (CIM), studying under the guidance of renowned organist Todd Wilson. During his time at CIM, he demonstrated extraordinary talent and creativity, becoming the first organist to be honored with the prestigious Darius Milhaud Award. This award recognizes individuals who exhibit outstanding musical accomplishment, dedication to the musical arts, and evidence of academic excellence.

He earned a master of music degree at the Yale University School of Music/Institute of Sacred Music where, under the mentorship of Martin Jean, he studied organ performance, and with Jeffrey Brillhart, he explored the art of improvisation. Subsequently, he pursued a doctor of musical arts degree at Boston University College of Fine Arts, studying with the esteemed organist Peter Sykes.

David von Behren served as organ scholar at Trinity Church on the Green in New Haven, Connecticut under the direction of choirmaster Walden Moore and worked with the Trinity Choir of Men & Boys and Choir of Men & Girls. Prior to his appointment at Trinity on the Green, he served four years as organ scholar at Plymouth Church UCC in Shaker Heights, Ohio. He is currently the Assistant University Organist and Choirmaster of the Memorial Church at Harvard University, where he works extensively with Harvard’s University Choir. He has also served as the accompanist and teaching fellow to the Harvard Glee Club and the Harvard Choruses.

In addition to his work as a performer and organist, von Behren has also published academic articles in journals such as the American Organist from the Journal of the American Guild of Organists. Much of his academic work is focused on the music of Nicolaus Bruhns, a German composer who extensively composed for the organ. As a violinist and an organist, von Behren brings his insights from both instruments to research works written for organ and strings, including some works he believes were written for a single musician simultaneously playing both the organ and violin.

== Musical achievements and albums ==
During his education, David von Behren received several awards, including being named among the top 20 organists under 30, the 2018 Mary Baker Prize in Organ Accompanying, and the 2019 Richard Paul DeLong Prize in Church Music.

David von Behren's musical accomplishments extend beyond his academic pursuits. He has released several albums that showcase his virtuosity and passion for the organ. Notably, his album "French Flourishes from First Plymouth," released in 2021, gained recognition and was featured on American Public Media's program "Pipedreams." Additionally, he released two more albums, "American Adventures: An Organ Album" and "Merry Melodies for Advent and Christmas," both in 2022, further solidifying his reputation as a celebrated organist. His most recent album released in 2023, "Psalm-Sonata & Suites", explores and presents works from living American composers, including Brenda Portman, Marianne Kim, Tom Trenney, and Dan Locklair. David is also a seasoned performer who has captivated audiences across the United States and Europe with his enthralling organ concerts. He has had the privilege of collaborating with esteemed musicians, such as Grammy-winning clarinetist Franklin Cohen at the Cleveland ChamberFest Verve Gala. His live radio performance on National Public Radio's (NPR) From the Top reached over half a million listeners, garnering widespread acclaim for his artistry.

== Advocacy and outreach ==
Beyond his musical accomplishments, David von Behren actively advocates for introducing classical music to younger audiences. In 2013, he initiated "The Little Stars Summer Program," a music program designed for children aged 3 to 11 in Falls City, Nebraska, in collaboration with NPR's "From the Top" and The Jack Kent Cooke Foundation. He is passionate about nurturing a love for music among the youth and frequently participates in teaching faculties for POEs (Pipe Organ Encounters) and various organ camps and festivals.

== Personal life ==
In his leisure time, David enjoys traveling, scuba diving, and participates in half marathons, where he adds a creative touch by running costumed as various superheroes. He maintains an organ studio in the Boston area.
