= Daniel Pinkham =

American composer

- Born: Daniel Rogers Pinkham Jr. June 5, 1923; Lynn, Massachusetts, U.S.
- Died: December 18, 2006 (aged 83); Natick, Massachusetts, U.S.
- Partner: Andrew Paul Holman

Academic background
- Education: Harvard University (AB, MA)

Academic work
- Institutions: Boston Conservatory; New England Conservatory of Music; Simmons University; Harvard University; Boston University
- Notable students: Gigi Gryce
- Website: Daniel Pinkham

Daniel Rogers Pinkham Jr. (June 5, 1923 – December 18, 2006) was an American composer, organist, and harpsichordist.

== Early life and education ==
Born in Lynn, Massachusetts, into a prominent family engaged in the manufacture of patent medicines (his great-grandmother was Lydia E. Pinkham), he studied organ performance and music theory at Phillips Academy with Carl F. Pfatteicher. "The single event that changed my life was a concert [at Andover] by the Trapp Family Singers in 1939, right after they had escaped from Germany," Pinkham once recalled. "Here, suddenly, I was hearing clarity, simplicity. It shaped my whole outlook," he said in a 1981 interview with The Boston Globe.

At Harvard University, he studied with Walter Piston; Aaron Copland, Archibald T. Davison, and Arthur Tillman Merritt were also among his teachers. There he completed a bachelor's degree in 1942 and a master's in 1944. He also studied harpsichord with Putnam Aldrich and Wanda Landowska, and organ with E. Power Biggs. At Tanglewood, he studied composition with Samuel Barber and Arthur Honegger, and subsequently with Nadia Boulanger.

== Career ==
Pinkham taught at the Boston Conservatory beginning in 1946, and at the New England Conservatory of Music from 1959 until his death in 2006; while there, he created and chaired the program on early music performance. In 1951, Pinkham conducted ten works by Boulanger Award winners in their Boston performance première in a special Peabody Mason Concert series commemorating the Paris Bi-Millennial year. He also taught at various times at Simmons University (1953–1954), Boston University (1953–1954), and Harvard University (1957–1958). Among Pinkham's notable students were the jazz musician and composer Gigi Gryce (1925–1983) and the composer Mark DeVoto.

For forty-two years (1958–2000), Pinkham was the organist of King's Chapel in Boston, a position which gave him much exposure to and opportunity to write church-related music; the Sunday evening concert series he created there celebrated its 50th anniversary in 2007. He was also a frequent guest on the E. Power Biggs program on the CBS Radio Network. He performed regularly with the Boston Symphony Orchestra as an organist and as a harpsichordist, and he performed extensively with noted violinist Robert Brink, with whom he commissioned a duo for violin and harpsichord from Alan Hovhaness.

=== Compositions ===
Pinkham's output represents a broad cross-section of 20th-century musical trends. He produced work in virtually every genre, from symphonies to art songs, though the preponderance of his music is religious in nature, frequently choral and/or involving organ. Much of his music was written for use in church services or other ceremonial occasions, and reflected his longstanding relationship with King's Chapel. At various points in his career, he embraced plainchant, medievally-influenced modal writing, and 17th-century forms (in the 1930s and 40s, under the influence of Stravinsky and Hindemith and reflecting his commitment to the early music revival), dodecaphony and serialism (in the 1950s and 60s), electronic music (beginning in 1970), and the neo-baroque idiom.

Some of Pinkham's best-known works are designed for services: the Christmas, Advent, and Wedding cantatas, the latter of which is performed particularly often. In 2003, he gained further notice with his commissioned piece, written for the Boston Landmarks Orchestra, of Make Way for Ducklings. In keeping with the name of the ensemble, the work was designed to be performed for families at the Boston Public Garden, near the famous sculptures based on Robert McCloskey's endearing picture book.

Pinkham's scholarship and work were recognized with a Fulbright Fellowship in 1950 and a Ford Foundation Fellowship in 1962. He received honorary degrees from the New England Conservatory of Music as well as from Nebraska Wesleyan University, Adrian College, Westminster Choir College, Ithaca College, and the Boston Conservatory.

Pinkham's 1949 song cycle Slow, Slow, Fresh Fount was dedicated to the soprano Verna Osborne. In 1971, he wrote The Other Voices of the Trumpet for trumpet, organ, and tape, for the inaugural International Contemporary Organ Music Festival at the Hartt School of Music. In 1982, he returned to the Hartt festival to give a lecture about his own harpsichord music. In 1990, Pinkham was named Composer of the Year by the American Guild of Organists. In 1995, he was awarded the Brock Commission from the American Choral Directors Association. In 2006 Pinkham was named Musician of the Year by the Boston Musicians' Association, AFM Local 9-535.

== Personal life ==
Pinkham died in Natick, Massachusetts, of chronic lymphocytic leukemia, at the age of 83. He is survived by his longtime partner, the organist Andrew Paul Holman.
