= Harvard–Radcliffe Collegium Musicum =

Choral ensemble

Harvard-Radcliffe Collegium Musicum
- Choir
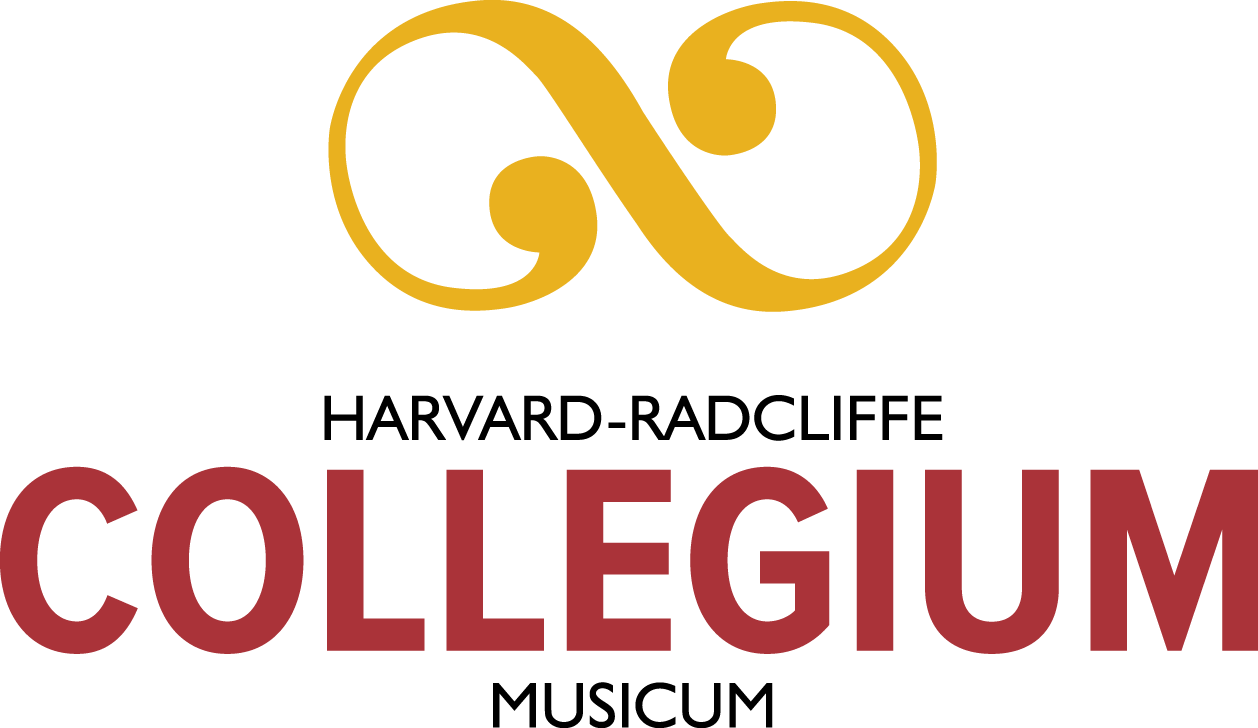
- Origin: Cambridge, Massachusetts, United States
- Founded: 1971; 55 years ago
- President: Alex Heuss '26
- Music director: Andrew Clark, Hana Cai
- Manager: Iris Xue '28
- Rehearsal space: Holden Chapel
- Concert hall: Sanders Theatre
- Affiliation: Harvard University
- Associated groups: Harvard Choruses
- Website: hrcm.org

The Harvard–Radcliffe Collegium Musicum (Collegium or HRCM) is a mixed chorus at Harvard University, composed of roughly 50 voices from undergraduate and graduate student populations. Founded in 1971 to coincide with the coeducational merger of Harvard and Radcliffe College, Collegium drew from members of the Harvard Glee Club and the Radcliffe Choral Society to form a smaller mixed group that could represent Harvard on tours. Although Collegium used to perform primarily early Renaissance music, its repertoire now draws from centuries of a cappella and orchestral selections. Together with the (tenor-bass) Harvard Glee Club and the (soprano-alto) Radcliffe Choral Society, it is a member of the Harvard Choruses.

== History ==
F. John Adams served as Collegium's conductor from its founding until 1978, when Jameson Marvin became Harvard's Director of Choral Activities. The group rose to prominence during Marvin's thirty-two-year tenure, receiving critical acclaim through recordings, international tours, and numerous invited appearances at professional conferences. Andrew Clark became Collegium's third conductor in 2010 and has led the ensemble in performances of Bach's Saint Matthew Passion, Handel's Israel in Egypt, Mozart's Requiem, Haydn's The Creation, Rachmaninoff's All-Night Vigil (Vespers), and Arvo Pärt's Saint John Passion, as well as in appearances at Boston's Jordan Hall, the Metropolitan Museum of Art in New York, Salzburg Cathedral, and St. Stephen's Cathedral in Vienna.

== Recent concert seasons ==
=== 2019–2020 ===
On March 7, 2020, Collegium held a closed concert to an empty Sanders Theater due to mounting fears from administration at Harvard University about COVID-19. The group persisted with the performance, live-streaming the event to over a thousand viewers from around the world. It was at this concert that they debuted the piece Wander composed by Harvard Undergraduate Ian Chan, and presented To the Hands by Caroline Shaw and Mozart's Requiem as completed by German composer Michael Ostrzyga.

=== 2018–2019 ===
As in recent even-numbered years, Collegium collaborated with the Radcliffe Choral Society for a programmatic fall concert. This concert, Compassion, featured Monteverdi's Sestina Lagrima d'Amante and Bach's motet Der Geist Hilft. In the winter, Collegium presented the East Coast Premiere of How to Go On, an a cappella secular requiem by Dale Trumbore. On May 3, 2019, Collegium joined forces with all the Harvard Choruses to perform Vaughan Williams' indomitable Sea Symphony.

=== 2016–2017 ===
Collegium began the year with One Music: A moving mosaic celebrating the gift of song, which featured the world premiere of Harvard alumnus Robert Kyr's In the Name of Music. The winter was dedicated to preparing J. S. Bach's monumental B Minor Mass, which Collegium performed with a full period orchestra on March 31, 2017. The season concluded with Michael Tippett's A Child of Our Time in collaboration with the Harvard Glee Club, Radcliffe Choral Society, Boston Modern Orchestra Project, and Boston Children's Chorus.

=== 2015–2016 ===
In the 2015–2016 academic year, Collegium sang Tigran Mansurian's Requiem with the Boston Modern Orchestra Project, in a memorial concert commemorating the 100th anniversary of the Armenian genocide. On December 4, 2015, Collegium performed Handel's Messiah. In the spring of 2016, Collegium performed at the Boston ACDA Convention and sang the fusion-oratorio Considering Matthew Shepard under the direction of its composer, Craig Hella Johnson. Collegium's season concluded with a performance of Aaron Copland's In the Beginning with mezzo-soprano soloist Maddie Studt '16.

=== 2014–2015 ===
Collegium began its 2014–2015 season with Requiescat, a concert of a cappella works including Herbert Howells' Requiem. This was followed by a performance of Bach motets under the direction of John Eliot Gardiner. On February 28, 2015, Collegium performed Brahms with the Harvard-Radcliffe Orchestra, Harvard Glee Club, and Radcliffe Choral Society. In collaboration with the Boston Children's Chorus and Harvard Dance Project, Collegium performed a concert of American battle hymns. Finally, Collegium presented a concert of Brazilian works in preparation for its upcoming tour to Brazil.

=== 2013–2014 ===
In the 2013–2014 academic year, Collegium toured Baltimore and Washington DC to participate in the American Choral Directors Association Convention. On April 11, 2014, Collegium collaborated with Joyful Noise, a choir composed of adults with neurological and physical disabilities. Collegium also sang Verdi's Requiem with the other Harvard Choruses, the Harvard Glee Club and Radcliffe Choral Society, during Harvard's annual visiting weekend.

== Tours ==
Collegium embarks on an international tour every four years, planned by student tour managers. In its history, Collegium has traveled on twelve international tours, working and performing with local choirs in addition to performing independently.

Tour Location	Cities	Year
Sweden	Tobo, Stockholm, Piteå, Karlskrona	2023
South Africa	Nylsvley, Polokwane, Haenertsburg, Drakensberg, Johannesburg, Cape Town	2019
Brazil	São Paulo, Porto Alegre, Rio de Janeiro, Curitiba	2015
Germany and Austria	Berlin, Cologne, Frankfurt am Main (Hoch Conservatory), Munich, Salzburg, Vienna	2011
Australia and New Zealand		2007
France and the Iberian Peninsula		2003
Italy and Greece		1999
Great Britain		1995
Mexico		1991
Canada		1986
The Mediterranean		1981
Europe		1976

== Management ==
The Harvard–Radcliffe Collegium Musicum is an independent 501(c)(3) organization, managed and overseen entirely by undergraduate students.
