= Harvardiana =

Harvardiana refers to things associated with the Harvard University. These include:

- Harvardiana, a literary magazine published from 1835 to 1838.
- Harvardiana, a fight song.
