= Edward Elwyn Jones =

Welsh conductor and organist

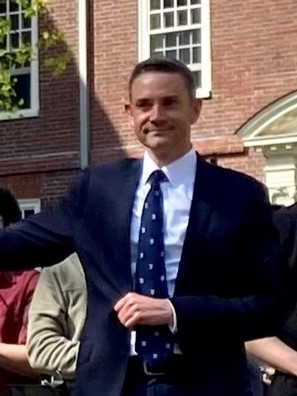
Jones in 2024

Edward Elwyn Jones (born 27 April 1977) is a Welsh conductor and organist.

== Life and work ==
Edward Elwyn Jones is a conductor, organist and choirmaster. As the Gund University Organist and Choirmaster at Harvard University, a post he has held since 2003, Jones directs the music program in Memorial Church, located in the midst of Harvard Yard, and leads the 180-year-old Harvard University Choir in its daily choral services, broadcasts, tours, commissions, and recordings. Recently appointed music director of Lowell House Opera, New England's longest-running opera company, Jones also serves as artistic director of the Harvard Radcliffe Chorus, and is a frequent collaborator with Yale's Schola Cantorum. He served as the guest conductor of the Harvard Glee Club during the spring academic semester of 2024. As a conductor, he has guested with such organizations as the Boston Modern Orchestra Project, Grand Harmonie, Pro Arte Chamber Orchestra of Boston, Boston Camerata, Emmanuel Music, Longwood Symphony Orchestra and the Handel and Haydn Society Orchestra.

Jones studied music at the University of Cambridge, where he was Organ Scholar of Emmanuel College. He was also the conductor of three university orchestras. Upon moving to the United States in 1998, Jones served firstly as Organ Scholar and then as Assistant Organist in the Memorial Church at Harvard University.

Jones was the Assistant Organist of Christ Church United Methodist on Park Avenue in New York City from 2000 to 2003, while earning a master's degree in orchestral conducting at Mannes College of Music. Jones has focused particularly on conducting opera, which he has pursued with the Harvard Early Music Society, Mannes Opera, Lowell House Opera Society, and the Reykjavík Summer Opera Festival in Iceland.

In April 2003, Jones was appointed Gund University Organist and Choirmaster of the Memorial Church at Harvard University. In this position, Jones is the current director of the Harvard University Choir. Jones was appointed music director of Lowell House Opera in 2015.
