= Cecilia Society =

The Cecilia Society may refer to:

- Boston Cecilia, Boston-based choral society, founded in 1876
- St. Cecilia Society, Charleston-based choral society, founded in 1766
