= Patricia Van Ness =

American composer

Patricia Van Ness (born 1951) is an American composer living in Saco, Maine, U.S.A. She is also the Staff Composer for First Church in Cambridge, Massachusetts.

Van Ness's work draws upon elements of medieval and Renaissance music. She primarily composes vocal music, and has received especial acclaim for her work for women's voices. Her works have been commissioned and performed around the world, including by The King's Singers (UK), the Heidelberg New Music Festival Ensemble, Renaissance Men, Chanticleer, and the Mannerquartett Schnittpunktvokal (Austria), in the Celebrity Series in Boston, at the Spoleto Festival Orchestra, and by Peter Sykes, Coro Allegro, and the Harvard University Choir.

Van Ness has received numerous awards and grants, including the 2011 Daniel Pinkham Award from Coro Allegro. Her nine-movement work "Nine Orders of the Angels" was included by the ensemble Tapestry on their recording "Sapphire Night," which received Europe's prestigious 2005 Echo Klassik Prize. Chamber Music America awarded "Album of the Year" to Tapestry's The Fourth River, which contained two of Van Ness's works.

Her commissions include works for women's voices ("Nine Orders of the Angels," premiered by Tapestry, 1996; "May We Live In Peace," premiered by Boston Landmarks Orchestra, 2003), men's voices ("The Phoenix," commissioned by the Boston Athenaeum, 2002), and mixed choir ("The Voice of the Tenth Muse," premiered by Coro Allegro, 1998). Her music has been included on recordings by Chanticleer, Coro Allegro, the Harvard University Choir, The King's Singers, Tapestry, The Choir of First Church Cambridge, Mannerquartet Schnittpunktvokal, and the Radcliffe Choral Society.

Prior to her work in choral music, Patricia (then known as Patti), was a violinist and vocalist with the Boston-based rock band Private Lightning, which released one album on A&M Records in 1980.
