= Jameson Marvin =

Jameson Neil Marvin
- Born: 1941 (age 84–85)
- Occupation: Conductor
- Website: http://jamesonmarvin.com

Jameson Neil Marvin (born 1941, Glendale CA) is an American choral conductor, composer, arranger, and editor. Between 1978 and 2010, Marvin directed the Harvard Glee Club, the Radcliffe Choral Society, and the Harvard-Radcliffe Collegium Musicum (collectively the Holden Choruses) and has also taught choral conducting at Harvard University. He received a Doctor of Musical Arts degree in Choral Music from the University of Illinois, a Master of Arts in Choral Conducting from Stanford University, and a Bachelor of Arts in Music Composition from the University of California, Santa Barbara. He has worked with Howard Swan and Robert Shaw, and his students have gone on to lead major choruses throughout the country. With the Holden Choruses, he has made nearly a dozen appearances at conventions of the American Choral Directors Association, including six national conventions. His academic specialty is the music of the Renaissance, and he serves as principal editor of the Oxford Music Renaissance series. Marvin retired from Harvard at the end of the 2009-2010 academic school year.

After his retirement from Harvard at the end of the 2009-10 academic school year, Marvin formed a mixed choir composed mostly of amateur singers, called the Jameson Singers, which is unaffiliated with any academic institution.
