= Katherine Kennicott Davis =

American classical composer (1892–1980)

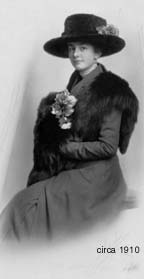
- Born: June 25, 1892; St. Joseph, Missouri, U.S.
- Died: April 20, 1980 (aged 87); Littleton, Massachusetts, U.S.
- Occupations: Composer; pianist; arranger; teacher
- Known for: "Carol of the Drum", later known as "The Little Drummer Boy"

Katherine Kennicott Davis (June 25, 1892 – April 20, 1980) was an American composer, pianist, arranger, and teacher, whose best-known composition is the Christmas song "Carol of the Drum", later known as "The Little Drummer Boy".

== Life and career ==
Katherine Davis was born in St. Joseph, Missouri, on June 25, 1892, to Maxwell Gaddis Davis and Jesse Foote Barton. She composed her first piece of music, "Shadow March", at the age of 15. She graduated from St. Joseph Central High School in 1910. She then went on to study music at Wellesley College in Massachusetts. In 1914, she won the college's Billings Prize, a prize still offered each year to an outstanding Wellesley College music student. After graduation, she continued at Wellesley as an assistant in the Music Department, teaching music theory and piano; at the same time, she studied at the New England Conservatory of Music in Boston, Massachusetts. Davis also studied with Nadia Boulanger in Paris, France. She taught music at the Concord Academy in Concord, Massachusetts, and at the Shady Hill School for Girls in Philadelphia, Pennsylvania.

She became a member of ASCAP in 1941.

Katherine Davis was conferred an honorary doctorate from Stetson University, in DeLand, Florida.

Davis continued writing music until she became ill, in the winter of 1979–1980. She died on April 20, 1980, at the age of 87, in Littleton, Massachusetts. She left all of the royalties and proceeds from her compositions (which include operas, choruses, children's operettas, cantatas, piano and organ pieces, and songs), to Wellesley College's Music Department, to support students studying musical performance.

== Music ==
Many of her over 600 compositions were written for the choirs at her school. She was actively involved in The Concord Series, multiple-volume set of music and books for educational purposes. Many of the musical volumes were compiled, arranged, and edited by Davis with Archibald T. Davison, and they were published by E.C. Schirmer in Boston.

She wrote "The Little Drummer Boy" (originally titled "The Carol of the Drum"), in 1941. It became famous when recorded by the Harry Simeone Chorale in 1958: the recording went to the top of the Billboard charts and Simeone insisted on a writer's royalty for his arrangement of the song.

Davis also wrote the Thanksgiving hymn "Let All Things Now Living", which uses the melody of the traditional Welsh folk song "The Ash Grove".

== Musical compositions ==
=== Large works ===
- Children of Bethlehem, Christmas cantata for children's voices, 1973, Broadman Press
- The Drummer, Christmas play with music for soloists, mixed chorus (SATB), organ or piano and handbells, 1966, Mills Music
- This is Noel, carol cantata for SATB voice, SB solos, optional oboe, piano or organ, 1935, Remick Music
- The Unmusical Impresario, musical comedy in one act, 1956, G. Schirmer
- Who is Jesus?, Easter cantata for children's voices, 1974, Broadman Press

=== Sacred songs for voice and piano or organ ===
- Be Ye Kind, One to Another (Ephesians 4: 32, 31), 1948, Galaxy Music
- Bless the Lord O My Soul (Psalm 103), 1952, Galaxy Music
- Christ is Risen Today! (Published by Galaxy Music)
- Dear Lord and Father, R. D. Row/Carl Fischer Music
- How Lovely Are Thy Dwellings (Psalm 84: 1–3), 1952, Galaxy Music
- Raising of Lazarus (John XI: 1, 3, 4, 17, 41, 42, 43, 44, 25), 1957, Carl Fischer
- Thou Wilt Hear our Prayer, R. D. Row/Carl Fischer Music
- Treasure in Heaven, R. D. Row/Carl Fisher Music
- Trust in the Lord (Proverbs 3: 5–6), 1946, Galaxy Music

=== Secular songs for voice and piano ===
- Folk Song Settings, arrangements and English texts by Katherine K. Davis, Galaxy Music
1. The Deaf Old Woman (Missouri Folk Song), 1947
2. He's Gone Away (North Carolina Folk Song), 1947
3. The Soldier (Kentucky Folk Song), 1947
4. Bagpipes (Hungarian Folk Tune), 1949
5. The Mill Wheel (J'entends le moulin, French Canadian Folk Song), 1949
6. The Pitcher (Portuguese Folk Song), 1951
- I Have a Fawn (Thomas Moore), 1966, Galaxy Music
- Nancy Hanks (Rosemary Benét), a work about Nancy Lincoln, 1941, Galaxy Music

=== Original choral works ===
- Alleluia, come, good people, text by John Crowley, mixed voices a cappella, 1941, Galaxy Music
- The Birds' Noël (Christmas carol), mixed voices and keyboard, 1965, Galliard/Galaxy Music
- In the Bleak Midwinter, text by Christina Rossetti, SSA a cappella, 1933, E.C. Schirmer
- The Little Drummer Boy (with Harry Simeone and Henry Onorati), SA or SATB chorus and keyboard, 1958, Shawnee Press
- Our God is a Rock, mixed voices and keyboard, 1949, C.C. Birchard
- Seasonal Anthems for junior choirs (7 original works and 3 arrangements), two-part children's chorus and keyboard, 1963, B.F. Wood Music
- Shepherds, Awake!, mixed voices a cappella, 1938, Remick Music
- Sing Gloria, text by John Crowley, mixed voices, SA duet, and keyboard, 1952, Remick Music

=== Original instrumental works ===
- Hornpipe, piano solo, 1956, J. Fischer and Bros.

=== The Concord Series ===
- The Concord piano books, 4 volumes, 1925–1927, Nos. 600–602, 604
- Cinderella, a folk-tune operetta in three acts without spoken dialogue, 1933, No. 616
- Songs of freedom, for unison and part singing (with Archibald T. Davison and Frederic W. Kempf), 1942, No. 621

=== Arrangements of other composers' works ===
- Bois épais (aria from Amadis by Jean-Baptiste Lully), voice and piano, 1956, Galaxy Music
- Choruses (with Channing Lefebre) in For us a child is born (Uns ist ein Kind geboren) (Johann Kuhnau, attr. J. S. Bach), cantata for SSA voices, SA solo, and keyboard, 1951, Galaxy Music
- God is Life (Gott lebet noch by J. S. Bach), voice and piano or organ, 1955, Galaxy Music
- Sheep may safely graze (of J. S. Bach's aria), mixed voices and piano, 1942, Galliard/Galaxy Music

=== Other editions and arrangements ===
- As it fell upon a night (traditional Christmas carol), mixed voices, soprano descant, and piano, 1942, Galaxy Music
- Awake, Thou Wintry Earth (17th-century Dutch carol, text by Thomas Blackburn), 1936, E.C. Schirmer
- The Belfry book, for unison and two-part singing, 1943, Remick Music
- The Belfry book of Christmas carols, SSA a cappella, 1958, Remick Music
- The Bow Street book, folksongs and part-songs for soprano, alto, and baritone, 1951, Birchard Music
- Carol of the Drum, Czech carol, SATB chorus, 1941, B.F. Wood Music Company
- Early American anthem book, anthem tunes and verses from the Colonial period in new settings, 1975, Galaxy Music
- Four Elizabethan madrigals, for string quartet or instrumental ensemble, ed. with Hazel Weems, 1962, G. Schirmer
- The Galaxy junior chorus book, two-part folksongs, 1945, Galaxy Music
- The Green Hill, junior choir and duet book (soprano and alto), 1938, E.C. Schirmer
- The Green Hill, three-part sacred music for women's voices (S.S.A.), 1940, E.C. Schirmer
- Let all mortal flesh keep silence (French carol), SAB chorus and piano, 1941, B.F. Wood Music
- Let All Things Now Living, Welsh carol, text by John Crowley, SATB chorus with descant, 1939, E.C. Schirmer
- O God, our help in ages past (St. Anne hymn tune, text by Isaac Watts), mixed voices and keyboard, 1941, Boston Music
- Prayer of Thanksgiving (Netherlands folk song), mixed voices a cappella, 1936, E.C. Schirmer
- Sing Unto the Lord, twenty sacred solos for medium voice and piano or organ, with Nancy Loring, 1948, Carl Fisher
- Thou who wast God (hymn from the Genevan psalter), SSA and keyboard, 1960, Galaxy Music
