= Amanda Forsythe =

American singer

Amanda Forsythe (born 1976) is an American light lyric soprano who is known for her interpretations of baroque music and the works of Rossini.

== Early life and education ==
Amanda Forsythe was born in 1976 in New York City, with a sister, and grew up on Roosevelt Island and later in Lloyd Harbor, New York, where she graduated from Cold Spring Harbor High School. She entered Vassar College in 1994 where she initially studied marine biology. Forsythe graduated from Vassar in 1998 with a degree in music and went on to graduate studies in vocal performance at the New England Conservatory of Music. Forsythe was not accepted into the conservatory's opera workshop program, so the she ended up seeking performance opportunities elsewhere while continuing to study at NECM. Forsythe ended up performing in a production of Cavalli's Giasone at Harvard University. The opera introduced her to her husband, conductor Edward Elwyn Jones and Martin Pearlman, the director of Boston Baroque.

In 2003, she was the winner of the George London Foundation Awards and the second-place winner of the Liederkranz Foundation competition. Forsythe received an honorable mention in the 2005 Walter W. Naumburg Foundation Awards. She was also a vocal fellow at Tanglewood Music Center for two summers and has apprenticed at Chicago's Ravinia Festival and the Caramoor Festival. At Tanglewood, she originated the role of young Margarita in the world premiere of Osvaldo Golijov's Ainadamar and replaced Dawn Upshaw in the lead role for one performance.

== Career ==
Forsythe made her professional debut in 2001 as Proserpina/Ninfa in Monteverdi's L'Orfeo with Boston Baroque.

In the 2002–2003 season, Forsythe performed the role of Cleopatra in Handel's Giulio Cesare in Egitto with Hudson Opera Theatre. She also performed the role of Amore in Monteverdi's Il ritorno d'Ulisse in patria with Boston Baroque.

In the 2003–2004 season, Forsythe performed Bach's Wedding and Coffee Cantatas and the role of Oberto in Handel's Alcina with Boston Baroque. She also made her debut at the Caramoor Festival in two productions created by the Handel and Haydn Society. These included the role of Cendrillon in Pauline Viardot's Cendrillon, and as Un Trojano in Gluck's Paride ed Elena.

In the 2004–2005 season, Forsythe performed the role of Serpina in Pergolesi's La serva padrona with Boston Baroque.

In the 2005–2006 season, Forsythe made her debut with Opera Boston and Opera Unlimited as the Angel in Peter Eötvös's Angels in America. She also sang various roles in Boston Baroque's production of Purcell's The Fairy-Queen, including the role of the Chinese woman who sings the famous aria "Hark how the echoing air".

In the 2006–2007 season, Forsythe made her debut at the Boston Early Music Festival performing the role of Aglaure in the North American premiere of Lully's Psyché. She also recorded the role in the first recording of this opera. In addition, she sang the role of Vagaus in Boston Baroque's production of Vivaldi's oratorio Juditha triumphans. She also sang Handel's Messiah with the Charlotte Symphony and Apollo's Fire.

In the 2007–2008 season, Forsythe made her European debut singing Corinna in Rossini's Il viaggio a Reims at the Rossini Opera Festival in Pesaro. She also made her debuts at the Grand Théâtre de Genève and the Bayerische Staatsoper as Dalinda in Handel's Ariodante, and returned to Opera Boston to perform the role of Iris in Handel's Semele. She also reprised the role of Young Margarita in Osvaldo Golijov's Ainadamar with the Calgary Philharmonic.

Forsythe has also performed at the Harvard Early Music Society and with the Masterworks Chorale, the Los Angeles Philharmonic, the Rhode Island Philharmonic, the Florestan Project, the Omaha Symphony, the Hartford Symphony, the Louisiana Philharmonic, and the Boston Chamber Music Society.

In 2026, Forsythe, Robert Mealy, Paul O'Dette, and Stephen Stubbs (Boston Early Music Festival) were awarded a Grammy Award for Best Classical Solo Vocal Album for their recording, "Telemann: Ino - Opera Arias For Soprano".
