= Robert Kyr =

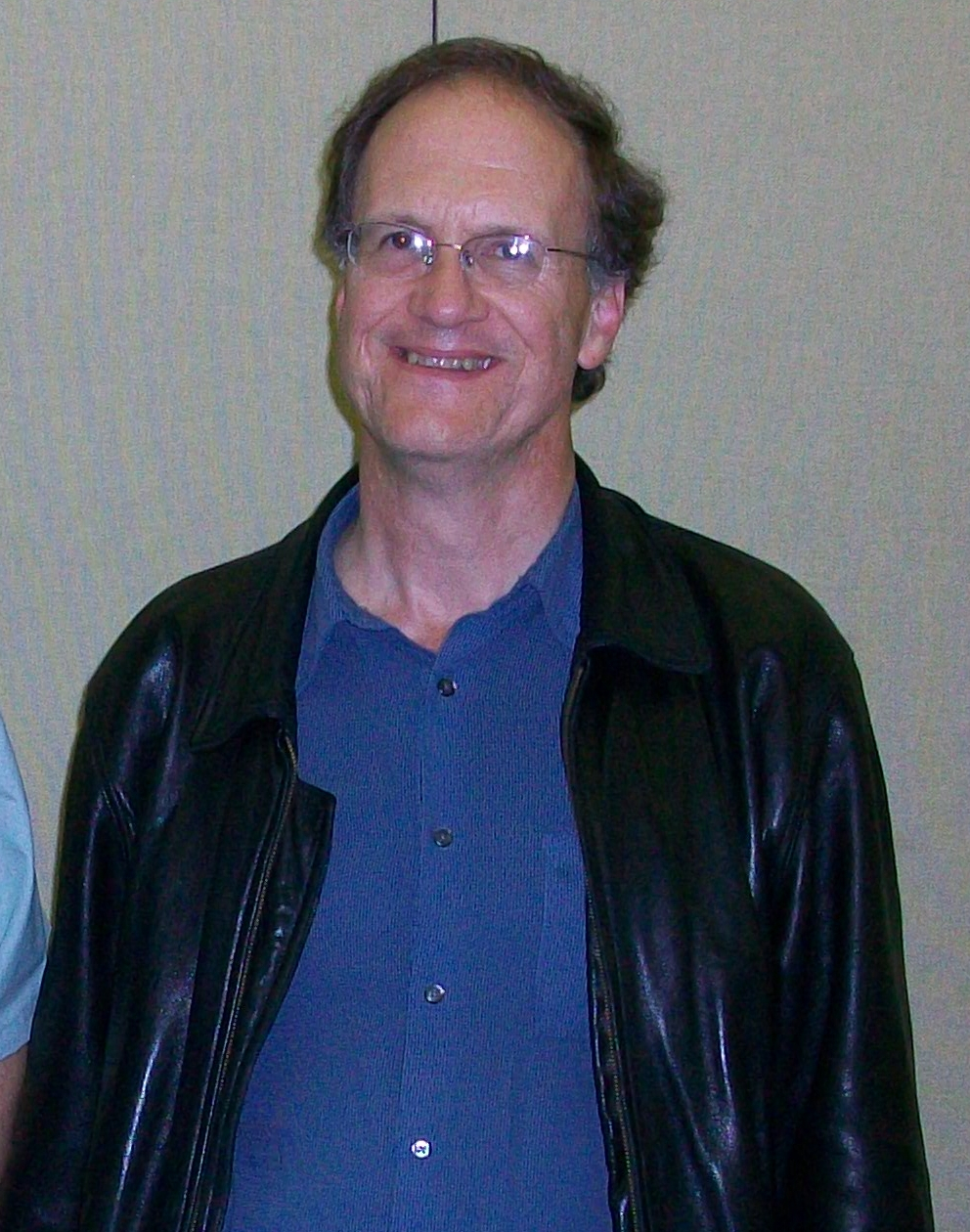
- Dr Robert Kyr

Background information
- Born: April 20, 1952 (age 74); Cleveland, Ohio
- Occupations: Composer, writer, filmmaker, and professor of music composition and theory.

Robert Harry Kyr (born April 20, 1952) is an American composer, writer, filmmaker, and Philip H. Knight Professor of Music Composition and Theory at the University of Oregon School of Music and Dance.

Kyr is one of the most prolific composers of his generation, having written 12 symphonies, three chamber symphonies, three violin concerti, numerous large works for orchestra, oratorios and other large-scale choral works, and a wide variety of chamber music.

Luminous and sometimes ecstatic in effect, Kyr's work is basically tonal, and often harmonically and rhythmically complex, its sophistication deriving from its synthesis of both modern and ancient modes, as well as Western and Asian musical traditions. An engaged activist for world peace and environmentalism, Kyr has initiated a number of projects that bring together musicians from diverse cultures, or combine music with other media, and touch upon current or historical events.

The concepts and titles of Robert Kyr's works often point to their spiritual and metaphysical dimensions: A Time For Life, In Praise of Music, On The Nature of Love (Violin Concerto No.1), Unseen Rain, Songs of The Shining Wind, Into the Hour of New Life, White Tigers, and The Passion According to Four Evangelists.

Kyr's music has been performed widely around the world and he has been commissioned by numerous ensembles, including Chanticleer (San Francisco), Cappella Romana (Portland), Cantus (Minneapolis), San Francisco Symphony Chorus, New England Philharmonic, Oregon Symphony, Yale Symphony Orchestra, Cleveland Chamber Symphony, New West Symphony (Los Angeles), Harvard-Radcliffe Collegium Musicum, Harvard Glee Club, Radcliffe Choral Society, Yale Camerata, Oregon Repertory Singers, Cappella Nova (Scotland), Revalia (Estonia), Putni (Latvia), Moscow State Chamber Choir (Russia), Ensemble Project Ars Nova, Back Bay Chorale (Boston), Notre Dame Vocale, and San Francisco Symphony Youth Orchestra among others.

Three compact discs of Kyr's music are currently available through New Albion Records: Violin Concerto Trilogy; Unseen Rain; and The Passion According to Four Evangelists. In addition, his music has been featured on several compilation discs including, Faces of a Woman, Celestial Light: Music by Hildegard von Bingen and Robert Kyr, The Fourth River: The Millennium Revealed, and Strange Attractors: New American Music for Piano.

Kyr has held teaching positions at Yale University, UCLA, the Longy School of Music and since 1990, has been Professor of Composition and Theory at the University of Oregon, which also includes David Crumb on the faculty. Kyr also directs the Oregon Bach Festival Composers Symposium, the University of Oregon Composers Forum, the Music Today Festival, and the Vanguard Concert and Workshop Series, as well as the Pacific Rim Gamelan.

Kyr received his bachelor's degree from Yale University in 1974, followed by a master's degree from the University of Pennsylvania in 1980, and a Ph.D from Harvard University in 1989, where previously, he was a Junior Fellow in the Society of Fellows. He also studied at the Royal College of Music in London, England (1974–76). His primary teachers included Donald Martino, Earl Kim, George Rochberg and George Crumb.
