= Harvardiana (song) =

March song of Harvard University

"Harvardiana" is a march song of Harvard University written by Raymond G. Williams (1887–1981) and Sanger B. Steel (1889–1927), both members of the Harvard class of 1911.

The song uses the name "Eli" to refer to athletic rival Yale. In recent years it has become the tradition for women to shout "Radcliffe!" between the repetitions of "Harvard!" in the chorus of the song.

== Tradition ==
The Harvard Glee Club (HGC), and more recently the Radcliffe Choral Society (RCS), perform "Harvardiana" as part of their annual Harvard-Yale Football Concert. This concert takes place the night before the iconic football game between the two schools and involves the performance of a series of fight songs accompanied by heckling from the other school's choir(s). HGC and RCS perform this song with choreography intended to taunt the Yale Glee Club, such as stomps and air punches. The Yale Glee Club boos and hisses from the audience.

== Lyrics ==
With Crimson in triumph flashing
'Mid the strains of victory,
Poor Eli's hopes we are dashing
Into blue obscurity.
Resistless our team sweeps goalward
With the fury of the blast;
We'll fight for the name of Harvard
'Til the last white line is passed.

Harvard! Radcliffe! Harvard! Radcliffe!
Harvard! Radcliffe! Harvard! Radcliffe!
Harvard! Radcliffe! Harvard! Radcliffe!
Harvard! Harvard! Harvard!

With Crimson in triumph flashing
'Mid the strains of victory,
Poor Eli's hopes we are dashing
Into blue obscurity.
Resistless our team sweeps goalward
With the fury of the blast;
We'll fight for the name of Harvard
'Til the last white line is passed.

== See also ==
- Fight Fiercely, Harvard
- Ten Thousand Men of Harvard
