= Holden Chapel =

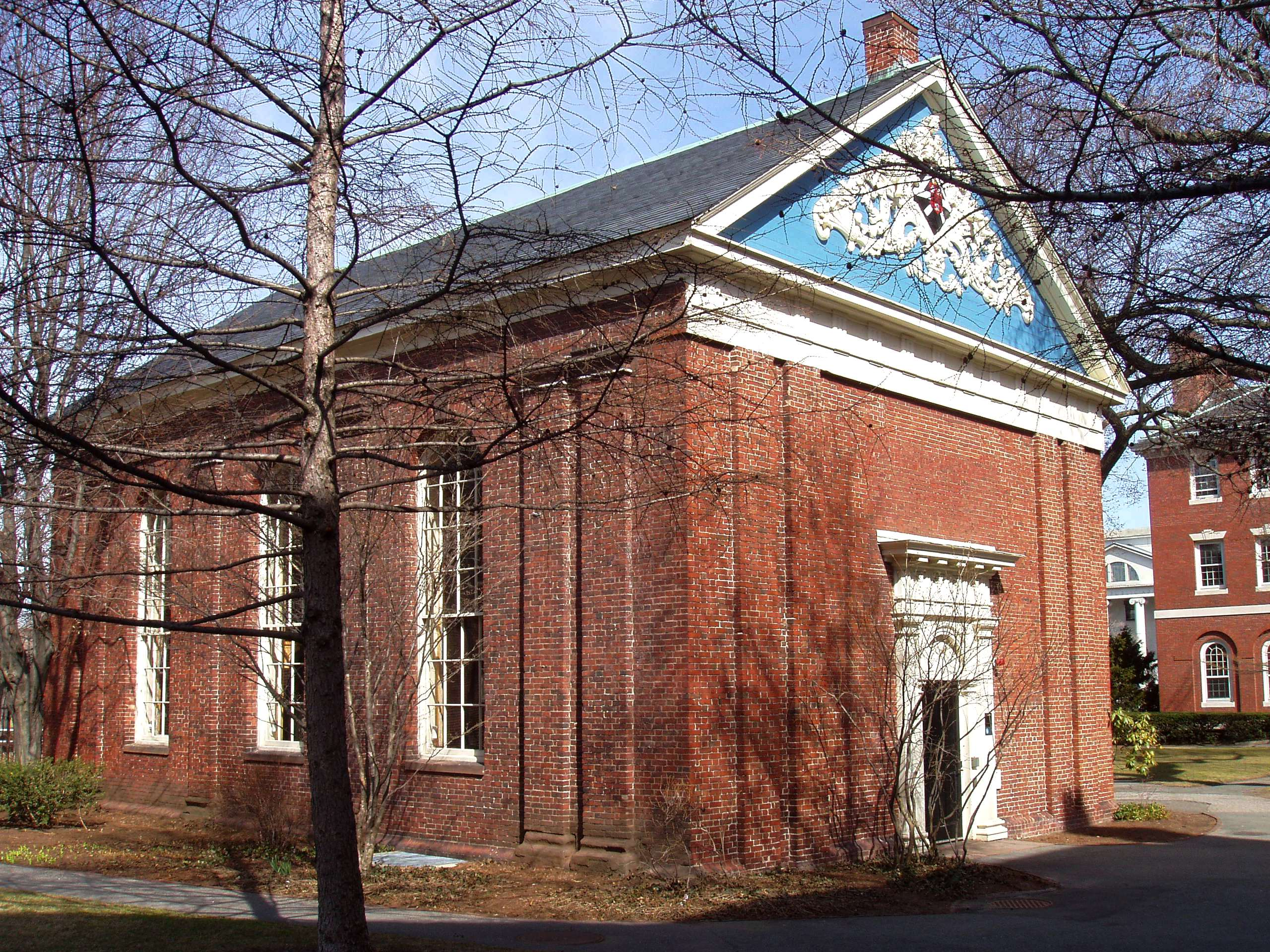
- Interactive map of Holden Chapel
- Address: Cambridge, Massachusetts, USA
- Coordinates: 42.37524°N 71.118°W
- Owner: Harvard University
- Type: Holden Choirs rehearsal space
- Event: Choral music

Construction
- Opened: 1744 (as chapel)
- Renovated: 1850, 1999

Holden Chapel is a small building in Harvard Yard on the campus of Harvard University. Completed in 1744, it is the third oldest building at Harvard and one of the oldest college buildings in America.

== Early history ==
In December 1741, Mrs. Samuel Holden, the widow of a former Governor of the Bank of England, offered Harvard a 400 pound sterling donation towards the construction of a chapel on campus, prompted by a suggestion from Thomas Hutchinson. After additional funds were raised, the chapel opened in March 1745. From 1744 to 1772 (except for 1767–68) the chapel housed morning and evening prayers for the Harvard student body, as well as providing space for some secular uses such as lectures. After the 1783 establishment of the Harvard Medical School, the building was used by its founder, John Warren, on a regular basis for 19 years, and intermittently by him and others thereafter until 1825.

It faces the Class of 1870 Gate, and a sundial inscribed "On This Moment Hangs Eternity."

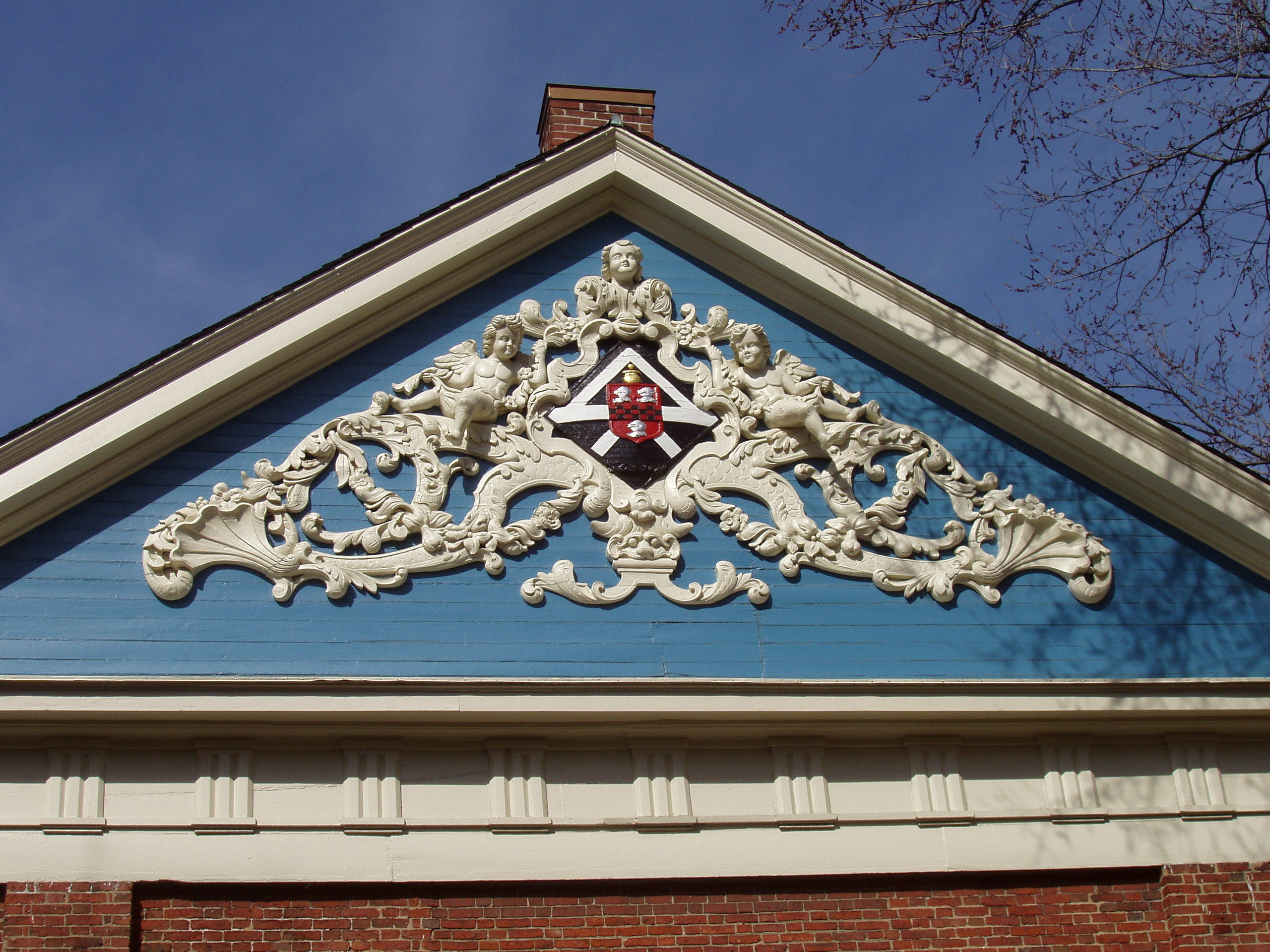
Holden Chapel detail.

== 20th/21st century ==
In the 1930s, Holden Chapel (and Hollis Hall) were chosen by the Historical American Buildings Survey Commission as two of the finest examples of early Colonial architecture in Massachusetts

For much of the 20th century, Holden Chapel housed the student offices of the Harvard Glee Club and later the Radcliffe Choral Society and the Harvard-Radcliffe Collegium Musicum, which collectively came to be known as the Holden Choirs. The chapel was remodeled in 1999 to serve as both a classroom and a musical rehearsal and performance space. Though no longer housing the Holden Choirs' offices, Holden Chapel now serves as their primary rehearsal space.
