= Joyful Noise (chorus) =

American choir for adults with disabilities

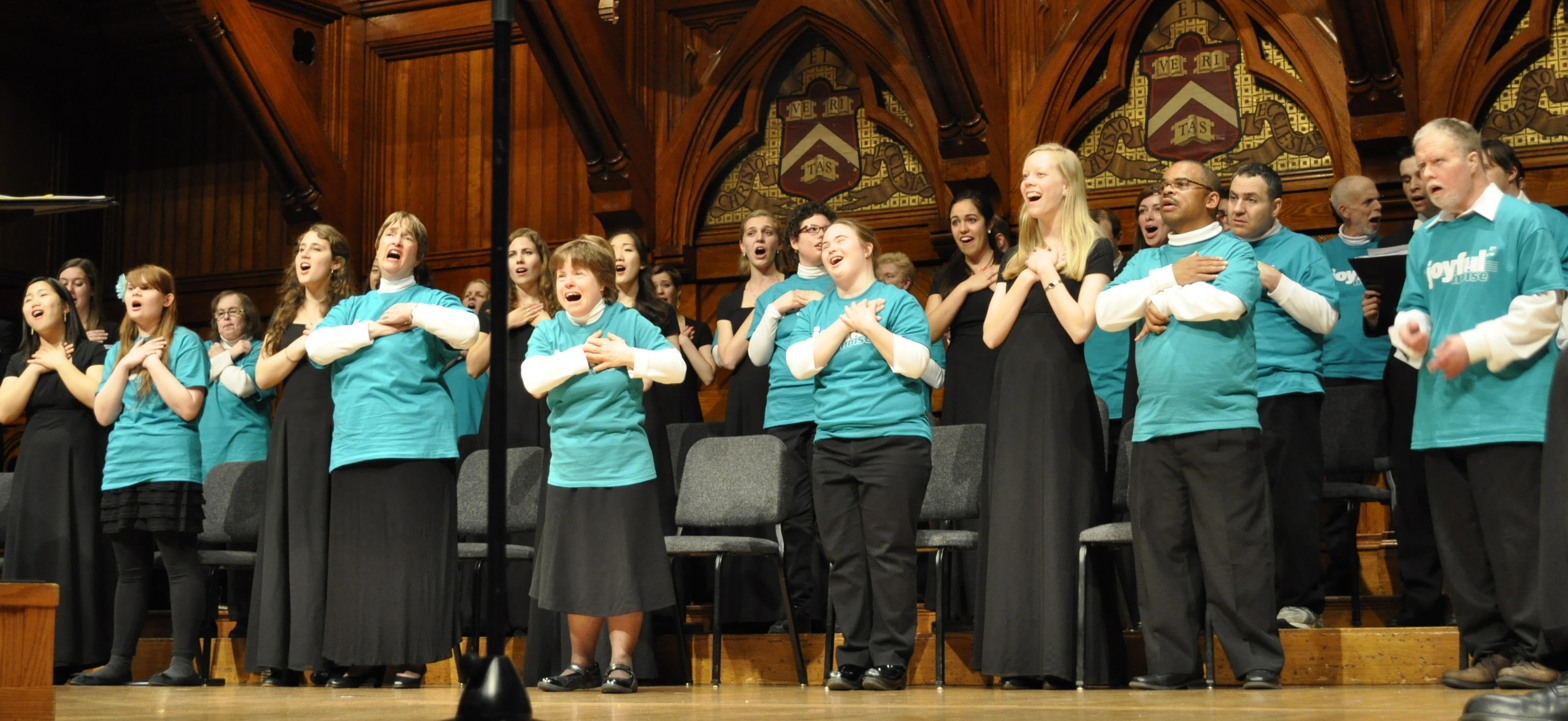
Joyful Noise performing at Harvard University - April 2014

Joyful Noise is a choir for adults with disabilities. The group consists of 50 members between the ages of 17 and 75. The members of the Joyful Noise have disabilities, ranging from physical to intellectual and acquired brain injuries. Founded in 2000 by director Allison Fromm and chorus member, Elizabeth Fromm, the ensemble is hosted by Bancroft, a support program for those with disabilities in southern New Jersey and Delaware. Joyful Noise's mission is to foster an atmosphere of community, acceptance, and teamwork in which members can discover their voices and express themselves through music. Cathy Sonnenberg and Rob Kennan serve as associate director and Delaware director.

The Joyful Noise Choral Series was established as part of the groups vision to create a new musical repertoire that would share the spirit, vocals, and musical aptitudes of Joyful Noise. To launch this series, a grant of $3,500 from the Philadelphia Eagles made possible the commissioning of new choral compositions by recognized choral composers Chester Alwes, James Bassi, Gerald Cohen, Edie Hill, Rob Kennan, Elliot Levine, J. David Moore, Nick Page, Alice Parker, Steven Sametz, and Jon Washburn. Ron Jeffers, editor of Earthsongs Publications, printed the first of these pieces for Joyful Noise's appearances at regional and national conferences of the American Choral Directors Association and Chorus America in 2008, 2009, and 2011.

As a result of Joyful Noise's performance at the American Choral Directors Association's 2011 National Conference in Chicago, conductors in several states are developing similar ensembles for singers with disabilities. In 2012, Joyful Noise performed at the Yale International Choral Festival. In April 2014, Joyful Noise had a weekend residency at Harvard University with members of the Harvard-Radcliffe Collegium Musicum. In February 2016, Tim Sharp, ACDA Executive Director noted the direct influence Joyful Noise Chorus had on the new direction the ACDA will be heading with their "Innovation-In-Action" restructuring.
