= Arthur Tillman Merritt =

American musicologist (1902–1998)

- Born: February 15, 1902; Calhoun, Missouri, US
- Died: October 25, 1998 (aged 96); Bedford, Massachusetts, US
- Education: Missouri University (BA) Harvard University (MA)
- Occupation: Musicologist

Arthur Tillman Merritt (February 15, 1902 – October 25, 1998) was an American musicologist.

== Education ==
Merritt attended Missouri University, where he received a BA in 1924 and a BFA in 1926. He received a master's of arts in music at Harvard University in 1927. Merritt studied with Nadia Boulanger and Paul Dukas in Paris.

== Career ==
From 1930 to 1932, he taught at Trinity College in Hartford, Connecticut. In 1932, he began working as a music instructor at Harvard University, then became a professor in 1943. Merritt was the chair of the music department from 1942 to 1952 and from 1968 to 1972. Starting in 1952, he served as the curator of Isham Memorial Library until his retirement in 1972.

He was described by Elliot Forbes, professor emeritus of music and colleague and close friend of Merritt, as "Never having married, his sole thrust was music, and then it developed into Harvard music, and then specifically, the development of the department."

His musicological work centered around the Renaissance and the 16th-century chanson.
