= Harvard Choruses =

The Harvard Choruses are three choral ensembles at Harvard University, consisting of the Harvard Glee Club, the Radcliffe Choral Society, and the Harvard-Radcliffe Collegium Musicum (respectively tenor/bass, soprano/alto, and mixed choruses). Often, the three Harvard Choruses combine to perform a large choral-orchestral work.

The Harvard-Radcliffe Chorus is an adjunct member, consisting of both Harvard students and members of the broader community, and serving in part as a training chorus for the other groups.

The Harvard Choruses are under the direction of Harvard's director of choral activities, Andrew Clark.

== History ==
The all-male Harvard Glee-Club, the oldest collegiate choir in America, was established in 1858 by the president of Harvard's Pierian Sodality and several of their college friends. Archibald T. Davison was the Glee Club's first conductor and he served as choirmaster there before joining the Harvard Music Department in 1910. The members, a combination of undergraduate and graduate level students, are known for singing the Harvard fight songs at university events. In 1899 the Radcliffe Choral Society was established as a treble choral ensemble. More recently came the Harvard-Radcliffe Collegium Musicum, which boasts the only SATB membership of the three groups, and focuses primarily on early-Renaissance music.

Until 2016, the Harvard Choruses were commonly known as the Holden Choruses or Holden Chapel Choirs, names derived from the choirs' original rehearsal and office space at Holden Chapel in Harvard Yard.
