= Radcliffe Choral Society =

Choral ensemble

- Choir
- Origin: Cambridge, Massachusetts, United States
- Founded: 1899; 127 years ago
- Genre: Folk, Renaissance, religious, classical
- President: Ellie Powell '25
- Chief conductor: Hana Cai
- Manager: Anika Christensen '26
- Affiliation: Harvard University
- Associated groups: Harvard Choruses
- Website: www.radcliffechoralsociety.com

The Radcliffe Choral Society (RCS) is a 60-voice treble choral ensemble at Harvard University. Founded in 1899, it is one of the country's oldest soprano-alto choruses and one of its most prominent collegiate choirs. With the tenor-bass Harvard Glee Club and the mixed-voice Harvard-Radcliffe Collegium Musicum, it is one of the Harvard Choruses. All three groups are led by Harvard Director of Choral Activities Andrew Clark. The RCS Principal Conductor is Dr. Hana Cai. RCS tours domestically every year and travels internationally every four years.

== History ==
=== Founding and development ===
The Radcliffe Choral Society was founded in 1899 by Elizabeth Cary Agassiz, the first President of Radcliffe College, and is one of the oldest women's choirs in the nation and the oldest women's organization at Radcliffe. In 1913, under the leadership of Dr. Archibald T. Davison, the Radcliffe Choral Society began a tradition of collaboration with the Harvard Glee Club and the Boston Symphony Orchestra. Through Davison's conductorship and that of his successors, the Choral Society continued to gain prominence throughout the United States as a women's choir of distinction and excellence.

Elliot Forbes, a conductor and well-known Beethoven scholar, conducted both the Radcliffe Choral Society and the Harvard Glee Club from 1958 to 1970. In 1965, the Radcliffe Choral Society and the Harvard Glee Club were nominated for a Grammy Award for "Best Choral Performance (Other than Opera)" for their recording of Mozart's Requiem in memory of Harvard graduate and U.S. President John F. Kennedy.

In the fall of 1978, Beverly Taylor became the conductor of the Radcliffe Choral Society, leading the group on four international tours to the British Isles in 1979, to Northern Europe in 1983, to Central Europe in 1987, and to Sweden, Poland, and Czechoslovakia in 1992. While abroad, the Radcliffe Choral Society won several international prizes, including Second Prize at the Dutch International Koorfest in The Hague and first prize in the Youth Division of the International Eisteddfod in Llangollen, Wales. Under her dynamic leadership, the group achieved tremendous growth and acclaim. During this time, the Radcliffe Choral Society performed frequently with the British a cappella vocal ensemble the King's Singers.

In 1995, the Radcliffe Choral Society came under the leadership of Dr. Jameson Marvin. The group's endeavors under Marvin's baton included its fifth international tour to Western Europe in the summer of 1996, performing in concerts in France, Monaco, Switzerland, and Italy. The group also performed Brahms' Ein Deutsches Requiem at Lincoln Center in New York City with the Harvard Glee Club, appeared for the fourth time at the American Choral Directors Association (ACDA) Convention, and released of a compact disc.

In 1996, Constance DeFotis joined the Radcliffe Choral Society as the associate director of choral activities at Harvard. In the spring of 1998, DeFotis led the Choral Society on tour to England. In 1999, RCS celebrated its 100th birthday with a Centennial Celebration. Among the festivities were a concert, alumnae reunion, receptions, and banquet. The year ended with the performance of Beethoven's 9th Symphony at Arts First and RCS's sixth international tour to South America.

The next five years included spring tours to Virginia, Northern California, and New Orleans and masterworks performances with the Harvard Glee Club and the Harvard Radcliffe Collegium Musicum, including Beethoven's Missa Solemnis for the celebration of Jim Marvin's 25th Anniversary and Mozart's Requiem in D for the ACDA Eastern Division Regional Conference. RCS also made history as the first choir from Harvard to tour in Africa by traveling to South Africa for three weeks during the summer of 2004. The choir gave performances in Johannesburg and Cape Town, as well as at several universities.

The 2004–2005 season began with the Festival of Women's Choruses, which took place over two days and included workshops, seminars, and three concerts. Seven high school and college women's choirs, as well as professional ensemble Tapestry, performed. Special guests included composers Hilary Tann, Caron Barnett, Libby Larsen, Patricia Van Ness, and keynote speaker Ambassador Swanee Hunt. RCS toured Atlanta and surrounding areas in March and combined with the Harvard Glee Club and the Harvard-Radcliffe Collegium Musicum for the ARTS First performance of Brahms' Ein Deutsches Requiem.

From 2005 to 2009, the Radcliffe Choral Society toured the UK, performing in Southwark Cathedral (where John Harvard was baptized), the American Northwest, Costa Rica, and the American South. It combined with the Holden Choruses to perform Handel's Messiah with the Orchestra of Emmanuel Music, Stravinsky's Symphony of Psalms, and Beethoven's Missa Solemnis. It also attended an ACDA Convention in Hartford. In October 2007, the Radcliffe Choral Society was chosen to perform at the inauguration of the Harvard's first female president, Drew Gilpin Faust. In the fall of 2009, RCS hosted a Festival of Women's Choruses, bringing together twelve children's, high school, collegiate, and adult choirs from across New England.

The 2009–2010 season was RCS's final season under the baton of Jameson Marvin. After a tour to the Northeastern United States, the group concluded their season with the world premier of Robert Kyr's Song of Awakening, commissioned for the occasion of Dr. Marvin's retirement by the Radcliffe Choral Society, the Harvard Glee Club, and the Harvard-Radcliffe Collegium Musicum and sung by all three choirs.

=== Today ===
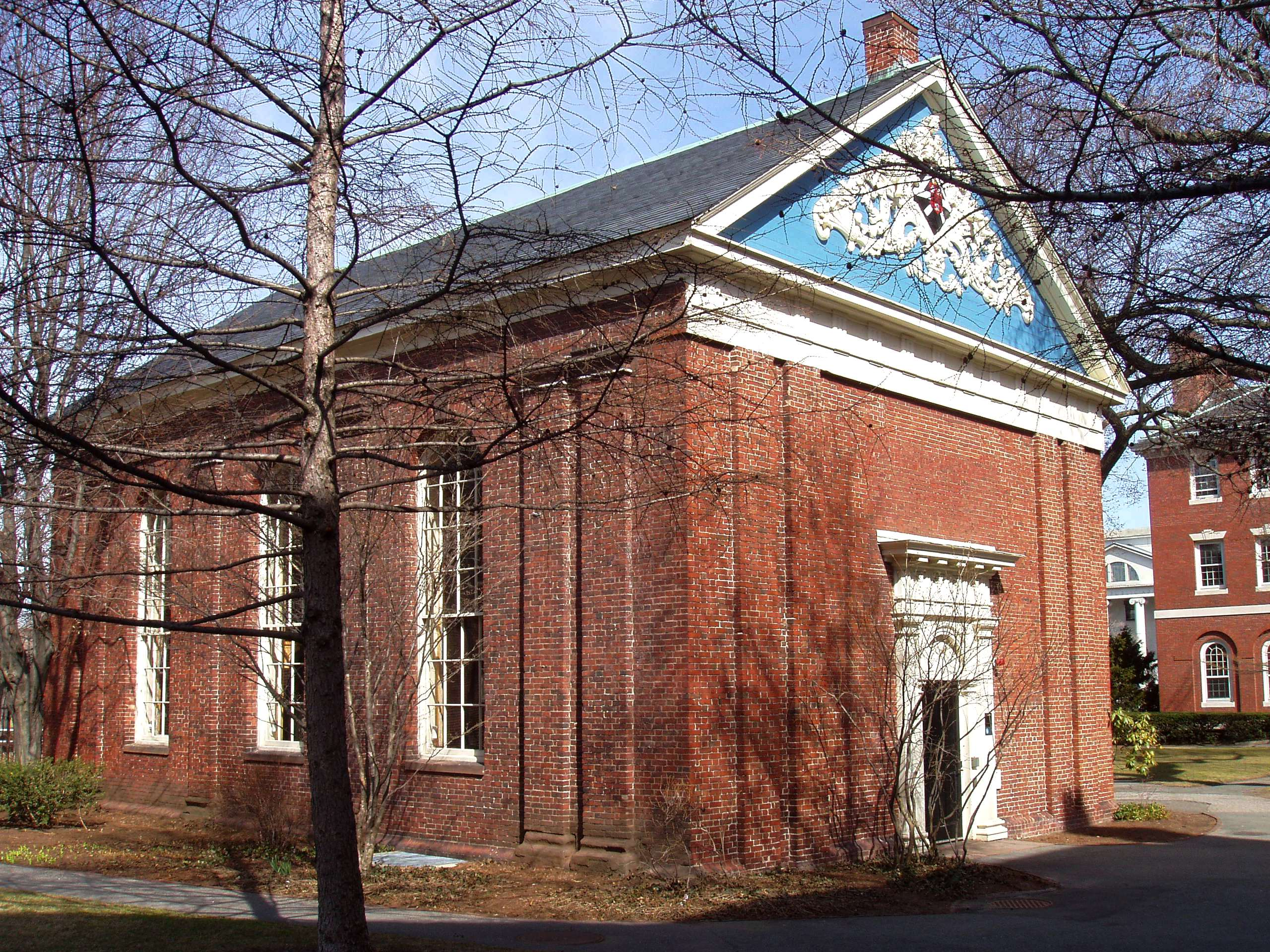
Holden Chapel

Andrew Clark became the Harvard University Director of Choral Activities in 2010. In the spring of 2011, Radcliffe Choral Society performed Ross Lee Finney's Pilgrim Psalms with the Harvard Glee Club and John Adams' On the Transmigration of Souls paired with Beethoven's Ninth Symphony with the Glee Club, Collegium-Musicum, and Harvard-Radcliffe Orchestra. It also embarked on a tour to Southern California. That fall, the Radcliffe Choral Society, with the other Holden Choruses and HRO, and accompanied by a light show, performed as part of Harvard's 375th Anniversary celebration, which featured speeches from President Faust and Dean Evelynn Hammonds and closed with a performance by Yo-Yo Ma. That winter, the RCS and HGC premiered the commissioned piece Winter (the forgottens) by Dan Locklair.

RCS rehearses in Holden Chapel, which was built in 1744 and sits in the middle of historic Harvard Yard. Most of RCS's local concerts are performed at Harvard in Sanders Theatre, which is well known for its acoustics and design. Yearly traditions include participation in the university's Convocation and Commencement ceremonies, including Baccalaureate and Senior Class Day. Annual concerts include a traditional Christmas concert with the Glee Club, fall and spring performances in Sanders Theatre, and the ARTS First celebration in May. The choir is one of the few remaining organizations to carry the Radcliffe College name, and one of two organizations on campus to perform Radcliffiana, or traditional Radcliffe College tunes, including the school's fight song and alma mater.

In the spring of 2018, the Harvard Choruses announced a change to make each of their choruses' by-laws gender-neutral. The musical nature of the Radcliffe Choral Society's traditions remained unchanged, but it now welcomes singers of all gender identities. The Choral Society emphasized its desire to preserve its legacy and history while embracing inclusivity and rejecting discrimination.

In January 2019, RCS embarked on its first joint tour with the Harvard Glee Club since 1967. The two groups performed both joint and individual concerts throughout Texas. RCS also joined the Harvard Glee Club and the Yale Glee Club in November 2019 for the 120th annual Harvard-Yale Football Concert for the first time since the concert's inception.

== Tours ==
Year	Destination
Sum. 1996	Eastern Europe
Spr. 1998	England
Spr. 1999	Toronto & Montreal
Sum. 2000	South America
Spr. 2001	Washington, D.C. & Virginia
Spr. 2002	San Francisco
Spr. 2003	New Orleans & Houston
Spr. 2004	South Africa
Spr. 2005	Georgia
Spr. 2006	London, Cambridge, & Ely
Spr. 2007	Seattle, Vancouver, & Portland
Sum. 2008	Costa Rica
Spr. 2009	Georgia & Tennessee
Spr. 2010	New York, Washington, D.C., & Philadelphia
Spr. 2011	San Diego, Santa Barbara, & Los Angeles, CA
Sum. 2012	Turkey, Bulgaria, Serbia, & Croatia
Spr. 2013	Chicago, IL; Madison, WI; & Minneapolis, MN
Spr. 2014	New Orleans, LA; Austin, & Dallas/Fort Worth, TX
Spr. 2015	Deland, Ft. Lauderdale, & Miami, FL
Sum. 2016	Indonesia: Bali, Manado, Jakarta, Bandung
Jan. 2017	Pacific Northwest: Seattle, WA & Portland, OR
Jan. 2018	Palo Alto, East Bay, & San Francisco, CA
Jan. 2019	Austin, Dallas, Houston, College Station, TX
Jan. 2020	Puerto Rico
Sum. 2023	South Korea
Jan. 2024	New Orleans, LA & Austin, Houston, College Station, TX.

== 'Cliffe Notes ==
The 'Cliffe Notes is the a cappella subset of the Radcliffe Choral Society, founded in 1991. They perform a variety of repertoire ranging from jazz to folk to pop, all arranged by members of the group. 'Cliffe Notes, also known as 'CN, performs during RCS performances in venues such as Sanders Theatre, as well as for jams, private parties, caroling, parades, benefits, and other events.
