= Harvard University Choir =

Choir in Cambridge, Massachusetts, US

The Harvard University Choir, more commonly referred to as the University Choir or simply UChoir, is Harvard University's oldest choir. It has provided choral music for the Harvard Memorial Church and its predecessor church for over 180 years, and is Harvard's only professional choir. Each year, a select group of choristers also make up the Harvard Choral Fellows, who sing at the church's daily Morning Prayers service in Appleton Chapel.

The University Choir is the only professional choir on campus. Singers are paid a significant stipend each year. The Choir is directed by Edward Elwyn Jones, the Gund University Organist and Choirmaster at Memorial Church, and David von Behren, the Assistant University Organist and Choirmaster. In fall 2009, UChoir performed in the 100th Carols Services, the oldest carols service in the country, and in that spring performed J.S. Bach's St. John's Passion.

== History of the University Choir ==
While the first mention of choral performance at Harvard comes from the eighteenth century, a formal constitution of the University Choir was not seen until 1834; the constitution makes it clear, however, that the choir had existed before this date. One of the attractions of joining the choir at the time was the lack of supervision during compulsory Morning Prayers services.

The Choir sat in the Gallery and were left alone until it was time to sing; often they would sleep or read, paying little attention to the service. After the appointment of John Knowles Paine as the first University Organist and Choirmaster in 1862, the Choir attained the status of a professional performance choir.

The annual Christmas Carol services, the longest continually running services of their kind in the country, were founded in 1910 by Archibald T. Davison, who soon invited the women of Radcliffe College to participate, a tradition maintained by Davison's successor, Professor G. Wallace Woodworth.

John R. Ferris, who served as Choirmaster from 1958 to 1990, won high praise for performances of a wide variety of sacred choral literature by incorporating women into the previously all-male University Choir.

Under the directorship of Dr. Murray Forbes Somerville between 1990 and 2003, the choir began touring and recording CDs on the Koch International, Northeastern, Naxos, Centaur, Gothic, and ASV labels and, with the Boston Camerata under Joel Cohen, for Erato Records of France.

After his leadership during the 2003–2004 academic year, during which he served as Acting University Organist and Choirmaster, Edward Elwyn Jones was appointed the seventh Gund University Organist and Choirmaster. The first year of his appointment saw a Spring concert entitled "Choral Evolution" which featured Leonard Bernstein’s Chichester Psalms, Roxanna Panufnik’s Westminster Mass, and Libby Larsen’s Missa Gaia. The tradition of new commissions for the choir has continued under Jones; with the choir has featured a new commission each year at the Carol Services and most recently premiered three new works by Carson P. Cooman, Emma Lou Diemer, and Tarik O'Regan, written to commemorate the 75th anniversary of the Memorial Church. Jones has also led the Choral Fellows on two spring tours to Montreal, Quebec and San Francisco, California, and took the Sunday Choir to Mexico City, Querétaro, and San Miguel de Allende, Mexico in the spring of 2007.

== About the Choir ==
Approximately 40 singers form the Sunday Choir, a group that performs a wide range of choral literature for the Sunday services of Memorial Church in Harvard Yard. In recognition of their commitment, all members of this group are paid. Auditions for positions in the Sunday Choir are held early in the Fall Term. The choir attracts singers who like a challenge, singing a wide variety of music at a professional standard with a weekly performance deadline. This group performs in the annual Christmas Carol services and spring concert, and collaborates with other musical groups, both on and off campus. The Sunday Choir also undertakes both international and domestic tours.

The weekly schedule of the Sunday Choir involves rehearsals from 5 to 6:30 PM on Tuesday and Thursday afternoons in addition to a rehearsal and service on Sunday mornings. Weekday rehearsals are preceded by an hour-long tea.

In addition, the Sunday Choir goes on retreat to the St. Paul’s School in New Hampshire on Columbus Day weekend each year where, among other things, they celebrate "Carols in October" and begin to learn the repertoire for the Christmas Carol services in December. The choir also presents a spring concert each year and often performs at the Harvard ARTS FIRST festival in early May.

Sixteen selected singers from this ensemble form the Choral Fellows.

== The Choral Fellows ==
The Ferris Choral Fellows (formerly known as the Choral Fellows and before that as the Morning Choir) are a group of sixteen dedicated singers drawn from the Sunday Choir who additionally perform in the daily Morning Prayers services in Appleton Chapel; this is one of Harvard’s oldest traditions. This ensemble also represents the University Choir on tour and at special events. These singers are appointed for the full academic year after extensive auditions held the previous spring and receive free voice lessons as well as a significant stipend.

The Choral Fellows program employs a select group of singers who are dependable and committed members of the University Choir. The Choral Fellows as a group are responsible for between 6 and 8 services a week and their preparation and attendance are considered a given. Their presence is intended to help the choir develop the consistency and polish that comes from singing together often.

Conceived by Dr. Murray Forbes Somerville (Gund University Organist and Choirmaster, 1990–2003) the program is designed to provide a select group of students with a performing opportunity they would not find elsewhere as well as raise the standard of musical performance within the choir.

The Choral Fellows program was made possible by a gift to the Memorial Church at Harvard University, with the support of the Reverend Professor Peter J. Gomes (1942–2011), Plummer Professor of Christian Morals and Pusey Minister in The Memorial Church.
