= Robin Godfrey =

Irish rugby union player

- Full name: Robin Patrick Godfrey
- Born: 16 September 1931 (age 95) Tilbury, Essex, England
- School: Stonyhurst College
- University: Trinity College Dublin

Rugby union career
- Position: Centre
International career
Years	Team	Apps	(Points)
1954	Ireland	2	(0)

Robin Patrick Godfrey (born 16 September 1931) is an English-born Ireland international rugby union player.

Born in Tilbury, Essex, Godfrey attended Stonyhurst College and was a member of their team which won a public schools sevens title. He was an England Schoolboys representative player. While studying at Trinity College Dublin, Godfrey would return to Lancashire during his vacations to play with the Waterloo club.

Godfrey is of Irish descent on both sides of his family and prior to his Ireland caps had represented Munster against the 1953–54 All Blacks. He was capped twice for Ireland in 1954, debuting against Scotland at Belfast.

== See also ==
- List of Ireland national rugby union players
