= Boston Cecilia =

Choral society in Boston, Massachusetts, US

The Boston Cecilia is a choral society in Boston, Massachusetts. Founded in 1876, the ensemble has enjoyed historic relationships with the Boston Symphony Orchestra and famous conductors and composers, such as Arthur Fiedler, Igor Stravinsky, and Antonín Dvořák. Today, the ensemble is noted for its historical-style performances, and specializes in the oratorios of George Frideric Handel as well as premieres by prominent Boston composers.

After 44 years, Donald Teeters retired as music director following the 2011–2012 season. The 2012–2013 season had performances conducted by guest conductors Dan Perkins, Amy Lieberman, and Nicholas White. In April 2013, Nicholas White was announced as the new artistic director.

In January 2017, Nicholas White announced his decision to step down as artistic director. George Case led the group from 2017 to 2020. As of 2020, the music director is Michael Barrett.

In addition to its local performances, Cecilia has recorded two albums for the Newport Classic label, and one album for the label Naxos.
