= Archibald Thompson Davison =

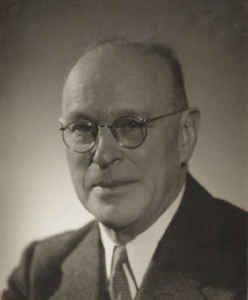
Archibald Thompson Davidson in 1954

Archibald Thompson Davison (11 October 1883 – 6 February 1961) was an American musicologist, conductor, composer and music educator. He is best remembered as an academic for his work as editor of the two volumes of 'The Historical Anthology of Music', done together with Willi Apel.

== Early life ==
Davison was born in Boston, Massachusetts. He completed his studies in music at Harvard University, finally graduating in 1908 with a PhD.

== Career ==
Davison was the first faculty conductor of the Harvard Glee Club, which under his direction from 1912 to 1933 came to be regarded as the best amateur chorus in the U.S. Davison (known as "Doc") transformed the Glee Club from a small, informal, and rowdy group that performed popular tunes to a more serious group, which toured the U.S. performing a more serious repertory:

By the end of the ‘teens, HGC was singing sacred and secular pieces from the renaissance times till the present, folk songs from around the world, and college songs and had ceased its relationships with the mandolin clubs and popular music.

The Glee Club would go on to introduce modern French works scored for men's chorus, especially those of Poulenc and Milhaud to their repertories and to audiences around the United States. The group would tour the United States and, along with the Radcliffe Choral Society began performing regularly with the Boston Symphony Orchestra, an association that would continue into the 1970s.

Davison's goals in directing the Glee Club were both artistic and educational: under his direction, the Glee Club grew much larger, in order to introduce more students to the music and to the practice of performance. Some (including The New York Times) criticized the resulting performance style, but it was a direct result of the Glee Club's dual purpose, which remains to this day. As a result, the Harvard Glee Club went on to become a premier training ground for conductors, directors and other music professionals.

Davison also composed his own music early in life, but none of his original compositions are part of the standard repertoire. His arrangements have been more widely performed, including an arrangement of Webbe's Glorious Apollo, performed regularly by the HGC.

== Death ==
He died in Brant Rock.

== Musicology ==
His musicology writings include:

- The Harmonic Contributions of Claude Debussy, 1908
- Choral Conducting, 1940
- The Technique of Choral Composition, 1945
- The Historical Anthology of Music Volume I: Oriental, Medieval and Renaissance Music, 1949
- The Historical Anthology of Music Volume II: Baroque, Rococo and Pre-Classical Music, 1950
