= Memorial Church of Harvard University =

Church building in Massachusetts, U.S.

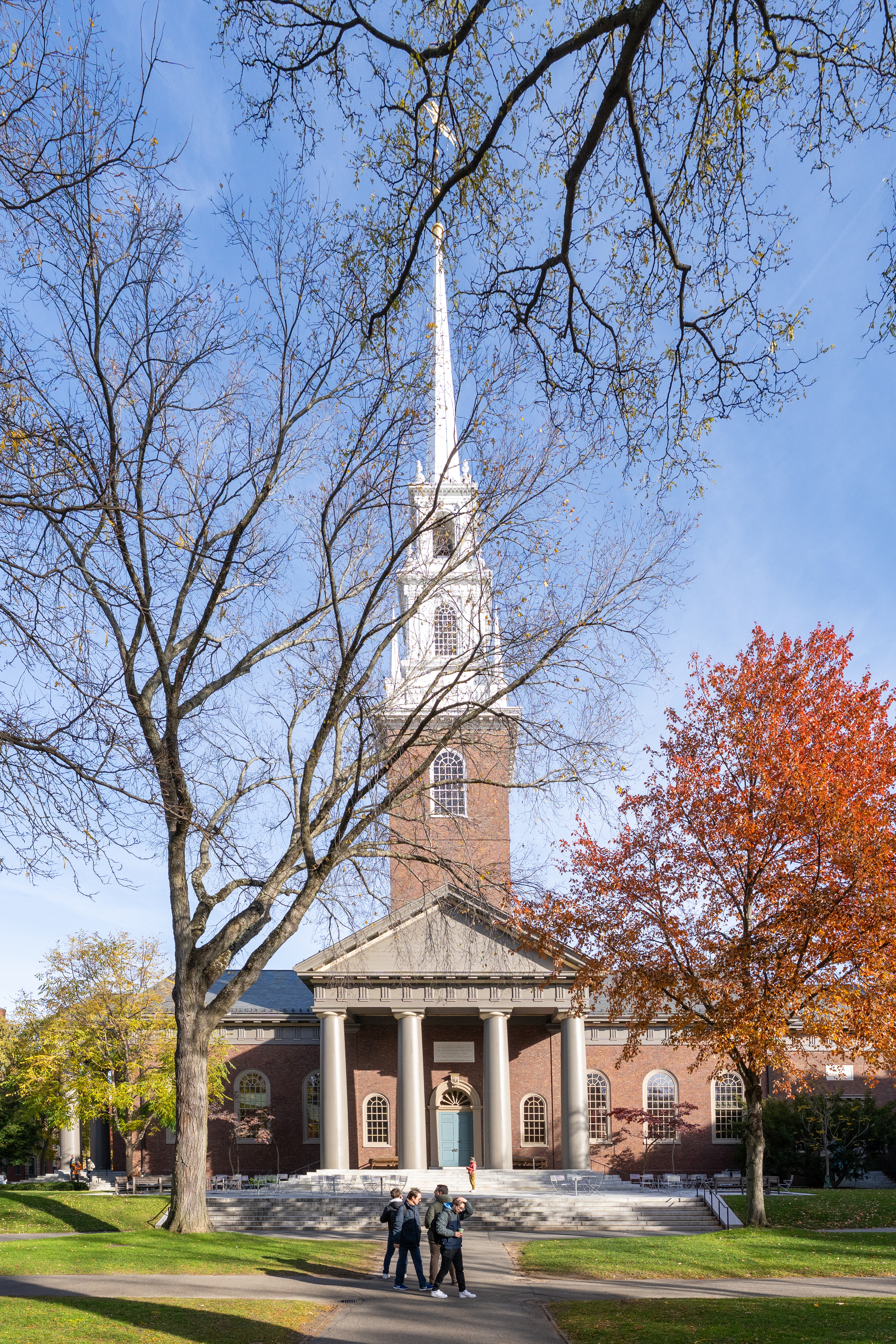
- Memorial Church of Harvard University in November 2025
- Memorial Church of Harvard University
- 42.3749°N 71.1161°W
- Location: Harvard Yard
- Address: Harvard University; Cambridge, Massachusetts, U.S.
- Denomination: Inter-denominational Protestant
- Website: Official website

History
- Dedicated: November 11, 1932 (Armistice Day)

Architecture
- Architect: Coolidge, Shepley, Bulfinch & Abbott
- Completed: 1932

The Memorial Church of Harvard University is a building on the campus of Harvard University. It is an interdenominational Protestant church.

== History ==
=== 18th century ===
The first distinct building for worship at Harvard University was Holden Chapel, built in 1744. The college soon outgrew the building, which was replaced by a chapel inside Harvard Hall in 1766, then a chapel in University Hall in 1814, and finally by Appleton Chapel, a building dedicated solely to worship sited where Memorial Church now stands.

Standing for 73 years before the current building, Appleton Chapel was home to religious life at Harvard until 1932. Its namesake is preserved inside Memorial Church, as the Appleton Chapel portion of the main building houses the daily service of Morning Prayer. When Appleton Chapel was built in 1858 thanks to the generosity of Samuel Appleton, Morning Prayer attendance was compulsory. When attendance became voluntary in 1886, the college was left with a building that had become too large for the morning prayer services and too small for the Sunday services.

=== 20th century ===
Following World War I, Harvard University President Abbott Lawrence Lowell (1909–1933) combined the idea of a war memorial with the need for a new chapel. Appleton Chapel was torn down after the 1931 Commencement. The University Architects Coolidge, Shepley, Bulfinch & Abbott, were enlisted to design the new building, and they planned a structure that would complement the imposing edifice of Widener Library. This created an open area known as the Tercentenary Theatre, where Commencement Exercises are held.

The current Memorial Church was built in 1932 in honor of the men and women of Harvard University who died in World War I. The names of 373 alumni were engraved within alongside a sculpture named The Sacrifice by Malvina Hoffman. It was dedicated on Armistice Day on November 11, 1932. The knight's face in The Sacrifice was modelled on the British World War I flying ace, Ian Henderson.

Since then, other memorials have been established within the building commemorating those Harvardians who later died in World War II, the Korean War, and the Vietnam War. For seventy-five years, it has stood in Harvard Yard opposite Widener Library as a physical reminder of Harvard's spiritual heritage. Since its inception, the Harvard Memorial Church has had weekly choral music provided at its Sunday services by the Harvard University Choir, which is composed of both graduate and undergraduate students in the university.

== John Taylor Bell ==
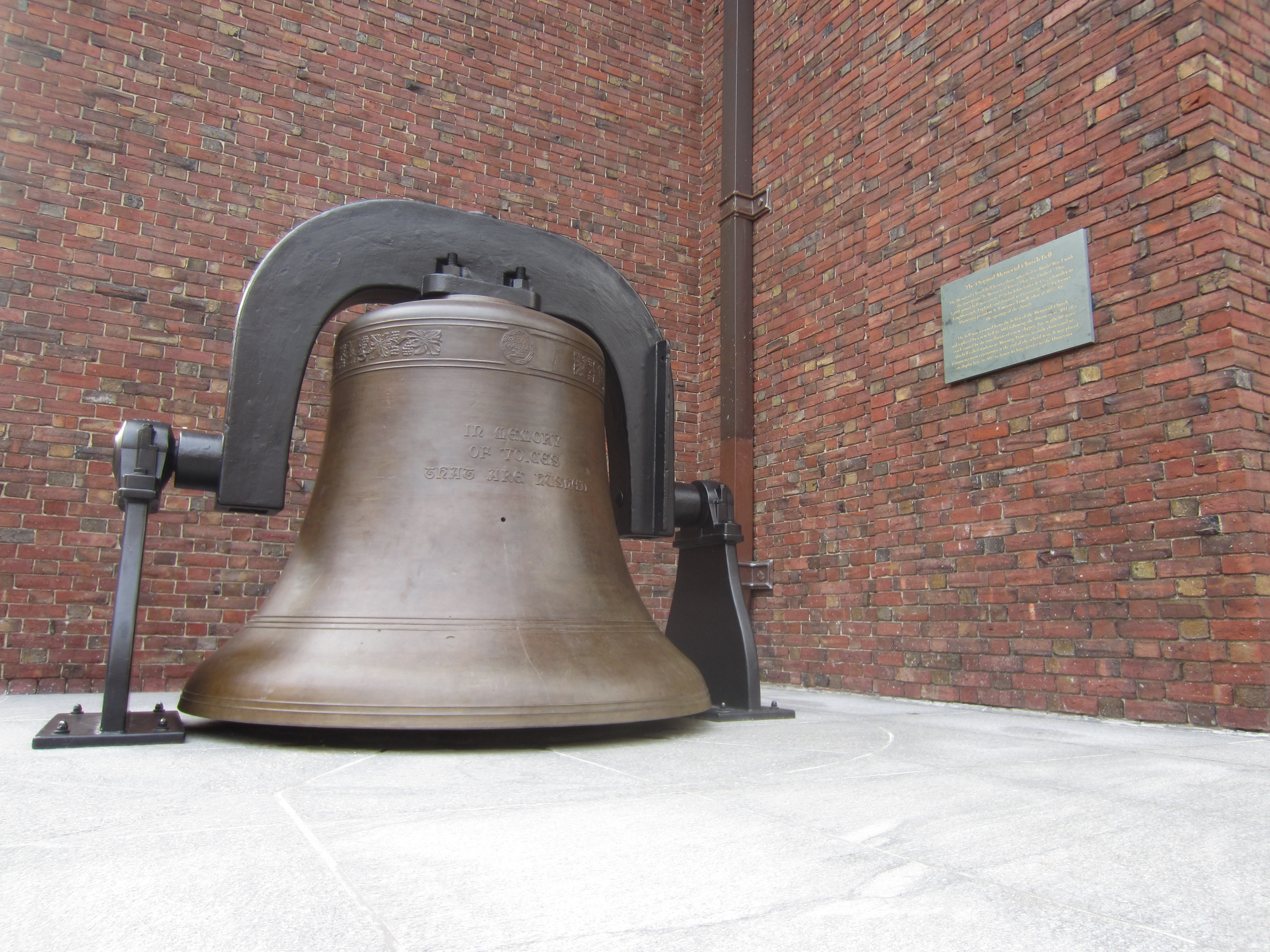
The Church bell

A 7,000 pounds (3,200 kg) bell cast in 1926 by the John Taylor & Co foundry in London was used to call students to classes and to morning prayers each morning. The bell, inscribed "In memory of the voices that are hushed," honors students who died in World War I. The bell cracked in 2011, and university officials determined that it could not be repaired. However, in 2017 a restoration was successfully completed, and the bell was placed on display on the west portico of the Memorial Church.

== Gallery ==
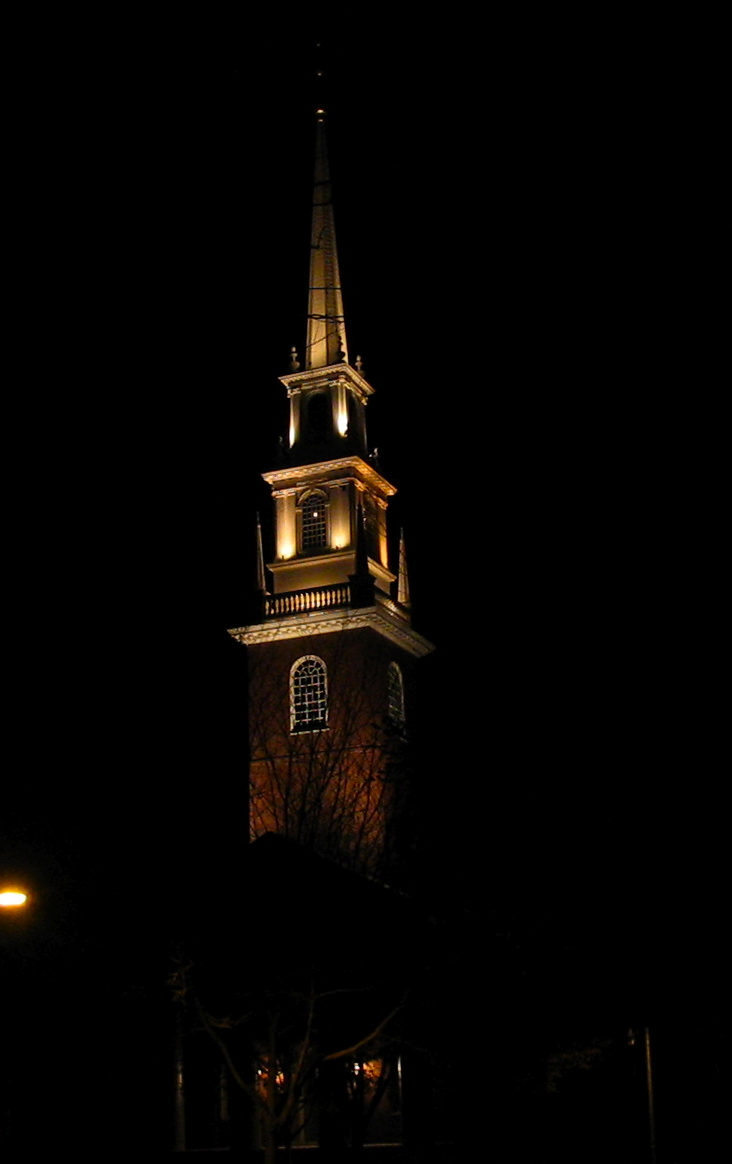

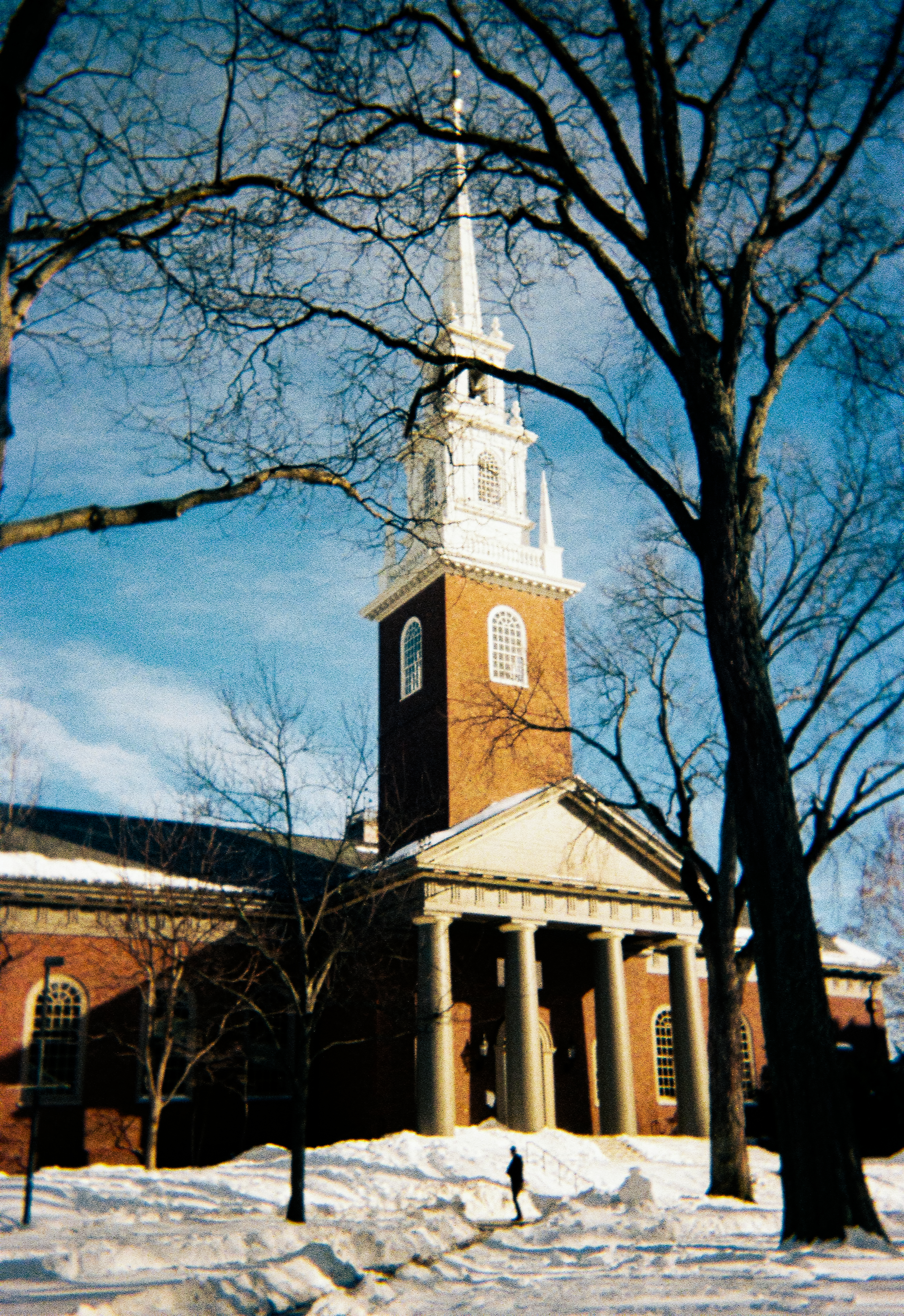
Memorial Church via Harvard Yard, February 2026

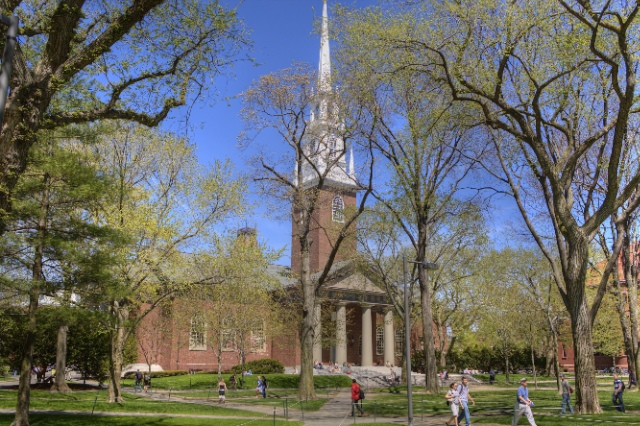
Bustling Harvard Yard

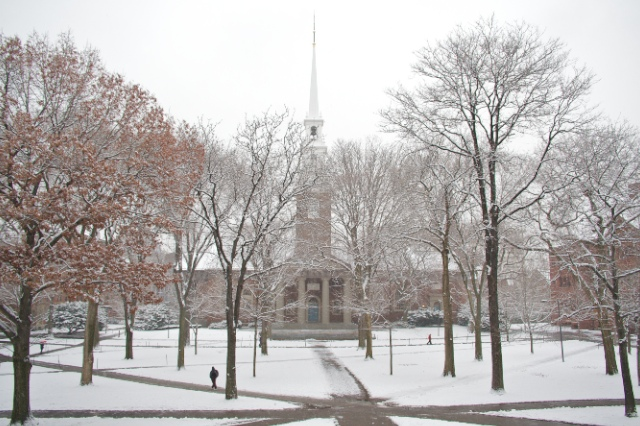
Winter time

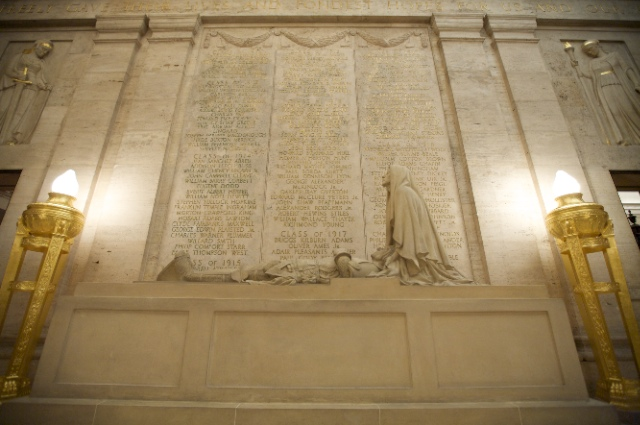
World War I Memorial

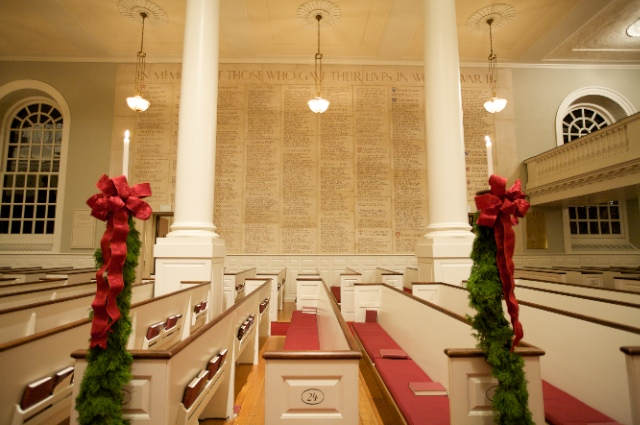
World War II Memorial

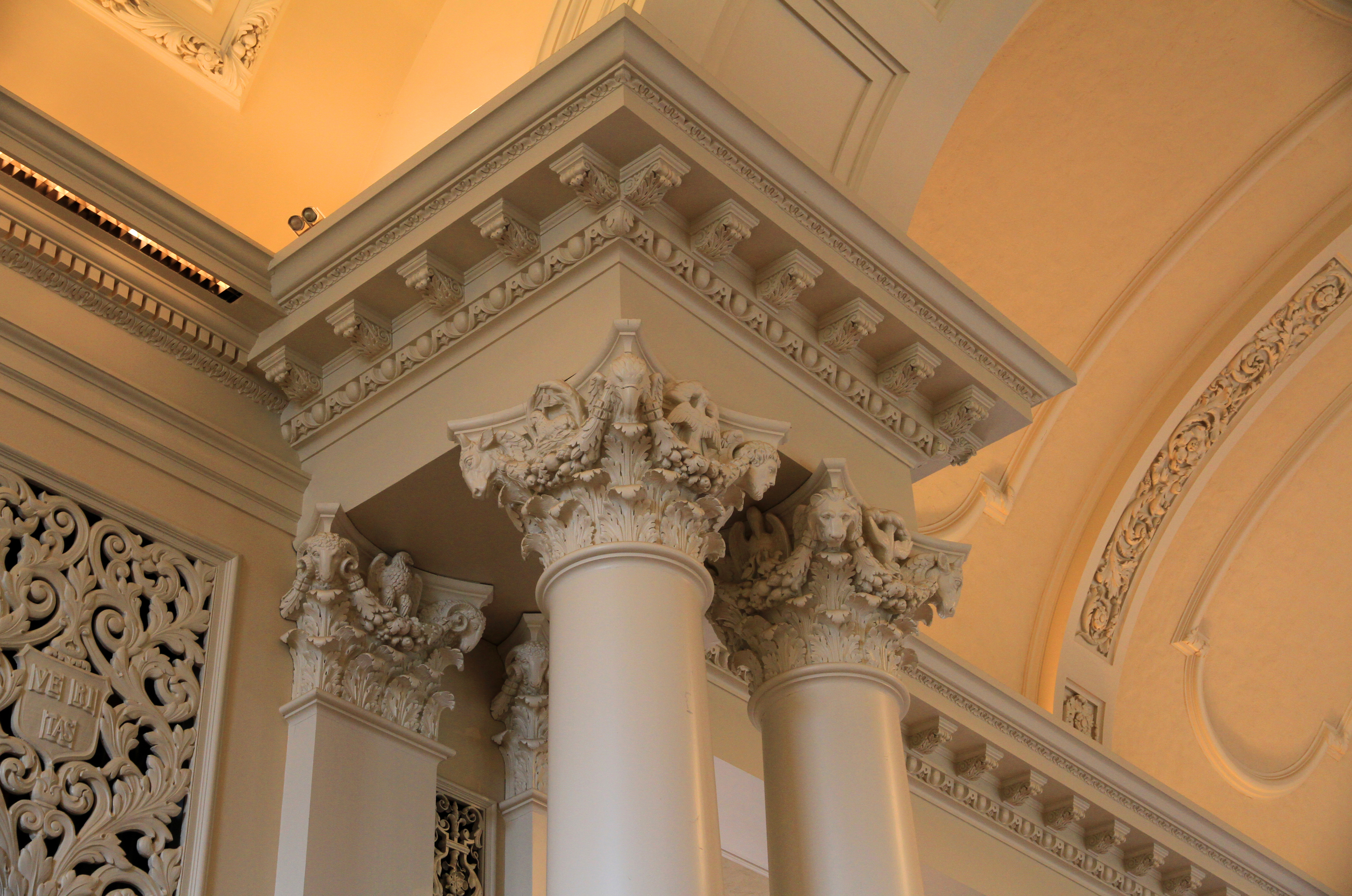

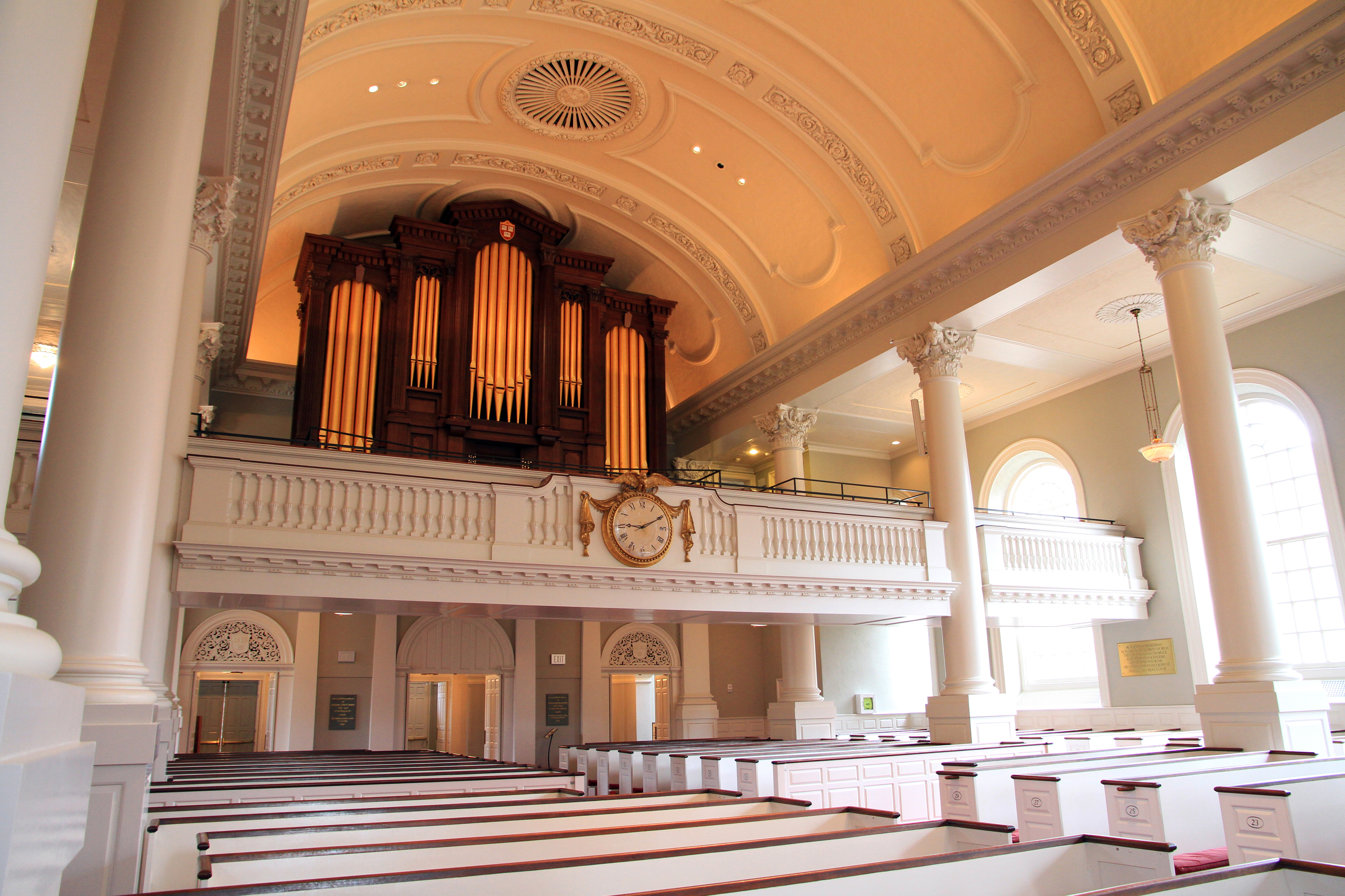

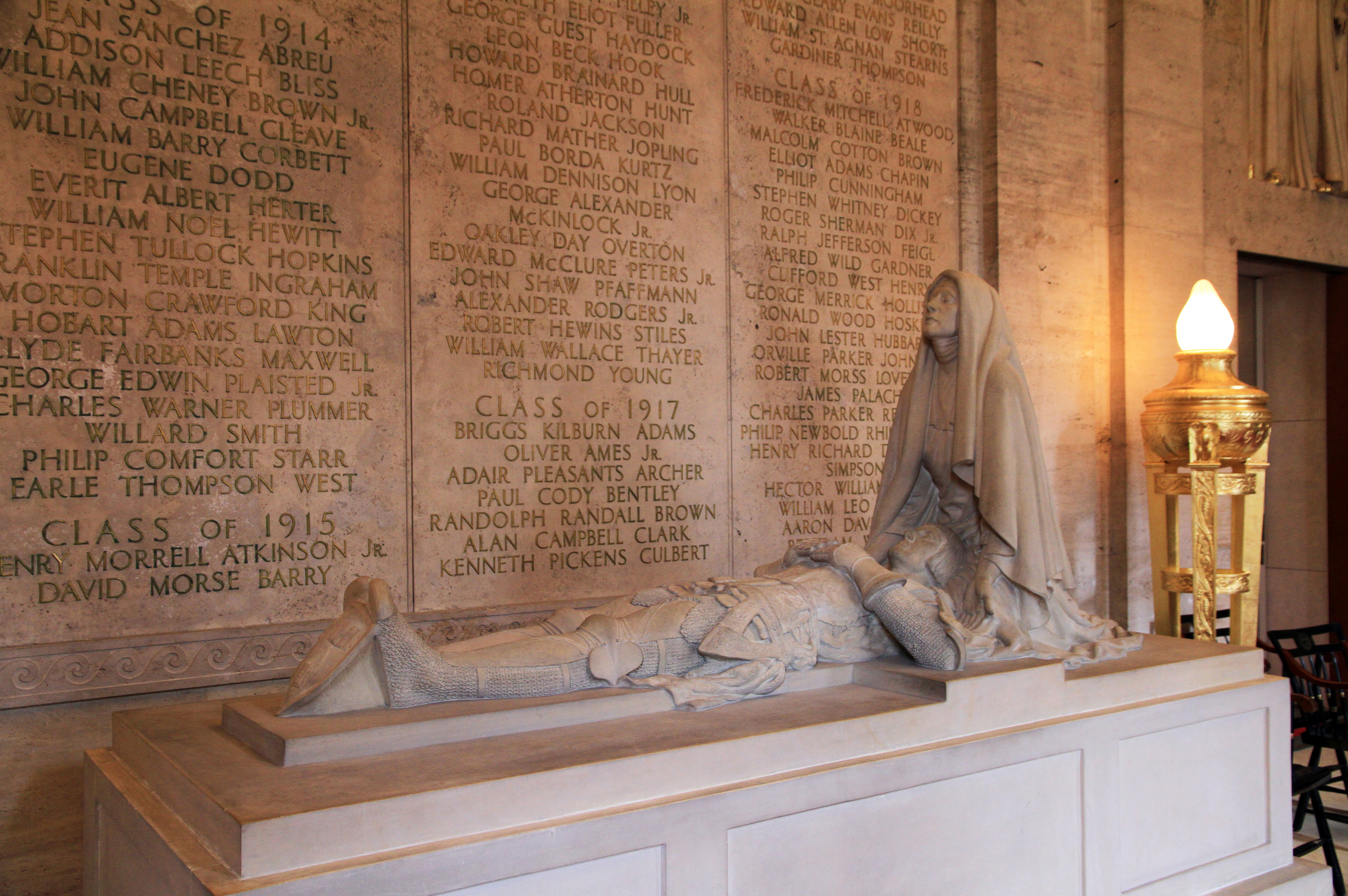

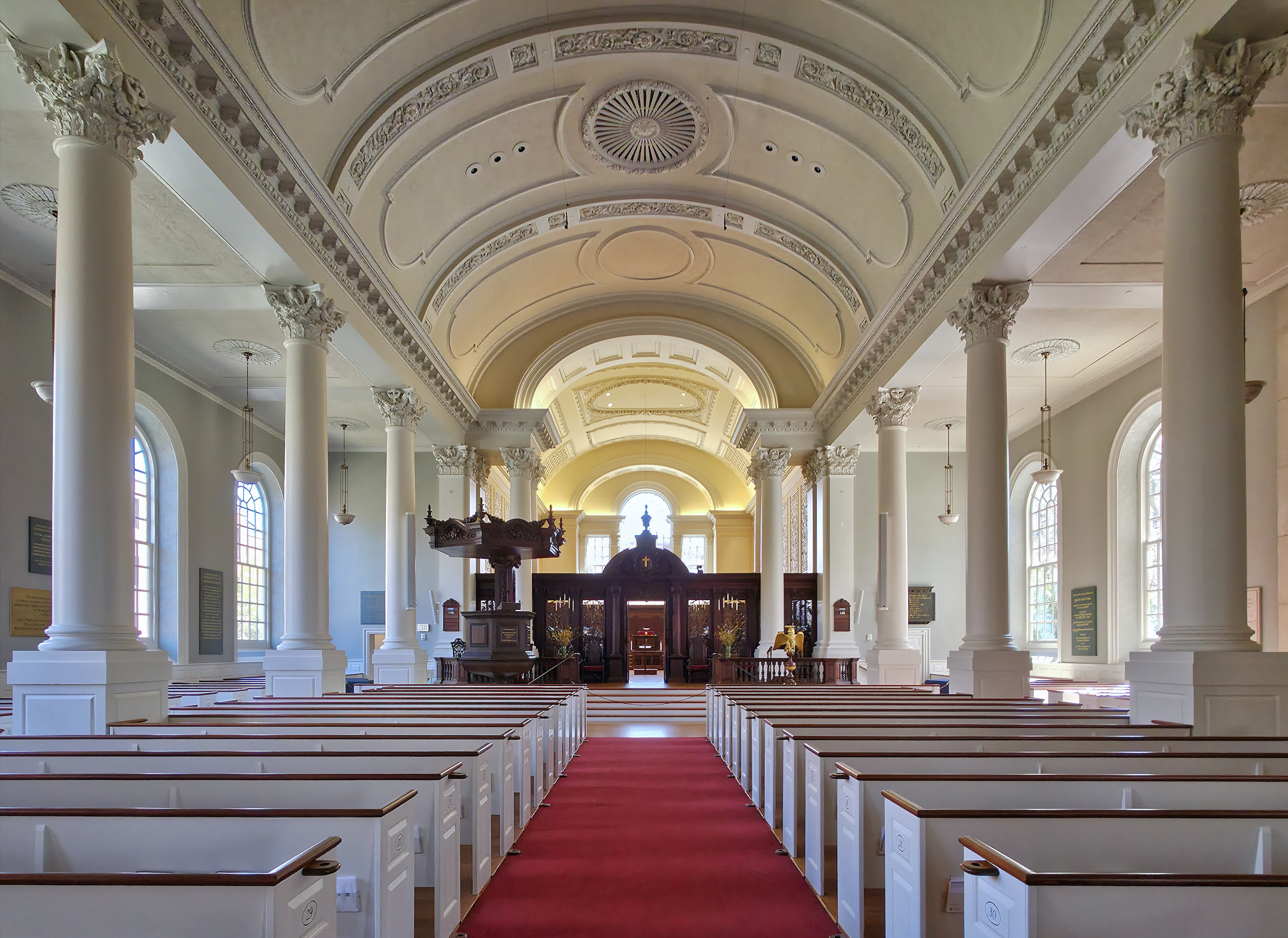

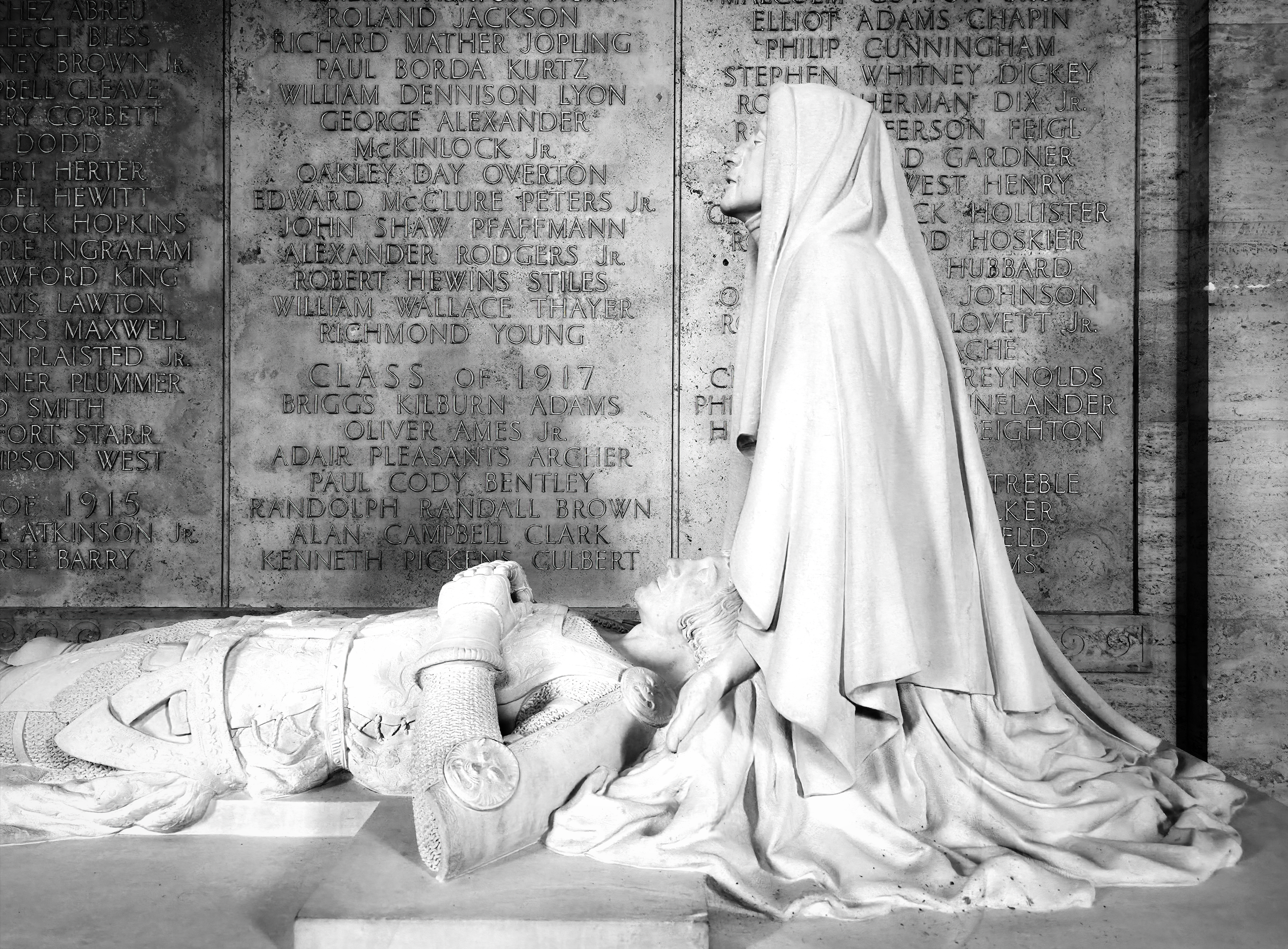
