= Harvard Glee Club =

Choral ensemble

- Choir
- Origin: Cambridge, Massachusetts, United States
- Founded: 1858; 168 years ago
- President: Preston McNulty Socha '28
- Music director: Andrew Gregory Clark
- Rehearsal space: Holden Chapel
- Concert hall: Sanders Theatre
- Affiliation: Harvard University
- Associated groups: Harvard Choruses
- Website: harvardgleeclub.org

The Harvard Glee Club (Glee Club or HGC) is a 60-voice, tenor-bass choral ensemble at Harvard University. Founded in 1858 in the tradition of English and American glee clubs, it is the oldest collegiate chorus in the United States. The glee club is part of the Harvard Choruses of Harvard University, which also include the treble voice Radcliffe Choral Society and the mixed-voice Harvard-Radcliffe Collegium Musicum. All three groups are led by Harvard's current director of choral activities Andrew Clark.

The glee club has long been a fixture of the Boston music scene, performing frequently with the Boston Symphony Orchestra and other ensembles, but this local prominence has lessened in recent years. However, thanks to over 80 annual tours to different regions of the United States and appearances at the Kennedy Center Honors and in Leonard Bernstein's popular series The Unanswered Question, the glee club has garnered national recognition; tours around the world have brought the group further attention. A number of notable people were members of the glee club during their time at Harvard, and numerous major composers of the 20th and 21st centuries have dedicated works to the group.

== History ==
=== Founding and development ===
The glee club was founded in 1858 by a group of students to sing glees and part-songs. The group remained small until the end of the nineteenth century, when growth in its size and on-campus profile made higher musical aspirations possible. In 1919, it invited Archibald T. "Doc" Davison, the choirmaster of Harvard's Memorial Church, to become glee club conductor. In 1921, the glee club embarked on its first European tour, which, though not the first such tour by a college group, was the most extensive to that point. The group was officially invited by the government of France, and the tour was covered by the press in the US and Europe. This tour also resulted in a spate of new work written expressly for the Glee Club by such composers as Darius Milhaud, Francis Poulenc, and Gustav Holst.

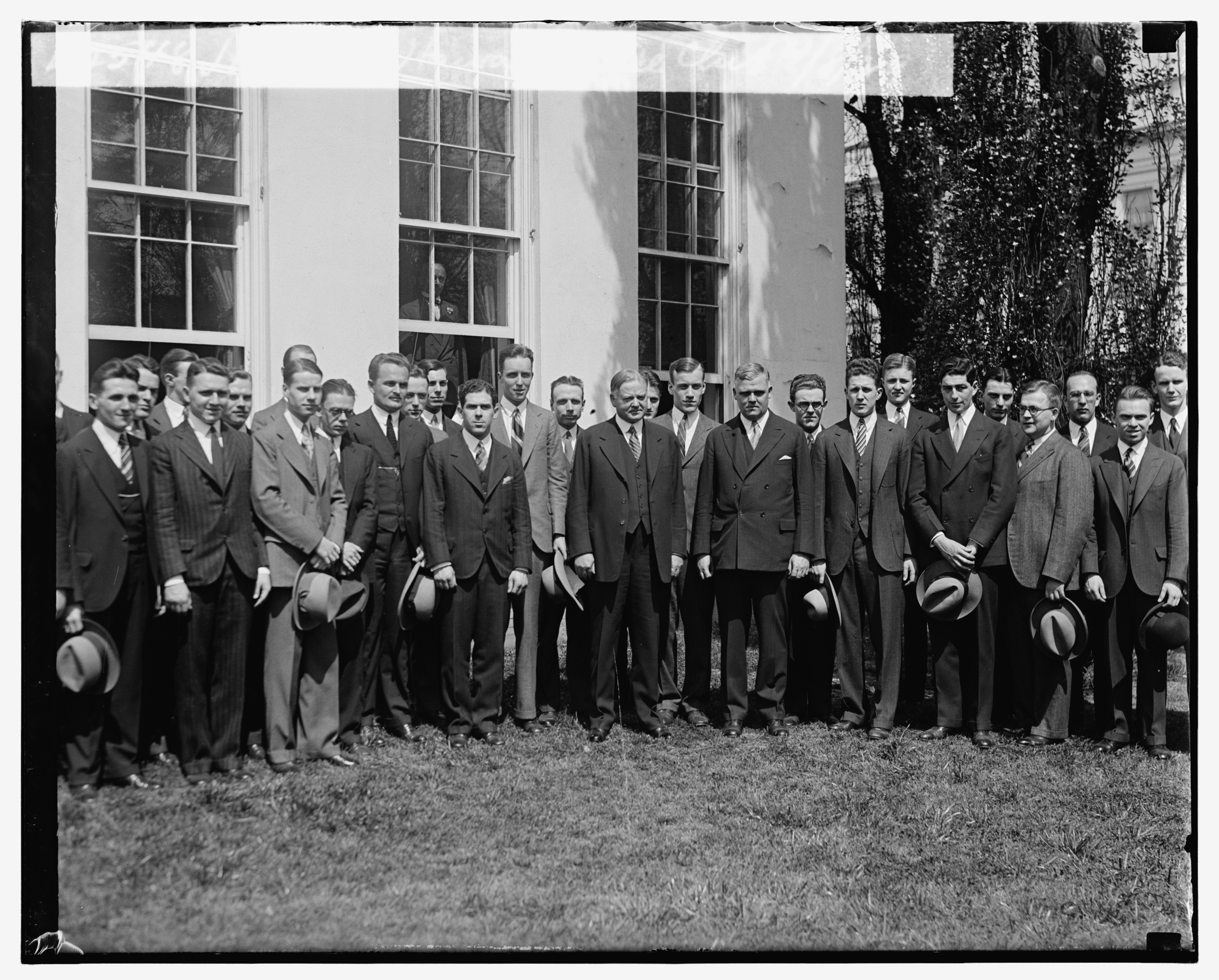
President Herbert Hoover with Harvard Glee Club on April 8, 1929

Under Davison, the glee club and the Radcliffe Choral Society became the choruses of choice for the Boston Symphony Orchestra and frequently recorded with them. Their recording of La Damnation de Faust won a Grand Prix du Disc, and a recording of the Mozart Requiem in memory of former U.S. President and Harvard graduate John F. Kennedy received a nomination for a Grammy. The relationship with the BSO continued until the creation of the Tanglewood Festival Chorus; both the club and society continue to sing with the BSO on occasion.

Since the retirement of Doc Davison, the glee club has had only five conductors: G. Wallace "Woody" Woodworth, who led the group from 1933 to 1958; noted Beethoven scholar Elliot Forbes, from 1958 to 1970, who led the group on an extensive tour around the world in 1961; F. John Adams, 1970–1978; Jameson N. Marvin, 1978–2010; and Andrew G. Clark through the present.

Under the leadership of Jameson Marvin as conductor of the glee club, the group continued to tour extensively, and was invited to a number of conventions of the American Choral Directors Association, invitations that were extended only through a blind audition process. The glee club appeared at regional conventions in Pittsburgh in 2002 and Boston in 2004 and at a national convention in Los Angeles in 2005. Concerts led by Marvin were favorably received across the country and around the world.

== Notable alumni ==
Many Glee Club members and assistant conductors have gone on to become leaders of American music, including composers, choral directors, and orchestra managers across the country. Alumni of the glee club notable for careers in music include:

- Virgil Thomson, who was assistant conductor on the 1921 European tour
- Elliott Carter, who remarked, "I owe my knowledge of music to the Harvard Glee Club"
- William Christie, also briefly the group's accompanist
- Leonard Bernstein
- Irving Fine
- John Gurney, bass-baritone with the Metropolitan Opera
- John Harbison
- Hugh Wolff
- William Martin, operatic tenor
- Scott Tucker, current director of the Washington Choral Arts Society.
- Isaiah Jackson, director of Pro Arte Chamber Orchestra
- Noel Jan Tyl, opera singer and former business manager of Houston Grand Opera

In addition, a number of Harvard Glee Club alumni have gone on to distinguished careers in other areas. They include:

- Theodore Roosevelt, twenty-sixth President of the United States
- Franklin Delano Roosevelt, thirty-second President of the United States
- Harry Blackmun, former Supreme Court Justice and author of the majority opinion in Roe v. Wade
- Jack Reed, author of Ten Days that Shook the World, who was also President of the Harvard Glee Club
- Jeff Bingaman Jr., former U.S. senator from New Mexico
- G. C. Waldrep, American poet
- Noam Elkies, mathematician
- Patrick Harlan, television personality in Japan

== Modern era ==
The Harvard Glee Club is faculty-directed but entirely student-managed. Each tour and major project, such as a large concert or production and release of a recording, has its own student manager. As such, the students themselves are in charge of selecting concert venues, managing a six-figure yearly budget, and taking care of virtually every facet of the group.

The glee club rehearses primarily in Holden Chapel in Harvard Yard. Built in 1744, Holden is one of the oldest college buildings in America. The group performs most of its "home" concerts in Harvard's Sanders Theatre, which is renowned for its excellent acoustics. Each year, major concerts include the Harvard–Princeton and Harvard–Yale Football Concerts, joint concerts that have taken place the night before these football games for more than a century; frequent concerts also include ones with the Radcliffe Choral Society at Christmas and with all of the Harvard Choruses during Harvard's Arts First celebration in May. The glee club tours annually at no cost to its students over school breaks; recent tours have taken the group to New York City (2025), the Dominican Republic (2023), Florida (2022), and Texas (2019). The glee club also takes longer, several-week tours roughly every 4 years. Recent major tours have included trips to East Asia (1993), Australia (1998), Scandinavia (2002), Central Europe (2005), and Western Europe (2023–4).

The 2007–2008 season marked the 150th anniversary of the glee club's founding. Highlights included a week-long tour of the Eastern Seaboard and a three-day festival in Cambridge from April 11–13, 2008. Nearly four hundred alumni of the glee club attended the April festivities, which included the world premiere of Dominick Argento's "Apollo in Cambridge: A Harvard Triptych," a performance of Igor Stravinsky's Symphony of Psalms with the combined Holden Choruses and orchestra, seminars on a variety of musical, academic, and historical topics, and a well-attended Sesquicentennial Banquet. The anniversary celebration continued into the summer of 2008 with a cross-country concert tour culminating in appearances at Walt Disney Concert Hall and the Ravinia Festival.

== Musical tradition ==
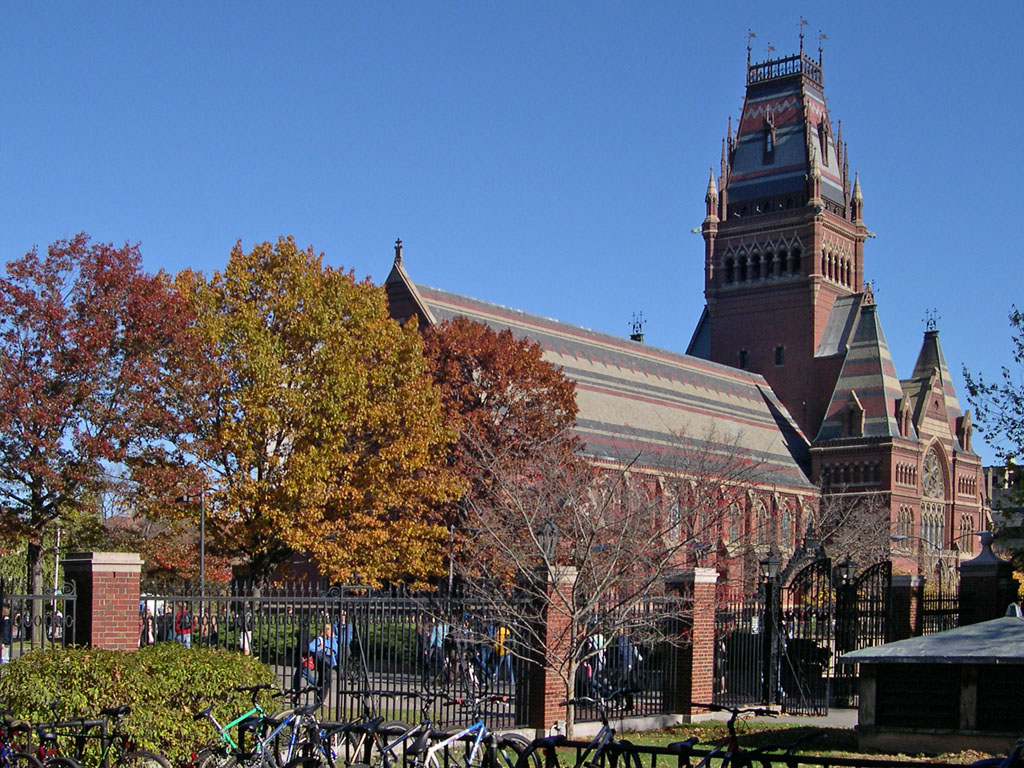
Sanders Theatre at Harvard University, location of many Glee Club concerts

The glee club performs a wide range of repertoire. Music of the Renaissance is an integral part of that repertoire, as is folk music, especially of America and Eastern Europe. In recent years, the glee club has performed numerous major works for male chorus, including Schubert's Gesang der Geister über den Wassern, Brahms's Alt-Rhapsodie, Schoenberg's A Survivor from Warsaw, and Argento's Revelation of St. John the Divine.

Symphony collaborations over the years have included multiple performances with the Boston Symphony Orchestra (BSO) under all of its conductors since 1917, as well as with the New York and Los Angeles Philharmonics, the Netherlands Chamber Orchestra, the Orchestra of St. Luke's, and the Italian Radio Orchestra. Some BSO highlights include the American premiere of Stravinsky’s Oedipus Rex, later recorded with the BSO under Bernstein, two Berlioz recordings (Romeo et Juliet and La Damnation de Faust), and Mozart’s Requiem. In 1973, the Glee Club performed Bernstein's Chichester Psalms with the composer conducting at the Vatican. The Glee Club now frequently performs with Boston's Orchestra of Emmanuel Music, including another performance of Stravinsky’s Oedipus Rex on February 23, 2018.

The Glee Club frequently performs traditional Harvard football songs, such as "Yo-Ho," "Ten Thousand Men of Harvard," "Harvardiana," "The Gridiron King," "Soldiers' Field," and "Up the Street."

Singers are divided into four parts: tenor 1, tenor 2, baritone, and bass, though various arrangements often require a few singers to switch parts for balance or for the entire group to re-divide into two, three, or five-part harmony.

=== Glee Club Lite ===
The glee club also has a subset called "Harvard Glee Club Lite" (or simply "Lite"). This group, which features 12–16 singers and performs pop, jazz, and folk a cappella arrangements, was formed in 1985 to give glee club members a chance to sing a wider range of music; Harvard has several a cappella groups on campus, and Lite allows students to experience both types of ensemble—a small, student-directed pop-driven group and a larger, faculty-led choral ensemble. Generally, much or all of Lite's repertoire is arranged by members. The signature song of the group is "Good Ol' A Cappella" by the Nylons.

=== Commissions and dedications ===
Another cornerstone of the glee club's repertoire is contemporary music; the group has a long history of commissioning or simply receiving work from prominent composers or arrangers, some of whom are listed below with the title of the work when available; many of these works note the dedication to the glee club on their title page:

- Darius Milhaud (Psaume 121)
- Francis Poulenc (Chanson à boire)
- Gustav Holst ("A Love Song", "How Mighty are the Sabbaths" and "Before Sleep" from Six Choruses, 1931–2)
- Walter Piston (Carnival Song)
- Irving Fine (Vultur Gryphus and others)
- Samuel Adler (Two Songs of Peace)
- Paul Moravec (Credo)
- Leonard Bernstein (Dedication)
- Elliott Carter (Tarantella, The Defense of Corinth, Emblems)
- John Harbison (Nunc Dimittis)
- Virgil Thomson (Cantantes Eamus)
- Randall Thompson (Quis multa gracilis, The Peaceable Kingdom and others)
- Toru Takemitsu (Grass)
- Morten Lauridsen (Ave Dulcissima Maria)
- Sir John Tavener (Awed by the Beauty)
- Stephen Paulus (Shall I Compare Thee)
- Dominick Argento (Apollo in Cambridge)
- Carol Barnett (One Equal Music)
- Frank Ferko (O Coruscans Lux Stellarum)
- Charles Fussell (A Walt Whitman Sampler)
- Tarik O'Regan (Se Lamentar Augelli)
- P.D.Q. Bach (A Veritable Paean of Praise)
- Brandon Waddles (Three Spirituals: "Lord, I Just Can't Keep from Crying," "I'm a Poor Li'l Orphan in Dis World," "Plenty Good Room")
- Kevin Puts (She Walks in Beauty)

In addition, the glee club's conductors have a long tradition of dedicating folk song arrangements and editions of Renaissance vocal pieces to the group; Jameson Marvin's arrangements are published primarily by Oxford University Publishing and Earthsongs.

== See also ==
- List of collegiate glee clubs
- Choir
