= Old Burying Ground (Cambridge, Massachusetts) =

Historic cemetery in Middlesex County, Massachusetts, U.S.

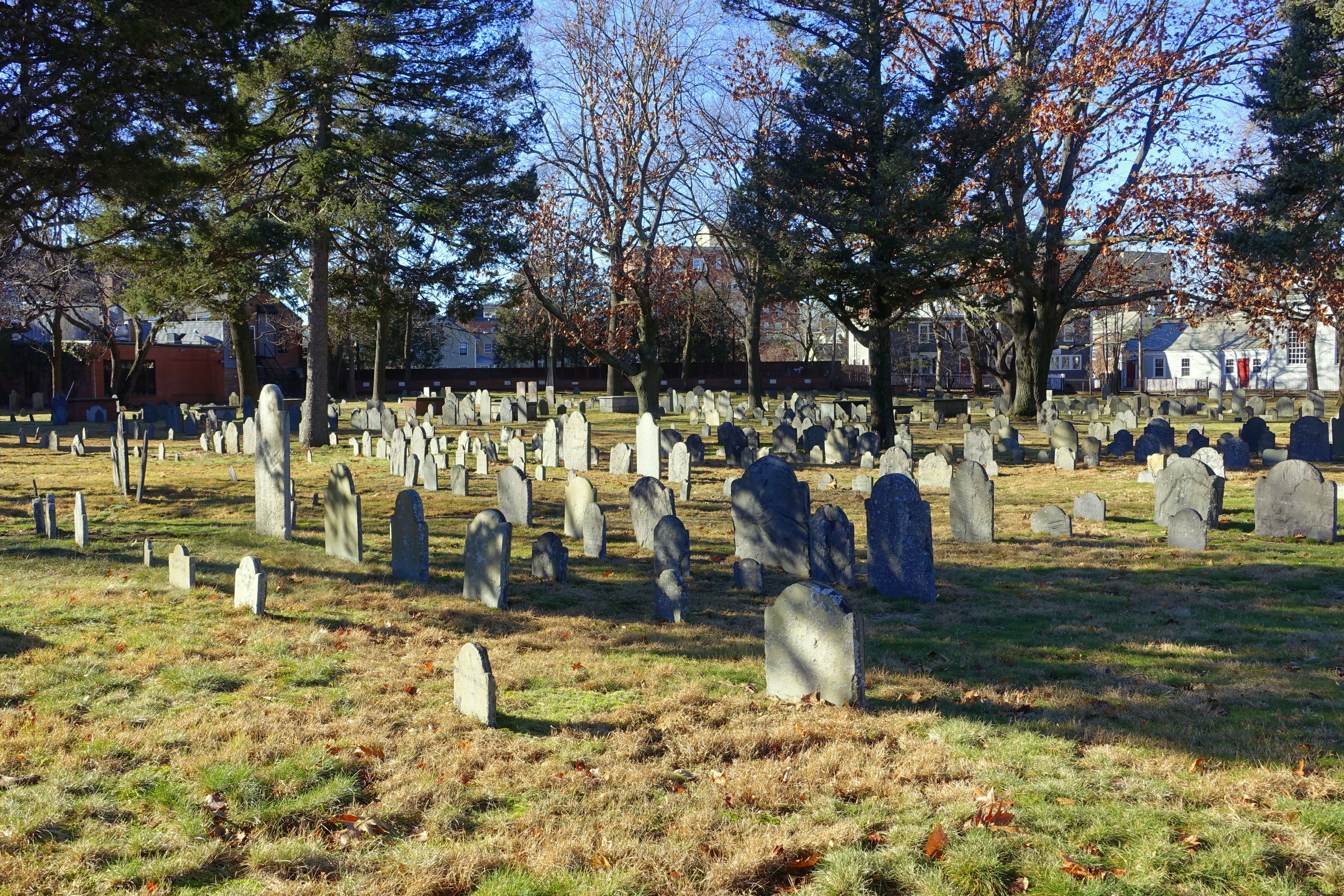
- The cemetery in 2018

Details
- Established: 1635
- Location: Cambridge, Massachusetts
- Country: United States
- Coordinates: 42°22′30″N 71°07′11″W
- Find a Grave: Old Burying Ground

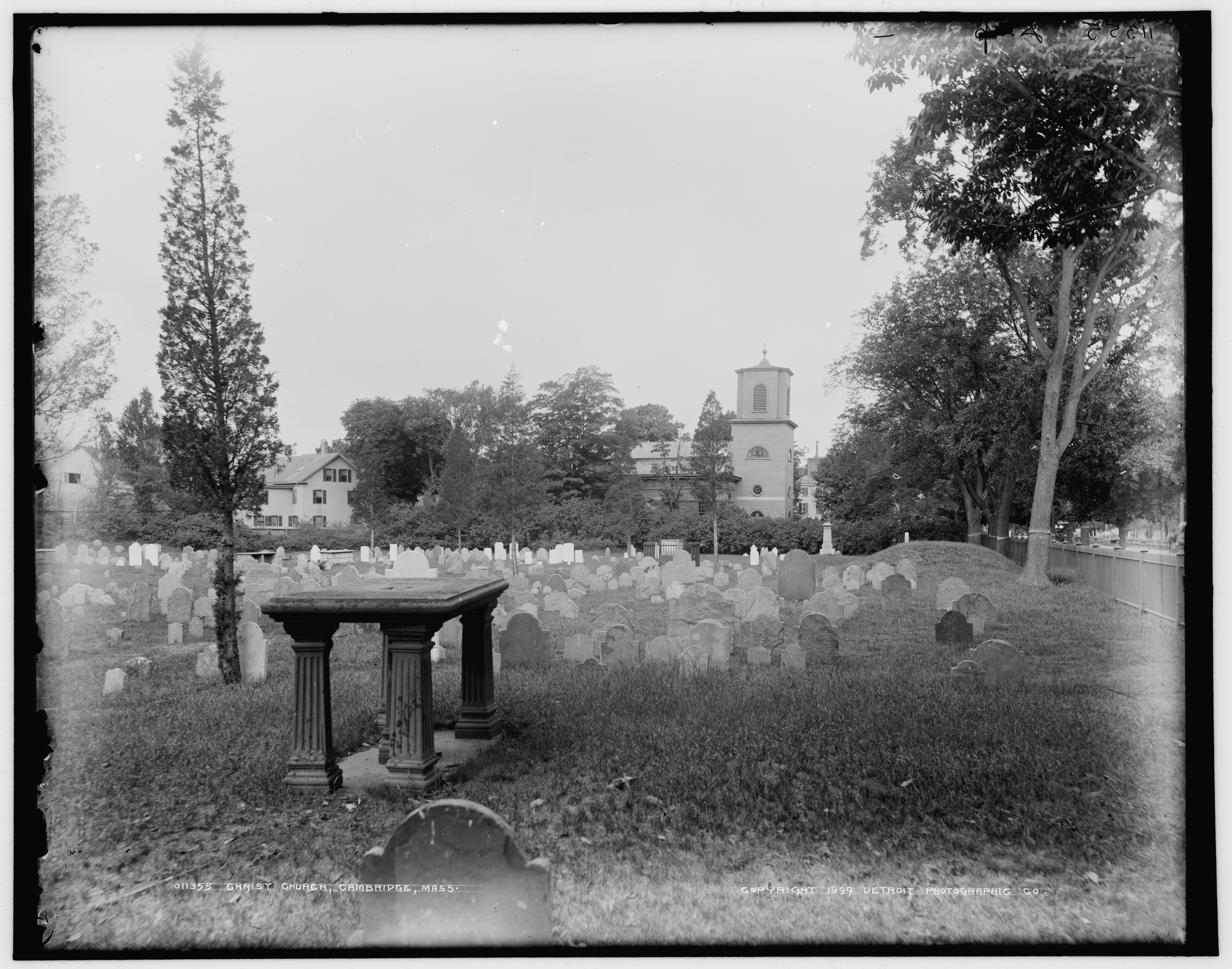
The cemetery in 1889

The Old Burying Ground, or Old Burial Ground, is a historic cemetery in Cambridge, Massachusetts, United States, located just outside Harvard Square. The cemetery opened in 1635.

== Notable burials ==
- Washington Allston – painter and poet
- Nathaniel Appleton – minister
- Jonathan Belcher – colonial American merchant, businessman, and politician (Governor of Massachusetts Bay)
- Rev. William Brattle – cleric, father of William Brattle
- Elijah Corlet – educator, schoolmaster of the Cambridge Grammar School
- Samuel McChord Crothers – minister with The First Parish in Cambridge
- Edmund Trowbridge Dana – jurist and author
- Francis Dana – Founding Father, lawyer, jurist, and statesman
- Richard Henry Dana Sr. – poet, critic, and lawyer
- Stephen Daye – first printer in colonial America
- Daniel Gookin – early settler and worker with Native Americans
- Jonathan Remington – colonial American jurist (associate justice Massachusetts Supreme Judicial Court)
- Thomas Shepard – minister
- Edmund Trowbridge – colonial American jurist (associate justice Massachusetts Supreme Judicial Court)
- Edward Wigglesworth – Colonial clergyman, teacher and theologian
- Cicely – enslaved servant of a Harvard tutor (the oldest surviving gravestone of a Black person in the Americas)

Several Presidents of Harvard College are buried here including:

- Charles Chauncy – second President of Harvard, 1654 to 1672
- Henry Dunster – first President of Harvard, 1640 to 1654
- Edward Holyoke – President of Harvard from 1737 to 1769
- John Leverett – President of Harvard from 1708 to 1724
- Urian Oakes – President of Harvard from 1675 to 1680
- John Rogers – President of Harvard from 1682 to 1684
- Benjamin Wadsworth – clergyman and educator, minister of the First Church in Boston and President of Harvard from 1725 to 1737
- Joseph Willard – clergyman and academic, president of Harvard from 1781 to 1804

Cato Stedman and Neptune Frost black soldiers of the Continental Army 1775. Commemorated on a blue sign on the fence of The Old Burying Ground, Sage Street.
