= John Leverett the Younger =

Anglo-American lawyer and president of Harvard College

John Leverett

President of Harvard College
- In office 1708–1724
- Preceded by: Samuel Willard acting
- Succeeded by: Benjamin Wadsworth

Personal details
- Born: August 25, 1662 Boston, Massachusetts Bay Colony, British America
- Died: May 3, 1724 (aged 61) Boston, Massachusetts Bay Colony, British America
- Education: Harvard College

John Leverett (August 25, 1662 – May 3, 1724) was an early Anglo-American lawyer, politician, educator, and President of Harvard College.

== Early life and education ==
Leverett was born on August 25, 1662, in Boston, Massachusetts Bay Colony, the son of Hudson Leverett, an attorney, and Sarah (Payton) Leverett, and grandson of John Leverett who was later the governor of the Massachusetts Bay Colony. He was educated at Boston Latin School and Harvard College, where he graduated as a Bachelor of Arts in 1680 and a Master of Arts in 1683.

== Career ==
Leverett's coat of arms

For twelve years, Leverett was a resident fellow at Harvard. He was appointed in 1685 at the same time as William Brattle. Leverett and Brattle managed Harvard College while Harvard's President Increase Mather was in England for four years (1688–1692)

On November 25, 1697, Leverett married Margaret Rogers Berry, the daughter of former Harvard College president John Rogers. They had nine children, six of whom died in infancy. Margaret died on June 7, 1720. Leverett married secondly Sarah Crisp Harris. Sarah died on April 4, 1744.

John served in the Province of Massachusetts Bay as a justice of the peace (1699), a judge in the Court of Admiralty (1705), a justice of the Superior Court (1702–1708), judge of Probate Court for Middlesex County in Cambridge (1702–1708), legislator (1696–1702) and Speaker of the Colonial Massachusetts House of Representatives (1700–1702), and provincial councillor for eastern Maine (1706–1708).

Leverett acted as an Indian commissioner from Massachusetts during Queen Anne's War (1701–1713). He was unable to persuade the Iroquois to enter the war on the side of the British at a conference in 1704. Leverett raised and commanded a company of volunteers (as a lieutenant in the Military Company of Massachusetts, which he joined in 1704) in the failed assaults on French Port Royal, Acadia in 1707.

Leverett served as President of Harvard from January 14, 1708, until his death in 1724. In 1709, Leverett served as an emissary from Massachusetts Governor Joseph Dudley to New York Governor John Lovelace in negotiations for the establishment of military cooperation between Massachusetts and New York on the frontier and for an aborted invasion of Canada.

In 1719, Leverett helped to form the Lincolnshire Company which attempted to develop land in the Muscongus Patent in Maine, then part of Massachusetts. Leverett had inherited a share of this patent from his grandfather John Leverett. Nothing was accomplished and the grant was later taken over by Samuel Waldo, a Boston merchant.

He was elected a Fellow of the Royal Society in 1714.

== Death ==
Leverett died in Boston, Massachusetts Bay Colony, on May 3, 1724, at age 61. He is interred in the Old Burying Ground, Cambridge, Massachusetts.

Legal offices
Preceded by Elisha Cooke, Sr.	Associate Justice of the Massachusetts Superior Court of Judicature; 1702–1708	Succeeded by Jonathan Curwin
Academic offices
Preceded by Samuel Willard, acting	President of Harvard College; 1708–1724	Succeeded by Benjamin Wadsworth
