= Elijah Corlet =

American educator

- Born: 1610
- Died: February 24, 1687
- Education: Lincoln College, Pembroke College
- Occupation: Schoolmaster

Elijah Corlet (1610 – February 24, 1687) was schoolmaster of the Cambridge Grammar School in Cambridge, Massachusetts for most of the late 17th century. Many of his pupils were early students of Harvard College, including the minister Cotton Mather. From 1672 to 1700, the Cambridge Grammar School sent more students to Harvard than any other school.

== Early life ==
Corlet was the son of Henry Corlet, a London wax chandler. He was an exhibitioner at Christ's Hospital. He began studying at Lincoln College, Oxford in March 1626–27 at the age of 17 and was awarded his B.A. in or circa 1631. He was ordained as a deacon in 1633. He was awarded an M.A. from Pembroke College, Cambridge in 1638. He worked as a schoolmaster in Framlingham and the Halstead Grammar School in Essex.

== Career ==
It is not known when Corlet emigrated to the Massachusetts Bay Colony but he was schoolmaster of the Cambridge Grammar School by 1642 and was the first schoolmaster who was paid in part with public funds. Corlet was mentioned in New England's First Fruits, a pamphlet written in 1642 and published in England in 1643 to promote the colony and Harvard. The authors wrote:

And by the side of the Colledge a faire Grammar Schoole, for the training up of young Scholars, and fitting of them for Academicall Learning, that still as they are judged ripe, they may be received into the Colledge of this Schoole: Master Corlet is the Mr., who hath very well approved himselfe for his abilities, dexterity and painfulnesse in teaching and education of the youth under him

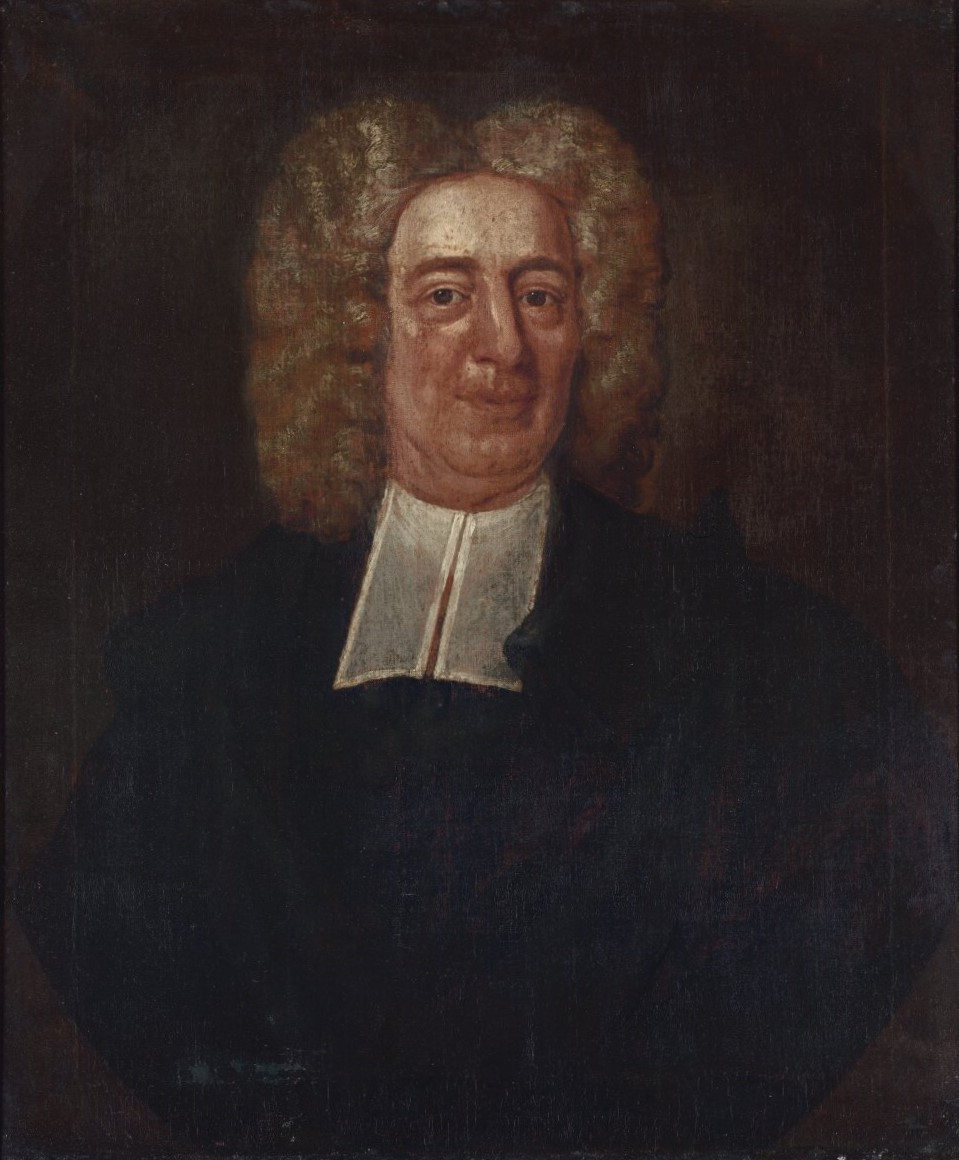
Cotton Mather

In his Magnalia Christi Americana, Mather wrote of Corlet:

...that memorable old school-master in Cambridge, from whose education our colledge and country has received so many of its worthy men, that he is himself worthy to have his name celebrated in no less a paragraph of our church history...

Corlet helped Mather manage his stammer, a stammer which Mather thought threatened to prevent him from becoming a preacher like his father and grandfather. Corlet advised Mather to speak in "a very Deliberate way of Speaking; a Drawling that shall be little short of Singing". This has been cited as an early example of speech-language pathology in America.

Corlet also taught a number of Native American students at his school, including possibly Caleb Cheeshahteaumuck and Joel Iacoomes, both of whom went on to Harvard.

== Later life and death ==
Corlet taught at the school until his death in 1687. He was the subject of a blank verse elegy by Nehemiah Walter (1663–1750), who was frequently employed by Corlet to run the school when he was absent.

Corlet married Barbara Cutter around 1643. He was made a freeman in 1645. His son Ammi Ruhamah Corlet graduated from Harvard in 1670 and died of smallpox on February 1, 1679.

== Legacy ==
Corlet is portrayed in Geraldine Brooks' book of historical fiction Caleb's Crossing.
