= Samuel Willard =

American theologian (1640–1707)

The Reverend Samuel Willard
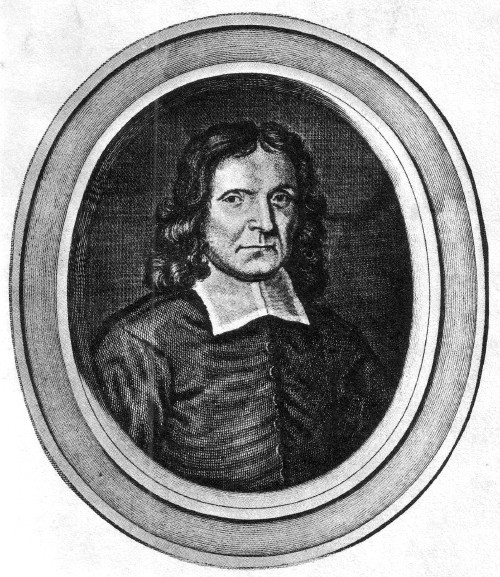

Acting President of Harvard College
- In office September 6, 1701 – September 12, 1707
- Preceded by: Increase Mather
- Succeeded by: John Leverett

Personal details
- Born: January 31, 1640 Concord, Massachusetts Bay Colony
- Died: September 12, 1707 (aged 67) Cambridge, Province of Massachusetts Bay
- Resting place: Granary Burying Ground
- Spouse(s): Abigail Sherman (m. 1664) Eunice Tyng (m. 1679)
- Occupation: Minister

Samuel Willard (January 31, 1640 – September 12, 1707) was a New England Puritan clergyman who served as the acting president of Harvard from 1701 to 1707. He was a minister in Groton, Massachusetts from 1663 to 1676, before being driven out by the Indians during King Philip's War. Willard was pastor of the Third Church, Boston, from 1678 until his death. He notably opposed the Salem witch trials and published many sermons: the folio volume, A Compleat Body of Divinity, was published posthumously in 1726.

== Early life and education ==
Coat of arms of Simon Willard

Samuel Willard was born on January 31, 1640, in Concord, Massachusetts. Willard's parents were Major Simon Willard and Mary Sharpe, who had emigrated from England to New England in 1634, settling first in Cambridge, Massachusetts. In 1635, with Rev. Peter Bulkeley, they established the town of Concord, where Samuel was born the sixth child and second son. After the death of his mother, his father remarried twice, and Samuel was one of seventeen children born to the family. At the age of fifteen, Willard entered Harvard College in 1655, graduating in 1659, and was the only member of his class to receive an M.A.

== Ministry in Groton ==
In 1663, Willard began preaching in Groton, then at the very frontier of the Massachusetts Bay Colony. The town's first minister, John Miller, had become ill and, when he died, the congregation asked Willard to stay, and he was officially ordained by them in 1664.

On August 8, 1664, Willard married Abigail Sherman of Watertown. In 1670, he became a freeman, with full privileges of citizenship. In 1671, 16-year-old Elizabeth Knapp fell ill and appeared to be possessed. Willard wrote about the strange behavior. Groton was destroyed on March 10, 1676, during King Philip's War, and the 300 residents abandoned the town. Willard and his family removed to Charlestown, Massachusetts.

== Ministry in Boston ==
Willard preached at the Third Church in Boston during the illness of Rev. Thomas Thacher and gave an election-day sermon on June 5. The Third Church called Willard to be its teacher, an associate pastor, on April 10, 1678. When Thacher died on October 15, Willard became the only pastor. Members of the congregation included a variety of influential members of the colony: John Hull, Samuel Sewall, Edward Rawson, Thomas Brattle, Joshua Scottow, Hezekiah Usher and Capt. John Alden (the son of John and Priscilla Alden of Plymouth). His wife Abigail died some time in the first half of 1679; in July that year he married Eunice Tyng, a possible sister-in-law of Joseph Dudley.

While in Boston, he married Josiah Franklin and Abiah Folger, the parents of the American polymath and Founding Father, Benjamin Franklin.

=== Church of England ===
Sir Edmund Andros asked each of the Puritan churches in Boston if its meeting house could be used for services of the Church of England. When he was rebuffed, he demanded and was given keys to Samuel Willard's Third Church in 1687 in a clear power play. Services were held there under the auspices of Rev. Robert Ratcliff until 1688, when King's Chapel was built. These actions highlighted him as pro-Anglican in the eyes of local Puritans, who later accused him of involvement in a "horrid Popish plot".

== Leading Harvard ==
Willard was the acting president of Harvard College, although having the nominal title of vice-president, from 1701 until his death in 1707.

== Works ==
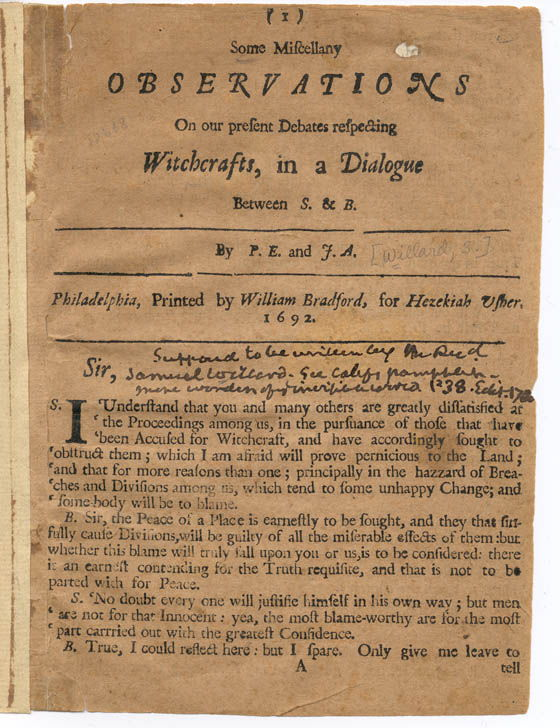
First page of Some Miscellany Observations On our present Debates respecting Witchcrafts, in a Dialogue Between S. & B., attributed to Samuel Willard.

- Mercy Magnified on a Penitent Prodigal, or a brief discourse, wherein Christs Parable of the lost Son found, is opened and applied. Boston: Samuel Green, for Samuel Philips. 1684.
- Samuel Willard; Philip English; John Alden (1692). Some Miscellany Observations on Our Present Debates Respecting Witchcraft: In a Dialogue Between S. & B. Philadelphia: William Bradford.
- Some Miscellany Observations On our present Debates respecting Witchcrafts, in a Dialogue Between S. & B.
- "A Compleat Body of Divinity". Boston: B. Green. 1726. Internet Archive
- Some Brief Sacramental Meditations Preparatory for Communion at the Great Ordinance of the Supper (2nd ed.). Boston: Green, Bushell, and Allen. 1743.
- "A briefe account of a strange & unusuall Providence of God befallen to Elizabeth Knap of Groton" in Samuel A. Green, ed., Groton In The Witchcraft Times, Groton, MA: [s.n.] 1883

== See also ==
- Descendants of Simon Willard (1605–1676)

== Notes ==
Academic offices
Preceded by Increase Mather	President of Harvard College acting 1701–1707	Succeeded by John Leverett
