= President of Harvard University =

Head of Harvard University

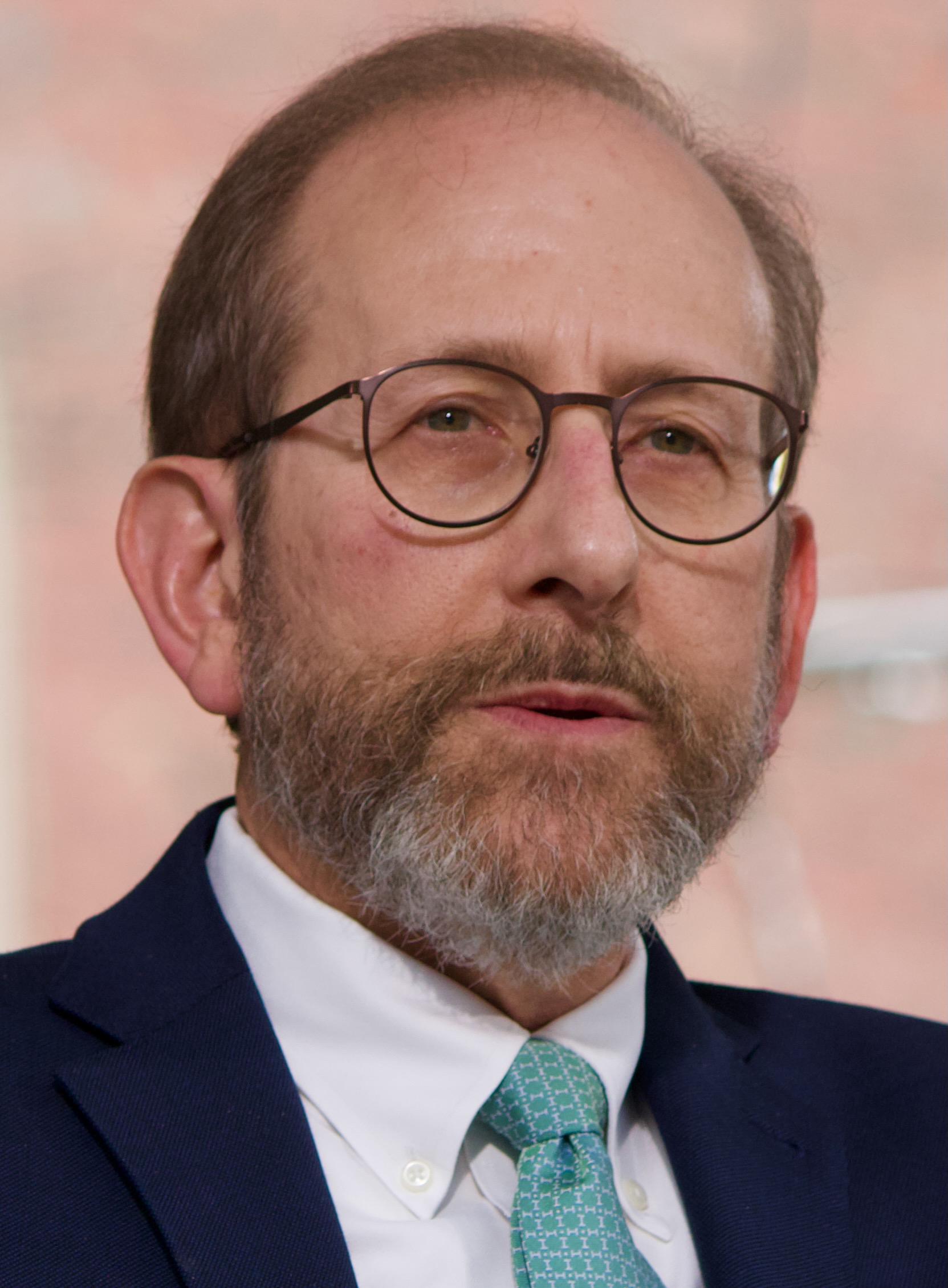
- Incumbent; Alan Garber since January 2, 2024
- Appointer: Harvard Corporation
- Formation: 1640
- First holder: Henry Dunster
- Website: harvard.edu/president/

The president of Harvard University is the chief administrator of Harvard University and the ex officio president of the Harvard Corporation. Each is appointed by and is responsible to the other members of that body, who delegate to the president the day-to-day running of the university.

Originally the President of Harvard College, the post-holder's title changed in 1780, when the Constitution of Massachusetts recognized Harvard College as a university.

Harvard's current president is Alan Garber, who took office on January 2, 2024, following the resignation of Claudine Gay. In December 2025, the Harvard Corporation announced his term would be extended indefinitely.

== Role ==
The president plays an important part in university-wide planning and strategy. Each names a faculty's dean (and, since the foundation of the office in 1994, the university's provost), and grants tenure to recommended professors. However, the president is expected to make such decisions after extensive consultation with faculty members.

Recently, however, the job has become increasingly administrative, especially as fund-raising campaigns have taken on central importance in large institutions such as Harvard. Some have criticized this trend to the extent it has prevented the president from focusing on substantive issues in higher education.

Each president is professor in some department of the university and teaches from time to time.

The university maintains an official residence for the president's use, which from 1912 until 1971, was President's House, and since then has been Elmwood.

== Influence ==
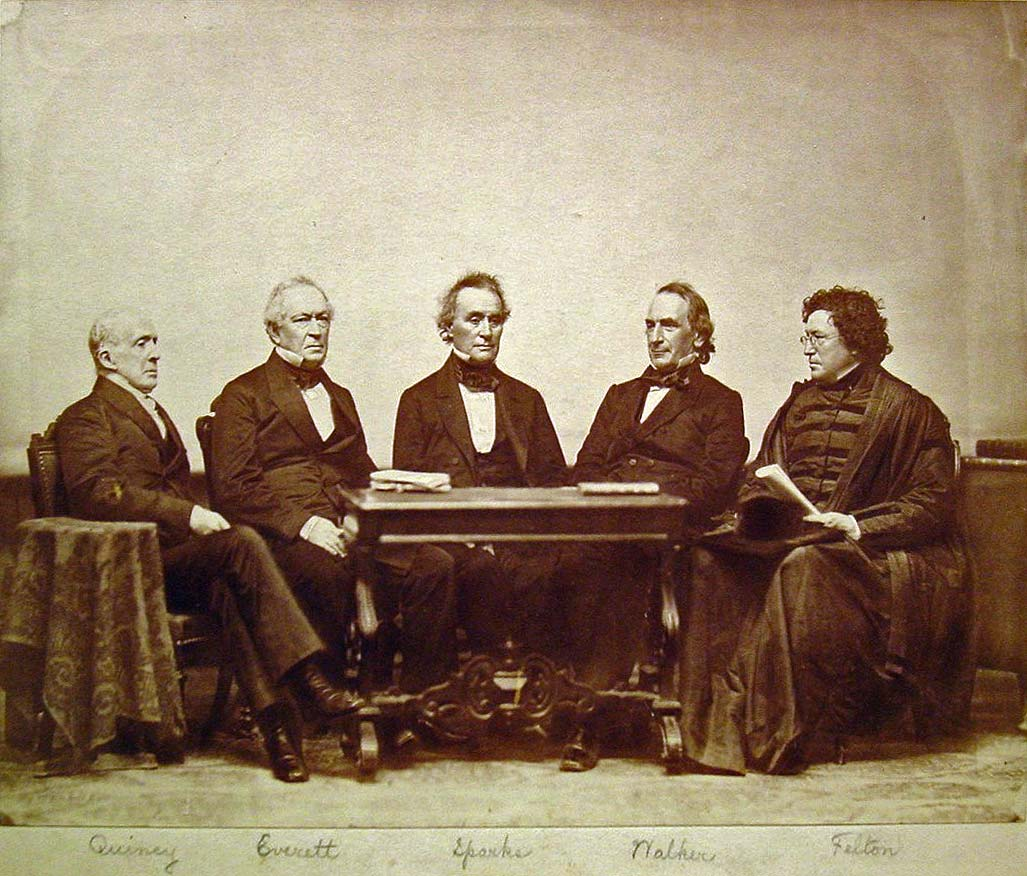
Five Harvard University presidents, sitting in order of when they served. Left-to-right: Josiah Quincy III, Edward Everett, Jared Sparks, James Walker and Cornelius Conway Felton.

Harvard presidents have traditionally influenced educational practices nationwide. Charles W. Eliot, for example, originated America's familiar system of a smorgasbord of elective courses available to each student; James B. Conant worked to introduce standardized testing; Derek Bok and Neil L. Rudenstine argued for the continued importance of diversity in higher education.

== History ==
At Harvard's founding it was headed by a "schoolmaster", Nathaniel Eaton. In 1640, when Henry Dunster was brought in, he adopted the title of president. Since Harvard was founded for the training of Puritan clergy, and even though its mission was soon broadened, nearly all presidents through the end of the 18th century were in holy orders.

All presidents from Leonard Hoar in 1672 through Nathan Pusey in 1971 were graduates of Harvard College. Of the presidents since Pusey, nearly all earned a graduate degree at Harvard. The only exception has been Drew Gilpin Faust, who was the first president since the seventeenth century with no earned Harvard degree.

== Presidents of Harvard ==
The following persons have served as president of Harvard University:

No.	Image	Presidents	Term start	Term end	Length	Ref.
Headmaster of the New College (1637–1639)
–		Nathaniel Eaton (Note: Referred to as "schoolmaster" of Harvard College Fired for "embezzlement and beating students")	1637	1639	2 years	
Presidents of Harvard College (1639–1780)
1		Henry Dunster (Note: Forced to resign for speaking out against and interrupting infant baptisms)	August 27, 1640	October 24, 1654	14 years, 1 month and 27 days	
2		Charles Chauncy	November 2, 1654	February 19, 1672 (Note: Died in office)	17 years, 3 months and 17 days	
3		Leonard Hoar (Note: Forced to resign)	December 10, 1672	March 15, 1675	2 years, 3 months and 5 days	
acting		Urian Oakes	April 7, 1675	February 2, 1680	4 years, 9 months and 26 days	
4		Urian Oakes	February 2, 1680	July 25, 1681	1 year, 5 months and 23 days	
5		John Rogers	April 10, 1682	July 12, 1684	2 years, 3 months and 2 days	
acting		Increase Mather (Note: Forced to resign for refusing to reside in Cambridge.)	June 11, 1685	June 23, 1686	1 year and 12 days	
rector		Increase Mather	June 23, 1686	June 27, 1692	6 years and 4 days	
6		Increase Mather	June 27, 1692	June 29, 1701	9 years and 2 days	
acting		Samuel Willard (Note: Resigned due to illness)	September 6, 1701	September 12, 1707	6 years and 6 days	
7		John Leverett (Note: First lawyer to serve as president.)	January 14, 1708	May 3, 1724	16 years, 3 months and 19 days	
8		Benjamin Wadsworth	July 7, 1725	March 16, 1737	11 years, 8 months and 9 days	
9		Edward Holyoke (Note: At 79, the oldest president.)	1737	1769	32 years	
acting		John Winthrop (Note: Declined presidency on a permanent basis on grounds of old age.)	1769	1769		
10		Samuel Locke (Note: Resigned after fathering a child out of wedlock.)	May 21, 1770	December 1, 1773	3 years, 6 months and 10 days	
acting		John Winthrop (Note: Declined presidency again on a permanent basis on grounds of old age)	1773	1774		
11		Samuel Langdon (Note: Students petitioned the Corporation to dismiss him and he resigned.)	July 18, 1774	August 30, 1780	6 years, 1 month and 12 days	
Presidents of Harvard University (1780–present)
acting		Edward Wigglesworth	1780	1781		
12		Joseph Willard	September 5, 1781	September 25, 1804	23 years and 20 days	
acting		Eliphalet Pearson	1804	1806		
13		Samuel Webber	May 6, 1806	July 17, 1810	4 years, 2 months and 11 days	
acting		Henry Ware	1810	1810		
14		John Thornton Kirkland (Note: Suffered a stroke, was accused of financial mismanagement by the Harvard Corporation, and resigned)	November 14, 1810	April 2, 1828	17 years, 4 months and 19 days	
acting		Henry Ware	1828	1829		
15		Josiah Quincy III	January 29, 1829	August 27, 1845	16 years, 6 months and 29 days	
16		Edward Everett (Note: Later became United States Secretary of State and United States Senator.)	February 5, 1846	February 1, 1848	2 years, 11 months and 27 days	
17		Jared Sparks	February 1, 1849	February 10, 1853	4 years and 9 days	
18		James Walker	February 10, 1853	January 26, 1860	6 years, 11 months and 16 days	
19		Cornelius Conway Felton	February 16, 1860	February 26, 1862	2 years and 10 days	
acting		Andrew Preston Peabody	1862	1862		
20		Thomas Hill	October 6, 1862	September 30, 1868	5 years, 11 months and 24 days	
acting		Andrew Preston Peabody	1868	1869		
21		Charles William Eliot (Note: At 35, the youngest president. Longest term of office.)	March 12, 1869	May 19, 1909	40 years, 2 months and 7 days	
acting		Henry Pickering Walcott (Note: For a portion of 1900-1901 and 1905, Henry Pickering Walcott served as acting president while Eliot was on vacation.)	1900	1901		
acting		Henry Pickering Walcott	1905	1905		
22		A. Lawrence Lowell	May 19, 1909	June 21, 1933	24 years, 1 month and 2 days	
23		James B. Conant (Note: Retired to become Allied High Commissioner for Occupied Germany and later U.S. ambassador to Germany)	1933	1953	19 years, 6 months and 22 days	
24		Nathan Pusey (Note: "Pusey called in the Cambridge police to end a student sit-in" in 1969. "Sharply criticized for his handling of the situation, he announced in 1970 that he would retire the following year")	June 1, 1953	June 30, 1971	18 years and 29 days	
25		Derek Bok	July 1, 1971	June 30, 1991	19 years, 11 months and 29 days	
acting		Henry Rosovsky (Note: served as acting president in 1984 and 1987 when Bok traveled and took brief sabbaticals.)	1984	1984		
acting		Henry Rosovsky	1987	1987		
26		Neil Rudenstine	July 1, 1991	June 30, 2001	9 years, 11 months and 29 days	
acting		Albert Carnesale (Note: Provost Albert Carnesale served as acting president during Rudenstine's medical leave of absence.)	November 29, 1994	February 1995		
27		Lawrence Summers (Note: First Jewish president. Resigned following several clashes with faculty resulting in a no-confidence vote.)	July 1, 2001	June 30, 2006	4 years, 11 months and 29 days	
interim		Derek Bok	July 1, 2006	June 30, 2007	11 months and 29 days	
28		Drew Gilpin Faust (Note: First female president)	July 1, 2007	June 30, 2018	10 years, 11 months and 29 days	
29		Lawrence Bacow	July 1, 2018	June 30, 2023	4 years, 11 months and 29 days	
30		Claudine Gay (Note: First black president. Shortest serving president; resigned following congressional hearings into antisemitism on campus and allegations of plagiarism.)	July 1, 2023	January 2, 2024	6 months and 1 day	
interim		Alan Garber	January 2, 2024	August 2, 2024	7 months	
31		Alan Garber	August 2, 2024	present	2 years, 3 months and 6 days	

Table notes:

== Timeline of Harvard University presidential terms ==
Presidents of Harvard University
