= Gershom Bulkeley =

Gershom Bulkeley (1635 – December 2, 1713) was a Christian minister, physician, surgeon and magistrate.

== Early life, family and education ==
He was born in Cambridge, Massachusetts to Reverend Peter Bulkeley and Grace Chetwoode Bulkeley. His father Peter Bulkeley was a graduate of St. John's College, Cambridge; and a founder of Concord, Massachusetts, as well as the first minister in the community. The family were Puritan.

Gershom Bulkeley was an early graduate of Harvard University, receiving his bachelor's degree in 1655 and possibly his master's degree in 1658.

== Career ==
In 1661, Gershom Bulkeley became the minister of the Congregational church in New London, Connecticut, where he served for about five years. He then became minister of the Congregational church in the town of Wethersfield, Connecticut where he served until 1677. He left the ministry and practiced as a physician in Glastonbury.

During the period of the Connecticut Witch Trials, which predate the more famous Salem Witch Trials, Bulkeley expressed considerable skepticism about the evidence, saying that he had heard nothing of any weight to convince him that anyone was guilty of witchcraft. In particular, he argued that Mercy Disborough, one of the only two women accused in Connecticut who actually stood trial for witchcraft, was the victim of the malice of her neighbours. Mercy was found guilty and sentenced to death but received a reprieve. She was set free and died sometime after 1709.

== Personal life ==
After receiving his master's degree, he married Sarah Chauncy, daughter of the President of Harvard University, Charles Chauncy. He was the father of Dorothy Bulkeley Treat (1662-1757) whose medical journals are included in the Bulkeley manuscript collection maintained by the Hartford Medical Society Library, University of Connecticut, and the Trinity College Watkinson Library, A third manuscript located at the Watkinson Bulkeley collection entitled “Medical Cabinet” may also be in Dorothy’s handwriting and emphasized the secrecy of alchemical research.

A contentious battle occurred over Bulkeley's will between his son John and daughter Dorothy where John claimed Dorothy forced her son’s interest in medicine so that she could control her father’s library and equipment; however, it was likely primarily used by Dorothy. As executrix of her father’s estate by codicil, and one of few women who gained insights into alchemy, early chemistry, and seventeenth-century clinical practice largely due to the abundant library of books and manuscripts, often hand copied, during Bulkeley's extensive travel abroad, Dorothy shared her father’s interest in alchemical healing.

He died December 2, 1713, at age 77 (almost 78). He was buried behind the Congregational Church in Wethersfield.

== In other works ==
Bulkeley is mentioned and appears in the historical novel The Witch of Blackbird Pond. He is a tutor to John Holbrook who is learning to be a minister and is a respected leader to the community.
