= Leonard Hoar =

American academic administrator

The Reverend Leonard Hoar

3rd President of Harvard College
- In office December 10, 1672 – November 28, 1675
- Preceded by: Charles Chauncy
- Succeeded by: Urian Oakes (acting)

Personal details
- Born: 1630 Gloucestershire, England
- Died: November 28, 1675 (aged 44–45) Boston, Massachusetts Bay Colony, British America

Leonard Hoar (1630 – November 28, 1675) was an English-born American Congregational minister and educator who served as the third president of Harvard College from 1672 to 1675. His tenure was one of immense disapproval.

== Life ==
Born in Gloucestershire about 1630, he was the fourth son of Charles Hoare, by Joanna Hinkesman of Gloucester. Some time after the death of his father in 1638 he emigrated with his mother to America. Hoar, as he thenceforth called himself, graduated at Harvard College in 1650, and in 1653 returned to England, where he became a preacher. Through the interest of Henry Mildmay he was beneficed at Wanstead, Essex, from which he was ejected by the 1662 Act of Uniformity. A Cambridge Master of Arts (MA Cantab) by incorporation, he was awarded the degree of Doctor of Medicine (MD) by Cambridge per literas regias in 1671.

His niece, Anna Flynt, and her husband, Timothy Dwight, were members of the Dwight family and the ancestors of Timothy Dwight IV, Timothy Dwight V, and Theodore Dwight Woolsey, presidents of Yale University.

== Harvard presidency and death ==
In 1672 Hoar went again to Massachusetts to preach, by invitation, at the Old South Church, Boston. He brought a letter, dated 5 February 1672, addressed to the magistrates and ministers in Massachusetts Bay by thirteen nonconformist ministers in and around London, friends of the colony and agents in raising funds for a new college building, who strongly recommended Hoar for the post of president of Harvard as successor to Charles Chauncy, who died 19 February 1672. The general court voted an increase of salary on the condition that Hoar was elected. He was accordingly chosen, to the disappointment of Urian Oakes, who was widely regarded as Chauncy's legitimate successor. Hoar was immediately elected and installed as President of Harvard on December 10, 1672; a position he held until he resigned on March 15, 1675.

Hoar had high ambitions for Harvard as research centre, as he wrote to Robert Boyle at this time. He modernized technical education by introducing a garden and orchard, a workshop, and a chemical laboratory to Harvard. He was the first president of Harvard College who was also a graduate of it; but he was not well liked by his students or the people of Massachusetts, in part because of his radical religious views. The facts of his time in office remain obscure. Samuel Sewall was educated at Harvard by Hoar, one of only three students to graduate from Harvard in 1673. He was also one of the few to come to Hoar's defense in 1674 or 1675, just before Hoar was forced to resign. Some members of the corporation had combined against him, with the result that all the students, with the exception of three, had left. Sewall later argued that "the causes of the lowness of the Colledge were external as well as internal."

Daniel Munro Wilson wrote

At all events the students fell away from the president, and 'set themselves to Travestie whatever he did and said, and aggravate everything in his behavior disagreeable to them, with a design to make him Odious'.

Cotton Mather in his Magnalia Christi Americana stated that

He was forced to resign ... 'his grief threw him into a Consumption whereof he died November 28, 1675 in Boston'.

— (Cotton Mather)

His epitaph in the Hancock Cemetery at Quincy, Massachusetts, reads:

Leonard Hoar - died Nov.28,1675 in Boston a.45, and interred here Dec.6, new gs. Three precious friends under this tombstone lie, patterns to aged, youth, & infancy, a great mother, her learned son, with child, the first and last went free. He was exil'd in love to Christ, this country, and dear friends. He left his own, cross'd seas, and for amends was here extoll'd, envy'd, all in a breath, his noble consort leaves is drawn to death. Stranger chances may befall us ere we die, blest they who arrive well eternity, God grant some names, o though New Englands friend, don't sooner fade than thine, if times don't mend.

His wife Bridget, daughter of John Lisle the regicide, died at Boston, Massachusetts, on 25 May 1723. By her he had two daughters:

- Bridget, who married, on 21 June 1689, the Rev. Thomas Cotton of London, a liberal benefactor of Harvard College; and
- Tryphena.

== Works ==
He produced work on biblical scholarship. He was author of:

- 'Index Biblicus: or, the Historical Books of the Holy Scripture abridged. With each book, chapter, and sum of diverse matter distinguished, and a chronology to every eminent epocha of time superadded. With an Harmony of the Four Evangelists and a table thereunto, &c.' [by L. H.], London, 1668 (another edition 1669). It was afterwards reissued as 'Index Biblicus Multijugus: or, a Table to the Holy Scripture. The second edition, &c.' [by L. H.], London, 1672.
- 'The First Catalogue of Members of Harvard College,' 1674. The only copy known was found in 1842 by James Savage in the State Paper Office in London, and was printed in the 'Proceedings' of the Massachusetts Historical Society for October 1864 (p. 11), a few copies with a title-page being issued separately.
- 'The Sting of Death and Death Unstung, delivered in two Sermons, preached on the occasion of the death of the Lady Mildmay,' Boston [Mass.], 1680, published by Hoar's nephew, Josiah Flint.

== Works cited ==
- Dwight, Benjamin Woodbridge (1874). The History of the Descendants of John Dwight, of Dedham, Mass. J. F. Trow & son, printers and bookbinders.

Academic offices
Preceded by Charles Chauncy	President of Harvard College; 1672–1675	Succeeded by Urian Oakes, acting
