= Richard Henry Dana Sr. =

American poet

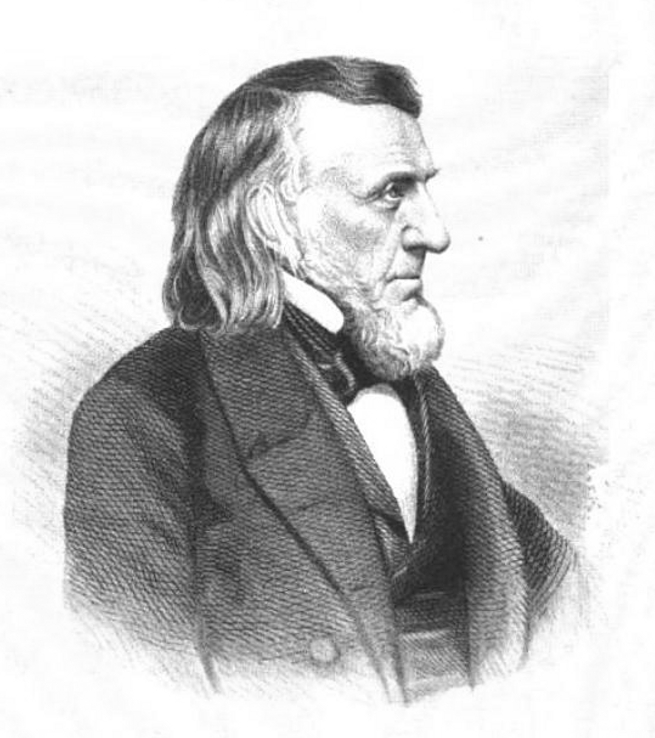
- Born: November 15, 1787; Cambridge, Massachusetts, U.S.
- Died: February 2, 1879 (aged 91); Boston, Massachusetts, U.S.
- Resting place: Old Burying Ground
- Education: Harvard College
- Children: Richard Henry Dana Jr.
- Relatives: Francis Dana (father)

Richard Henry Dana Sr. (November 15, 1787 – February 2, 1879) was an American poet, critic and lawyer. His son, Richard Henry Dana Jr., also became a lawyer and author.

== Biography ==
Richard Henry Dana was born in Cambridge, Massachusetts on November 15, 1787, and was the son of Federalist judge Francis Dana. After attending school in Newport, Rhode Island, he enrolled at Harvard College and was suspended after participating in the so-called Rotten Cabbage Riots in 1807 before graduating in 1808 despite not returning to classes. Dana passed the bar in 1811 and became a lawyer, but seldom practiced law. He married Ruth Charlotte Smith and they had four children including Richard Henry Dana Jr. Despite having graduated from there, Dana accused Harvard of smothering genius, and believed that the minds of poets were more insightful than the general community.

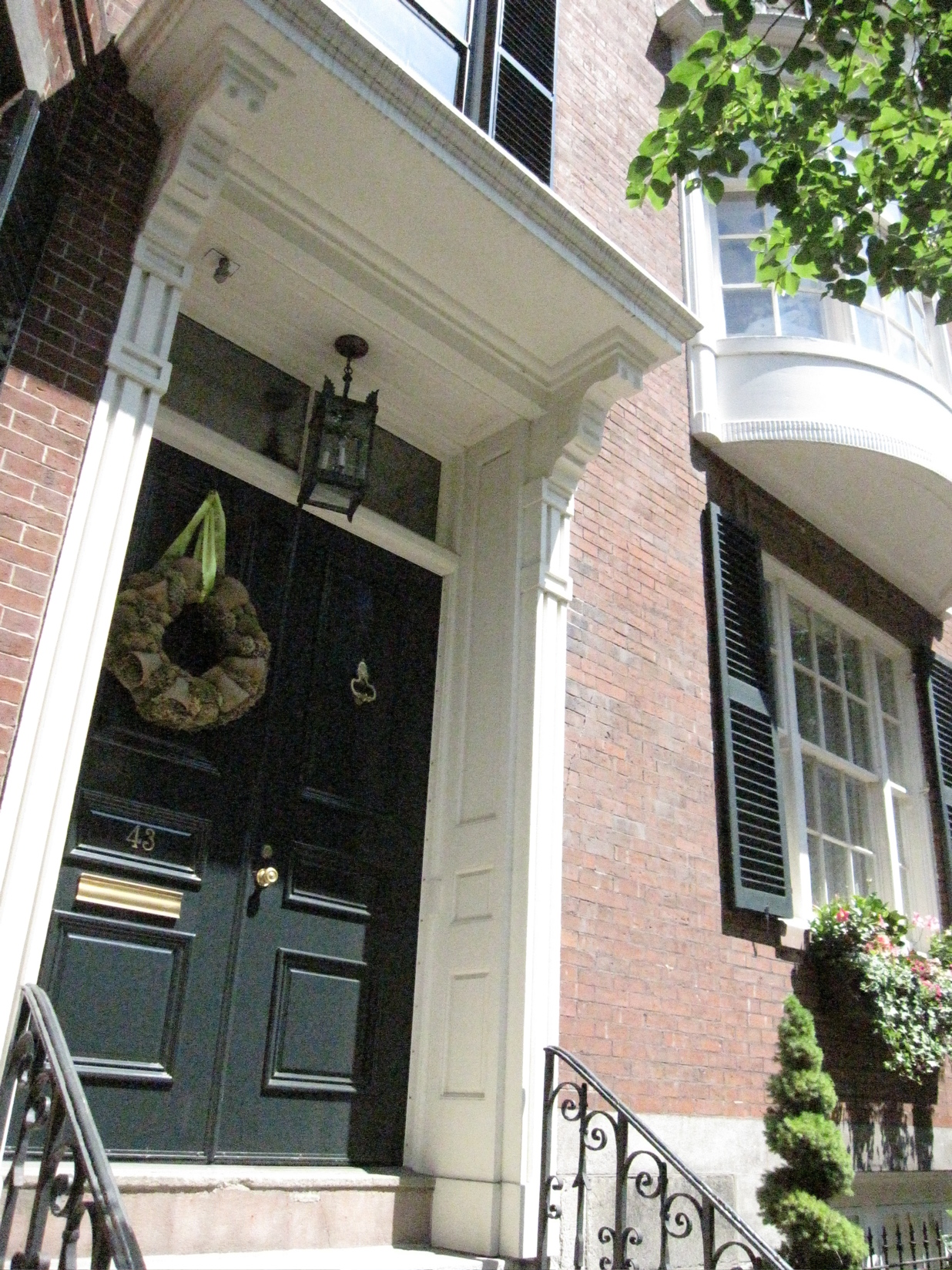
Dana's home on Beacon Hill, Boston

Between 1817 and 1827, he was the first American to write major critiques of Romanticism in literature, though his views were unconventional for his time. In a review of the poetry of Washington Allston, he noted his belief that poetry was the highest form of art, though it should be simple and must avoid didacticism. Dana also criticized the Transcendentalism movement. He wrote, "Emerson & the other Spiritualists, or Supernaturalists, or whatever they are called, or may be pleased to call themselves... [have] madness in their hearts". Dana was a member of the Anthology Club. In 1817, he and others in the club founded the North American Review. During his time as the magazine's associate editor, he accepted William Cullen Bryant's poem "Thanatopsis" for publication and the two eventually formed a long-term friendship. Dana had originally been skeptical of the poem as he believed no American could have writtend it.

Dana used the magazine as an outlet for his criticism, though he lost editorial control of it on account of his opposition to standard conventions. Though some of his criticisms were controversial when first published, by 1850 his opinions were conventional. As he wrote at the time, "Much that was once held to be presumptuous novelty... [became] little better than commonplace". Among his criticisms, he defended the Lake Poets but wrote disparagingly about Alexander Pope.

In 1821, Dana founded a periodical titled The Idle Man, modeled after Samuel Johnson's The Idler, though it lasted only four issues. Most of its contents were written by Dana himself. Dana's friend Washington Allston began writing Monaldi for inclusion in the magazine before it was discontinued; the novel was not published until 1842.

Dana published what became one of his most well-known poems, "The Buccaneer", in 1827. A narrative poem of more than 700 lines, it was strongly influenced by Samuel Taylor Coleridge's The Rime of the Ancient Mariner and remained popular through the 1830s.

As a writer of fiction, Dana was an early practitioner of Gothic literature, particularly with his novel Paul Felton (1822), a tale of madness and murder. The novel has also been called a pioneering work of psychological realism alongside works by William Gilmore Simms. Dana had difficulty supporting his family through his writing, which earned him only $400 over 30 years.

Between 1838 and 1851, Dana earned a substantial income by offering education classes for women focused on English language literature and giving public lectures on topics including William Shakespeare in cities like Boston, Providence, New York, and Philadelphia.

After the death in 1843 of his friend Washington Allston, who also became his brother-in-law, he announced he would write a biography of the fellow writer, but it never was completed.

In 1849, he was elected into the National Academy of Design as an Honorary Academician.

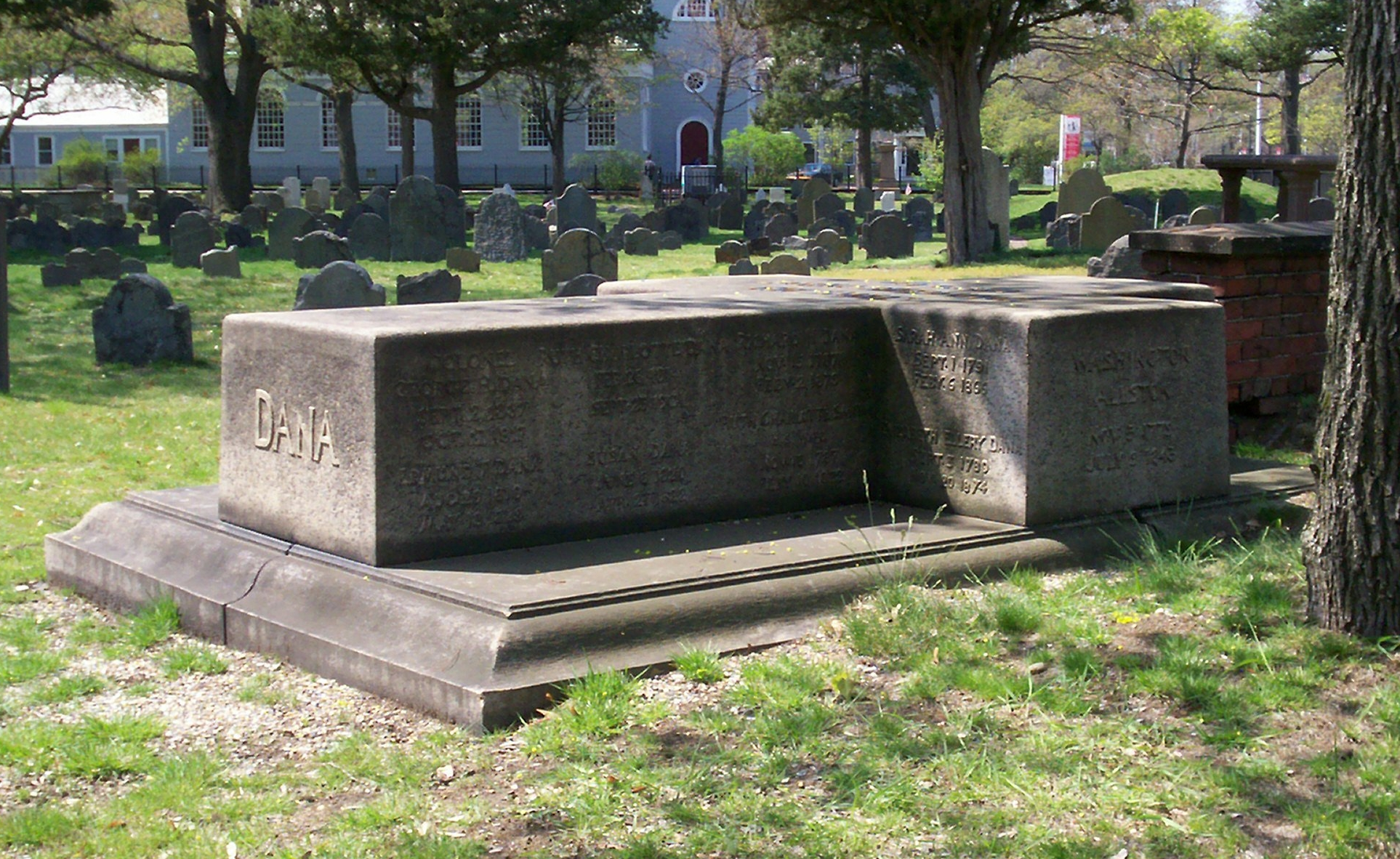
Dana family grave marker, Cambridge

Dana died at age 91 at his home at 43 Chestnut Street in Boston's Beacon Hill, where he had lived for more than 40 years, on February 2, 1879. He was buried in the family plot at the Old Burying Ground next to the First Parish in Cambridge. Henry Wadsworth Longfellow, whose daughter Edith married Dana's grandson Richard Henry Dana III in 1878, wrote a tribute to the elder writer after his death titled "The Burial of the Poet, Richard Henry Dana".

== Works ==
- An oration, delivered before the Washington benevolent society at Cambridge, July 4, 1814. Printed by Hilliard and Metcalf, 1814.
- The Idle Man. v.1 (1821-1822)
- Paul Felton (1822)
