= Peter Bulkley =

English and later American Puritan

The Reverend Peter Bulkeley
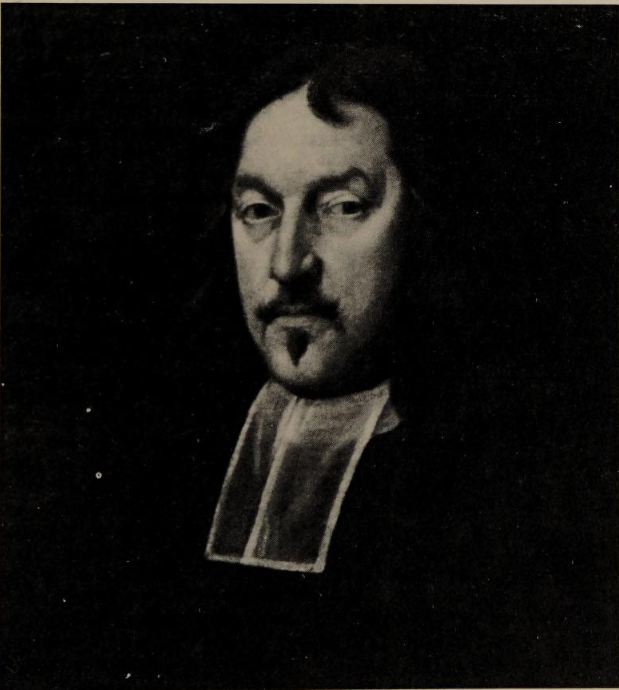
- portrait thought to be of Bulkley as rector of Odell, Bedfordshire
- Born: 31 January 1583; Odell, Bedfordshire, England
- Died: 9 March 1659 (aged 76); Concord, Massachusetts Bay Colony
- Other names: Peter Bulkeley could also be known by the names Peter Buckeley, Bulkley, and multiple others.
- Occupation: Puritan
- Known for: Founder of Concord, Massachusetts

Peter Bulkley (31 January 1583 – 9 March 1659, last name also spelled Bulkeley) was an influential early Puritan minister who left England for greater religious freedom in the American colony of Massachusetts. He was a founder of Concord, and was named by descendant Ralph Waldo Emerson in his poem about Concord, "Hamatreya".

== Early life ==
Bulkley was born in Odell, Bedfordshire, England, and admitted to St. John's College at Cambridge University at the age of sixteen, where he received several degrees. At one point he was even a Fellow of St. John's. After finishing his education, Bulkley succeeded his father as rector of Odell, 1610–1635. During this time Bulkley followed in his father's footsteps as a non-conformist. Finally in the 1630s there were increasing complaints about his preaching, and he was silenced by Archbishop Laud for his unwillingness to conform with the requirements of the Anglican Church.

In 1633, Charles I reissued the Declaration of Sports, an ecclesiastical declaration of allowed recreational activities on Sundays, with the stipulation that any minister unwilling to read from the pulpit should be removed, and Bulkley's sentiments, along with others in the Puritan movement, were against it. In 1634, Bulkley refused to wear a surplice or use the Sign of the Cross at a visitation for Archbishop William Laud. For this infraction he was ejected from the parish, at least temporarily.

== Career in America ==
Within the year he emigrated to New England, coming aboard the Susan and Ellen in 1635. He was ordained at Cambridge, Massachusetts, in April 1637, and "having carried a good number of planters with him into the woods", became the first minister in Musketaquid, later named Concord. He was "noted even among Puritans for the superlative stiffness of his Puritanism". In March 1638 during the Antinomian Controversy, he was one of the ministers who sat during the church trial of Anne Hutchinson, which resulted in her excommunication from the Boston church. In 1635, a group of settlers from Britain led by Rev. Peter Bulkley and Major Simon Willard negotiated a land purchase with the remnants of the local tribe. Bulkley was an influential religious leader who "carried a good number of planters with him into the woods"; Willard was a canny trader who spoke the Algonquian language and had gained the trust of Native Americans. Their six-square-mile purchase formed the basis of the new town, which was called "Concord" in appreciation of the peaceful acquisition.

He was known for his facility in Latin with both epigrams and poetry, with Cotton Mather praising the latter. As a writer, his book of Puritan sermons titled The Gospel Covenant, or the Covenant of Grace Opened, published in London in 1646, in which he appealed to "the people of New England," that they might "labor to shine forth in holiness above all other people", and evoked the City upon a Hill of John Winthrop. To historian Moses Coit Tyler, the "monumental book ... stands for the intellectual robustness of New England in the first age." It is considered one of the first books published in New England.

Bulkley served as moderator at a 1637 synod called in Cambridge due to what Emerson called the "errors" of Anne Hutchinson. According to "tradition", a council of Indians considering attacking the town of Concord held off because "Bulkley is there, the man of the big pray!" (This occurred during King Philip's War in 1675–6, after Peter was dead, and refers instead to his son Rev. Edward Bulkley.)

In 1643, he was the author and the first signer of a petition sent to Governor John Endecott in favor of Ambrose Martin, who was fined for speaking negatively towards the Puritan church and consequently met significant financial hardship.

Bulkley died in Concord.

== Personal life ==
Bulkley's first wife, Jane Allen, died in 1626. They had thirteen children:

- Edward, born 17 June 1614, at Odell, England
- Mary, baptized 24 August 1615; died in a few months
- Mary, baptized 1 November 1621
- Thomas, born 11 April 1617
- Nathaniel, born 29 November 1618; died at the age of 9
- John, born 17 February 1620
- Mary, born 1 Nov. 1621; died at the age of 3
- George, born 17 May 1623
- Daniel, born 28 August 1625
- Jabez, born 20 December 1626; died before the age of 3
- Joseph
- William
- Richard

After eight years as a widower, he married Grace Chetwood (or Chitwood); they had four more children:

- Gershom, born 6 December 1636
- Eliezer, probably born 1638
- Dorothy, born 16 August 1640
- Rev. Peter, born 12 August 1643

His oldest son, Edward, preceded him to the Colonies on a separate voyage as much as a year earlier, while records show that Rev. Peter sailed on the ship "Susan & Ellen" to New England in May 1635, with three of his sons by his first wife, Benjamin* (11), Daniel (9) and "Jo:" (15) "Buckley". Records show his second wife, Grace Bulkeley, sailed for New England on the "Elizabeth & Ann" at the same time. However, diary accounts of another passenger on the ship "Susan & Ellen," show that Grace actually accompanied her husband on the ship "Susan & Ellen" to New England. [*Note: the name "Benjamin" appears to be an alias used for one of his sons, since no primary source records exist of Benjamin's birth or subsequent activities in the Colonies.]

His son, Gershom, graduated Harvard in 1655 and married Sarah Chauncey, daughter of the president of Harvard, 26 October 1659. His grandson, the Honorable Peter Bulkeley, Esquire (son of Edward), born 3 January (11th month) 1640/41, died May 1688, married Rebecca Wheeler in 1667, was a Fellow of Harvard University, a Massachusetts Freeman (franchised voter), and a Commissioner of the United Colonies. The Hon. Peter Bulkeley is often confused with his uncle, the Rev. Peter (1643–1691), son of Rev. Peter Bulkeley by his second wife, Grace Chetwode, due to their close proximity in years of birth. As a matter of fact, the reference by Sibley has "merged" these two Peters into one entity, as examination of records, including those at Harvard University, will show.
