= Nathaniel Eaton =

First Headmaster of Harvard college

The Reverend Nathaniel Eaton

Headmaster of Harvard College
- In office 27 November 1637 – 9 September 1639
- Preceded by: Position established
- Succeeded by: Henry Dunster (as President)

Personal details
- Born: Before 17 September 1609 (baptism) Great Budworth, Cheshire, Kingdom of England
- Died: Before 11 May 1674 (burial) Southwark, Surrey, Kingdom of England
- Education: University of Cambridge; University of Padua

Nathaniel Eaton (before 17 September 1609 − before 11 May 1674) was an Anglican clergyman who was the first Headmaster of Harvard, President designate, and builder of Harvard's first College, Yard, and Library, in 1636.

Nathaniel was the uncle of Samuel Eaton, one of the seven founding members and signatories of the Harvard Corporation by charter in 1650.

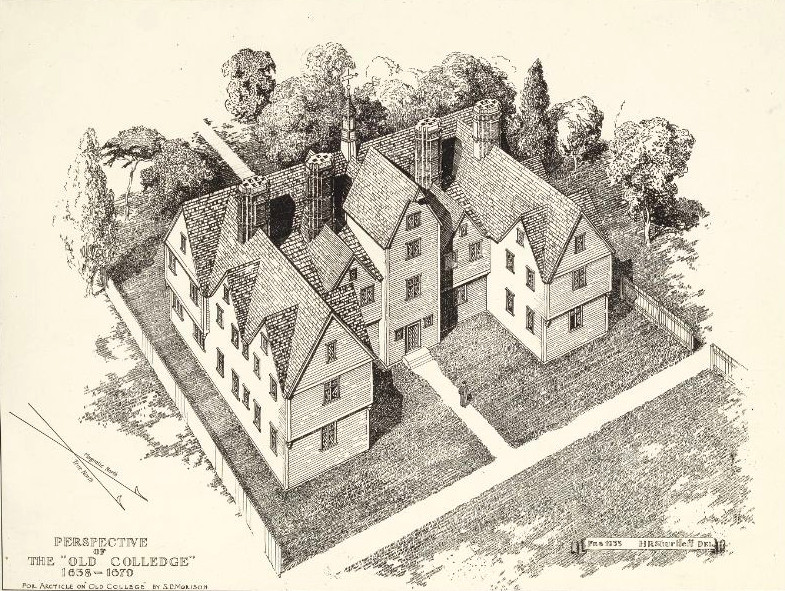
Harvard College's first building (1638–1670), as imagined by Samuel E. Morison

== Early life and education ==
The fifth or sixth son of the Reverend Richard Eaton (1565–1616), and Elizabeth [Okell]. Nathaniel was baptised in St Mary and All Saints' Church, Great Budworth, Cheshire, where his father was vicar, on 17 September 1609.

Eaton was educated at Westminster School, London. He attended Trinity College at the University of Cambridge, where he was a contemporary and friend of John Harvard, a student at Emmanuel College at the University of Cambridge.

He then attended the University of Franeker, where he studied under Rev. William Ames. Eaton later obtained a MD and PhD from the University of Padua, in Venetia.

== Career ==
In 1637, Eaton emigrated to the New England Colonies on the merchant ship Hector, and arrived in Boston on 26 June 1637 along with a party that included his older brothers, Theophilus and Samuel, and John Davenport.

=== Harvard College ===
In the fall of 1637, Eaton was appointed the first headmaster of the then-unnamed college which would later be named Harvard College, and was awarded 500 acres of land by the General Court of Massachusetts. He erected Harvard's first building, in 1636, called the Old College; named, fenced and planted the Harvard Yard called the College yard; established the colony's first printing press in March 1639, and created its first semi-public library, the Harvard Library.

Around the time that Eaton started teaching at Harvard, the Antinomian Controversy had erupted in the Massachusetts Bay Colony. The governor at the time, John Winthrop, was noted for his extreme stance within the Puritan community and was feared by many of the colonists. Even those who were Winthrop's close allies, such as Rev. Thomas Hooker, who cofounded the colony of Connecticut, were repulsed by his personality. As such, many left the colony and any Antinomians who didn't leave voluntarily were forced out, banished, or excommunicated (such as Rev. John Wheelwright who founded Exeter, New Hampshire, and his sister-in-law, Anne (Marbury) Hutchinson, who founded a new colony in what later became Rhode Island).

Eaton's older brother, Theophilus Eaton, led the group along with John Davenport as their religious leader. They intended to start their own settlement – probably due in part to the commanding persona of John Winthrop, Governor of the Massachusetts Bay Colony at the time (1637 to 1640, and many other terms). Winthrop was termed "an object of great fear in all the colonies," and caused the Rev. Thomas Hooker and others to go off and form their own colonies. Deciding that he didn't want to be involved in the animosity, he – like Rev. Thomas Hooker before him – founded a new colony, the colony of New Haven, though Winthrop and others begged both of them to stay.

In 1639, the year after Theophilus left, Eaton was brought before a court on allegations that he had beat his assistant Nathaniel Briscoe too harshly. According to John Winthrop's account, Briscoe had been hired by Eaton for less than three days when a dispute broke out. Eaton ordered others to hold Briscoe in place while he beat him with "200 stripes" using a walnut tree branch that Winthrop describes as "large enough to have killed a horse". The court also heard a number of other complaints, including that he would beat students with "20 to 30 lashes at a time" and that his wife had supposedly served students hasty pudding with goat dung in it as a substitute for raisins. As a result, Eaton was ordered to step down from his position and pay a fine. The school was subsequently closed the next academic year. The only record of Eaton's own supposed confession was destroyed in a suspicious fire in the office of the historian James Savage (1784–1873), and the full extent of his guilt remains in doubt.

It is through the court case that we know that Eaton owned a slave referred to as "The Moor", in what is the earliest known record of slavery in Cambridge, Massachusetts. During the trial students of Harvard complained about being served the same food as "The Moor". At that time, the term "Moor" was used as a blanket term covering all of the inhabitants of North Africa, including Black and Muslim peoples. It is possible that "The Moor" had arrived a year earlier on the slave ship Desire.

Henry Dunster succeeded Eaton in 1640 as Harvard's first president, and the first students graduated in 1642. Dunster resigned in 1654 over disagreements with the church about infant baptism. Around the same time, he was excommunicated from the congregation in Cambridge, Massachusetts. In 1640, Eaton moved to the Colony of Virginia, and then sent for his wife and children who left New England, except for his two year old son Benoni.

=== Family lost at sea ===
According to Winthrop's History of New England, the ship in which the family traveled disappeared without a trace. His only remaining child, Benoni Eaton, had been left in Cambridge under the care of Thomas Chesholm and his wife, Isobel; Thomas was steward of Harvard College from 1650 to 1660. Through Benoni, Nathaniel has modern descendants.

Following the loss of his family, Eaton married the widow Anne (Graves) Cotton (1620–1684), the daughter of Captain Thomas Graves (1584–1635) of Virginia, becoming the brother-in-law of William Stone, the governor of the Province of Maryland, and family members with future Founding Fathers Thomas Stone and Daniel of St. Thomas Jenifer.

Eaton served for several years as an assistant to the Anglican curate at Accomac, Virginia before returning to England, where he was appointed vicar of Bishop's Castle, Shropshire, in 1661 and rector of Bideford, Devon, in 1668.

In 1647, Eaton was exonerated of a £100 debt that Winthrop misstated as being for £1,000 in his History of New England, and with which Eaton had supposedly absconded to Virginia in 1640. The exoneration is documented in Henry Dunster's record book for Harvard College as a copy of a letter by two benefactors that Dunster recorded directly underneath his first design of the seal of Harvard College. The 1640 endowment letter was footnoted in 1647 by Theophilus, who wrote:

This money was put wholey into the hands of my brother Nath:Eaton. 9 August 1647. [signed] Theo:Eaton.

The intention of the footnote was to indicate that his brother had finally been repaid, and apparently Nathaniel had in part used the money to further his education. As for the £100, Thomas Symonds , a carpenter who apparently assisted in the building of the college at Cambridge in 1639 and afterwards. was found to be in debt to one of the college's creditors, John Cogan, for the same amount. The college building was poorly erected, and Symonds was the responsible party after Eaton left. Symonds and at least one of his assistants were ultimately incarcerated in debtor's prison.

== Religious convictions ==
Eaton left for England around 1652, where he had already been accepted back by the Church of England and honoured as a parish priest, though obviously he had his scruples, and was said to waver between devotion to his newly found home and that to his former.

In all likelihood, that "back and forthedness" and covering up set up a scenario of confusion, which seems to have confused every recordkeeper involved. Eaton died in 1674 in King's Bench Prison, where he had been incarcerated for a similar debt: quite probably the same £100 debt from which he had already been given relief. His imprisonment coincided with the Stuart Restoration, and was likely reposted on an old list that King Charles II's father had kept concerning those of lingering or questionable indebtedness. He was given a burial service on 11 May 1674 at St George the Martyr, Southwark, Surrey, England.

== Confusion with Nathaniel Heaton of Boston ==
There was also Nathaniel (H)eaton, Heaten, wife, Elizabeth and children, who emigrated on the Griffin with William and Anne Marbury Hutchinson landing on 18 September 1634 in the town of Boston, but who spelled his name "Heaton". This Nathaniel Heaten was made free on 25 May 1636. Nathaniel Eaton of this article only arrived on the Hector on 28 June 1637, and was made a Freeman on 9 June 1638. In 1903 a series of plans of Boston, showing existing ways and owners of property from 25 December 1630 to 25 December 1645 inclusive was published showing the work of cartographer, George Lamb. In these maps #98, Nathaniel Eaton is cited as a property owner in Boston from 1638 to 1645. The subject of this article, Nathaniel Eaton, was known to have left Cambridge in the fall of 1639 and relocated to Virginia by 1640. The Nathaniel Eaton cited in the Lamb map collection is most likely Nathaniel Heaton. This error may have caused further conflation of two individuals, Nathaniel Heaton (Boston), and Nathaniel Eaton (Cambridge). In The Crooked and Narrow Streets of the Town of Boston – 1630–1822 [note 185] by Annie Haven Thwing, Nathaniel Heaton is accurately cited.

== Notes ==
1. Cf. Samuel Eliot Morison Builders of the Bay Colony (1930) pp 190–191 where can be found his wife's supposed confession that was obviously coerced. Allegations of embezzlement appear to be ex post facto, or after the fact, and when one compares the entries in: Thomas Lechford's Note Book Kept by Thomas Lechford Lawyer, 1638–1641 (1885), it can be seen that Nathaniel paid all his debts, and was even owed money by Thomas Lechford himself.

2. Cf. Nathaniel B. Shurtleff, M.D. Records of the Governor and Company of the Massachusetts Bay in New England (1853, vol I) p. 275; and subsequent later trials such as the Salem Witch Trials where it can be seen that testimonies at trial, etc., were thereafter taken down.

3. According to Cotton Mather's Magnalia Christi Americana (1702), the graduating class of 1642 included the following individuals:

Benjamin Woodbridge
Georgius [George] Downing
Johannes Bulklæus [John Bulkeley]
Gulielmus [William] Hubbard
Samuel Bellingham
Johannes Wilsonus [John Wilson]
Henricus [Henry] Saltonstall
Tobias Barnardus [Barnard]
Nathanael Brusterus [Nathaniel Brewster]

4. James Savage, Winthrop's Journal "The History of New England" 1630–1649 (1825–26 edition). There are other versions, including the original 1649 version, but Savage's annotated edition, or its 1853 revision, is considered to be the most comprehensive.

5. Many spelling variations exist, such as "Greaves" for "Graves". Some authorities state that Ann was the daughter of Francis Graves, the son of Thomas Graves. She later married Francis Doughty as her third and final husband.

== Sources ==
- James Kendall Hosmer, editor, Winthrop's Journal 'The History of New England' 1630–1649 (1908 edition) vol. I, p. 314 — Appeal by the Church of Cambridge and the seizing of Nathaniel Eaton's estate. See also: James Savage's footnotes in his edited version of the same above Winthrop's Journal 'The History of New England' 1630–1649 (1825–26 edition)
- Nathaniel Bradstreet Shurtleff, M.D., editor, Records of the Governor and Company of the Massachusetts Bay in New England (1853, vol. I) [1628–1641] by page...

p. 210 – [Eaton] left out of tax rate for 1637 on 20 November 1637 – Nathaniel Bradstreet (1853). Records of the governor and company of the Massachusetts Bay in New England. Printed by order of the legislature, Vol. 1. Boston: W. White. p. 210.
p. 262 – 500 acres [2 km²] of land granted on 6 June 1639 vis-à-vis: "If hee continew his employment wth vs for his life".
p. 275 – Removed from employment on 9 September 1639
p. 275 – Judgements henceforth, after the Eaton Trial, to "bee recorded in a booke, to bee kept to posterity".

(Same day as above: 9 September 1639, and written in after the above "deposition" event. It's probable that the "deposition" was a "first order of business", and not just something anticipated long before "recordation of facts" had even been conceived.)

p. 277 – His estate attached on 5 November 1639
p. 372 – Nathaniell Heaten made free on 25 May 1636 (this is an example of the incorrect conflagration of two distinctly separate individuals, Nathaniel (H)Eaton and Nathaniel Eaton) The Nathaniel Eaton of this article had not yet arrive in the Massachusetts Bay. He arrived on the Hector on 26 June 1637, as detailed above.
p. 374 – Nathaniel Eaton Made a Freeman on 9 June 1638

- Thomas Lechford, Note Book Kept by Thomas Lechford Lawyer, 1638–1641 (1885) p. 236

"I payd Nathaniel Heaton for full of writings & cutting wood. 31 November 1639. 5s". (This is another example incorrectly citing Nathaniel Heaton!)

- Cotton Mather, Magnalia Christi Americana (The Ecclesiastical History of New England) (1702) [7 books; 2 volumes in modern versions]
- John Warren Barber, Connecticut Historical Collections (1837 edition) pp 134–185
- Benjamin Trumbull, D.D., A Complete History of Connecticut (1818) [Also, 2 volumes]
- New England Historical and Genealogical Register (1855, vol. 9) pp 269–271, article entitled "The First President of Harvard College"
- James D. & Georgiana W. Kornwolf, Architecture and Town Planning in Colonial North America (2002) vol 2, pp. 981–986 [Harvard College]

(all preceding dates are in their original Julian Calendar format)

Academic offices
Preceded by New position	Schoolmaster of Harvard College; 1637–1639	Succeeded by Henry Dunster, as President of Harvard College
