= Henry Dunster =

Anglo-American Puritan clergyman and the first president of Harvard College

The Reverend Henry Dunster

1st President of Harvard College
- In office August 27, 1640 – October 24, 1654
- Preceded by: Nathaniel Eaton (as Headmaster)
- Succeeded by: Charles Chauncy

Personal details
- Born: November 1609 Bury, Lancashire, England
- Died: February 27, 1659 (aged 49) Scituate, Massachusetts

Henry Dunster (November 26, 1609 (baptized) – February 27, 1658/59) was a New England Puritan clergyman who served as the first president of Harvard College from 1640 to 1654. Brackney says Dunster was "an important precursor" of the Baptist denomination in America, especially regarding infant baptism, soul freedom, religious liberty, congregational governance, and a radical biblicism.

== Life ==
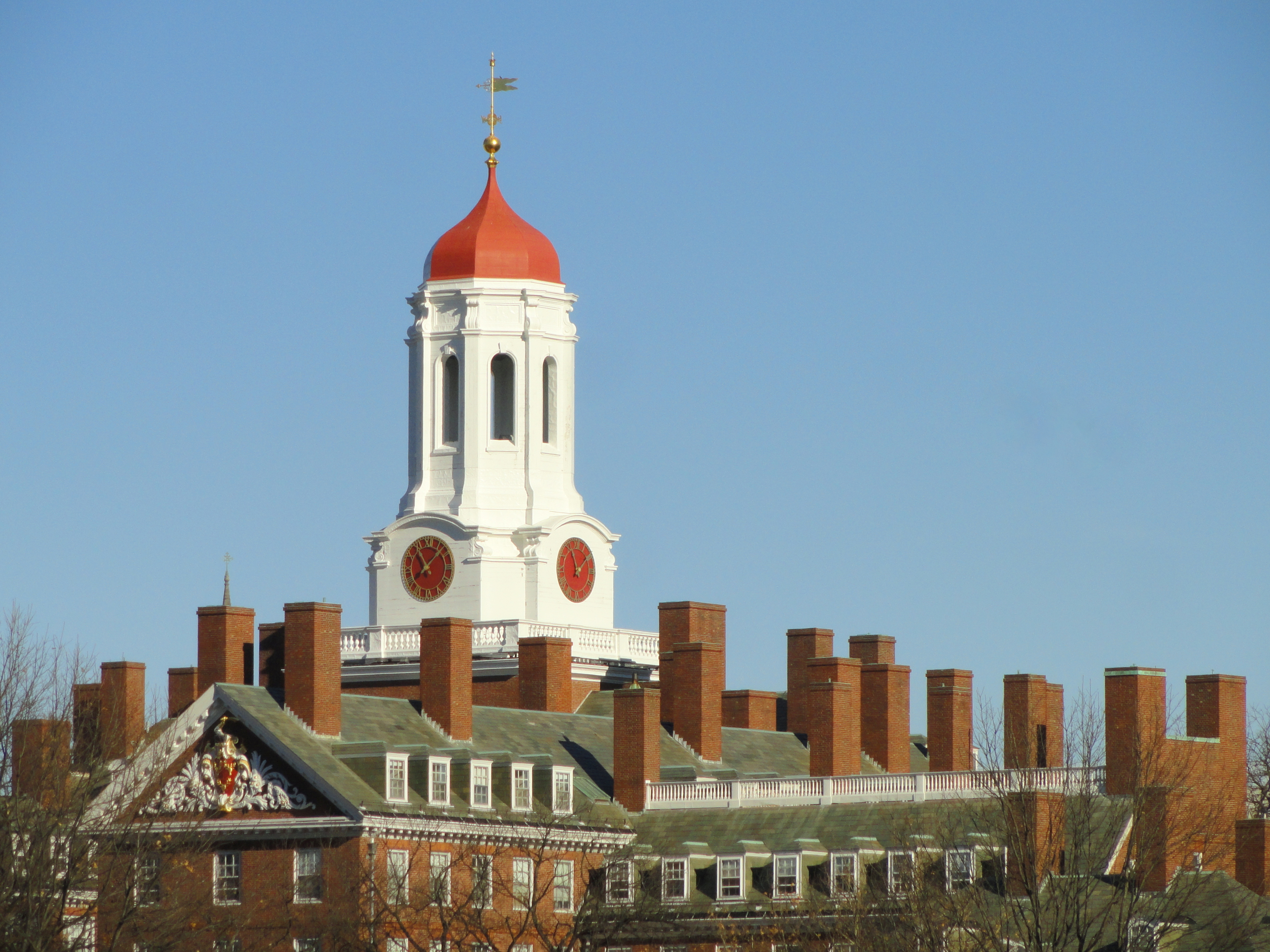
Dunster House, constructed at Harvard in 1930, is named for Dunster

He was born at Bolholt near Bury, Lancashire, England.

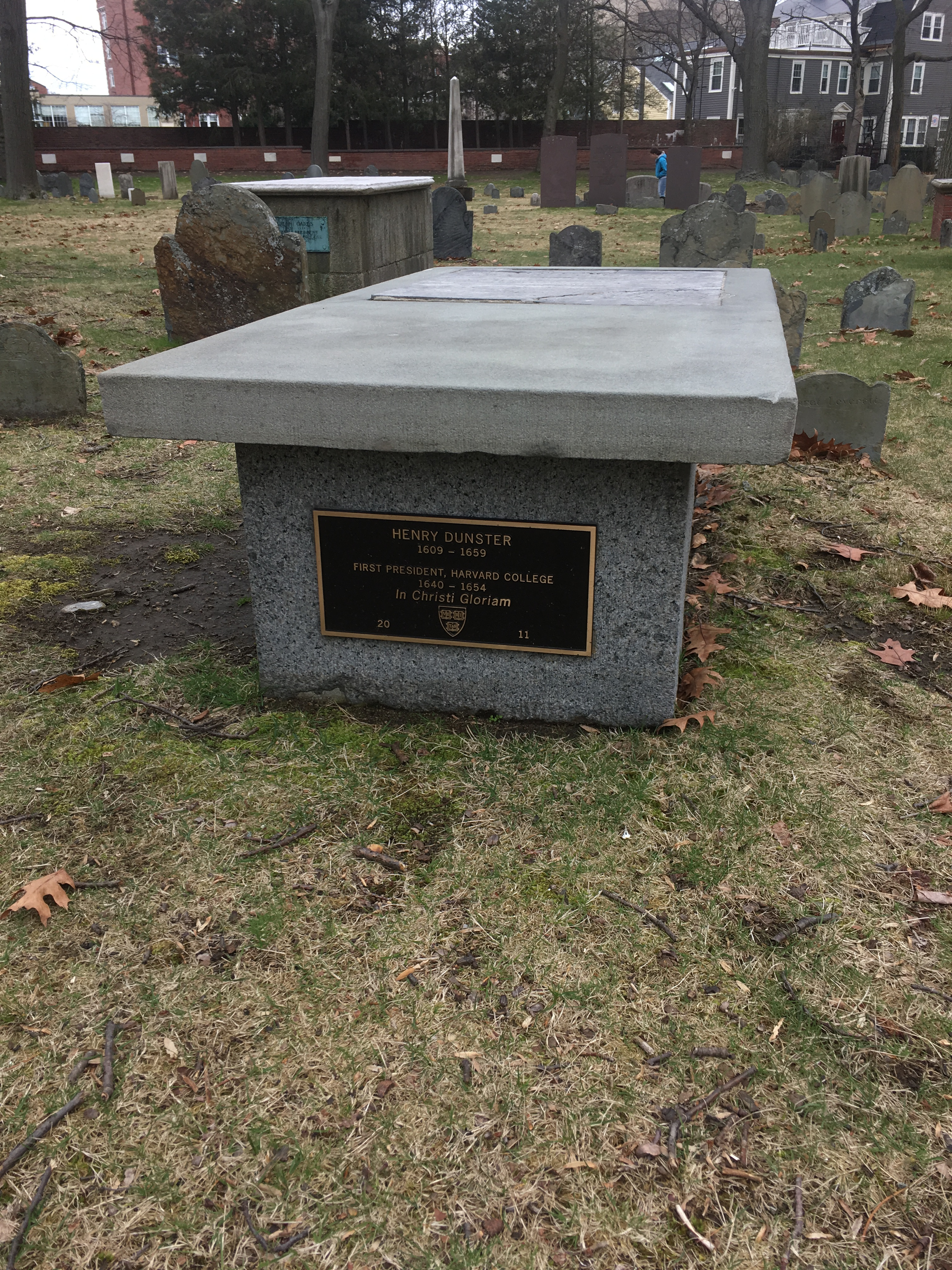
Dunster's grave

Dunster studied at Magdalene College, Cambridge, as a sizar, specializing in oriental languages and earning a reputation as a Hebrew scholar. He earned a bachelor's degree (1630) and his M.A. (1634). He served as headmaster of Bury Grammar School and was a curate at the Church of St Mary the Virgin, Bury.

Sponsored by Rev. Richard Mather, Dunster immigrated to Boston, Massachusetts, in 1640. Nathaniel Eaton was fired in 1639 as master of the recently established Harvard College, in Cambridge, Massachusetts, and Dunster was appointed as his successor. On August 27, 1640 Dunster became the first president of Harvard. At Dunster's alma mater, Magdalene College, the presiding officer was called the master and his second the president. Some have speculated that he borrowed the term out of a sense of humility, considering himself only a temporary place-holder.

Dunster modeled Harvard's educational system on that of England, including Eton College and the University of Cambridge. He set up as well as taught Harvard's entire curriculum alone for many years, graduating the first college class in America, the Class of 1642. From 1649 to 1650 Dunster, also served as interim pastor at the First Parish in Cambridge until the accession of Jonathan Mitchel.

Historians have generally treated Dunster well in terms of his theological beliefs and educational abilities. Samuel Eliot Morison, the best-known historian of Harvard's history, wrote that Harvard College "might have followed her first patron to an early death and oblivion but for the faith, courage and intelligence of Henry Dunster." Dunster held Harvard together financially during a difficult economic downturn in New England that began soon after his arrival. He later had some conflict with the college's treasurer, Thomas Danforth, who called him the "de facto treasurer." However, Dunster indeed was the "de facto treasurer" of Harvard for nearly a decade. With the approval of the General Court of Massachusetts Bay, he later set up the first corporation charter in America, the Charter of 1650, and named Danforth as the new treasurer. The corporate charter that Dunster established governs Harvard University to this day, and was only altered in 2010, when the Harvard Corporation expanded from a body of seven members, as first set up by Dunster, to thirteen members.

When Dunster abandoned the Puritan view of infant baptism in favor of believer's baptism in 1653/54, he provoked a controversy that highlighted two distinct approaches to dealing with dissent in the Massachusetts Bay Colony. The colony's Puritan leaders, whose own religion was born of dissent from the mainstream Church of England, generally worked for reconciliation with members who questioned matters of Puritan theology but responded much more harshly to outright rejection of Puritanism. Dunster's conflict with the colony's magistrates began when he failed to have his infant son baptized, believing that only adults should be baptized. Earnest efforts to restore Dunster to Puritan orthodoxy failed, and his heterodoxy proved untenable to colony leaders who had entrusted him, in his job as Harvard's president, to uphold the colony's religious mission. Thus, he represented a threat to the stability of society. Dunster exiled himself in 1654/55 and moved to nearby Plymouth Colony to become the minister of the First Church in Scituate, Massachusetts. Dunster died there in 1658 or 1659.

== Family and legacy ==
Dunster married twice; both his wives were named Elizabeth. His first wife was Elizabeth Glover, the owner of the first and only printing press in the colonies. They married on June 21, 1641. She died in 1643, leaving Dunster with land and property, including the printing press. Dunster married Elizabeth Atkinson (1627–1690) in 1644. Together they had five children.

Dunster House, one of the twelve residential houses of Harvard University, is named after Henry Dunster.

== Bibliography ==
- Dunster, Henry, 1609-1659? Papers of Henry Dunster and the Dunster and Glover families : an inventory
- Samuel Dunster, Henry Dunster and His Descendants (1876) [exhaustive biography by a direct descendant, cf. especially pp. 1–19]
- Samuel Eliot Morison, Builders of the Bay Colony (1930) [chapter entitled "Henry Dunster, President of Harvard", pp. 183–216]
- William Thaddeus Harris, Epitaphs From the Old Burying Ground in Cambridge (1845) p. 169 [Henry Dunster, "d. 2.27.1658"]
- Henry Fitz-Gilbert Waters. The New England historical and genealogical register, Volume 61, New England Historic Genealogical Society
- Melnick, Arseny James, America's Oldest Corporation and First CEO: Harvard and Henry Dunster (2008)

Academic offices
Preceded by Nathaniel Eaton, as Schoolmaster of Harvard College	President of Harvard College; 1640–1654	Succeeded by Charles Chauncy
