= Nehemiah Walter =

Irish-born American clergyman

- Born: December 1663; Youghal
- Died: 17 September 1750 (aged 86–87)
- Alma mater: Harvard University
- Occupation: Minister
- Children: Nathaniel Walter, Hannah Trowbridge

Nehemiah Walter (December 1663 in Youghal, County Cork, Ireland – 17 September 1750 in Roxbury, Boston, British Colonial America) was a clergyman. He came with his father, Thomas, to the American colonies in 1679, settling in the Boston area. He was graduated at Harvard in 1684. After living for a time in Nova Scotia, he became a colleague to John Eliot, the "apostle to the Indians". He was minister of Roxbury, Massachusetts from 17 October 1688 until his death.

Walter married a daughter of Increase Mather. He published The body of death anatomized: A brief essay concerning the sorrows and the desires of the regenerate, upon their sense of indwelling sin (Boston, 1707); Practical Discourses on the Holiness of Heaven (1726); and a posthumous volume of Sermons on Isaiah LV (1755).
