= Nathaniel Chauncey =

American minister (1681–1756)

The Reverend Nathaniel Chauncey

Personal life
- Born: September 21, 1681 Hatfield, then part of Massachusetts Bay Colony
- Died: February 1, 1756 (aged 74) Durham, then part of Connecticut Colony
- Education: Yale College (BA, MA)
- Occupation: Minister

Religious life
- Religion: Christianity
- Church: Congregational Church

Nathaniel Chauncey (September 21, 1681 – February 1, 1756) was an American Congregationalist minister. He became the first person to receive a degree from Yale College in 1702. His degrees were conferred solely upon examination.

During the First Great Awakening, Chauncey was a leading Old Light who defended the established order of the Connecticut churches under the Saybrook Platform against the itinerant revivalism of George Whitefield and his followers. He initiated the disciplinary proceedings brought against ministers including Eleazar Wheelock. He served as a fellow of Yale College from 1746 to 1752.

== Early life and education ==
Chauncey was born in Hatfield, a town in the interior of the Massachusetts Bay Colony, in 1681. He was the fifth child and third son of Abigail Strong and Nathaniel Chauncey, a Puritan (Congregationalist) church minister from Hatfield. His grandfather, Charles Chauncy, was a minister who served as the second president of Harvard College.

His father died when he was four years old, and he was raised by his uncle Israel Chauncey in Stratford, a town in the Connecticut Colony. Israel became one of the founders and first trustees of Yale College and educated Nathaniel on theology using his father's own library.

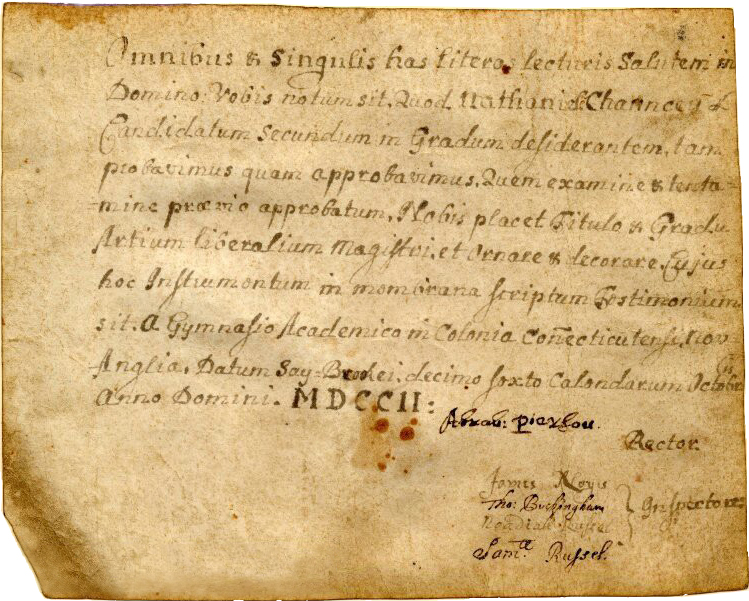
First diploma from Yale College in 1702

On September 16, 1702, he received a Bachelor of Arts and Master of Arts solely by standing examination at the Collegiate School, becoming the first person to receive a degree from what later became Yale University. His diploma was signed by Abraham Pierson, the first rector of the college, on December 16 and approved by three ministers including Samuel Russell, a co-founder of the college.

== Career ==
Chauncey joined the church in Stratford on January 16, 1698. After receiving a degree from Yale, he taught for three months at the Hopkins Grammar School in Hadley, Massachusetts over the winter of 1702 before teaching at the grammar school in Springfield for six months.

He began preaching in Durham, a new settlement in the Connecticut Colony, soon after. In his diary, he wrote "I commenced preaching at Durham, the second time" on May 23, 1706. He preached in the church starting December 1710, a year after a meeting house was built. Because a number of settlers were dissatisfied with his beliefs on church discipline, he was not ordained until February 17, 1711. He became the first minister of the church in Durham, later called the First Church of Christ and now part of the United Churches of Durham.

A biography in The College Courant by Hon. Ralph D. Smith in 1868 stated:

Though small in stature he was dignified, and rather imperious in his bearing. His principal fault was a rigid austerity, and a severe, and, at times, an almost vindictive treatment of those who differed from him in opinions. He was the leader of the old light, or conservative school, of...theology.

He was an Old Light Congregationalist who strongly opposed the revivalist preaching of George Whitefield during the First Great Awakening, favoring the traditional, orderly theology of New England Puritanism. The consociation trials of New Light ministers such as Eleazar Wheelock, Benjamin Pomeroy, Philemon Robbins, and Timothy Allen were set in motion by Chauncey. He remained an influential figure during his lifetime.

He was a fellow of Yale College from 1746 to 1752. The Yale University Library contains his election sermons preached in 1709 and 1734, and a discourse entitled "The true way of singing the Songs of the Lord". He published sermons in 1719 and 1734.

Chauncey died in Durham on February 1, 1756, aged 74. Two sermons were preached at his eulogy. He was buried in the Old Durham Cemetery.

== Personal life ==
He married Sarah Judson on October 12, 1708. She was the daughter of Capt. James Judson of Stratford. His third daughter, Abigail Chauncey (1717–1768), married Jabez Hamlin, an early settler of Middletown, Connecticut, and later colonel in the American Revolutionary War. His son, also named Nathaniel Chauncey, graduated from Yale in 1740 and was a justice of the peace in Cromwell, Connecticut.
