= Ambrose Martin =

Ambrose Martin was one of the first settlers of the early colonial town of Concord, Massachusetts. While living there, he was fined 10 pounds, a large sum for the time, for speaking out against the Puritan church covenant, stating that it was "a stinking carrion and a human invention," thus being part of one of the first recorded instances of the censure of free speech in colonial America, a freedom that later became a pillar of the United States Constitution. Martin had been unable to pay the fine in cash, so authorities seized a cow from his property and sold it for 20 pounds. The difference of 10 pounds was due to Martin, but he refused to accept it, maintaining he be repaid either the entire sum of the fine or nothing at all.

Years later, when Martin and his family became financially distressed, a petition was drafted and delivered to Governor John Endecott in 1643 to return to Martin the amount of his fine. The petition was written by Reverend Peter Bulkley, and signed by Reverend John Jones and thirteen heads of families: Richard Griffin, Simon Willard, Robert Merriam, Thomas Wheeler, George Wheeler, Robert Fletcher, Luke Potter, Joseph Wheeler, Thomas Foxe, William Busse, Henry Farwell, James Hosmer, and John Graves. On April 5, 1644, Endecott answered the petition, stating that the whole sum of 20 pounds would not be returned, however Martin was still entitled to the difference of 10 pounds, which he never claimed.
