= John Rogers (Harvard) =

5th president of Harvard College

The Reverend John Rogers
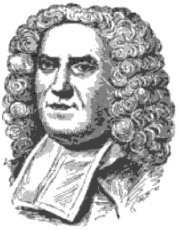

5th President of Harvard College
- In office April 10, 1682 – July 12, 1684
- Preceded by: Urian Oakes
- Succeeded by: Increase Mather (acting)

Personal details
- Born: January 11, 1630 Coggeshall, Essex, England
- Died: July 12, 1684 (aged 54) Cambridge, Massachusetts Bay Colony, British America

John Rogers (January 11, 1630 – July 12, 1684) was an English Puritan minister, and academic who served as the fifth president of Harvard College from 1682 to 1684.

== Early life and education ==
Rogers was born in Coggeshall, England, the eldest son of minister Nathaniel Rogers. In 1636, he immigrated to New England with his family. In 1649, at age 19, he earned a B.A. from Harvard College which, only seven years earlier, in 1642, had graduated its first class of students. In 1652, following an additional three years of study, he received an M.A. and, in 1660, married Elizabeth Denison of Ipswich, Massachusetts.

== Career ==
Residing in Ipswich and, despite neither having been ordained as a minister or trained as a physician, Rogers practiced medicine and assisted in the ministry of his brother-in-law, local historian William Hubbard, who served as Ipswich pastor for over 50 years.

=== Harvard College president ===
In 1682, Rogers was appointed President of Harvard, following the death of Urian Oakes. Rogers was not the first choice as successor by the Governing Board of Harvard; first choice Cotton Mather could not be released from his pastoral obligations, and a second choice declined, prior to Rogers accepting the position.

Puritan minister and author Cotton Mather, Rogers was "sweet-tempered...genuinely pious and a accomplished gentleman given to long winded daily prayers." American historian Samuel Eliot Morison says that Rogers would have "made a successful president", but he only held the position for two years, prior to his sudden death at the age of 54. He was buried at Old Burying Ground in Cambridge, Massachusetts.

Academic offices
Preceded by Urian Oakes	President of Harvard College; 1682–1684	Succeeded by Increase Mather, acting
