= Henry Pickering Walcott =

American physician

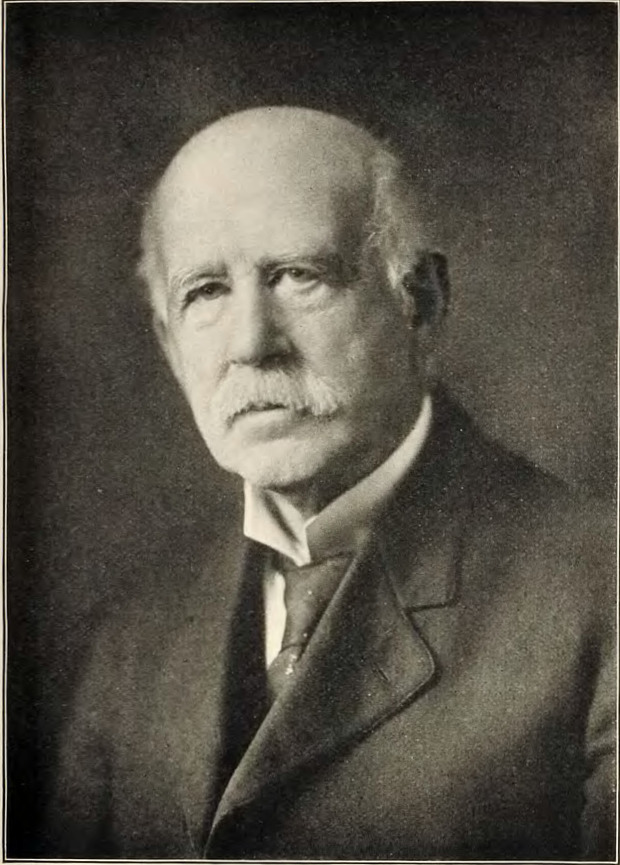
- Born: December 23, 1838
- Died: November 11, 1932 (aged 93)
- Occupation: Medical doctor

Henry Pickering Walcott (December 23, 1838, in Hopkinton, Massachusetts – November 11, 1932) was an American physician who served as a director of the State Health Board, president of the American Public Health Association, president of the American Academy of Arts and Sciences, and twice as acting president of Harvard University.

Walcott was the son of Samuel Baker Walcott, a lawyer. He attended Salem Latin School and Harvard College, graduating in 1858. In 1861 he graduated from Bowdoin College with a medical degree (M.D.) and then studied in Berlin and Vienna Beginning in 1862 he practiced in Cambridge, Massachusetts. In 1865 he married Charlotte Elizabeth. The couple had two sons.

From 1881 Henry Pickering Walcott belonged to the State Health Board and from 1886 he was its director. In 1900/1901 and again in 1905 he was acting president of Harvard University.

Walcott was president of the American Public Health Association (APHA) in 1896, and in 1904 the Massachusetts Horticultural Society. In 1889 he was elected into the American Academy of Arts and Sciences, and was later president from 1915 to 1917. In 1907 he received an honorary doctorate from Yale University, and in 1927 from Harvard University.

The Harvard Museum has an oil painting of him by Charles Sydney Hopkinson.
