= Urian Oakes =

English-born American minister and educator

The Reverend Urian Oakes
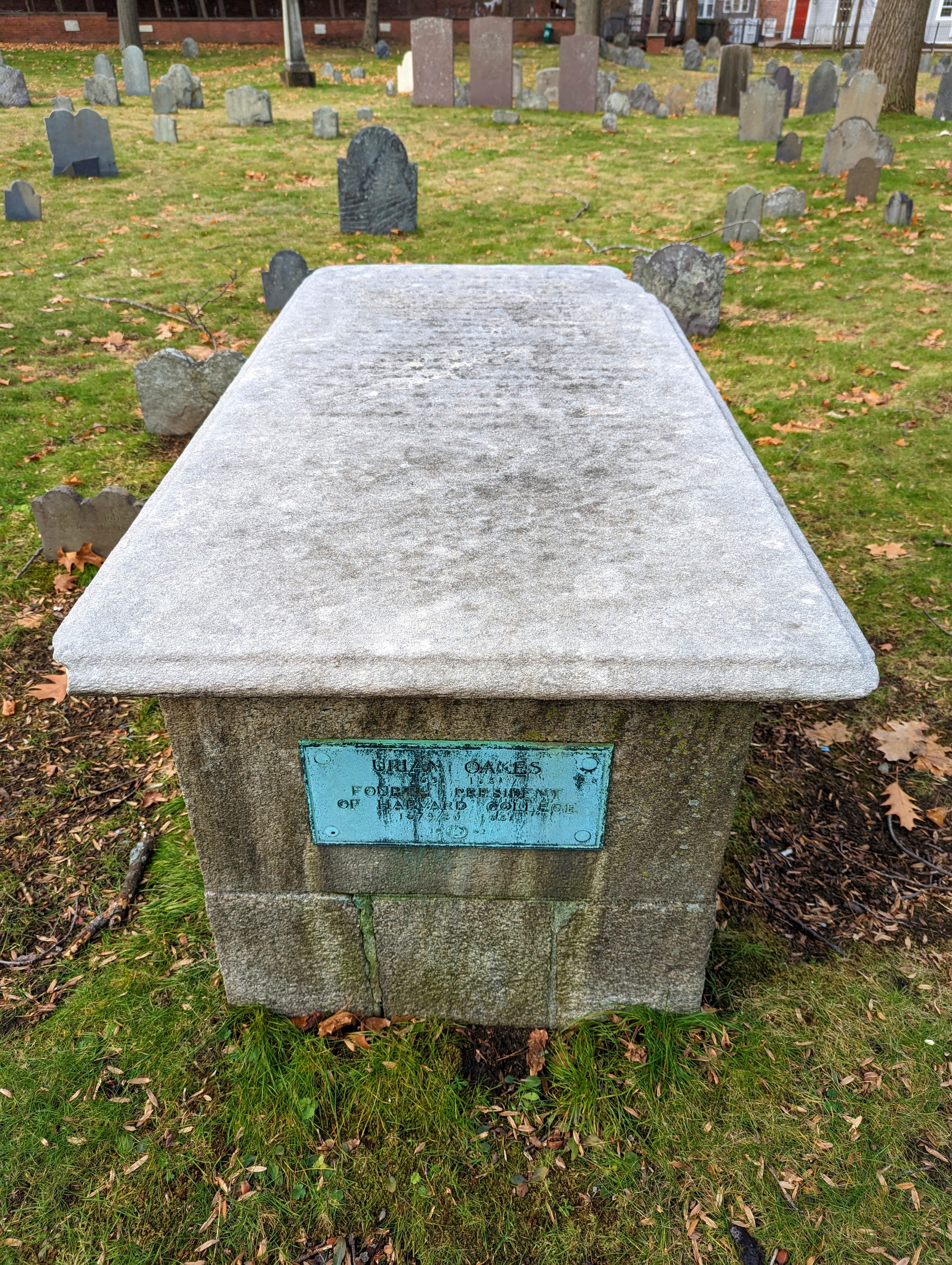

4th President of Harvard College
- In office April 7, 1675 (Note: Acting: April 7, 1675 – February 2, 1680) – July 25, 1681
- Preceded by: Leonard Hoar
- Succeeded by: John Rogers

Personal details
- Born: 1631 England
- Died: July 25, 1681 (aged 49–50) Cambridge, Province of Massachusetts Bay, British America

Urian Oakes (1631 – July 25, 1681) was an English-born American Congregational minister and educator who served as the fourth president of Harvard College from 1675 to 1681.

== Early life ==
The son of Edward and Jane Oakes, he was born in England in 1631 or 1632, and went with his father to Massachusetts in 1640. Thomas Oakes was his brother. He graduated at Harvard College in 1649 and taught there for four years, until he decided to return to England.

Oakes returned to England during the time of the Commonwealth, and became a minister at Titchfield. He was one of many clergymen ejected from their living in 1662 as a result of the Act of Uniformity. Oakes found work as a schoolteacher and nonconformist minister. He also married Ruth Ames; she died in 1669.

== Connection with Harvard ==
In 1671 a deputation, sent to England to find a minister for the vacant church of Cambridge, Massachusetts, chose Oakes. He took up the post in November 1671, and soon after he became one of the governors of Harvard College. Leonard Hoar became President of Harvard in 1672, but was disliked by many, including some of the governors, among them Oakes. He and other of his colleagues resigned, and, in spite of the efforts of the general court of overseers, would not withdraw their resignation till Hoar himself vacated the presidency on 15 March 1675. The vacancy created was filled by the appointment of Oakes. He, however, would only accept it provisionally; but after discharging the duties of the office for four years, he in 1679 accepted the full appointment in form, and held it till his death in Cambridge on July 25, 1681.

Calamy states that Oakes was noted for 'the uncommon sweetness of his temper,' and in New England he was greatly beloved by his congregation and popular with all who came in contact with him.

== Legacy ==
He was known as a preacher and Latinist. His extant writings are three sermons - two preached at the annual election of the artillery company in 1672 and 1676, and the third at the election of representatives in 1673 - and a monody in English verse (Cambridge, 1677) on the death of Thomas Shepard, minister of the church in Charlestown.

== Family ==
He married Ruth Ames (1635 – 1669) and they had four children.

His daughter Hannah Oakes (1659-1714) married Samuel Angier (1655-1719) (grandson of William Ames) and they had 13 children.

== Publications ==
- The Victorious Christian Soldier in Christ’s Army
- The Sovereign Efficacy of Divine Providence

== Notes ==
Academic offices
Preceded by Leonard Hoar	President of Harvard College; 1675–1680, acting 1680–1681	Succeeded by John Rogers
