= Bolholt =

Area of Bury, Greater Manchester, England

Coordinates: 53.599°N 2.331°W

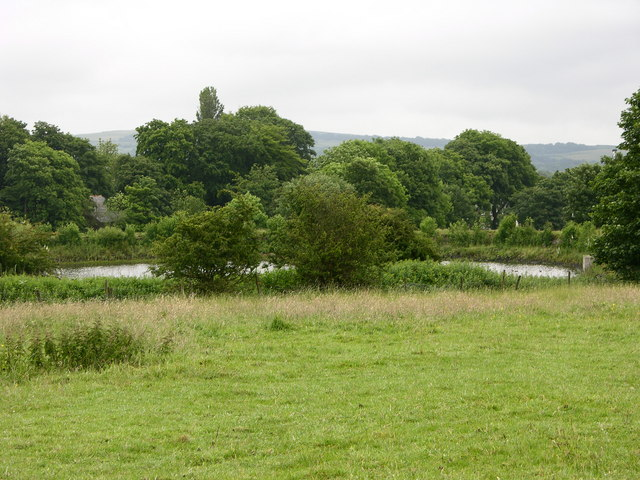
- Bolholt Reservoir

- Location within Greater Manchester
- OS grid reference: SD780114
- Metropolitan borough: Bury
- Metropolitan county: Greater Manchester
- Region: North West
- Country: England
- Sovereign state: United Kingdom
- Post town: BURY
- Postcode district: BL8
- Dialling code: 0161
- Police: Greater Manchester
- Fire: Greater Manchester
- Ambulance: North West
- UK Parliament: Bury North

Bolholt is an area of Bury in Greater Manchester, England.
