= Increase Mather =

Puritan minister, academic and activist (1639–1723)

The Reverend Increase Mather
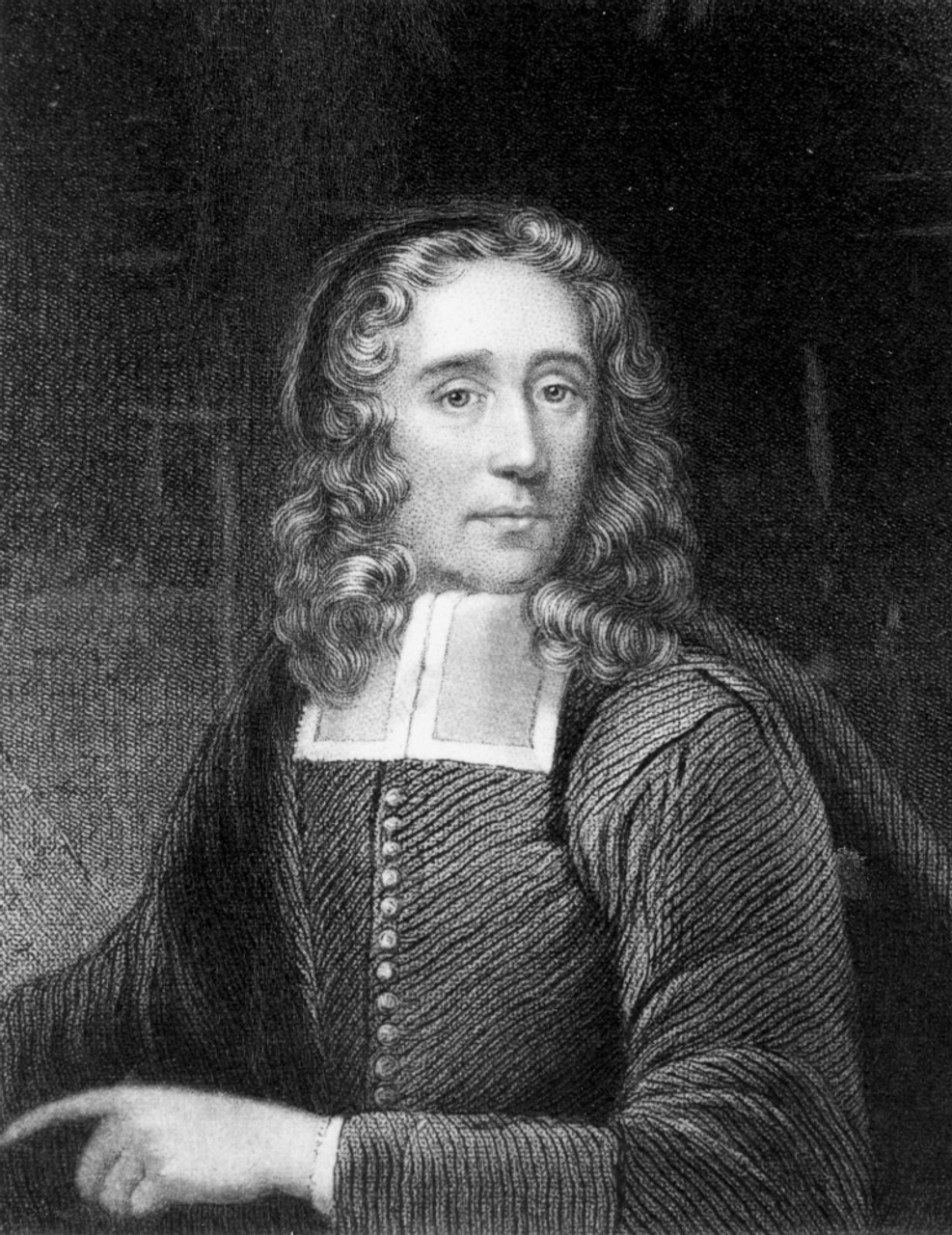
- Engraving, c. 1680

6th President of Harvard College
- In office June 11, 1685 (Note: Acting: June 11, 1685 – July 23, 1686 Rector: July 23, 1686 – June 27, 1692) – September 6, 1701
- Preceded by: John Rogers
- Succeeded by: Samuel Willard (acting)

Personal details
- Born: June 21, 1639 Dorchester, Massachusetts Bay Colony, British America
- Died: August 23, 1723 (aged 84) Boston, Province of Massachusetts Bay, British America
- Spouse(s): Maria Cotton (m. 1662; died 1714) Ann Cotton (m. 1715)
- Children: 10, including Cotton
- Education: Harvard College (BA, 1656); Trinity College Dublin (MA, 1658); Harvard College (STD, 1692) (hon.)
- Occupation: Minister; author
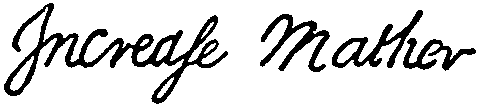
- Signature

Increase Mather (/ˈmæðər/; June 21 (O.S.), 1639 – August 23 (O.S.), 1723) was a Puritan theologian, astronomer and chronicler active in New England principally as a clergyman, serving as the sixth president of Harvard College from 1685 to 1701. Mather conducted extensive research into biblical prophecy, astronomical phenomena, and New England history. During Mather's tenure at Harvard, which coincided with the notorious Salem witch trials, he was influential in the administration of the Massachusetts Bay Colony.

== Early life and education ==
The New England Mathers originally came from the parish of Winwick near Liverpool, in Lancashire, England. Increase Mather was born in Dorchester, Massachusetts Bay Colony, on June 21, 1639, to the Rev. Richard Mather and Kathrine Holt Mather, following their participation in the Great Migration from England due to their nonconformity to the Church of England.

The stated reason for his first name was "…the never-to-be-forgotten increase, of every sort, wherewith God favoured the country about the time of his nativity." The name "Increase" is a literal translation of the Hebrew "Yosëf" (Joseph). He was the youngest of six brothers, the others being Samuel, Nathaniel, Eleazar, Joseph, and Timothy. The first three of these also became ministers.

In 1651, Mather was admitted to Harvard College, where he roomed with and studied under Robert Massey. In 1656, aged 17, he graduated with a Bachelor of Arts degree and began to train for the ministry, giving his first sermon on his 18th birthday. He quickly left Massachusetts and went to Ireland, where he studied at Trinity College, Dublin, for a Master of Arts degree. During his time at Trinity College he was licensed as a Commonwealth Minister by Oliver Cromwell to the joint charge of St Tida's Church, Ballyscullion, and St Swithan's Church, Magherafelt. He graduated in 1658.

== Career ==
After graduation, Mather worked as a chaplain attached to a garrison in the Channel Islands from 1659 to 1661 with a short stint at a church in Gloucester in 1660.

After Cromwell's death in 1658, Mather felt less secure in his post in the Channel Islands due to Charles II's return to the throne. He resigned the position in 1660 and sailed for Boston in 1661. Harvard later awarded Mather the first honorary degree in the New World; he became a Doctor of Sacred Theology in 1692.

=== North Church ===
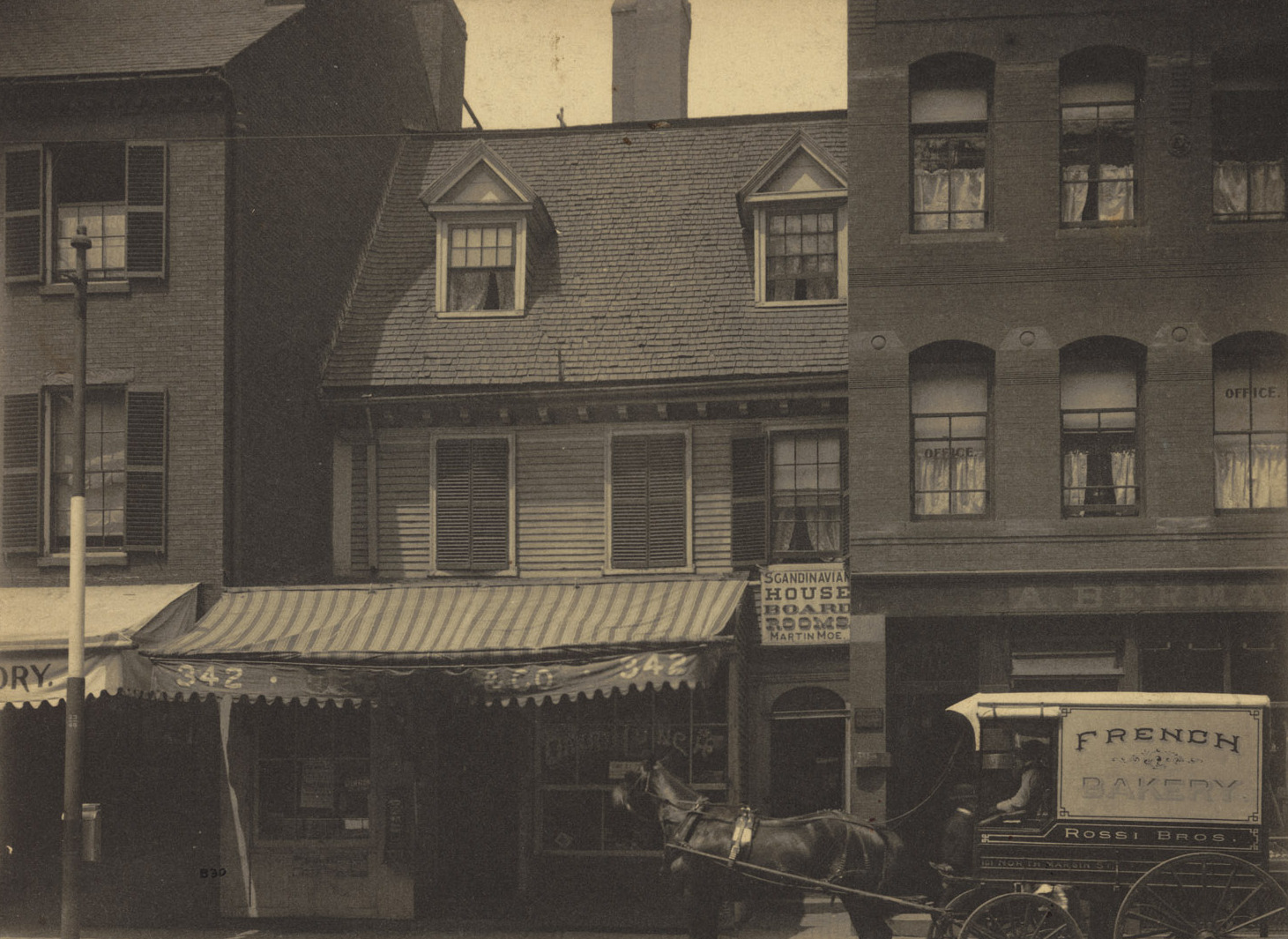
The house Mather built in 1677 near the north corner of Hanover and North Bennet Streets in Boston, pictured here in 1898, survived into the 20th century.

In 1661, with the advent of the Stuart Restoration and resurgence of Anglicanism, Increase returned to Massachusetts Bay Colony, where he married Maria Cotton. She was his step-sister by virtue of his father's marriage to Sarah Hankredge, widow of John Cotton and mother of Maria. Maria gave birth to Cotton Mather in 1663. In 1676, Increase published A Brief History of the War with the Indians in New-England, a contemporary account of King Philip's War.

Mather was ordained as minister of the North Church. (Note: The original Old North meetinghouse, not to be confused with the Anglican/Episcopal Old North Church.) He held this post until he died.

On November 27, 1676, a fire in Boston's North End destroyed 45 buildings, including Mather's home and meeting house. The meeting house was rebuilt soon afterwards, and the Paul Revere House was later constructed on the site of the former Mather House.

As a minister, partially induced by personal observations of the comets of 1680 and 1682, Mather developed an interest in astronomy, and accordingly published a substantial scientific and theological discourse titled Kometographia (1683) based on empirical observations and contemporary astronomical literature.

=== Harvard College ===
While Increase Mather was elected President of Harvard in 1681, he declined initially to serve. On June 11, 1685, however, he was made Acting President. On July 23, 1686, he was appointed Rector. On June 27, 1692, he finished writing the new college charter and became president. On September 5, 1692, while the Salem trials were still ongoing, Increase Mather was awarded a doctorate of divinity, the first doctorate issued at Harvard, and the last for 79 years.

Mather was rarely present on campus or in the town, especially during his term of Rector, as he was out of the Colony for all but two years of his term in that office. Despite his absences he did make some changes: re-implementation of Greek and Hebrew instruction, replacement of classical Roman authors with Biblical and Christian authors in ethics classes, enactment of requirements that students attend classes regularly, live and eat on campus, and that seniors not haze other students.

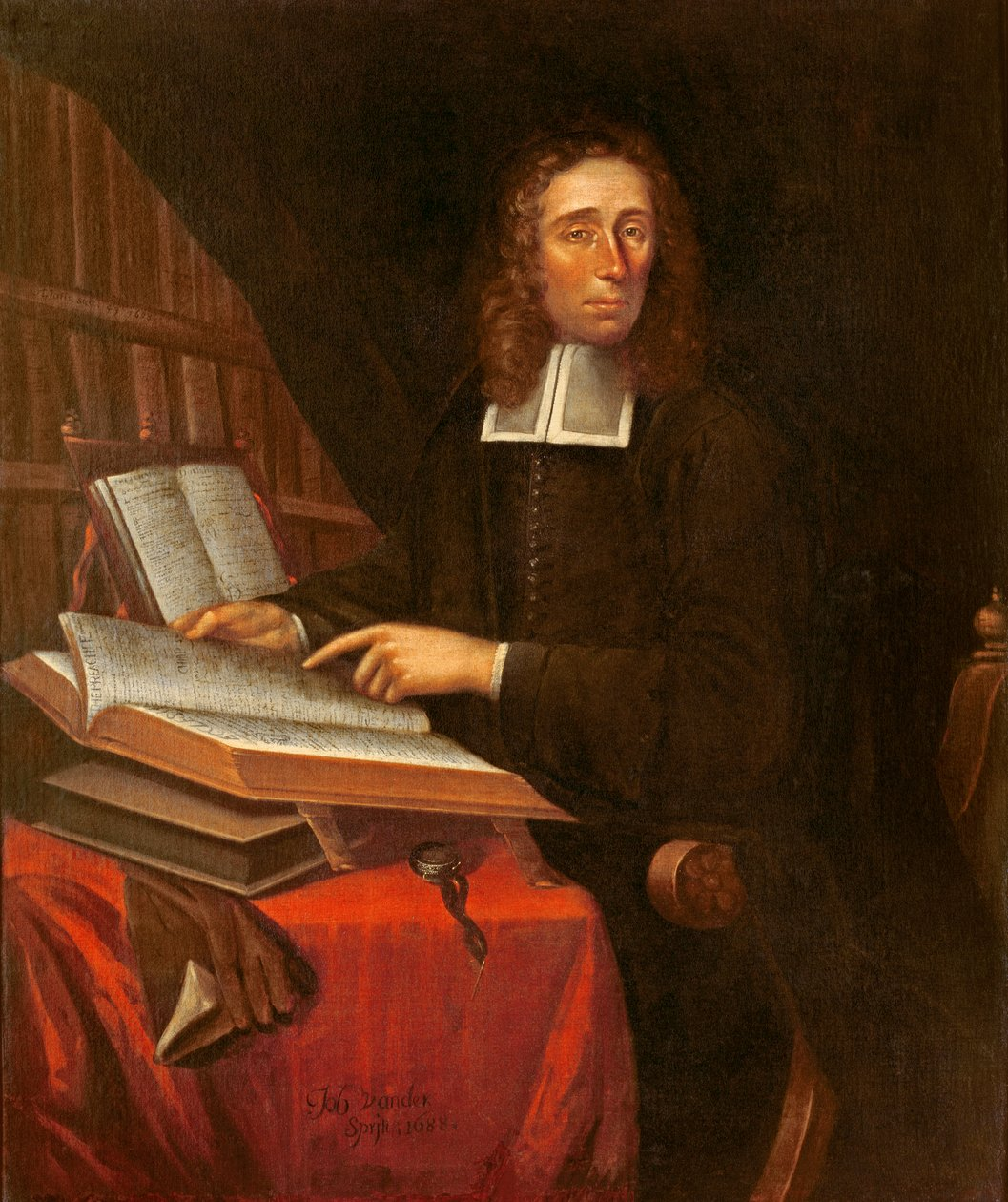
1688 portrait of Mather by Joan van der Spriet

=== Politics ===
While politics and Puritan religion were closely related during Increase's lifetime, his first direct involvement with politics occurred as a result of James II of England's manipulation of the New England governments. In 1686, James revoked the Charter of Massachusetts in the process of creating the Dominion of New England.

The Dominion was headed by Edmund Andros, who not only disliked puritanism and was haughty, but ruled as a near-absolute dictator: Town meetings were outlawed, leaving the Dominion without consent of the governed, marriage was removed from the clergy, and the Old South Church was temporarily appropriated for Anglican services.

The 1687 Declaration of Indulgence, prohibiting discrimination against Catholics, saw staunch opposition from the Puritan establishment. When Mather successfully roused opposition to revocation of the charter, he was nearly framed for treason. He traveled to London (eluding spies out to catch him) to petition the King. While engaged in petitioning he published pieces to build popular support for his positions, such as A Narrative of the Miseries of New-England, By Reason of an Arbitrary Government Erected there Under Sir Edmund Andros (1688) and A Brief Relation for the Confirmation of Charter Privileges (1691).

He attempted to restore the old charter and obtain a royal charter for Harvard; however, he abandoned that course and changed his petitions, favoring a new charter not lacking any of the rights previously granted. Following the Glorious Revolution and subsequent overthrow of Andros, a new charter was granted to the colony. The 1692 charter was a major departure from its predecessor, granting sweeping home rule, establishing an elective legislature, enfranchising all freeholders (previously only men admitted to a congregation could vote), and uniting the Massachusetts Bay Colony and Plymouth Colony. Following Andros' deposition and arrest, he had William Phips appointed as Royal Governor and they returned to Massachusetts, arriving on May 14, 1692. Following his return, the administration of Harvard grew increasingly insistent that he reside nearer to the institution. Not wanting to leave his Second Church, he did not do so, and eventually resigned the Presidency.

=== Salem witch trials ===
In 1681, the same year he was elected president of Harvard (but never assumed office until 1685) and when his son Cotton Mather was only 18-years-old, Increase began work on a manuscript that was to be a collection of "illustrious providences" and he solicited contributions from the other Puritan ministers. This work demonstrated a belated interest in witchcraft relative to the European continent, where witch trials had gone into a steep decline after reaching "peak intensity during the century 1570–1670" but this reflected a similar belated interest among a certain milieu in London around the same time. Increase's book Remarkable Providences was published in 1684 and forwards a doctrinal belief in the real power of witchcraft. One of the more curious aspects of the book is that while it cites numerous Reformation theologians (Luther, Beza, Melancthon) and many well-known writers on witchcraft including Dominican inquisitor Heinrich Kramer (author of the notorious witch-hunting manual Malleus Maleficarum), it does not cite John Calvin. The book likely had a strong influence on Cotton.

When the witch trials began in March 1692, Increase Mather was still in London, where he had negotiated a new charter for Massachusetts. He returned to Boston in mid-May, and initially seems to have approved of the trials. After the execution of Bridget Bishop on June 10, governor Phips sought the advice of Boston's leading clergy, probably hoping they would support the court's use of spectral evidence. Instead, Mather and the other ministers replied on June 15, urging caution and strongly opposing spectral evidence.

In early August, Mather began writing a book, Cases of Conscience Concerning Evil Spirits, which aimed to nullify the court's use of such evidence, as well as the "touch test". He completed the book on October 3, and sent the manuscript to the governor. Mather also sought the approval of the Boston assembly of ministers, who supported him, with Samuel Willard writing a preface to the book on behalf of thirteen ministers. Professor Benjamin C. Ray comments: "Mather ended his book with the sweeping and laudable conclusion: 'It were better that ten suspected Witches should escape, than one innocent Person should be Condemned.' Had Mather said nothing more than these noble words, history would remember him as the wise elder statesman who exposed the errors of the court (though rather belatedly)".

Instead, at the request of his son Cotton, who was writing a book in defense of the court, Mather began to write a postscript to his own book supporting his son's work. The postscript defended the judges, saying that they had made no mistake, as they had relied on more than just spectral evidence. He mentioned his own attendance at the trial of fellow minister George Burroughs (who seems to have substituted at the pulpit for Mather on at least one occasion), saying "had I been one of his Judges, I could not have acquitted him". He also emphasized and endorsed the confessions extracted from several of the accused. Willard felt betrayed by Mather's postscript, and later went on to publish his own essay on the trials.

On October 12, a narrow vote in the legislative assembly advised consultation with the Boston ministers about whether the witch trials should continue. Knowing the concerns raised by Mather and the ministers, governor Phips dissolved the court. However, four prisoners who had confessed to witchcraft and had been sentenced to death remained in jail, along with several children who had also confessed and were awaiting trial. A letter from Thomas Brattle and a petition by Andover ministers Francis Dane and Thomas Barnard, sent soon before the legislature's vote, highlighted that several confessions had been obtained by coercion. Around this time, Mather seems to have begun to doubt the confessions too, despite having defended their use in his postscript. He traveled to Salem jail, and on October 19 wrote an account of his interviews with the prisoners, making the case that their confessions had been forced. This was his final argument against the court. His Cases of Conscience Concerning Evil Spirits, including the postscript and Willard's preface, was published in November (like his work from 1684, it also cites the Malleus Maleficarum). All prisoners avoided execution, and no more were subsequently killed.

Despite this, his reputation was not improved afterwards or for posterity, due to his association with the trials and his subsequent refusal to denounce them. He was also briefly mentioned in a thorough treatment of his son Cotton by Robert Calef in his comprehensive book of the Salem Trials and their aftermath, More Wonders of the Invisible World, which the Encyclopædia Britannica described as "a personal blow to him as well as to his son". Increase Mather was said to have burned Calef's book in Harvard Yard.

In 1715, following the death of his wife Maria the previous year, he married Ann Cotton, widow of his nephew John.

Mather owned a slave named Spaniard.

== Illness and death ==
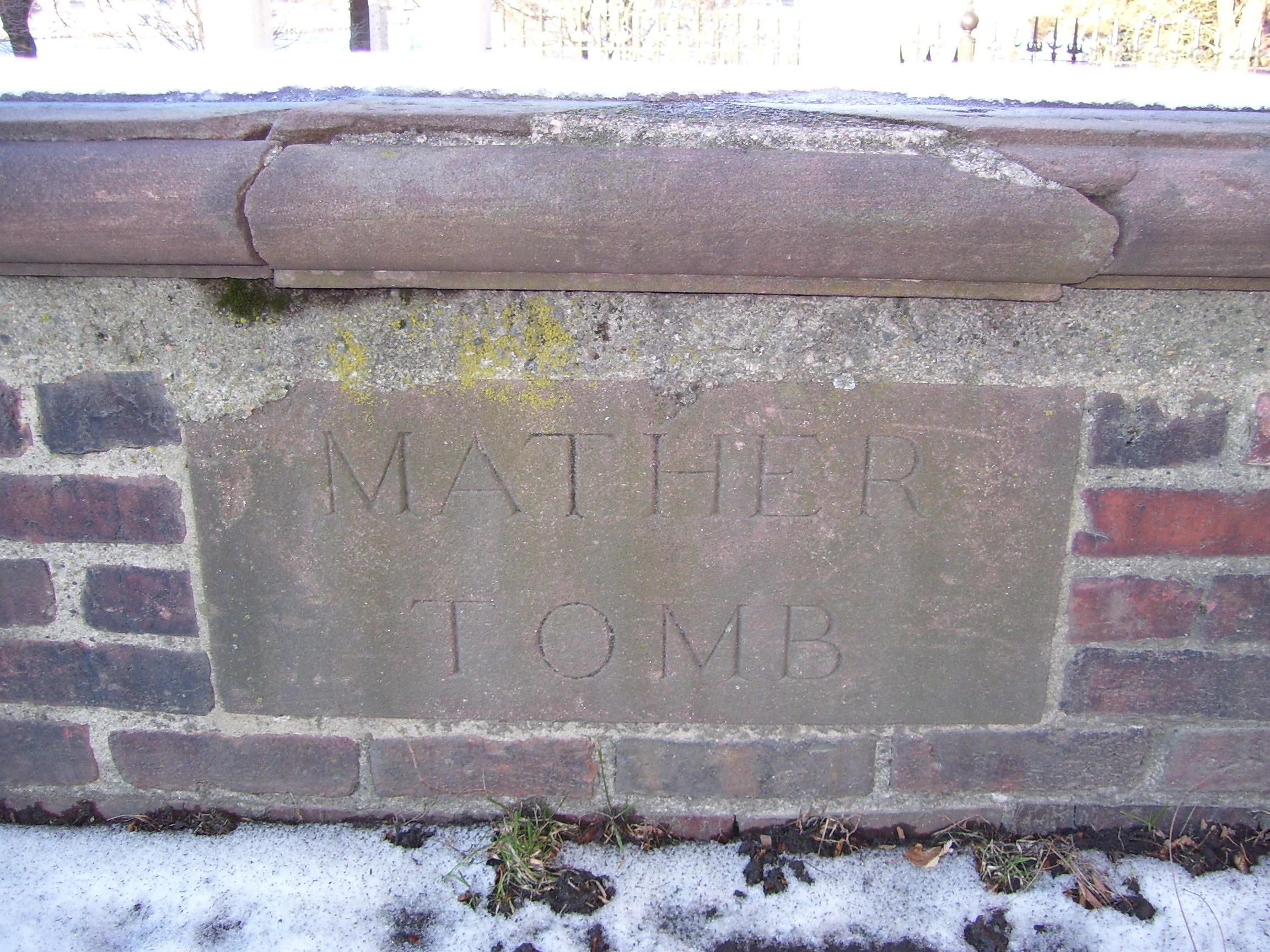
The Mather tomb in Copp's Hill Burying Ground

On September 27, 1722, he fainted and was thereafter bedridden. In August 1723, he suffered bladder failure and died three weeks later on August 23, 1723, in Boston, aged 84. He was buried in Copp's Hill Burying Ground.

Before his death, he took lodging at the retreat of Mineral Spring Pond to recover from his illness and drink from the famous healing waters of the springs from Spring Pond.

== Beliefs ==
Throughout his life Mather was a staunch Puritan, opposing anything openly contradictory to, mutually exclusive with, or potentially "distracting" from, his religious beliefs. He supported suppression of intoxication, unnecessary effort on Sundays and ostentatious clothing. He was initially opposed to the Half-Way Covenant but later supported it. He firmly believed in the direct appearance of God's disfavor in everyday life, e.g. the weather, political situations, attacks by Native Americans, fires and floods, etc.

He was strenuous in attempting to keep people to his idea of morality, making strong use of jeremiads to try to prevent indifference and especially to try to get government officials to enforce public morality. During his tenure at Harvard he regularly stamped out any relaxation of Puritan strictness, such as latitudinarianism, which had flourished during his overseas absence.

Following his acceptance of the Covenant, Solomon Stoddard and others attempted to further liberalize Puritanism by baptism of children who had nonmember parents and admittance of all but the openly immoral to services. To try to stop this, Mather had a synod called to outlaw similar measures. A declaration was adopted, but never made binding.

== In popular culture ==
In John Neal's 1828 novel Rachel Dyer, Increase Mather appears at the end of Martha Corey's witchcraft trial to announce the guilty verdict and give a speech. He is also played by Stephen Lang in the 2014 TV series Salem. Increase Mather also appears in Act of Oblivion (2022) by Robert Harris.

== Portraiture ==
A portrait of Increase Mather hangs in the Middle Common Room of Mansfield College, Oxford.

== Bibliography ==
- Mather, Increase (October 1961), "Autobiography" (PDF), AAS Proceedings, American antiquarian
- Weyer, Johann (1998). Kohl, Benjamin J.; Midelfort, H.C. Erik (eds.). On Witchcraft. Translated by Shea, John. Pegasus Press. ISBN 978-1-88981802-3.
- Murdock, Kenneth Ballard (1925). Increase Mather. The Foremost American Puritan. Cambridge, Massachusetts: Harvard University Press. doi:10.4159/harvard.9780674429420.

Academic offices
Preceded by John Rogers	President of Harvard College; 1685–1686, acting 1686–1692, Rector; 1692–1701	Succeeded by Samuel Willard, acting
Religious titles
Preceded by John Mayo	Old North Church; 1673–1723	Succeeded by Cotton Mather
