= Charles Chauncy =

Anglo-American clergyman and president of Harvard College (1592–1672)

The Reverend Charles Chauncy

2nd President of Harvard College
- In office November 27, 1654 – February 19, 1672
- Preceded by: Henry Dunster
- Succeeded by: Leonard Hoar

Personal details
- Born: 1592 Yardley, Hertfordshire, England
- Died: February 19, 1672 (aged 79) Cambridge, Massachusetts Bay

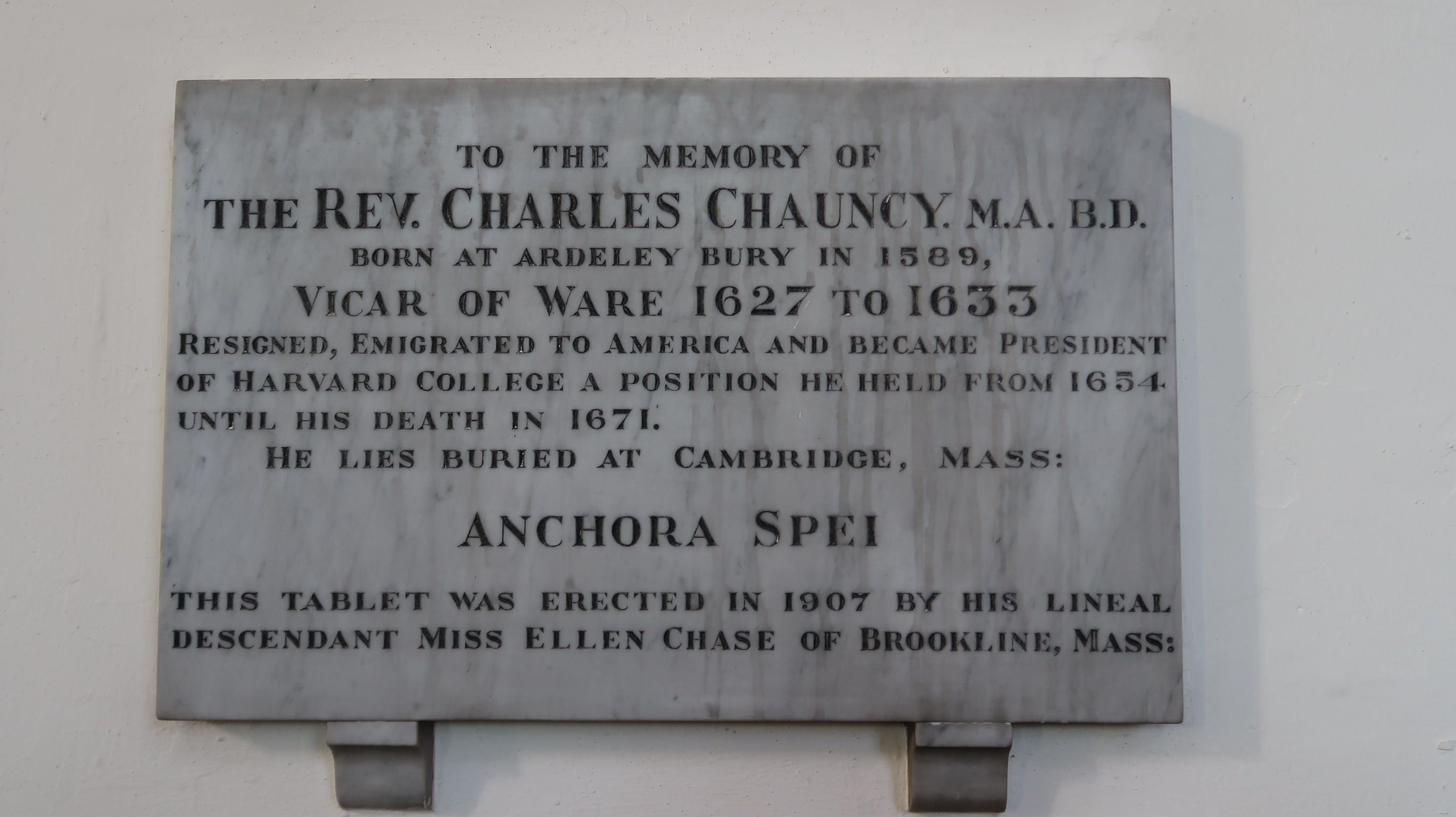
A wall memorial erected in St Mary's Church, Ware, England by Charles Chauncy's direct descendant in 1907

Charles Chauncy (baptized 5 November 1592 – 19 February 1672) was an Anglo-American Congregational clergyman, educator, and secondarily, a physician who served as the second president of Harvard College from 1654 to 1672.

== Early life and education ==
Chauncy was born at Ardeley, Hertfordshire, England. The village was then known as Yardley. The manor belonged to the Dean and Chapter of St Paul's Cathedral, which leased the manor-house (a moated property called "Ardeley Bury") and the demesne lands to the Chauncy family.

He was educated at Westminster School in London, and then at Trinity College at the University of Cambridge, where he later was a lecturer in Greek.

== Career ==
In 1627, the College arranged for him to be appointed vicar of St Mary's, the parish church of Ware, Hertfordshire. In 1633, he left Ware to become vicar of Marston St. Lawrence, Northamptonshire. At both parishes he faced disciplinary procedures for his Puritan views which included opposition to communion rails.

He emigrated to America in 1637. He preached at Plymouth until 1641, then at Scituate where, says Cotton Mather, "he remained for three years and three times three years, cultivating the vineyard of the Lord." He was appointed president of Harvard College in 1654. He held that office until his death in 1671. His descendants also include Connecticut governor and National Baseball Hall of Fame member, Morgan Bulkeley. Besides a number of sermons, Chauncy published The Doctrine of the Sacrament, with the Right Use Thereof (1642); The Plain Doctrine of the Justification of a Sinner in the Sight of God (1659), a collection of 26 sermons; and Antisynodalia Scripta Americana (1662).

During his time at Plymouth and Scituate, Chauncy got into a heated debate with the religious and secular leaders of the Plymouth Colony over the issue of baptism. Chauncy taught that only baptism by full immersion was valid, while the Separatist Elders taught that sprinkling water over the body was just as valid. The sprinkling method of baptism was much preferred in New England due to its cooler and harsher climate. The religious leaders of the Plymouth Colony held public debates, trying to convince Chauncy to change his views. When Chauncy still did not change his views, the Pilgrim leaders wrote to congregations in Boston and New Haven soliciting their views, and all the congregations wrote back that both forms of baptism were valid. Still, Chauncy did not change his teachings. It was because of this issue that Chauncy left Plymouth for Scituate in 1641.

A year after arriving in Scituate, Chauncy had a chance to practice what he preached, when he publicly baptized his twin sons by full immersion. The plan backfired when one of his sons passed out due to being dunked in the water. The mother of the child who was supposed be baptized at the same event refused to let it happen, and according to John Winthrop, got a hold of Chauncy and "near pulled him into the water". When Chauncy was hired to be President of Harvard, he had to promise the leaders in Boston that he would keep his views on baptism quiet.

== Death ==
He died on 19 February 1672 and was buried at New Cambridge.

== Family ==
Coat of Arms of Charles Chauncey

Chauncy married at Ware on 17 March 1630 Catherine, daughter of Robert Eyre, barrister-at-law, of Salisbury, Wiltshire. By her, who died on 24 January 1668, aged 66, he had six sons, all bred to the ministry and graduates of Harvard, and two daughters. His second son was the physician and nonconformist minister Ichabod Chauncey.

His grandson, Nathaniel Chauncey, became the first person to receive a degree from Yale College and was a minister of the First Congregational Church in Durham, Connecticut. His great-grandson was also named Charles Chauncy, minister of the First Church (Congregational) of Boston 1727–1787, an Old-Light opponent of Jonathan Edwards and the New Light ministers of the Great Awakening, and a precursor of Unitarianism.

Sir Henry Chauncy, the historian, was his grandnephew.

== Literature ==
- Cotton Mather, Magnalia (London, 1702)
- Fowler, Memorials of the Chaunceys (Boston, 1858)
- William Bradford, Of Plymouth Plantation
- John Winthrop, Journal of John Winthrop

Academic offices
Preceded by Henry Dunster	President of Harvard College; 1654–1672	Succeeded by Leonard Hoar
