= Two Years Before the Mast (film) =

1946 film by John Farrow

- Directed by: John Farrow
- Screenplay by: Seton I. Miller; George Bruce
- Based on: Two Years Before the Mast by Richard Henry Dana Jr.
- Produced by: Seton I. Miller
- Starring: Alan Ladd; Brian Donlevy; William Bendix; Barry Fitzgerald
- Cinematography: Ernest Laszlo
- Edited by: Eda Warren
- Music by: Victor Young
- Production company: Paramount Pictures
- Distributed by: Paramount Pictures
- Release date: November 22, 1946
- Running time: 98 minutes
- Country: United States
- Language: English
- Budget: $2 million
- Box office: $4.4 million (US/ Canada rentals); 1,270,487 admissions (France)

Two Years Before the Mast is a 1946 American historical adventure film directed by John Farrow and starring Alan Ladd, Brian Donlevy, William Bendix, and Barry Fitzgerald. It is loosely based on Richard Henry Dana Jr.'s travel book of the same name and was produced and distributed by Paramount Pictures.

== Plot ==
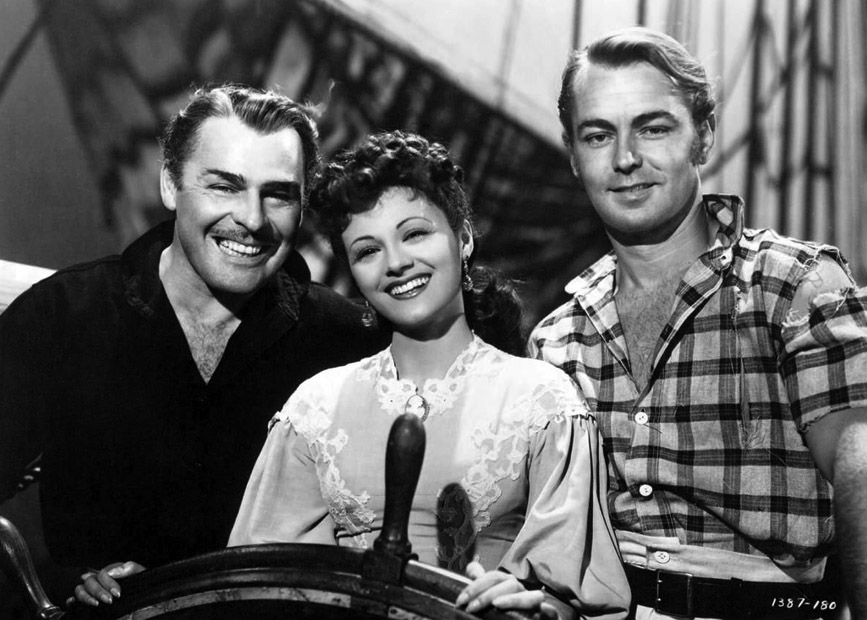
Brian Donlevy, Esther Fernández and Alan Ladd in a promotional picture of the film.

In 1834, Charles Stewart, the spoiled, dissolute son of a shipping magnate, is shanghaied aboard the Pilgrim, one of his father's own ships. He embarks upon a long, hellish sea voyage under the tyrannical rule of Captain Francis Thompson, assisted by his first mate, Amazeen. One of his crewmates is Richard Henry Dana Jr., who ultimately recounted the entire voyage in a book.

== Cast ==
- Alan Ladd as Charles Stewart
- Brian Donlevy as Richard Henry Dana
- William Bendix as First Mate Amazeen
- Barry Fitzgerald as Terence O'Feenaghty
- Howard da Silva as Captain Thompson
- Esther Fernández as Maria Dominguez
- Albert Dekker as Brown
- Luis van Rooten as 2nd Mate Foster
- Darryl Hickman as Sam Hooper
- Roman Bohnen as Macklin
- Ray Collins as Gordon Stewart
- Theodore Newton as Hayes
- Tom Powers as Bellamer
- James Burke as Carrick
- Frank Faylen as Hansen

== Production ==
=== Development ===
In 1936, Republic Studios announced plans to make a version of the film starring James Dunn and produced by Bert Clark. Actor Lew Ayres was mentioned as a possible director and Lionel Barrymore, or, if he refused, Walter Connolly was going to star. The movie was meant to be an attempt by Republic to move into bigger budgeted productions. Negotiations with Barrymore, Connolly and Fredric March fell through and the studio tried to sign Henry Wilcoxon.

Republic never made the movie. Edward Small announced plans to film the book in 1939 under his deal with United Artists. However this was postponed when World War II was declared, as Small was reluctant to make such an expensive film in an uncertain marketplace. Plans to film the book were again announced in 1940 and 1941 but no movie resulted. Paramount eventually bought the rights off Small in 1943, including a script Seton I Miller had written for the producer in 1939; Miller had since become a writer and producer at Paramount. Alan Ladd was announced as star.

=== Pre-Production ===
In March 1944 it was announced Ladd would be re-inducted into the army but that this would be delayed so he could make Mast.

Brian Donlevy was originally going to play the sadistic captain but was given the role of Dana instead. Howard da Silva, who had just achieved fame playing Judd in Oklahoma! on Broadway, played the captain.

Mexican film star Esther Fernández had been signed to Paramount for two years without making a film. John Farrow watched some test footage she made and was impressed; she was brought back to play the female lead.

Due to war time restrictions – notably lack of transport – Paramount had endured many logistical difficulties filming the pirate movie Frenchman's Creek on location. This prompted them to decide to shoot Two Years Before the Mast entirely within the confines of the studio. Seascapes and soundscapes from Paramount's Souls at Sea (1937) were re-used.

The film heavily dramatised the memoir but attempted to be faithful. "Dana's tale is so well known that we shall have to stay close to the line of his yarn", said John Farrow, "Especially in the characters." Extensive research was done on the project for six months prior to shooting.

=== Shooting ===
Filming began in May 1944 and took 69 days. "We could do it in less but we've got to allow stubble to grow", said Farrow. "Chins have got to grow over with gray plush. May cost a hundred thousand. Depends on how long it takes those chins to sprout. But meantime, we can be shooting storms and Miss Fernandez."

Alan Ladd injured his back during filming and had to miss a week of shooting.

The movie was shot on three studio sound stages. Four stages were combined into one, for the interiors. There was another stage holding the water tank. Two models of the ship were built at a total cost of $150,000. Paramount were so pleased with Da Silva's performance they signed him to a seven-year contract. Darryl Hickman, who played the cabin boy, also impressed and was signed to a long-term contract.

== Release ==
The film was not released until late 1946, after the release of several films Ladd made subsequent to Mast: Salty O'Rourke, The Blue Dahlia and O.S.S.. This also meant that Barry Fitzgerald, who became a star in Going My Way (1944) while the film was waiting for release, was upped to above the title billing.

=== Box office ===
Two Years Before the Mast was one of the most popular films released in the US that year. The Los Angeles Times described it as "a phenomenal hit". Variety listed it as the tenth most popular movie of 1946.

The success of the movie led to Ladd and Farrow being teamed seven years later on another period "sailing" movie, Botany Bay (1953).
