= Dana Point, California =

City in California, United States

- City
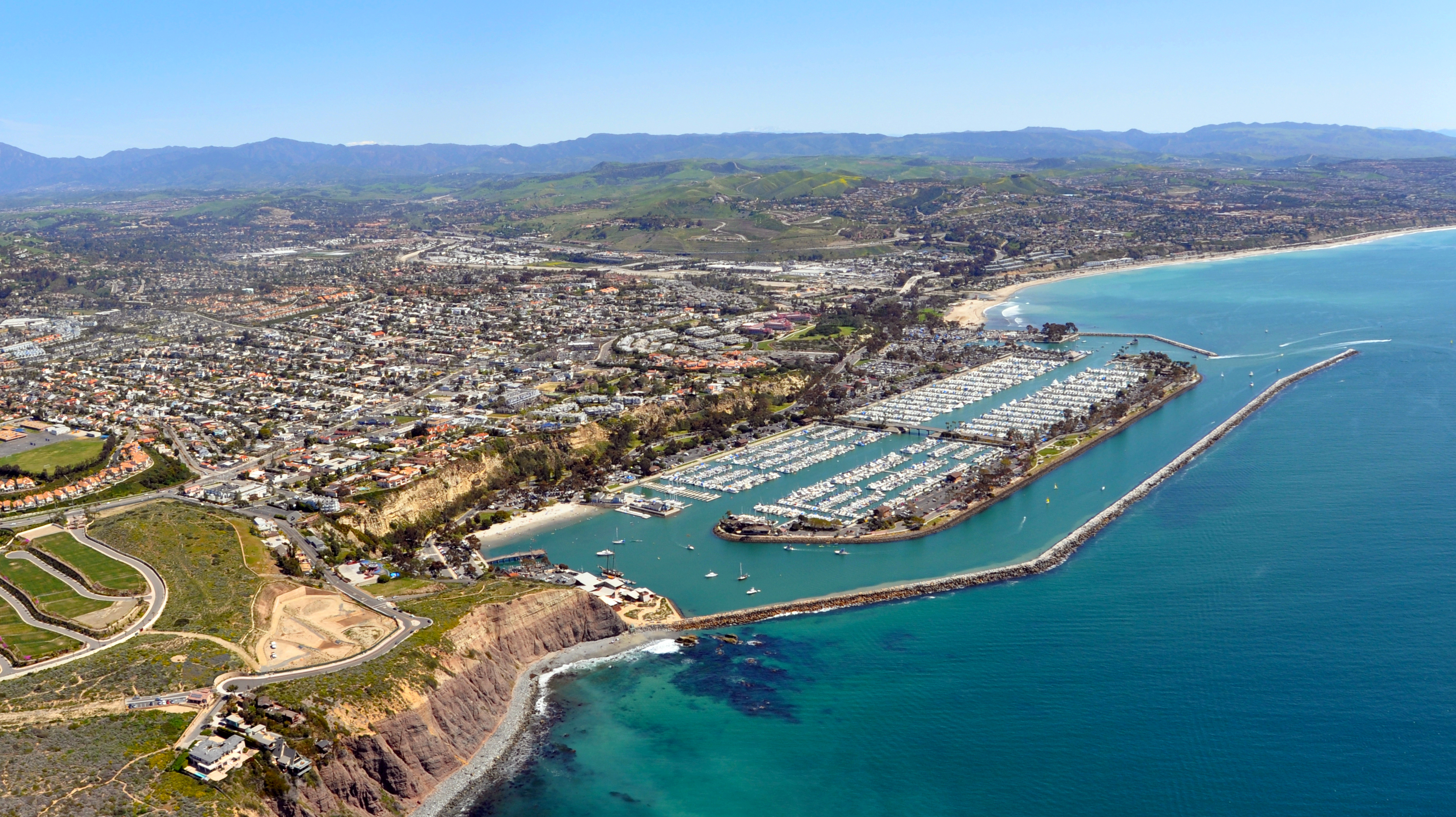
- Aerial view of Dana Point

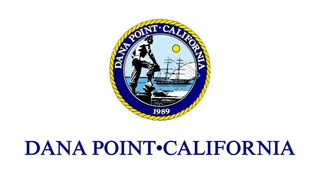
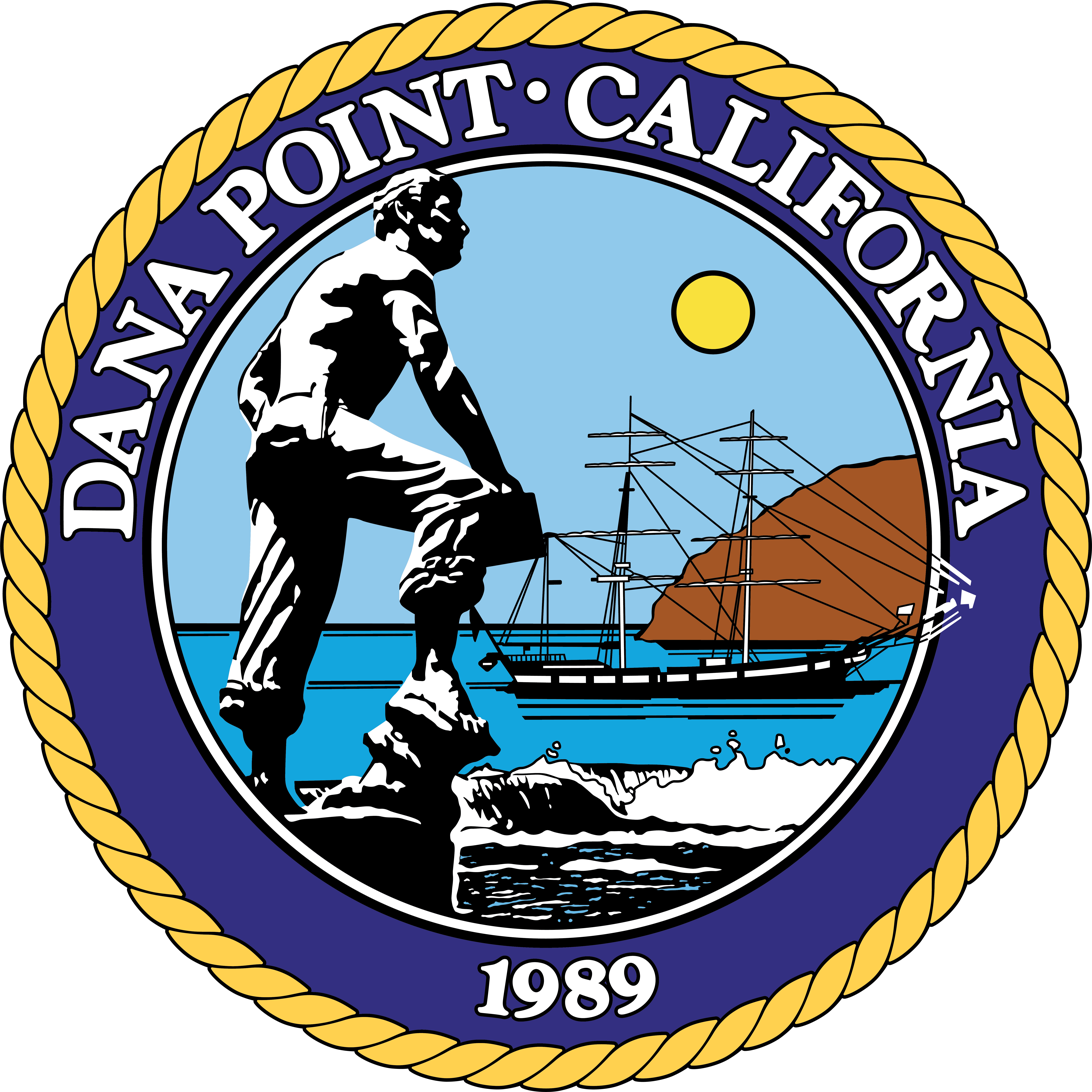
- Flag Seal
- Motto: "Harboring the Good Life"
- Interactive map of Dana Point, California
- Location within California Location within the United States
- Coordinates: 33°28′2″N 117°41′53″W
- Country: United States
- State: California
- County: Orange
- Incorporated: January 1, 1989
- Named for: Richard Henry Dana Jr.

Government
  - Type: Council-Manager
  - Mayor: Matthew Pagano
  - City Manager: Mike Killebrew

Area
  - Total: 6.75 sq mi (17.49 km^{2})
  - Land: 6.49 sq mi (16.80 km^{2})
  - Water: 0.26 sq mi (0.68 km^{2}) 3.91%
- Elevation: 144 ft (44 m)

Population (2020)
  - Total: 33,107
  - Density: 5,102.7/sq mi (1,970.18/km^{2})
- Time zone: UTC−8 (Pacific)
  - Summer (DST): UTC−7 (PDT)
- ZIP Codes: 92624, 92629
- Area code: 949
- FIPS code: 06-17946
- GNIS feature IDs: 1656474, 2410293
- Website: www.danapoint.org

California Historical Landmark
- Reference no.: 189

Dana Point (/ˌdeɪnə-/ DAY-nuh) is a coastal city located in southern Orange County, California, United States. The population was 33,107 at the 2020 census. With one of the few harbors along the Orange County coast and with ready access via State Route 1, it is a popular local destination for surfing.

The city was named after the headland of Dana Point, which was in turn named after Richard Henry Dana Jr., whose 1840 memoir Two Years Before the Mast included a description of the area. Dana described the locale, including neighboring San Juan Capistrano, as "the only romantic spot on the coast". This area is designated California Historical Landmark #189.

== History ==
=== Indigenous ===
The Acjachemen village site of Toovannga was located near the present-day site of Dana Point Harbor. The village was located near the mouth of the San Juan Creek. The people lived in villages of around 250 people and stewarded the land into a thriving ecosystem. Each village was politically independent and established ties with other villages through marriage. The area of Dana Point is located downstream from the mother village of Putuidem.

The arrival of European settlers in the area began with the Portolá expedition (1769–1770). Starting in 1776, people from the village of Ubange, located near Dana Point, were brought to Mission San Juan Capistrano for conversion to Christianity and to be exploited as labor to work the mission's grounds. By 1778, dissatisfaction with the missions led to the formation of a revolt by tribal leader Cinquanto that was preemptively stopped by the Spanish.

=== Mexican era ===
Dana Point was a popular port for ships involved with the hide trade with nearby Mission San Juan Capistrano. Trading reached its peak in the 1830s and 1840s. In 1818, Argentine sailor Hippolyte de Bouchard anchored there while conducting his raid on the mission. Richard Henry Dana then visited the area in 1835 while serving aboard the sailing brig Pilgrim on her voyage along the California coastline.

=== American era ===
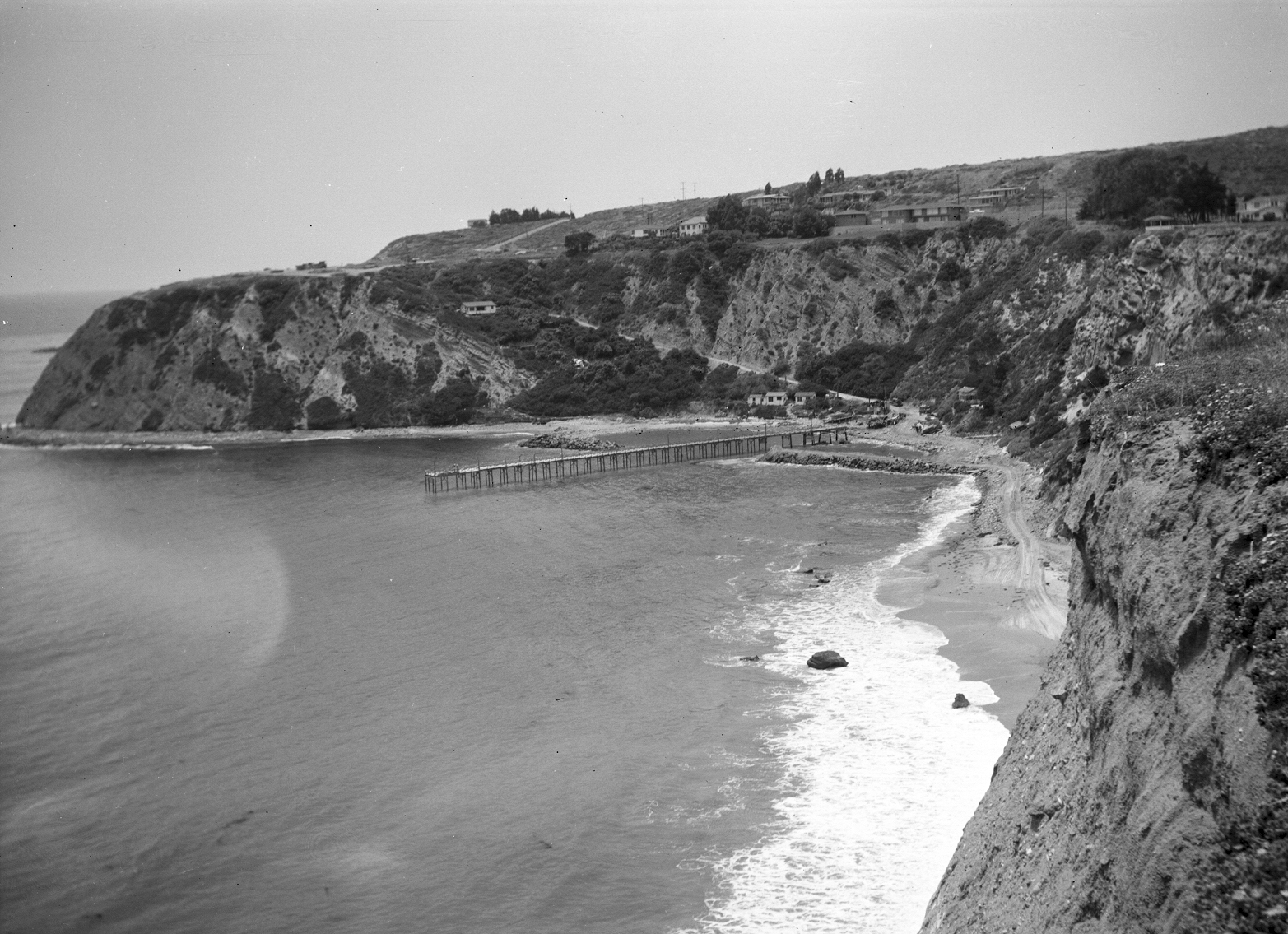
The headlands and pier at Dana Point, ca. 1925, prior to construction of the harbor

In 1923, Los Angeles Times publisher Harry Chandler and General M. H. Sherman, director of the Pacific Electric Railway Company, created a major real estate group to develop the Hollywood Hills. Sidney H. Woodruff, already a prominent Los Angeles homebuilder, was hired to lead the project.

In 1926, Woodruff, Chandler, and Sherman created the Dana Point Syndicate. They invited other investors, company presidents, movie producers, and real estate investors to join them in purchasing 1,388 acres (5.6 km^{2}) of land, some of which included the "Headlands" of today. Promising tree-lined and paved streets, electricity, telephones, sidewalks, water mains, storm drains, sewers, and other amenities, Woodruff built about three dozen homes and a number of commercial buildings.

Dana Point Headlands in 2026

Most of these "Woodruff" houses are concentrated in the Dana Point historic core, also called Lantern Village today home to about 12,000 residents. The streets are named after the different colored lanterns—Street of the Violet Lantern, Blue Lantern, etc.— used by ships 200 years ago to advertise their wares when in the Dana Point natural harbor. His crowning structure was to be the Dana Point Inn, a Mediterranean-like resort hotel on the cliffs overlooking the harbor. After a celebratory groundbreaking in 1930, a three-story foundation was poured and a 135-foot (41 m) shaft was dug for an elevator to transport hotel guests to and from the beach. The Great Depression caused construction to halt, however. Although Woodruff continued to seek financial support, thr project was abandoned in 1939. Subsequently, he sold the remaining holdings of the Dana Point Syndicate. Thirty-four of the original thirty-five Woodruff residences are still occupied.

=== Dana Point Harbor ===
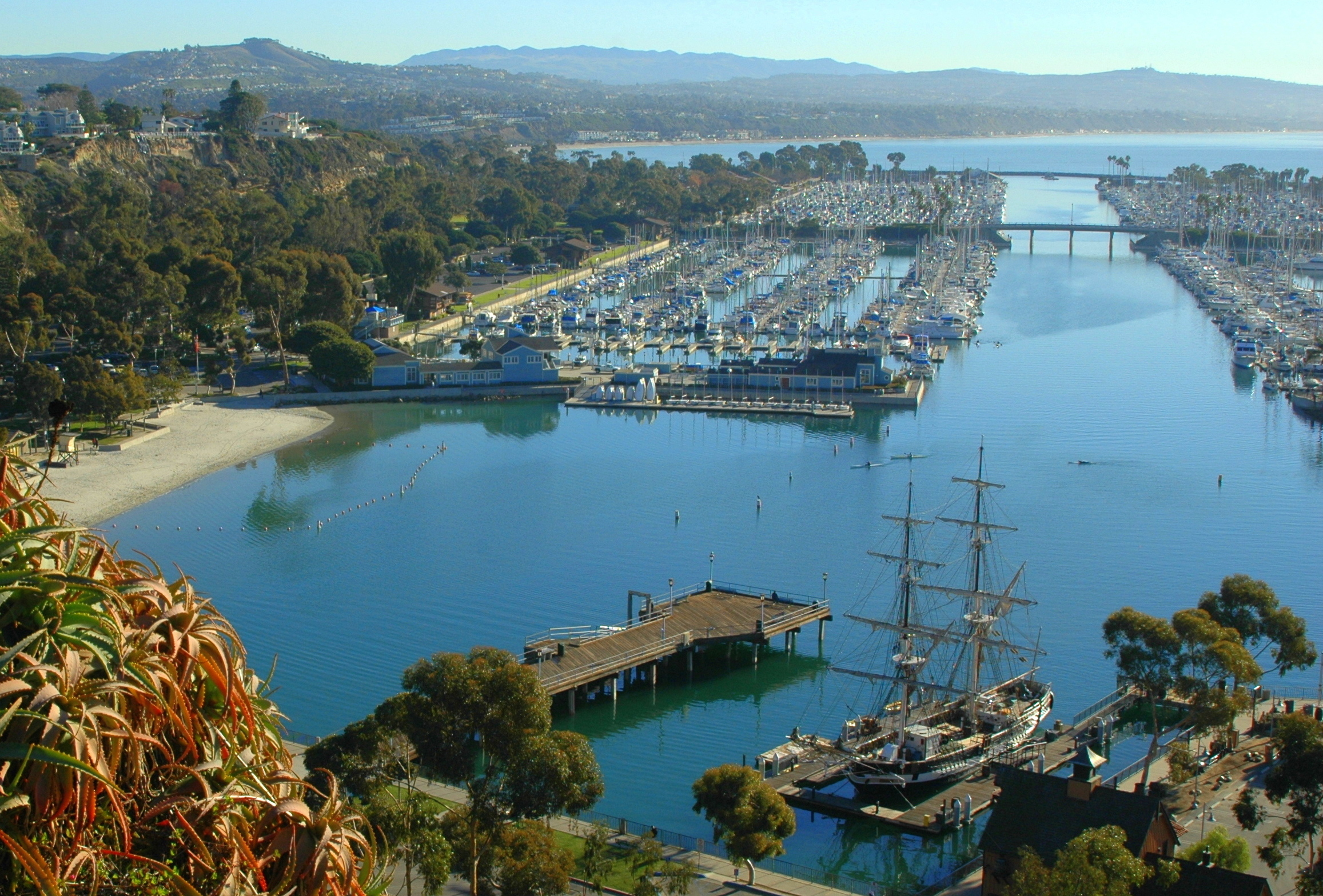
View of Dana Point Harbor with the former replica ship Pilgrim berthed at the Ocean Institute in the foreground

The harbor, built in the 1960s and dedicated on July 31, 1971, is home to a marina, shops, and restaurants, and is a point of departure for the Catalina Express, a transportation service to and from the city of Avalon on Catalina Island. The entire harbor of Dana Point, including the Embarcadero Marina shops and restaurants, was set in 2014 for complete demolition and redevelopment. The current vintage nautical style is being abandoned for a Tech Minimalist concept using metal roofs as well as Minimalist landscaping.

Although Richard Henry Dana Jr., author of Two Years Before the Mast, described the anchorage as poor, it is now a developed harbor and had a replica of his ship, the brig Pilgrim. The replica Pilgrim was used as a classroom by the Ocean Institute until it sank in 2020.

=== Strand ===
The Strands at Headlands is a luxury housing development built on land that was originally part of the Chandler Family holdings. For decades the land facing the beach was home to the Dana Strand Beach and Tennis Club, a mobile home community that closed in the late 1980s. For years, access to the Strands beach was limited to hiking down a dirt trail where the mobile homes had stood. The Strands parcel included the actual headlands and bluff of Dana Point as well and was one of the last large coast properties available for development along the Orange County Coast. During the course of a ten-year approval process, the original high-density plan, which included a large multi-story hotel on the bluff top and hundreds of houses and multi-family units, was reduced in scope to just over 100 home sites. As part of negotiations with the California Coastal Commission, the developer agreed to turn the bluff into a nature preserve and build over $11 million worth of public improvements to provide easier access to Strands Beach. The improvements include stairs, restrooms, a beach-front sidewalk and a funicular to transport visitors from the parking lot to the beach. After extensive infrastructure construction, lots were offered for sale in the fall of 2006. Lots in the development are rectangular with modern houses commonly priced above $10,000,000. The development has provided much easier access to the beach below and has allowed surfers and other beach visitors to access the beach quickly and easily. Strands Homeowners, through a Mello-Roos assessment, pay for the upkeep of the beach improvements.

The community of Niguel Shores is subject to the eroding bluffs of the Strand.

=== Capistrano Beach ===
Capistrano Beach, Beach Road, South Dana Point and North San Clemente

In 1928, a corporate entity of the American industrial giant Edward Doheny, who had built his fortune in oil production in Southern California and Mexico, purchased a number of lots in Capistrano Beach. Doheny's son, Ned, formed a development company, the Capistrano Beach Company, which included his wife's twin brothers, Clark and Warren Smith, and Luther Eldridge, a contractor, to build a community of Spanish style houses. According to Dana Point historians Baum and Burnes,* Eldridge favored two dominant characteristics in his homes, a typically Spanish roofline and the use of large ceiling beams in the main rooms of the houses. The roofline, covered with red tiles, incorporated a low-pitched gable, spreading out to one short and one long roof. The ceiling beams were decorated with stenciled artwork painted by artist Alex Meston. Eldridge was able to complete the original Doheny family house on the bluffs, four houses on the beach, and 18 other homes scattered throughout the area before tragedy struck the ambitious project.

Edward Doheny was preparing for his criminal trial for bribery in the Teapot Dome Scandal, and on February 16, 1929, Ned Doheny and Hugh Plunkett, his friend and secretary, who were to testify in the trial, were killed in a murder that still remains unsolved. In 1931, as a memorial to Ned, Petroleum Securities Company, Doheny's family-owned business, made a gift of 41.4 acres (168,000 m^{2}) to the State of California, which is now Doheny State Beach. The unimproved Capistrano Beach properties passed back to Edward Doheny, and, upon his death in 1935, to his wife and heirs. By 1944, all of the properties had been sold to private parties. The Doheny family also funded the building of what was then called St. Edward's Chapel in Capistrano Beach. The chapel soon grew, received canonical status as a parish, and moved to its current bluff-top location in Dana Point, overlooking Doheny State Beach.

In October 2022, the California Coastal Commission approved the Doheny Desalination Plant at Doheny State Beach capable of producing 5 to 15 million gallons of fresh water per day.

=== Surfing ===
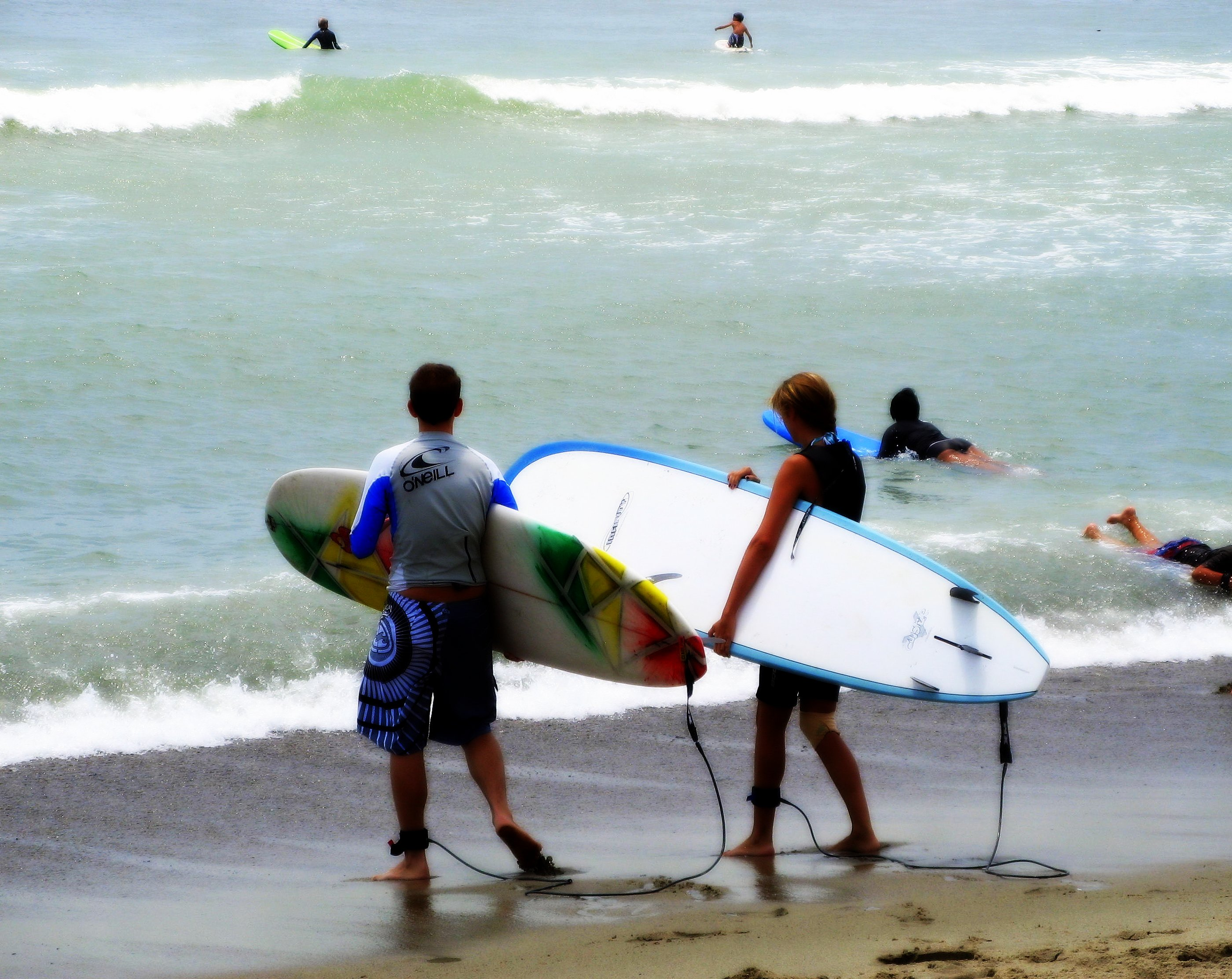
Surfers during the summer at Doheny State Beach

Richard Henry Dana (the author of "Two Years Before the Mast") considered the high bluffs and sheltered coves of this area of Southern California to be the most beautiful spot on the California coast. Pioneering surfers agreed as they surfed the many beach breaks along the coast. Dana Point had a notable surfing history, and was home to many of the first companies that produced products for surfing. Hobie Alter opened the world's first retail surf shop in Dana Point in 1954. Many surf publications such as the Surfer's Journal and Surfer Magazine were formed and headquartered in Dana Point. Bruce Brown produced the iconic surfer film Endless Summer in Dana Point.

"Killer Dana" was a notorious surf break off Dana Point that came out of deep water and broke close to the rocks that lined the beach. The break was destroyed by a breakwater built when the construction of Dana Point Harbor in 1966. A now cuts through the heart of the once epic surf spot. In 1997, the surf group The Chantays recorded an instrumental track named "Killer Dana".

== Geography ==
According to the United States Census Bureau, the city has a total area of 6.8 square miles (18 km^{2}). 6.5 square miles (17 km^{2}) of it is land and 0.26 square miles (0.67 km^{2}) of it (3.91%) is water.

The Dana Point headlands are a prominent feature in Orange County geography and after years of controversy, are currently being developed as a 118-house gated community, however 68 acres (280,000 m^{2}) of the site is open to the public and features a nature center and walking trails exhibiting "lost" plants of the Southern California coast. Views on a clear day extend to Catalina Island and La Jolla in San Diego County.

The city is located 59 miles southeast of Los Angeles, and 65 miles northwest of San Diego. Dana Point is bordered by San Clemente to the southeast, San Juan Capistrano to the northeast, Laguna Beach to the northwest, and Laguna Niguel to the north.

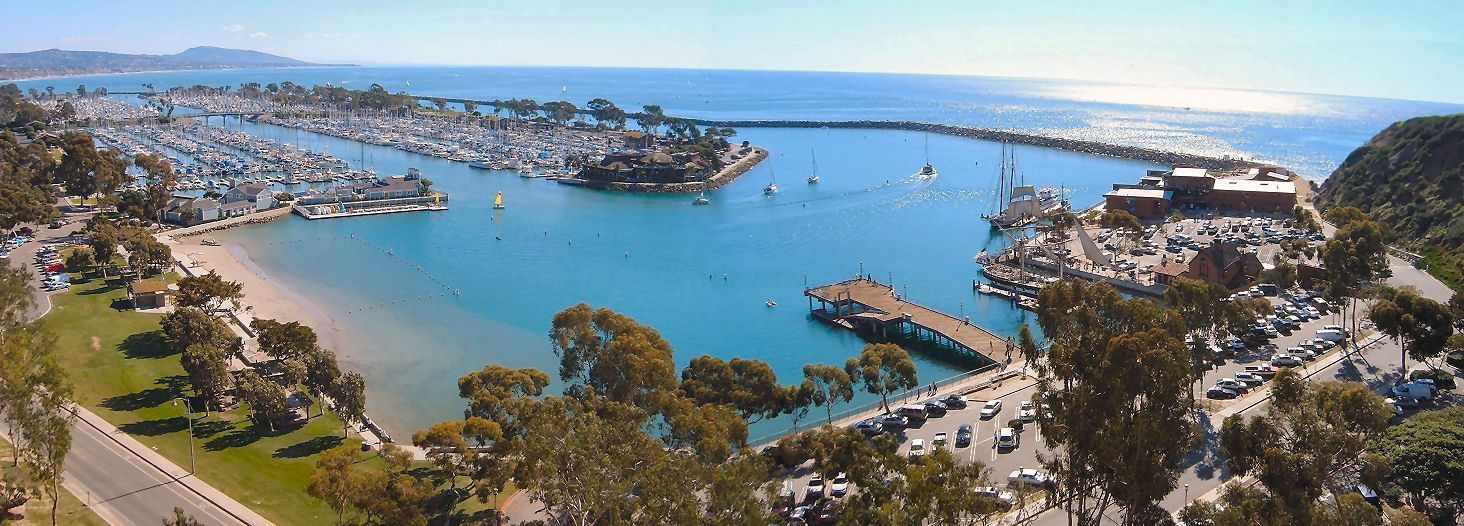
Dana Point harbor as seen from the end of Blue Lantern Street

=== Climate ===
Dana Point enjoys a mild climate with temperatures that tend to average around the 70s. The warmest month of the year is August with an average maximum temperature of 79 °F (26.1 °C). The coldest month is December with an average maximum temperature of 65 °F (18.3 °C). Frost is extremely rare, allowing for a year-round growing season. Annual rainfall (with almost all of it falling between November and March) is about 12 inches (304.8 mm) but is highly variable from year to year.

Climate data for Dana Point, California
Month	Jan	Feb	Mar	Apr	May	Jun	Jul	Aug	Sep	Oct	Nov	Dec	Year
Record high °F (°C)	93 (34)	94 (34)	96 (36)	101 (38)	101 (38)	107 (42)	110 (43)	105 (41)	116 (47)	108 (42)	99 (37)	93 (34)	116 (47)
Mean daily maximum °F (°C)	66 (19)	66 (19)	67 (19)	69 (21)	70 (21)	73 (23)	76 (24)	78 (26)	77 (25)	75 (24)	70 (21)	67 (19)	71 (22)
Mean daily minimum °F (°C)	45 (7)	46 (8)	48 (9)	50 (10)	55 (13)	58 (14)	61 (16)	62 (17)	61 (16)	56 (13)	49 (9)	45 (7)	53 (12)
Record low °F (°C)	25 (−4)	30 (−1)	32 (0)	33 (1)	39 (4)	44 (7)	48 (9)	47 (8)	45 (7)	38 (3)	35 (2)	28 (−2)	25 (−4)
Average precipitation inches (mm)	2.75 (70)	2.81 (71)	2.46 (62)	0.79 (20)	0.24 (6.1)	0.10 (2.5)	0.03 (0.76)	0.12 (3.0)	0.32 (8.1)	0.40 (10)	1.16 (29)	1.73 (44)	12.93 (328)

== Demographics ==
Historical population
Census	Pop.	Note	%±
1960	1,186		—
1970	4,745		300.1%
1980	10,602		123.4%
1990	31,896		200.8%
2000	35,110		10.1%
2010	33,351		−5.0%
2020	33,107		−0.7%
U.S. Decennial Census; 1860–1870 1880–1890; 1900 1910 1920; 1930 1940 1950; 1960 1970 1980; 1990 2000 2010; 2020

Dana Point first appeared as an unincorporated community in the 1960 U.S. census as part of the South Coast census county division. Prior to that, the area was part of unincorporated San Juan Township. The community was redesignated a census designated place in the 1980 United States census and after incorporation, as a city in the 1990 U.S. census.

=== Racial and ethnic composition ===
Dana Point city, California – Racial and Ethnic Composition Note: the US Census treats Hispanic/Latino as an ethnic category. This table excludes Latinos from the racial categories and assigns them to a separate category. Hispanics/Latinos may be of any race.
Race / Ethnicity (NH = Non-Hispanic)	Pop 1980	Pop 1990	Pop 2000	Pop 2010	Pop 2020	% 1980	% 1990	% 2000	% 2010	% 2020
White alone (NH)	9,329	26,453	27,658	25,468	23,463	87.99%	82.94%	78.78%	76.36%	70.87%
Black or African American alone (NH)	72	170	252	255	268	0.68%	0.53%	0.72%	0.76%	0.81%
Native American or Alaska Native alone (NH)	40	129	123	110	66	0.38%	0.40%	0.35%	0.33%	0.20%
Asian alone (NH)	175	685	874	1,037	1,291	1.65%	2.15%	2.49%	3.11%	3.90%
Native Hawaiian or Pacific Islander alone (NH)	175	685	31	37	30	1.65%	2.15%	0.09%	0.11%	0.09%
Other race alone (NH)	7	34	76	63	163	0.07%	0.11%	0.22%	0.19%	0.49%
Mixed race or Multiracial (NH)	x	x	656	719	1,532	x	x	1.87%	2.16%	4.63%
Hispanic or Latino (any race)	979	4,425	5,440	5,662	6,294	9.23%	13.87%	15.49%	16.98%	19.01%
Total	10,602	31,896	35,110	33,351	33,107	100.00%	100.00%	100.00%	100.00%	100.00%

=== 2020 census ===
As of the 2020 census, Dana Point had a population of 33,107. The population density was 5,102.8 inhabitants per square mile (1,970.2/km^{2}).

The age distribution was 15.3% under the age of 18, 7.2% aged 18 to 24, 21.5% aged 25 to 44, 31.4% aged 45 to 64, and 24.5% who were 65 years of age or older. The median age was 49.8 years. For every 100 females, there were 94.1 males, and for every 100 females age 18 and over there were 91.6 males age 18 and over.

The census reported that 99.4% of the population lived in households, 0.5% lived in non-institutionalized group quarters, and 0.2% were institutionalized. Of residents, 100.0% lived in urban areas and 0.0% lived in rural areas.

There were 14,249 households, out of which 20.8% included children under the age of 18. Of all households, 48.8% were married-couple households, 6.4% were cohabiting couple households, 27.3% had a female householder with no spouse or partner present, and 17.5% had a male householder with no spouse or partner present. About 28.3% of households were one person, and 13.1% were one person aged 65 or older. The average household size was 2.31. There were 8,989 families (63.1% of all households).

There were 16,254 housing units at an average density of 2,505.2 units per square mile (967.3 units/km^{2}), of which 14,249 (87.7%) were occupied and 12.3% were vacant. Of occupied units, 58.6% were owner-occupied and 41.4% were occupied by renters. The homeowner vacancy rate was 1.0%, and the rental vacancy rate was 5.4%.

=== 2023 ACS estimates ===
In 2023, the US Census Bureau estimated that the median household income was $127,246, and the per capita income was $78,103. About 6.0% of families and 7.6% of the population were below the poverty line.

=== 2010 census ===
The 2010 United States census reported that Dana Point had a population of 33,351. The population density was 1,131.1 inhabitants per square mile (436.7/km^{2}). The racial makeup of Dana Point was 28,701 (86.1%) White (76.4% Non-Hispanic White), 294 (0.9%) African American, 229 (0.7%) Native American, 1,064 (3.2%) Asian, 37 (0.1%) Pacific Islander, 1,952 (5.9%) from other races, and 1,074 (3.2%) from two or more races. Hispanic or Latino of any race were 5,662 persons (17.0%).

The Census reported that 33,110 people (99.3% of the population) lived in households, 160 (0.5%) lived in non-institutionalized group quarters, and 81 (0.2%) were institutionalized.

There were 14,182 households, out of which 3,459 (24.4%) had children under the age of 18 living in them, 6,902 (48.7%) were opposite-sex married couples living together, 1,232 (8.7%) had a female householder with no husband present, 645 (4.5%) had a male householder with no wife present. There were 780 (5.5%) unmarried opposite-sex partnerships, and 137 (1.0%) same-sex married couples or partnerships. 4,012 households (28.3%) were made up of individuals, and 1,406 (9.9%) had someone living alone who was 65 years of age or older. The average household size was 2.33. There were 8,779 families (61.9% of all households); the average family size was 2.85.

The population was spread out, with 5,959 people (17.9%) under the age of 18, 2,522 people (7.6%) aged 18 to 24, 8,261 people (24.8%) aged 25 to 44, 10,927 people (32.8%) aged 45 to 64, and 5,682 people (17.0%) who were 65 years of age or older. The median age was 44.8 years. For every 100 females, there were 98.2 males. For every 100 females age 18 and over, there were 96.9 males.

There were 15,938 housing units at an average density of 540.6 per square mile (208.7/km^{2}), of which 8,314 (58.6%) were owner-occupied, and 5,868 (41.4%) were occupied by renters. The homeowner vacancy rate was 2.0%; the rental vacancy rate was 7.0%. 19,419 people (58.2% of the population) lived in owner-occupied housing units and 13,691 people (41.1%) lived in rental housing units.

According to the 2010 United States census, Dana Point had a median household income of $80,938, with 8.4% of the population living below the federal poverty line.

== Arts and culture ==
Dana Point has held a Festival of Whales since 1972. This celebration is held over two weekends in March.

The Tall Ships Festival is held in September. It is considered the largest annual gathering of its kind on the West Coast of the United States.

Dana Point has hosted the Dana Point Concours d'Elegance since 2008. The event is located on the Monarch Beach Golf Links and supports various charities.

The Dana Point Grand Prix is an annual criterium bike race overlooking Dana Point Harbor. The course winds its way through downtown Dana Point into Heritage Park and the adjoining residential community with ocean views for participants and spectators before finishing on a long straightaway on PCH.

The Dana Point Chamber of Commerce hosts the annual Turkey Trot, which includes a 5K, 10K and Kids' Gobble Wobble race for ages 5–12, which was voted as a top destination for Thanksgiving by Fodor's Magazine. This event attracts more than 10,000 runners throughout the country and another 5,000 family and friends.

The Dana Point Symphony presents classical music concerts with a 50-piece orchestra and local and international soloists.

=== Marine life ===
Dana Point aerial video

One of a few known specimens of the megamouth shark was caught off Dana Point in 1990. Visitors can visit the Ocean Institute at the harbor below the point and the tidal pools located nearby for a close-up view of marine life during low tide. With the kelp beds located just offshore, Dana Point is a popular destination for snorkelers, fisherman, and spearfishers. Juvenile great white sharks sometimes congregate in the area, but are rarely a threat to humans, mostly feeding on fish. The high cliffs at Dana Point are popular for scanning the horizon for whales, dolphins and other marine life.

Dana Point is home to the longest running Festival of Whales in the World that started in 1971.

Dana Point was trademarked as the Dolphin and Whale Watching Capital of the World® in 2019 and Dana Point was named a Whale Heritage Site in 2021. Prior to Dana Point's designation, this certification was shared with only three other locations in the world and is defined as an outstanding location where cetaceans (whales and dolphins) are embraced through the cultural, economic, social, and political lives of associated communities, and where people and cetaceans coexist in an authentic and respectful way.

== Government ==
Dana Point is a general law city governed as a council-manager form of government.

The city council has five council members, who are elected by area by registered voters of the city. Council members each serve four-year staggered terms. Dana Point has a two-term-limit for elected officials. Annually, the city council appoints a mayor and a mayor pro tem from its own membership to serve a one-year term. The mayor presides over city council meetings, represents the city council at various business and ceremonial events, and executes all city ordinances, resolutions, and contracts. The mayor pro tem performs these duties in the absence of the mayor. As a legislative body, the city council is responsible for the enactment of local laws (ordinances), the adoption of the annual city budget and capital improvement program, and the review and adoption of proposed policies, agreements, contracts, and other city business items.

=== State and federal representation ===
In the California State Legislature, Dana Point is in the 36th senatorial district, represented by Republican Tony Strickland, and in the 74th Assembly district, represented by Republican Laurie Davies.

In the United States House of Representatives, Dana Point is in California's 49th congressional district, represented by Democrat Mike Levin.

=== Politics ===
Since its incorporation as a city, Dana Point has voted for the Republican candidate in every presidential and gubernatorial election as of 2020. According to the California Secretary of State, as of February 10, 2019, Dana Point has 21,844 registered voters. Of those, 9,308 (42.61%) are registered Republicans, 5,758 (26.36%) are registered Democrats, and 5,681 (26.01%) have declined to state a political party/are independents.

Dana Point city vote by party in presidential elections
Year	Democratic	Republican	Third Parties
2020	47.35% 10,102	50.70% 10,816	1.95% 415
2016	42.64% 7,507	50.90% 8,960	6.46% 1,137
2012	39.82% 6,917	57.74% 10,029	2.44% 424
2008	46.41% 8,223	51.32% 9,094	2.27% 403
2004	38.79% 6,841	59.98% 10,579	1.23% 217
2000	36.97% 5,999	58.71% 9,526	4.32% 701
1996	33.88% 4,917	54.16% 7,861	11.96% 1,736
1992	30.65% 5,058	41.22% 6,802	28.13% 4,642

Dana Point city vote by party in gubernatorial elections
Year	Democratic	Republican	Third Parties
2022	43.20% 6,619	56.80% 8,703	
2018	43.03% 7,033	56.97% 9,312	
2014	39.78% 4,031	60.22% 6,102	
2010	33.98% 4,808	60.46% 8,555	5.56% 787
2006	21.48% 2,594	73.67% 8,898	4.85% 586
2003	15.18% 1,999	81.82% 10,777	3.00% 395
2002	30.65% 3,386	61.47% 6,791	7.88% 871
1998	42.48% 5,166	54.80% 6,664	2.72% 331
1994	26.55% 3,514	69.20% 9,159	4.25% 563
1990	32.37% 3,536	62.86% 6,867	4.77% 521

NOTE: The totals listed for the 2003 governor's special election are the aggregate totals for all Republican candidates, all Democratic candidates, and all Independent candidates. Individually, Arnold Schwarzenegger received 8,862 votes, Cruz Bustamante received 1,907 votes, Tom McClintock received 1,838 votes, and Peter Uberroth received 50 votes.

== Education ==
The city is served by Capistrano Unified School District. It includes Dana Hills High School, one of the oldest high schools in the area, which opened in 1972. The cross country program at Dana Hills High School won California state titles in 1988, 2007, 2008, and 2009.

== Emergency services ==
Fire protection in Dana Point is provided by the Orange County Fire Authority with ambulance service by Doctor's Ambulance. Law enforcement is provided by the Orange County Sheriff's Department.

Year-round marine safety services are provided by US Ocean Safety, d.b.a. OC Lifeguards, on the county beaches, and California state lifeguards on the state beaches.

== Media ==
Dana Point is served by two newspapers, the Dana Point News, owned by the Orange County Register, and the Dana Point Times, published by Picket Fence Media. Both papers run once weekly.

The Laguna Niguel-Dana Point Patch is an online-only news website that also serves Dana Point along with its neighbor, Laguna Niguel.

== Notable people ==
- Eric Allaman – American composer
- Josh Allen – American football player (born 1996)
- Bill Brough – American politician (born 1966)
- Dana Brown – American surfer and filmmaker
- Melinda Clarke – American actress (born 1969)
- Hans Crouse – American baseball player (born 1998)
- Melanie Watson Bernhardt – American actress (1968–2025)
- Sam Darnold – American football player (born 1997)
- Daryl Gates – American police chief (1926–2010)
- Andrew McMahon – American musician
- Chase Strumpf – American baseball player (born 1998)
- Bernadette Withers – American actress (1946–2019)

== Sister City ==
- Sorrento, Italy
