= Prize Cases =

- Supreme Court of the United States

Argued February 10, 1863 Decided March 10, 1863
- Full case name: The Brig Amy Warwick; The Schooner Crenshaw; The Barque Hiawatha; The Schooner Brilliante.
- Citations: 67 U.S. 635 (more) 2 Black 635; 17 L. Ed. 459; 1862 U.S. LEXIS 282

Holding
- The President did have the authority to order a blockade and impound ships, even without a formal declaration of war.

Court membership
- Chief Justice Roger B. Taney Associate Justices James M. Wayne · John Catron; Samuel Nelson · Robert C. Grier; Nathan Clifford · Noah H. Swayne; Samuel F. Miller · David Davis

Case opinions
- Majority: Grier, joined by Wayne, Swayne, Miller, Davis
- Dissent: Nelson, joined by Taney, Catron, Clifford

Laws applied
- Militia Acts of 1792 and 1795, Insurrection Act of 1807

The Prize Cases, 67 U.S. (2 Black) 635 (1863), were a group of four United States Supreme Court cases that upheld President Abraham Lincoln's authority to blockade Southern ports during the American Civil War. The opinion in the case was written by Supreme Court Justice Robert Cooper Grier.

== Background ==
Facing the secession of several states from the Union and the possibility of open hostilities, Abraham Lincoln did not ask Congress to declare war on the Confederate States of America, as he believed that doing so would be tantamount to recognizing the Confederacy as a nation. Instead, Lincoln instituted a naval blockade, which had important legal ramifications because nations do not blockade their own ports; rather, they close them. By ordering a blockade, Lincoln essentially declared the Confederacy to be belligerents instead of insurrectionists.

The Confederate States were mostly agrarian, and almost all of their machined and manufactured goods were imported. At the beginning of the war there was only one significant steel mill and manufactory in the South, the Tredegar Iron Works in Richmond, Virginia. Moreover, the Southern economy depended on the export of cotton, tobacco, and other crops. The blockade of the South resulted in the capture of dozens of American and foreign ships, both those attempting to run the highly efficient blockade and smuggle goods and munitions to the South as well as those attempting to smuggle exports from the South.

== Supreme Court ==
The question before the court dealt with the seized ships, but it reached widely into the legality of wars against acts of belligerence, whether or not officially declared. It rose through the lower federal courts through lawsuits by Northern merchants whose ships were seized by U.S. Navy warships enforcing the blockade. In admiralty, a ship captured during war may be kept as a prize. If there is no formal war, capturing ships and impounding them is piracy. Plaintiffs contended that the blockade was not legal because a war had not been declared, thus making it perfectly legal to run the blockade and sell war materiel in the blockaded Southern ports. The government's case was argued by U.S. Attorneys Charles Eames, William Evarts, and Richard Henry Dana Jr., the author of Two Years Before the Mast, whose "argument was thought by many to be the most effective of all". On March 10, 1863, the Court ruled that the states of the Southern Confederacy were in insurrection and at war against the United States by acts of belligerency on April 12 and April 17, 1861, to wit: the firing upon Fort Sumter and the Privateering Act proclaimed by Confederate President Jefferson Davis. Lincoln's Proclamation of Blockade was made on April 19, 1861 (Navy Official Records, Series 1, Volume 5, page 620), two days after Davis's call for privateers, and it was founded upon acting against privateers, not an open policy of warfare as was later recommended by Winfield Scott, the ranking General of the Army.

In making its decision, the Court looked to recent British interpretations of international law, and concluded that the Southern Confederacy was indeed a belligerent, but a belligerent did not have to be a nation and furthermore that the Civil War was a war, whether declared or not. Justice Robert Grier wrote the 5-4 majority opinion, stating "[I]t is not necessary to constitute war, that both parties should be acknowledged as independent nations or sovereign States." While the court acknowledged that the United States Congress had, in July 1861, adopted a law ratifying and approving the President's proclamation after the fact, as well as other actions taken since then to prosecute the war, that was not the point. Grier also wrote "The President was bound to meet it [the war] in the shape it presented itself, without waiting for Congress to baptize it with a name." By this decision, the Supreme Court upheld the President's executive powers to act in accordance with the Presidential oath of office, "to preserve, protect and defend the Constitution of the United States" and to act expediently as the Commander-in-Chief in time of war—a de facto war existing since April 12, 1861.

=== Dissent ===
The dissenting opinion by Justice Samuel Nelson, which Chief Justice Roger Taney and two other justices joined, noted that the President is not given authority by the Constitution to declare war; the power to declare war lies with Congress. The Civil War did not exist until it was declared so by Congress. Lincoln ordered the blockade before Congress had declared a war. As such, Nelson and the minority believed that the blockade was unconstitutional. They also contended that, even had Lincoln been granted the authority for the blockade, he would have had to provide the neutral parties with a proper notice of seizure.
