= Melanie Watson Bernhardt =

American actress (1968–2025)

- Born: Melanie Lynn Watson; July 20, 1968; Dana Point, California, U.S.
- Died: December 26, 2025 (aged 57); Colorado Springs, Colorado, U.S.
- Occupations: Actress, disability advocate
- Years active: 1981–1984
- Spouse: Robert Bernhardt (m. 1994; div. 1996)

Melanie Lynn Watson Bernhardt (July 20, 1968 – December 26, 2025) was an American actress and disability advocate known for her role as Kathy Gordon on the sitcom Diff'rent Strokes.

== Life and career ==
Melanie Lynn Watson was born in Dana Point, California on July 20, 1968, the daughter of Jack Watson and Marilyn Patzner. She was diagnosed with osteogenesis imperfecta at birth and used a wheelchair.

Watson Bernhardt died in Colorado Springs, Colorado on December 26, 2025, at the age of 57.
