= Two Years Before the Mast =

1840 book by Richard Henry Dana Jr

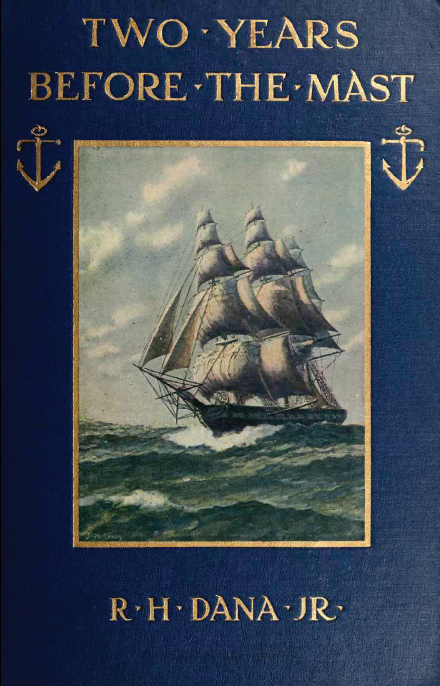
- 1911 Houghton Mifflin Edition
- Author: Richard Henry Dana Jr.
- Language: English
- Genre: Diary, novel
- Publisher: Harper and Brothers
- Publication date: 1840
- Publication place: United States
- Media type: Print (Hardback and Paperback)
- Pages: 415

Two Years Before the Mast is a memoir by the American author Richard Henry Dana Jr., published in 1840, having been written after a two-year sea voyage from Boston to California on a merchant ship starting in 1834. A film adaptation under the same name was released in 1946.

== The journey ==
=== Outbound ===
In the book, which takes place between 1834 and 1836, Dana gives a vivid account of "the life of a common sailor at sea as it really is." He sails from Boston to South America and around Cape Horn to California. Dana's brig was on a voyage to trade goods from the United States for the Mexican colonial Californian California missions' and ranchos' cow hides. They traded at the ports in San Diego Bay, San Pedro Bay, Santa Barbara Channel, Monterey Bay, and San Francisco Bay. The provenance of this history is well supported by records showing the company of Sprague and James building and launching a brig named Pilgrim in 1825 in Medford, Massachusetts.

=== California ===
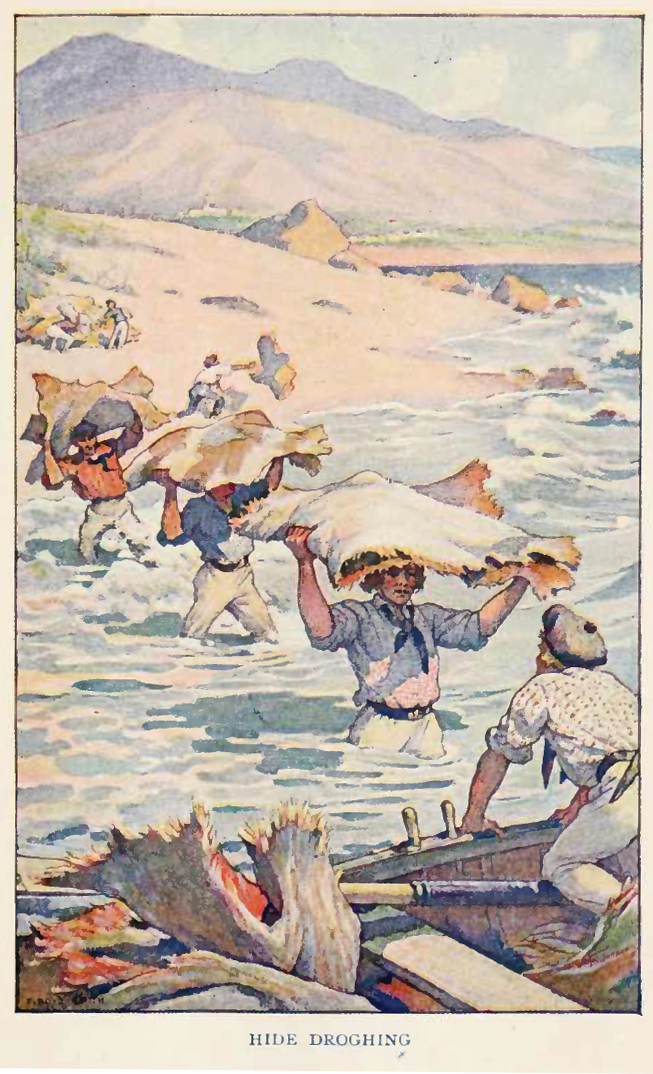
California hide trade: droughing (carrying) hides from an Alta California shore to boat, for export

Dana arrived in Alta California when it was a province of Mexico, and no longer Spanish colonial Las Californias. He gives descriptions of landing at each of the ports up and down the California coast as they existed then. The ports served (south to north) Mission San Diego de Alcalá, Mission San Juan Capistrano, Pueblo de Los Angeles (and Mission San Gabriel Arcángel), Mission Santa Barbara (and Presidio of Santa Barbara), Presidio of Monterey, and Presidio of San Francisco with their very small settlements and surrounding large Mexican land grant ranchos. He also describes the coastal indigenous peoples, the Mexican Californios culture, and the immigrants' and traders' influences from other locales.

Dana's account of his on-shore experience with the hide trade is a significant topic in the book, relating his difficult work with hide curing in San Diego and as a hide drogher transporting cowhides from the Dana Point headland bluffs (delivered from Mission San Juan Capistrano) to the beach below, through the surf, out to rowboats, and loaded into the ship's cargo hold. Dana describes the difficult process on the Dana Point headland bluffs where cowhides were flung with great strength far enough out to the beach below to avoid them catching on the cliff outcrops, a process he compared to flying a kite without a string. F. Benedict Coleman's bronze sculpture The Hide Drogher, installed at the same Dana Point headlands cliffs, intentionally illustrates Dana's account with a realistic life-size statue/sculpture. Some hides, however, would get stuck part way down the cliff, and Dana also described the dangerous task of being lowered with ropes to dislodge them.

The headlands, along with the adjacent present day city, took on Dana's name as Dana Point.

Dana learned Spanish from the Californian Mexicans and became an interpreter for his ship. He befriended Kanaka (native people of the Sandwich Islands—Hawaiian Islands) sailors in the ports, one of whose lives Dana would save when his captain would as soon see him die. He was a witness to two floggings of Pilgrim crew members by Captain Thompson, which he believed to be undeserved and unjustified, but was powerless to do anything about them, as the captain was the law aboard ship. He spent a season on the San Diego shore preparing hides for shipment to Boston, and his journey home. Dana also makes a tellingly accurate prediction of San Francisco's future growth and significance.

=== Homebound ===
Of the return trip around Cape Horn, on his new ship the Alert, but with the same Captain Thompson, in the middle of the Antarctic winter, Dana gives the classic account. He describes terrifying storms and incredible beauty, giving vivid descriptions of icebergs, which he calls incomparable. The most incredible part perhaps is the weeks and weeks it took to negotiate passage against winds and storms—all the while having to race up and down the ice-covered rigging to furl and unfurl sails. At one point he has an infected tooth, and his face swells up so that he is unable to work for several days, despite the need for all hands. Upon reaching Staten Island (known today as Isla de los Estados), they know they have nearly come around the Horn. After the Horn has been rounded he describes the scurvy that afflicts members of the crew. There is another flogging by the captain, this time of the steward, for fighting and threatening to spill blood, but Dana seems to believe it was more justified than the previous incident in California. In White-Jacket, Herman Melville wrote, "But if you want the best idea of Cape Horn, get my friend Dana's unmatchable Two Years Before the Mast. But you can read, and so you must have read it. His chapters describing Cape Horn must have been written with an icicle."

In his Concluding Chapter, Dana discusses his thoughts on the captain's use of corporal punishment, the possibility of laws to limit the captain's power, contrasting with the necessity of the captain to have complete authority and control of the ship, the rights of seamen, contrasting with their general reputation as a class, and aspects of any legal recourse they might have in bringing an abusive captain to justice. He also advances his ideas of promoting more religious instruction among seamen, Sunday religious observance by captains, and the benefits to be derived by more compassionate captains and religiously disciplined seamen, in bringing the men to more willingness to obey orders, which he believed would greatly reduce the necessity and incidence of punishment.

=== Afterwards ===
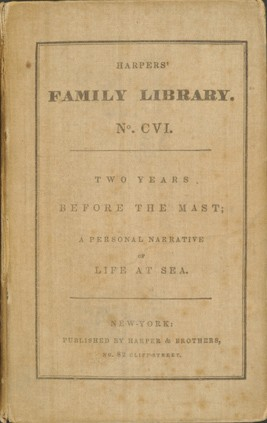
First edition of Two Years Before the Mast, 1840

In 1869, Dana published a new edition which removed some content from the original and added an appendix entitled "Twenty-Four Years After". This appendix recounts his visit to California in 1859, after the Gold Rush, by which time the state had been totally transformed. During this trip, he revisited some of the sites mentioned in the book as well as seeing old friends, including some that had been mentioned in the book, and others he did not like, such as the company agent he had worked with, Alfred Robinson, who by this time was himself an author of a book on California. Dana expressed gratitude to Robinson for being polite to him, even though Dana had not been kind to him in his book. He visited the Fremont mining operations in Mariposa County. Along with Jessie Fremont and her party, he went to Yosemite Valley. Stopping along the way at Clark's Station in Wawona, he described Galen Clark as a gracious host.

Dana also included the subsequent personal histories of Captain Thompson and many of the officers and crew members of Pilgrim and Alert.

A final note records the fate of his ship, the Alert. In 1862 during the Civil War, it was captured by the Confederate commerce raider Alabama, the crew were forced into the boats, and the ship was destroyed.

== Publication history ==
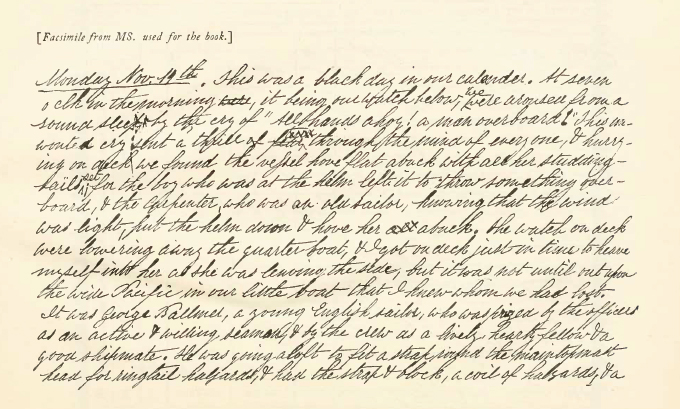
Facsimile of an original manuscript page of the book (beginning of chapter VI) in Richard Henry Dana's hand

Dana's father first approached Harper and Brothers, as they were his publishers, though the Danas rejected the original offer for 10 percent in royalties after the first 1,000 sold. The manuscript, originally titled Journal, was rejected by four publishing houses after that offer from Harpers in 1839. Two Years Before the Mast was finally published in September 1840 in two versions, without credit to Dana on the title page. Dana had asked for assistance from the poet William Cullen Bryant, whose poem "Thanatopsis" was praised by Dana's father. Bryant again brought the manuscript to Harper's, hoping they would pay $500 to its author, though they ultimately paid Dana only $250 along with 24 complimentary copies. Though the book sold 10,000 copies during its first year, Dana did not receive any royalties from sales of this edition of the book.

In 1911, Dana's son, Richard Henry Dana III, added an introduction detailing the "subsequent story and fate of the vessels, and of some of the persons with whom the reader is made acquainted."

In 1909 Harvard University president Charles W. Eliot selected Two Years Before the Mast as Volume 23 of the Harvard Classics, a collection of notable literature.

== Two Years Before the Mast as literature ==
Two Years Before the Mast was "conceived as a protest and written to improve the lot of the common sailor". The literary style provides a concrete description of a seaman's life to serve as a practical guide, and not as an adventure novel. His unpolished, laconic style achieved a literary quality, however, that influenced novelist Herman Melville, according to American essayist Wright Morris. In the following excerpt from Dana's diary, the entry expresses not only chronological information, but how a seaman "apprehends time".

Monday, Nov. 10th. During a part of this day we were hove to, but the rest of the time were driving on, under close-reefed sails, with a heavy sea, a strong gale, and frequent squalls of hail and snow.

Tuesday, Nov. 11th. The same.

Wednesday. The same.

Thursday. The same.

This following passage, describing Dana's first sighting of an iceberg off Cape Horn, "reminds us of Melville" and "other passages seem to anticipate him". (Melville, born in 1819, was exactly four years Dana's junior, and returned from his first tour as a seaman when Two Years Before the Mast was first published in 1840):

And there lay, floating in the ocean, several miles off, an immense, irregular mass, its top and points covered with snow, and its centre of a deep indigo color.... As far as the eye could reach, the sea in every direction was of a deep blue color, the waves running high and fresh, and sparkling in the light, and in the midst lay this immense mountain-island, its cavities and valleys thrown into deep shade, and its points and pinnacles glittering in the sun....But no description can give any idea of the strangeness, splendor, and, really, the sublimity, of the sight. Its great size... its slow motion, as its base rose and sank in the water, and its high points nodded against the clouds; the dashing of the waves upon it, which, breaking high with foam, lined its base with a white crust; and the thundering sound of the cracking of the mass, and the breaking and tumbling down of huge pieces; together with its nearness and approach, which added a slight element of fear,—all combined to give to it the character of true sublimity.

The following description of the English sailor, Bill Jackson, has literary similarities to Melville's Billy Budd:

He was tall; but you only perceived it when he was standing by the side of others, for the great breadth of his shoulders and chest made him appear but little above the middle height. His chest was as deep as it was wide; his arm like that of Hercules; and his hand "the fist of a tar—every hair a rope-yarn." With all this he had one of the pleasantest smiles I ever saw. His cheeks were of a handsome brown; his teeth brilliantly white; and his hair, of a raven black, waved in loose curls all over his head, and fine, open forehead; and his eyes he might have sold to a duchess at the price of diamonds, for their brilliancy...Take him with his well-varnished black tarpaulin stuck upon the back of his head; his long locks coming down almost into his eyes; his white duck trousers and shirt; blue jacket; and black kerchief, tied loosely round his neck; and he was a fine specimen of manly beauty... His strength must have been great, and he had the sight of a vulture. It is strange that one should be so minute in the description of an unknown, outcast sailor, whom one may never see again, and whom no one may care to hear about; but so it is. Some people we see under no remarkable circumstances, but whom, for some reason or other, we never forget. He called himself Bill Jackson... .

Writes Morris, "Dana is something more of a poet than either he or his contemporaries were aware; and that his ignorance of this gift was a loss to him as well as to us."

== Legacy ==
A film adaptation was released in 1946.

The story was adapted into comic book form by Classics Illustrated in 1941 and 1947.

In Chapter 7 of his Is Shakespeare Dead?, Mark Twain contrasts passages from Dana's book with a passage from The Tempest to demonstrate Shakespeare's lack of seafaring knowledge, which is then further contrasted with Shakespeare's correct usage of legal terminology.

== See also ==
- Ocean Institute – owned a replica of the brig Pilgrim until it sank and was demolished in 2020
- History of California through 1899
- Casa De San Pedro Hide House
