= List of United States Supreme Court cases, volume 67 =

Supreme Court of the United States
- Interactive map of Supreme Court of the United States
- 38°53′26″N 77°00′16″W
- Established: March 4, 1789; 236 years ago
- Location: Washington, D.C.
- Coordinates: 38°53′26″N 77°00′16″W
- Composition method: Presidential nomination with Senate confirmation
- Authorised by: Constitution of the United States, Art. III, § 1
- Judge term length: life tenure, subject to impeachment and removal
- Number of positions: 9 (by statute)
- Website: supremecourt.gov

This is a list of cases reported in volume 67 (2 Black) of United States Reports, decided by the Supreme Court of the United States in 1862 and 1863.

== Nominative reports ==
In 1874, the U.S. government created the United States Reports, and retroactively numbered older privately published case reports as part of the new series. As a result, cases appearing in volumes 1–90 of U.S. Reports have dual citation forms; one for the volume number of U.S. Reports, and one for the volume number of the reports named for the relevant reporter of decisions (these are called "nominative reports").

=== Jeremiah Sullivan Black ===
Starting with the 66th volume of U.S. Reports, the Reporter of Decisions of the Supreme Court of the United States was Jeremiah S. Black. Black was Reporter of Decisions from 1861 to 1862, covering volumes 66 and 67 of United States Reports which correspond to volumes 1 and 2 of his Black's Reports. As such, the dual form of citation to, for example, Gilman v. City of Sheboygan is 67 U.S. (2 Black) 510 (1863).

== Justices of the Supreme Court at the time of 67 U.S. (2 Black) ==
The Supreme Court is established by Article III, Section 1 of the Constitution of the United States, which says: "The judicial Power of the United States, shall be vested in one supreme Court . . .". The size of the Court is not specified; the Constitution leaves it to Congress to set the number of justices. Under the Judiciary Act of 1789 Congress originally fixed the number of justices at six (one chief justice and five associate justices). Since 1789 Congress has varied the size of the Court from six to seven, nine, ten, and back to nine justices (always including one chief justice).

When the cases in 67 U.S. (2 Black) were decided the Court comprised these nine members:

Portrait	Justice	Office	Home State	Succeeded	Date confirmed by the Senate (Vote)	Tenure on Supreme Court
	Roger B. Taney	Chief Justice	Maryland	John Marshall	March 15, 1836 (29–15)	March 28, 1836 – October 12, 1864 (Died)
	James Moore Wayne	Associate Justice	Georgia	William Johnson	January 9, 1835 (Acclamation)	January 14, 1835 – July 5, 1867 (Died)
	John Catron	Associate Justice	Tennessee	newly created seat	March 8, 1837 (28–15)	May 1, 1837 – May 30, 1865 (Died)
	Samuel Nelson	Associate Justice	New York	Smith Thompson	February 14, 1845 (Acclamation)	February 27, 1845 – November 28, 1872 (Retired)
	Robert Cooper Grier	Associate Justice	Pennsylvania	Henry Baldwin	August 4, 1846 (Acclamation)	August 10, 1846 – January 31, 1870 (Retired)
	Nathan Clifford	Associate Justice	Maine	Benjamin Robbins Curtis	January 12, 1858 (26–23)	January 21, 1858 – July 25, 1881 (Died)
	Noah Haynes Swayne	Associate Justice	Ohio	John McLean	January 24, 1862 (38–1)	January 27, 1862 – January 24, 1881 (Retired)
	Samuel Freeman Miller	Associate Justice	Iowa	Peter Vivian Daniel	July 16, 1862 (Acclamation)	July 21, 1862 – October 13, 1890 (Died)
	David Davis	Associate Justice	Illinois	John Archibald Campbell	December 8, 1862 (Acclamation)	December 10, 1862 – March 4, 1877 (Resigned)

== Notable Cases in 67 U.S. (2 Black) ==
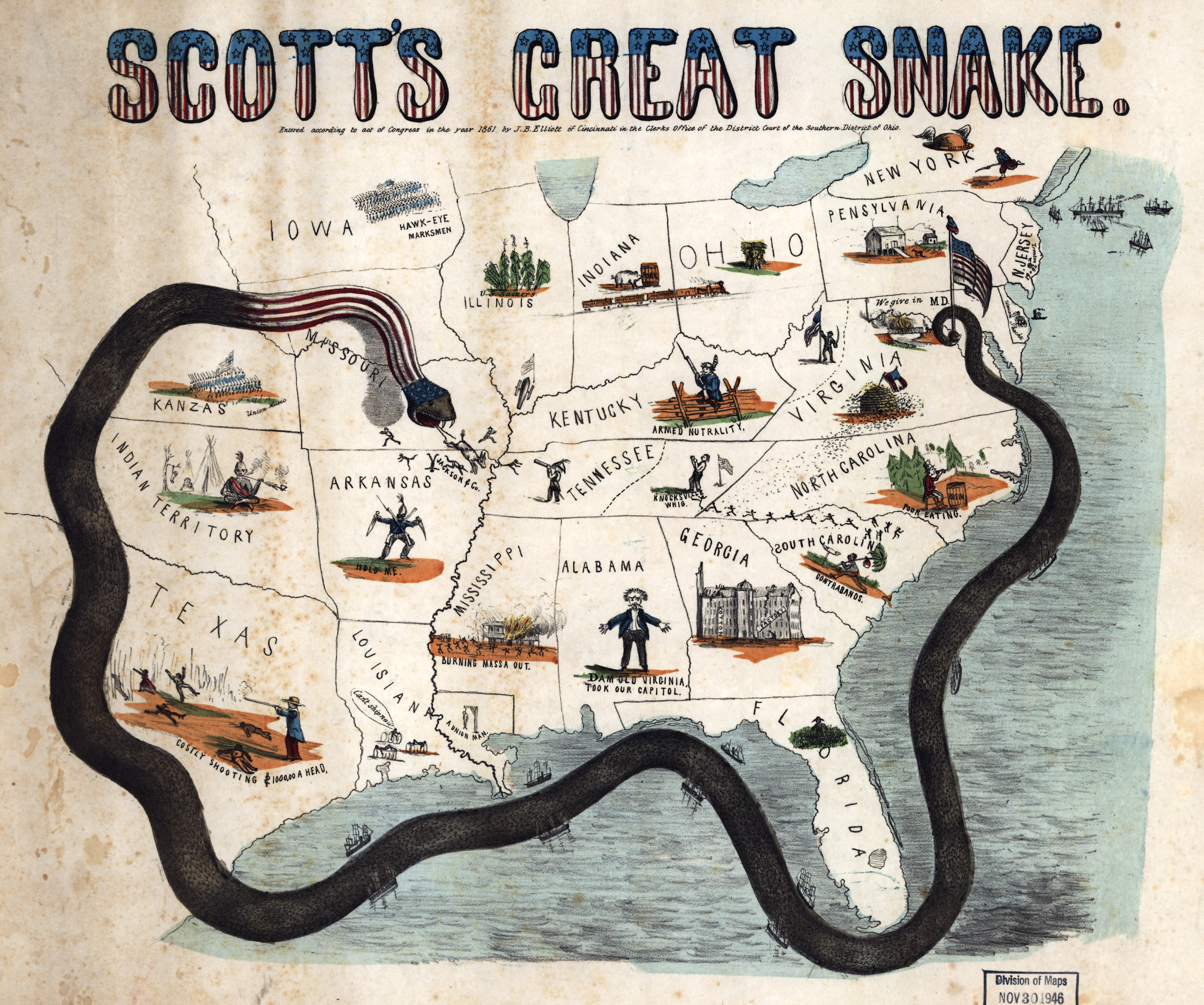
Cartoon of Union blockade

=== Prize Cases ===
In the Prize Cases, 67 U.S. (2 Black) 635 (1863) the Supreme Court held, 5–4, that the blockade of the Southern ports ordered by President Abraham Lincoln during the American Civil War was constitutional. The blockade of the South resulted in the capture of dozens of American and foreign ships, both those attempting to run the highly efficient blockade and smuggle goods and munitions to the South, as well as those attempting to smuggle exports from the South.

== Citation style ==
Under the Judiciary Act of 1789 the federal court structure at the time comprised District Courts, which had general trial jurisdiction; Circuit Courts, which had mixed trial and appellate (from the US District Courts) jurisdiction; and the United States Supreme Court, which had appellate jurisdiction over the federal District and Circuit courts—and for certain issues over state courts. The Supreme Court also had limited original jurisdiction (i.e., in which cases could be filed directly with the Supreme Court without first having been heard by a lower federal or state court). There were one or more federal District Courts and/or Circuit Courts in each state, territory, or other geographical region.

Bluebook citation style is used for case names, citations, and jurisdictions.

- "C.C.D." = United States Circuit Court for the District of . . .
  - e.g.,"C.C.D.N.J." = United States Circuit Court for the District of New Jersey
- "D." = United States District Court for the District of . . .
  - e.g.,"D. Mass." = United States District Court for the District of Massachusetts
- "E." = Eastern; "M." = Middle; "N." = Northern; "S." = Southern; "W." = Western
  - e.g.,"C.C.S.D.N.Y." = United States Circuit Court for the Southern District of New York
  - e.g.,"M.D. Ala." = United States District Court for the Middle District of Alabama
- "Ct. Cl." = United States Court of Claims
- The abbreviation of a state's name alone indicates the highest appellate court in that state's judiciary at the time.
  - e.g.,"Pa." = Supreme Court of Pennsylvania
  - e.g.,"Me." = Supreme Judicial Court of Maine

== List of cases in 67 U.S. (2 Black) ==
Case Name	Page & year	Opinion of the Court	Concurring opinion(s)	Dissenting opinion(s)	Lower Court	Disposition
United States v. Castillero	17 (1863)	Clifford	none	Catron; Wayne	N.D. Cal.	multiple
Calais S.B. Co. v. Scudder	372 (1863)	Nelson	Miller	Miller; Clifford	C.C.D. Me.	reversed
United States v. Galbraith	394 (1863)	Nelson	none	none	N.D. Cal.	reversed
King v. Ackerman	408 (1863)	Grier	none	none	C.C.S.D.N.Y.	affirmed
City of Chicago v. Robbins	418 (1863)	Davis	none	none	C.C.N.D. Ill.	reversed
Ward v. Chamberlain	430 (1863)	Clifford	none	Grier	C.C.N.D. Ohio	certification
Wabash et al. Co. v. Beers	448 (1863)	Miller	none	none	C.C.D. Ind.	reversed
Chilton v. Braiden's Adm'x	458 (1863)	Grier	none	none	C.C.D.C.	affirmed
Curtis's Adm'x v. Fiedler	461 (1863)	Clifford	none	none	C.C.S.D.N.Y.	reversed
Taylor v. Morton	481 (1863)	Clifford	none	none	C.C.D. Mass.	affirmed
Mississippi & M.R.R. Co. v. Ward	485 (1863)	Catron	none	Nelson	D. Iowa	dismissed
Noonan v. Lee	499 (1863)	Swayne	none	none	D. Wis.	multiple
Gilman v. City of Sheboygan	510 (1863)	Swayne	none	none	D. Wis.	reversed
Griffing v. Gibb	519 (1863)	Wayne	none	none	N.D. Cal.	reversed
Bronson v. La Crosse & M.R.R. Co.	524 (1863)	Davis	none	none	C.C.D. Wis.	dismissal denied
Sumner v. Hicks	532 (1863)	Swayne	none	none	D. Wis.	affirmed
Wright v. Bales	535 (1863)	Wayne	none	none	C.C.S.D. Ohio	reversed
Ogilvie v. Knox Ins. Co.	539 (1863)	Grier	none	none	C.C.D. Ind.	dismissed
Callan v. May	541 (1863)	Taney	none	none	C.C.D.C.	dismissed
Wright v. Sill	544 (1863)	Swayne	none	none	C.C.N.D. Ohio	affirmed
Parker v. Winnipiseogee et al. Co.	545 (1863)	Swayne	none	none	C.C.D.N.H.	affirmed
Lindsey v. Hawes	554 (1863)	Miller	none	none	C.C.N.D. Ill.	reversed
Dredge v. Forsyth	563 (1862)	Clifford	none	none	C.C.N.D. Ill.	reversed
Kellogg v. Forsyth	571 (1862)	Clifford	none	none	C.C.N.D. Ill.	reversed
Congdon & T.M. Co. v. Goodman	574 (1862)	Taney	none	none	Tenn.	dismissed
Russell v. Ely	575 (1862)	Miller	none	none	D. Wis.	affirmed
The Ship Potomac	581 (1862)	Grier	none	none	C.C.S.D.N.Y.	affirmed
Randall v. Howard	585 (1863)	Davis	none	none	C.C.D. Md.	affirmed
City of Nebraska City v. Campbell	590 (1863)	Nelson	none	none	Sup. Ct. Terr. Neb.	affirmed
United States v. Chaboya	593 (1863)	Miller	none	none	N.D. Cal.	affirmed
Leffingwell v. Warren	599 (1862)	Swayne	none	none	D. Wis.	reversed
Parrish's Lessee v. Ferris	606 (1863)	Nelson	none	none	C.C.S.D. Ohio	affirmed
United States v. Grimes	610 (1863)	Grier	none	none	N.D. Cal.	reversed
Rothwell v. Dewees	613 (1863)	Miller	none	none	C.C.D.C.	affirmed
People ex rel. Bank of Comm. v. City of New York	620 (1863)	Nelson	none	none	N.Y.	reversed
Prize Cases	635 (1863)	Grier	none	Nelson	multiple	multiple
Appleton v. Bacon	699 (1863)	Nelson	none	none	C.C.D.C.	reversed
De Krafft v. Barney	704 (1863)	Taney	none	none	C.C.D.C.	dismissed
Koehler v. Black River F.I. Co.	715 (1863)	Davis	none	none	D. Wis.	affirmed
Mesa v. United States	721 (1863)	per curiam	none	none	not indicated	dismissed
Moran v. Miami Cnty.	722 (1863)	Wayne	none	none	C.C.D. Ind.	reversed

== See also ==
certificate of division
