= California hide trade =

Trading system in Mexican California

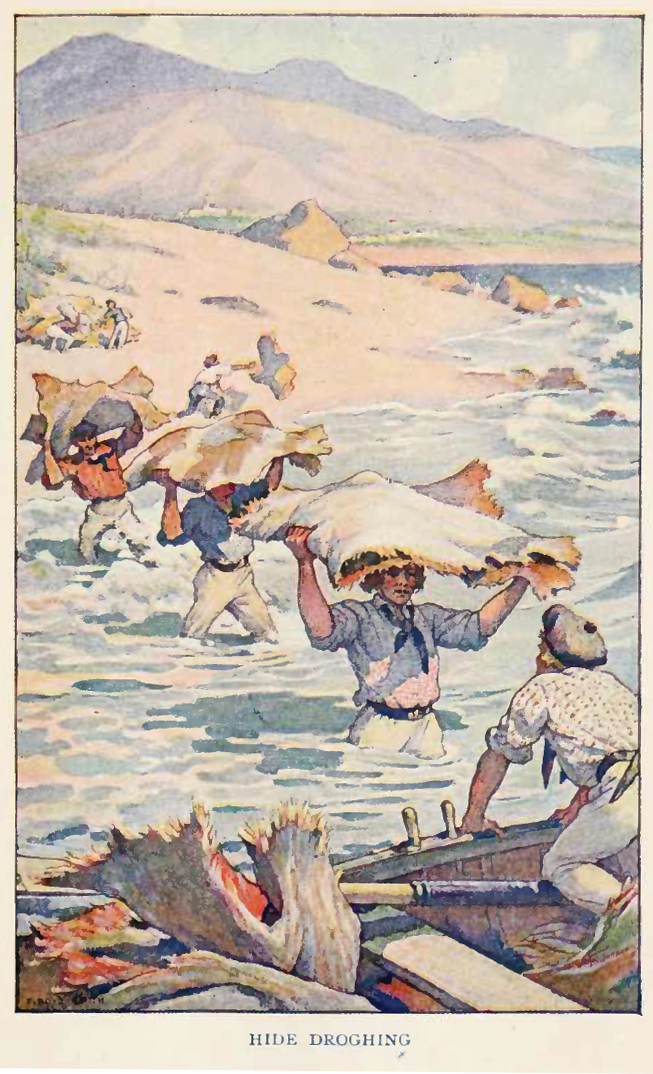
Illustration from the 1840 book Two Years Before the Mast

The California hide trade was a trading system of various products based in cities along the California coastline, operating from the early 1820s to the mid-1840s.

In exchange for hides and tallow from cattle owned by California ranchers, sailors from around the globe, often representing corporations, swapped finished goods of all kinds. The trade was the essential constituent of the region’s economy at the time, and encompassed cities extending from Canton to Lima to Boston, and involved many nations including Russia, Mexico, the United States, and the United Kingdom.

Sailing ships purchased each hide for one American dollar, to sell for a profit at a distant port. Such hides were sold for three dollars in Boston where shoemakers finished the leather.

== Process of trade ==
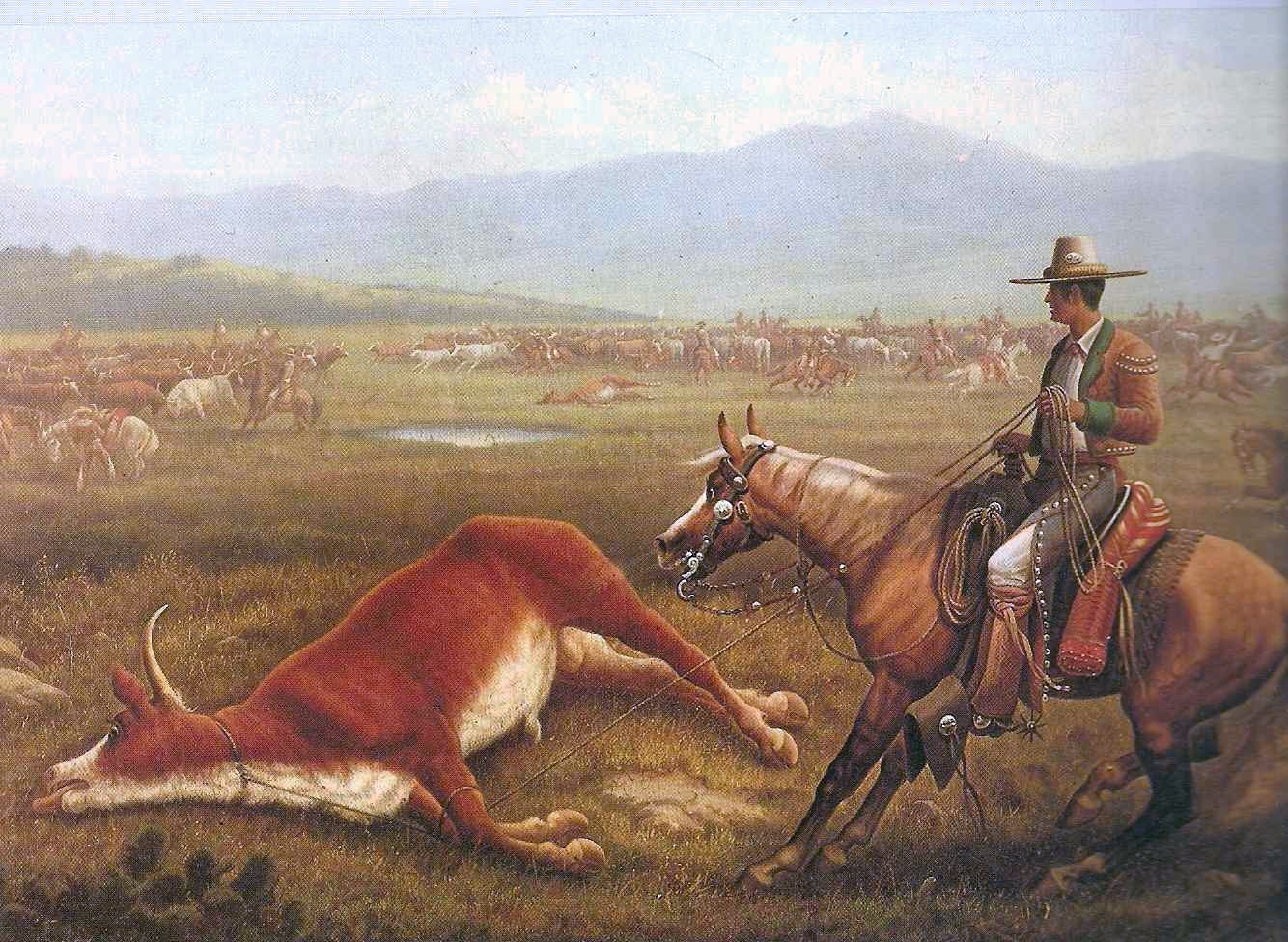
A Californio rancher takes in cattle, a duty that would begin the process of the California Hide Trade.

The California hide trade was based on the export of hide, horns and tallow during the early nineteenth century from around 1810. Rancheros (affluent cattle farmers) and their vaqueros (cowboys) cared for free-ranging livestock along the California seaboard with the help of a Native American workforce. The cattle were not only the source of their food and many common supplies, but also their economy and livelihood. The hides of the cattle were taken to the shore and fat from the cattle was liquefied and separated into tallow, collected in repositories crafted from hides known as botas. Both goods would be stockpiled near hub ports like San Diego and Monterey to await sale to international trading vessels.

Constituting the most widely traded good, the California hides were often known as “California banknotes” due to their common use as a medium of exchange. Richard Henry Dana wrote that sailors called the hides "California dollars". They would first need to be cured, cleaned, stretched, dried in the summer sun, whipped, salted, and folded, a long and tedious process completed by sailors themselves with the aid of Native Americans and the Hawaiian Kanaka peoples, together called “droghers”. Then they would be taken onto boats and rowed out to the ships, bound for Boston and the Northeast, where they would be crafted for use into leather-based goods like shoes and boots. The tallow, on the other hand, was shipped to South American countries such as Peru and Chile and used to make candles and soap.

In order to take part in the exchange itself, the Mexican government, which ruled California at this time, instituted a fee for foreign ships to pay upon entry into the coastal waters, a fee often manipulated and avoided by trading captains through subterfuge and bribery of collectors. A tariff system charging up to 15,000 pesos enacted by the Mexican government would be paid at the customs house at Monterey, which allowed trading vessels to buy and sell goods at all of the California ports. To be able to evade the tariff was considered the mark of a professional and a badge of honor by many captains of the day. Predominantly American vessels, which negotiated high tariffs on their payloads via honest or dishonest means, often saw returns three times the value of the cargo which they brought.

The settlers (Spanish speakers born in the area became known as Californios) were able to purchase any number of manufactured products from trading ships – notably described by the writer Richard Henry Dana as “floating department stores”. Products purchased by the Californios and others were diverse and significant, many being finished goods not fabricated in the region, including silk, wine, sugar, lace, cotton, hats, horses, clothes, tobacco, cutlery and tea from abroad.

== Hubs of influence ==
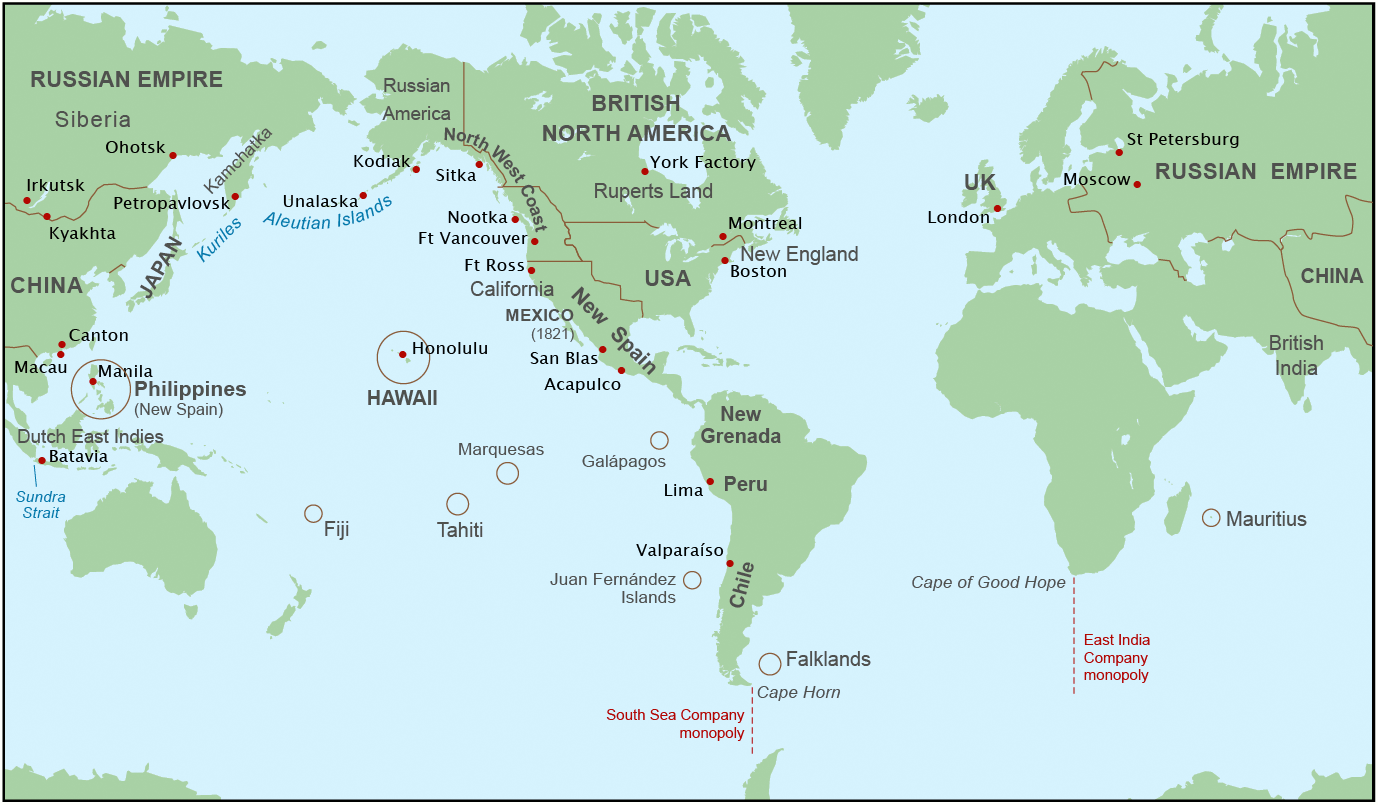
Key hide trading ports

By the mid-1820s, the hide and tallow trade, facilitated by Spanish missions and their clergy and later replaced by private ranches, represented the key profitable industry in California, taxes on their primary products propping up the regional economy and infrastructure. California ports such as San Diego, Santa Cruz, Santa Barbara, San Luis Obispo, San Pedro and Monterey would grow to prominence and success in California as instrumental ports of commerce.

Prepared hides were taken onto Bostonian ships in California which sailed up and down the California shoreline, arriving and trading at these cities perhaps for four months at a time. The crew stored purchased hides at the bayside anchorage of La Playa in San Diego Bay until tens of thousands of hides had been gathered over a period of a few years, now having obtained an expedient and suitable count for the return journey. Some round-trip ventures could take as many as three years for one ship.

Goods from the trade would reach various corners of the globe including Canton in the Far East, Lima in Peru in South America, and Boston in New England. The Hawaiian ports of Honolulu and Oahu existed as significant destinations and ports of call along the way to California, China, and other destinations such as the Russian ports, Petropavlovsk, Fort Ross and Sitka, and the Sandwich Islands as well. Hawaii itself, a British protectorate at the time, existed as a great hub of trade, providing unique goods such as tobacco which could be sold in California and elsewhere, while also becoming a safe haven in the winter for ships engaged in the hide trade. Canton in China provided a tempting market for seal and otter skins, procured mostly earlier in the century on the California coast before the seal and otter populations started to wane, the skins sometimes fetching over twelve times their original value. Fort Vancouver, another British protectorate, provided a key jumping-off point to the California coast as the Hudson's Bay Company came to power in the area. The geographical extent of the trade grew to become a global enterprise.

== International political ramifications and multicultural interactions ==
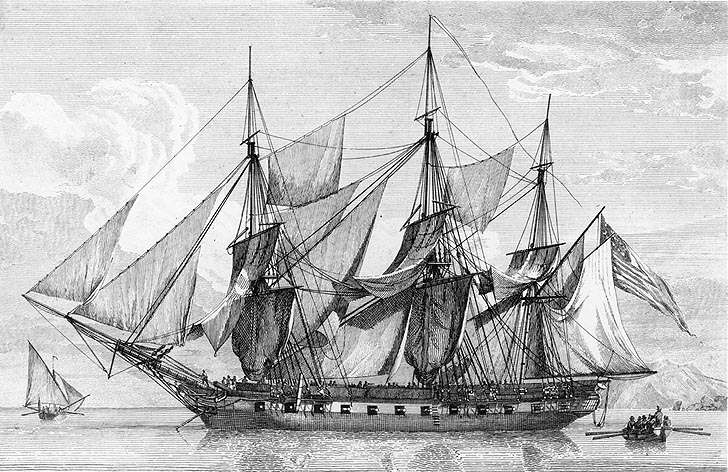
The USS Boston, a vessel similar to those trading in California ports

The Hide Trade proved to gain momentum and come to its ultimate fruition as a result of Mexican Independence in 1821, when individual ranches replaced missions during Mexico’s “secularization” era in the 1820s and 1830s. The number of large ranches increased exponentially by 1840, with cattle numbering over one million in the region.

Though many nations including Russia and the United Kingdom came and traded along the California coastline at major ports, contributing to this economic growth, the United States became the most influential. American trade initially began with sailors from New England, who found an interest in the California otter and seal skins industry which diminished in prominence rapidly after the beginning of the nineteenth century. As hides and tallow replaced seals and otters as the primary products of commerce, corporations such as John Begg and Company of the United Kingdom and Bryant and Sturgis, William Appleton and Company, and Marshall and Wildes of Boston began to demonstrate a vested interest in the hide trade. The John Begg and Company representatives Hugh McCulloch and William Hartnell were able to ensure British influence in the trade for three years beginning in 1822, the de facto first year of the enterprise.

Competition between the two powers escalated over dominance in the trade, with the United States eventually gaining the upper hand. The flourishing company of Bryant and Sturgis itself grew to become the most influential private business venture, facilitated by its associate William Gale, taking in four fifths of all hides from California. The influence of Bryant and Sturgis proved so pervasive that locals equated the company’s city of headquarters, Boston, with the entire United States. Thus, American influence in the region can be traced back as far as the 1820s.

California, during the tenure of the successful hide trade, represented a significant crossroads of various cultures, a frontier shaped by diverse peoples from around the world. Native Americans including the Tlingit, Chinook, Kodiak, Haida, Aleut and Tsimshian groups as well as others often interacted with white traders, at times giving way to positive and negative experiences. Often seeking areas where their trade was less prominent, otter-hunting Tlingit Native Americans would board the ships of foreign captains to travel from Alaska elsewhere. Undoubtedly, Tlingits benefited from commercial trade as well, obtaining objects like copper, porcelain, buttons, and dishes that they may not have come upon otherwise. Often, American or British traders and sailors from the east would stay in California, becoming some of the first Americans to settle in the region, living and intermarrying with Spanish families as a result of Mexico’s relaxed and welcoming laws regarding resident aliens. Eventually, by the 1840s, the originally booming hide and tallow trade began to diminish in significance, the cause proving to be the overabundance of hides now in the eastern markets of Boston created by the trade itself.

Stories and accounts of the region such as Richard Henry Dana Jr.’s Two Years Before the Mast and Alfred Robinson’s Life in California, seen through the eyes of sailors and voyagers, gave rise to a great fascination and recognition of the California region. Setting an important historical antecedent, the California hide trade contributed to a dream of Western promise and success in the minds of Americans back East which helped inspire droves of immigrants during the Gold Rush, according to the historian John Caughey, who states, “The hide and tallow trade had made California an outpost of New England”. Ultimately, the California hide trade set an important precedent which would impact the way the people looked at the West for decades to come. For those interested in further information, The Peabody Essex Museum located in Salem, Massachusetts provides one of many, unique places where one can learn firsthand about the California hide trade.

== See also ==
- Maritime Fur Trade
- California Fur Rush
- Californios
- List of Ranchos of California
- History of California through 1899
