= Pilgrim (brig) =

19th century American sailing brig

History

United States
- Name: Pilgrim
- Owner: Blake, Stanton & Hallett, Boston; later, Bryant & Sturgis, Boston
- Builder: Sprague & James, Medford, Massachusetts
- Launched: 1825
- Fate: Sank in a fire at sea, 1856.

General characteristics
- Class & type: Brig
- Tons burthen: 180.5 tons burthen
- Length: 86.5 ft (26.4 m)
- Beam: 21.6 ft (6.6 m)
- Notes: 1834 voyage described in Two Years Before the Mast by Richard Henry Dana Jr.

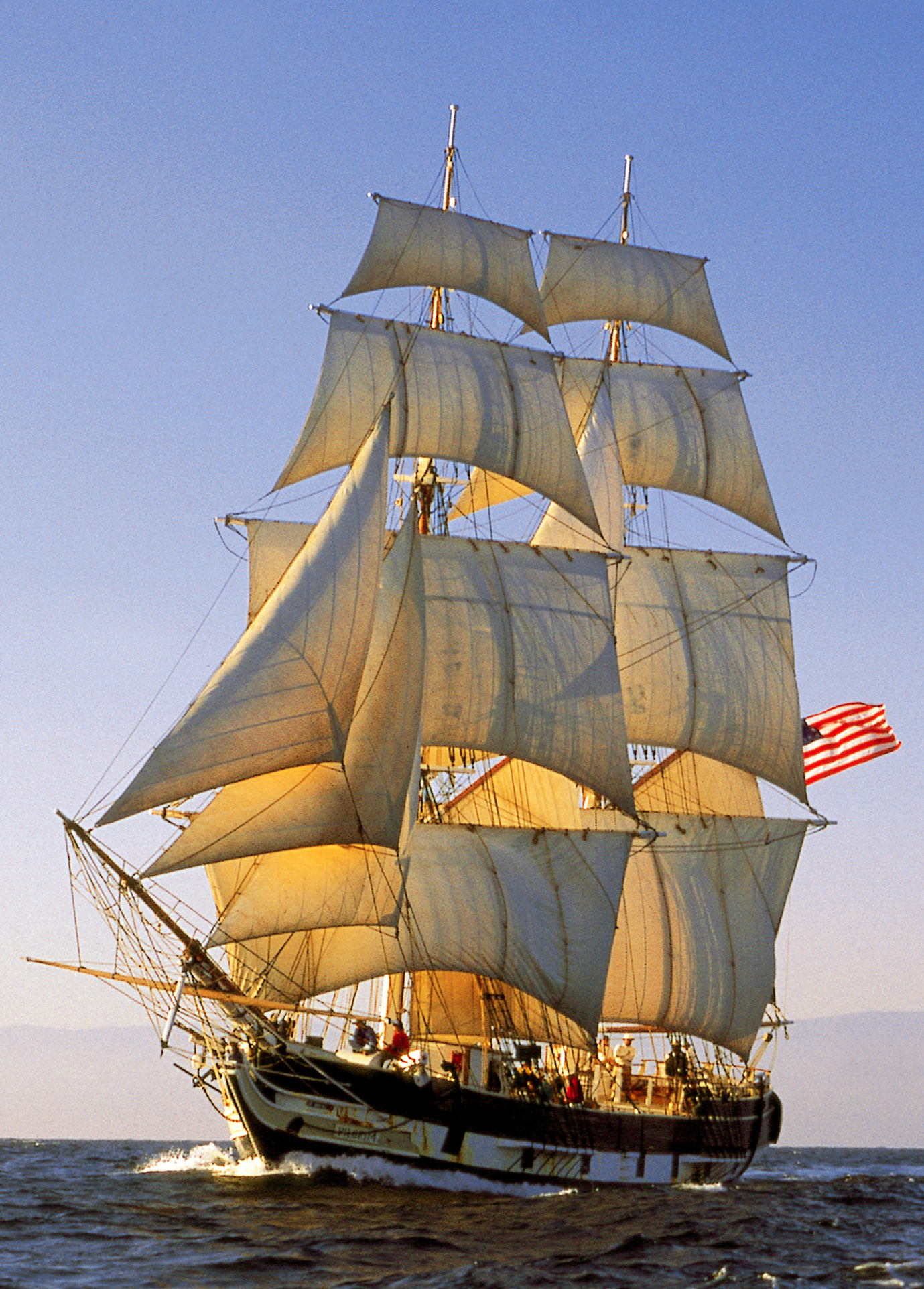
Brig Pilgrim off Santa Barbara in 1996

Pilgrim was an early 19th century American sailing brig. She was immortalized by one of her sailors Richard Henry Dana Jr., who wrote the classic account Two Years Before the Mast about a 1834–1835 voyage between Massachusetts and California to trade for hides. Pilgrim caught fire and sank at sea in 1856.

== Construction and trading ==
Pilgrim was a brig-rigged sailing vessel built in 1825 by Sprague & James at Medford, Massachusetts for Joshua Blake, Francis Stanton and George Hallett, and later sold to Bryant & Sturgis of Boston. She measured 180.5 tons burthen, had a length of 86.5 feet (26.4 m) and a beam of 21.6 feet (6.6 m).

Richard Henry Dana Jr., a Harvard College undergraduate, joined the crew in 1834 as an ordinary sailor for a voyage from Boston, Massachusetts via Cape Horn to California to trade for hides from the ranches around the Franciscan missions. That voyage is covered in the first part of his classic memoire Two Years Before the Mast.

Pilgrim sank off the North Carolina coast after a fire at sea in 1856.

=== Crew ===
As described by Dana, in addition to six to eight common sailors, the ship's complement included three officers: the Captain, the First Mate and the Second Mate. The second mate commanded the starboard watch but while an officer was socially isolated, being neither truly an officer or a crewman. This was probably due to the size of the ship; on larger vessels with more crew, the Second Mate was clearly an officer, but on the Pilgrim, the Captain and First Mate ate together and the Second Mate had to make do with their leftovers. Besides the captain, there were four specialist crewmembers who were not part of any watch: the steward, cook, carpenter and sailmaker.

== Replica ==
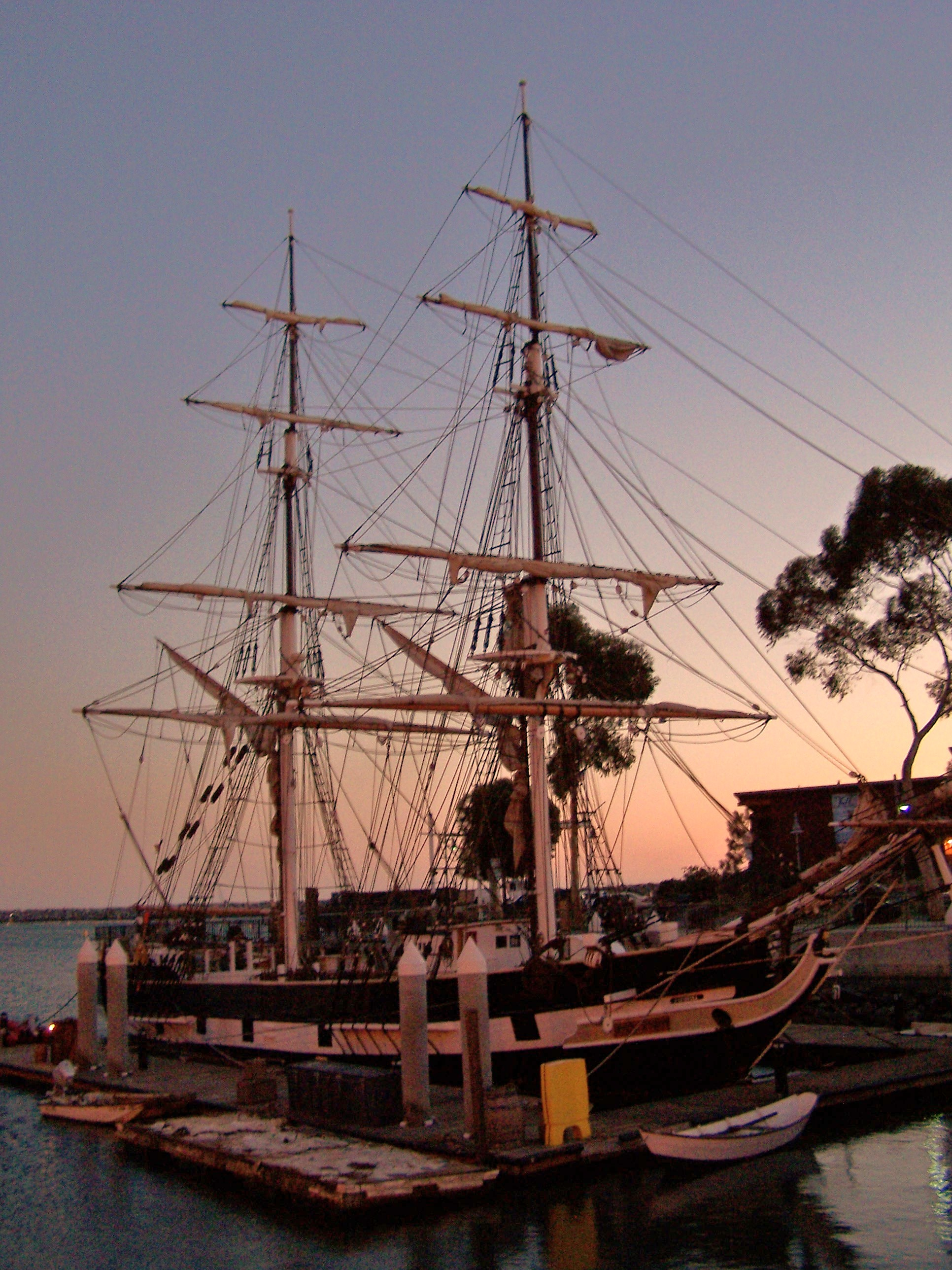
- Brig Pilgrim

History

Denmark
- Launched: 1945

United States
- Name: Pilgrim
- Owner: Ocean Institute
- Port of registry: Dana Point, California 33°27′43″N 117°42′23″W
- Fate: Sank at port on March 29, 2020

General characteristics
- Class & type: 3-masted schooner, converted to brig in 1975
- Notes: Used in 1997 film Amistad

A replica of the vessel was based in Dana Point, California, the site of some of Dana's adventures. This replica began as a 3-masted schooner (also called a "tern" schooner in North America) built in 1945 for the Baltic trade in Denmark. In 1975, Pilgrim was converted to a brig in Setúbal, Portugal. She was used as a floating classroom with the Ocean Institute in Dana Point, California, and she set sail every summer on a tour of Southern California with a volunteer crew. The ship was used in Amistad, a film directed by Steven Spielberg. Pilgrim also played the notorious "Ghost Galleon" in Power Rangers: Turbo.

On March 29, 2020, the Orange County Register reported that the ship had sunk. The ship began to heel starboard in its dock on March 29, and the decision was made to demolish it.

== See also ==
- Ship replica (including a list of ship replicas)
- Two Years Before the Mast
