= Ocean Institute =

Ocean education organization

Coordinates: 33.4611°N 117.7066°W

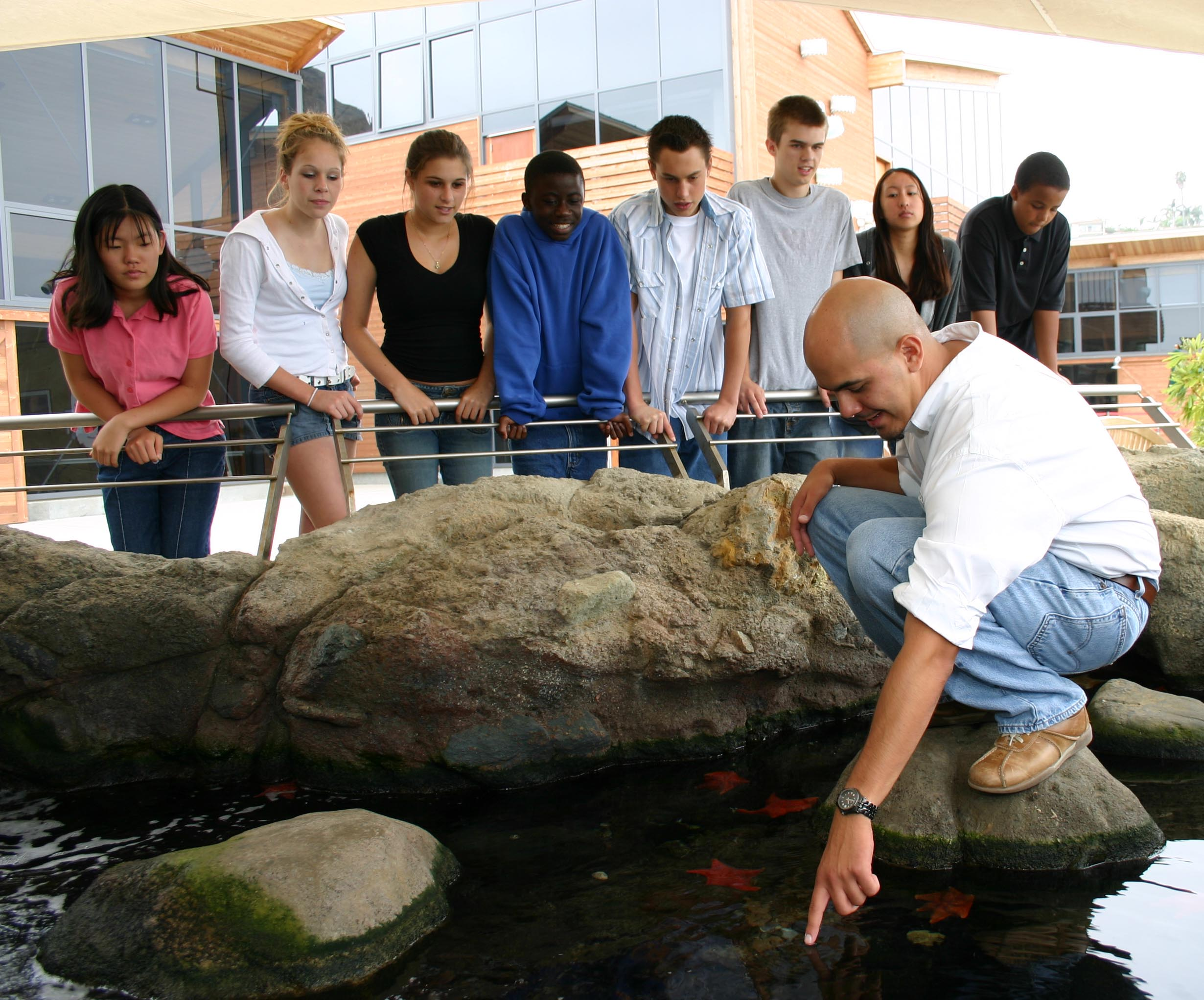
The Ocean Institute welcomes over 100,000 school children annually for ocean science and maritime history programs.

The Ocean Institute is an ocean education organization located in Dana Point, California. Founded as the Orange County Marine Institute in 1977, it offers ocean science and maritime history programs for K–12 students and their teachers. Over 100,000 students and 8,000 teachers from Orange County and the surrounding counties participate yearly in immersion-style programs in the institute's oceanfront labs and abroad.

The institute is open to the general public on weekdays, 10 a.m. – 4 p.m., and weekends, 10 a.m. – 3 p.m.; visitors can see marine animals and ocean-themed exhibits. While creating the Nickelodeon animated television show SpongeBob SquarePants, biologist and cartoonist Stephen Hillenburg drew inspiration from his time teaching at the Ocean Institute.

Moored at the institute is its 70-foot marine science research vessel, the R/V Sea Explorer, used for student programs and to take visitors on trips to see marine wildlife, including whale watching on weekends. The institute also partners with the Lazy-W Ranch, a camp located in the Cleveland National Forest where students study the ecosystem and California history. It provides outreach programs via a mobile laboratory provided by the "Ocean in Motion" van and distance learning via video conference.

== Other facilities ==
- Ecology Learning Center – for grades K–3, includes marine life tanks, wet-tables with video-microscopes, a digital imaging lab and an interactive children's theater.
- Marine Life Refuge – Eight acres of beach and tidepools just to the north of the facility; used for walking tours.
- Maritime Center – Used for teaching maritime history.
- Packard At-Sea Learning Center –For grades 4–6, houses marine life including jellyfish at various stages of development.
- Surfscience Learning Center, Sleeping Deck – Houses teaching exhibits such as an oceanography test tank, wave tank, shark & ray pool, and a shipboard research station. Students on overnight programs can sleep upstairs on the sleeping deck. The deck also houses a National Weather Service Coastal Observation Station.
- Samueli Lecture Hall and Conference Center – The central meeting facility of the institute, used for educational presentations and special events.
- Student and Teacher Services Building – The main administration building; a two-story open lobby serves as the main entry for visitors. Exhibits on the first floor.
- Center for Cooperation in Research and Education – Integrates ocean research into Ocean Institute programs
- Maddie James Seaside Learning Center - A learning center with a biological diversity lab that serves as a transition zone for new animals and a citizen science lab for the study of invasive species.
- Laurena G. Chambers Gallery and Gift Store – Offers educational materials and ocean and maritime-themed gift items.

== Tall Ships: Pilgrim and Spirit of Dana Point ==
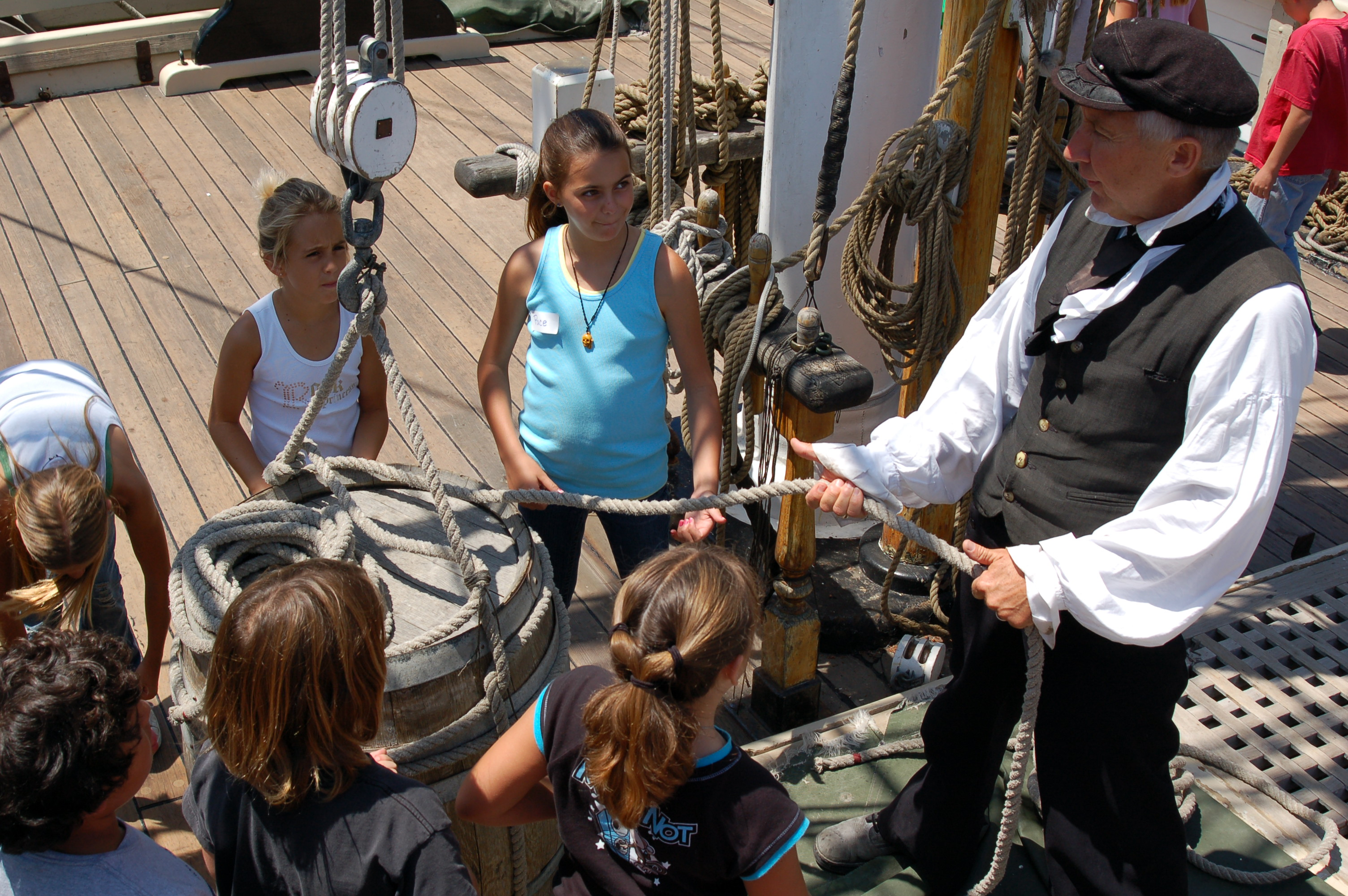
Maritime history program, tall ship Pilgrim, Ocean Institute

The institute maintains two tall ships, the Pilgrim, a 130-foot vessel used in overnight and dockside programs, and the Spirit of Dana Point, a 118-foot topsail schooner. The Pilgrim is a replica of the tall ship that Richard Henry Dana Jr. sailed onboard into Dana Point in the 1830s. Tall ship programs simulate the experience of a sailor in the 1830s.

The Pilgrim and Spirit of Dana Point are showcased at the institute's largest annual event, the Toshiba Tall Ships Festival, held in September. It draws seven or eight tall ships from up and down the coast, and features pirates, singing, cannon battles, and a chance to sail on a tall ship.

The replica of the Pilgrim was demolished in April 2020 after sinking.

== Annual budget ==
The Ocean Institute has an annual budget of $6 million, and employs 100 full and part-time staff members, as well as utilizing the services of hundreds of volunteers. Professional partners include the Jet Propulsion Laboratory, the National Science Foundation and Scripps Institution of Oceanography. Supporters include the Swenson Family Foundation, the Henry Samueli Foundation, Quiksilver, and KOCE, among others. Wendy Marshall serves as the institute's president and CEO. It is funded through school visitations, state and city grants, as well as gifts from local philanthropists. The watershed education program is funded by MyOcean and the Surf Industry Manufacturers Association.

The institute's largest annual fundraiser is its Laguna Beach Million Dollar Home Raffle, which began in 2005.
