= Richard Henry Dana Jr. =

American author and lawyer (1815–1882)

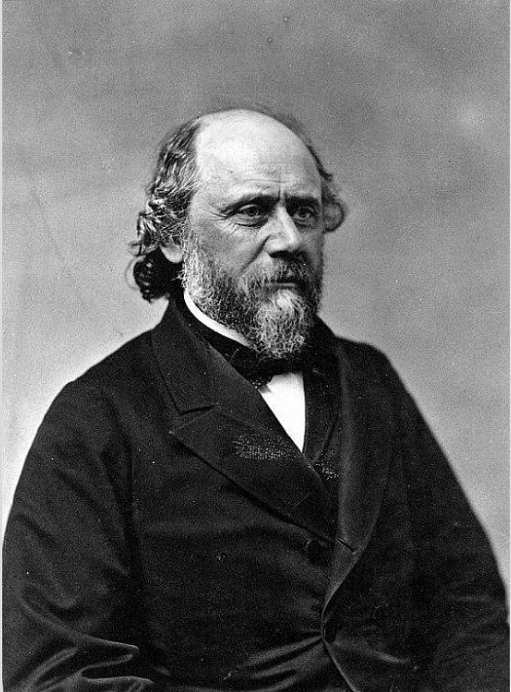
- Dana, c. 1868

United States Attorney for the District of Massachusetts
- In office 1861–1866
- President: Abraham Lincoln
- Preceded by: Charles L. Woodbury
- Succeeded by: George Stillman Hillard

Personal details
- Born: August 1, 1815 Cambridge, Massachusetts, U.S.
- Died: January 6, 1882 (aged 66) Rome, Kingdom of Italy
- Party: Free Soil; Republican
- Other political affiliations: Independent Republican (1868)
- Children: Richard Henry Dana III
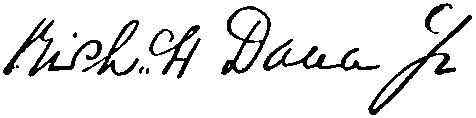
- Signature

Richard Henry Dana Jr. (August 1, 1815 – January 6, 1882) was an American lawyer and politician from Massachusetts, a descendant of a colonial family, who gained renown as the author of the classic American memoir Two Years Before the Mast and as an attorney who successfully represented the U.S. government before the U.S. Supreme Court during the Civil War in the Prize Cases. Both as a writer and as a lawyer, he was a champion of the downtrodden, from seamen to fugitive slaves and freedmen.

== Early life and education ==
Dana was born in Cambridge, Massachusetts, on August 1, 1815 into a family that had settled in colonial America in 1640, counting Anne Bradstreet among its ancestors. His father was the poet and critic Richard Henry Dana Sr. As a boy, Dana studied in Cambridgeport under a strict schoolmaster named Samuel Barrett, alongside fellow Cambridge native and future writer James Russell Lowell. Barrett was infamous as a disciplinarian who punished his students for any infraction by flogging. He also often pulled students by their ears and, on one such occasion, nearly pulled Dana's ear off, causing the boy's father to protest enough that the practice was abolished.

In 1825, Dana enrolled in a private school overseen by Ralph Waldo Emerson, whom Dana later mildly praised as "a very pleasant instructor", though he lacked a "system or discipline enough to ensure regular and vigorous study." In July 1831, Dana enrolled at Harvard College, where in his freshman year his support of a student protest cost him a six-month suspension. In his junior year, he contracted measles, which in his case led to ophthalmia.

This worsening vision inspired him to take a sea voyage. But rather than going on a fashionable Grand Tour of Europe he decided, despite his social standing, to enlist as a merchant seaman.

On August 14, 1834, he departed Boston aboard the brig Pilgrim, captained by Frank Thompson, bound for Alta California, at that time still a part of Mexico. This voyage would bring Dana to a number of settlements in California (including Monterey, San Buenaventura, San Pedro, San Juan Capistrano and the Dana Point headlands, San Diego, Santa Barbara, Santa Clara and San Francisco). After witnessing Thompson's sadistic practices, including a flogging on board the ship, he vowed that he would try to help improve the lot of the common seaman.

The Pilgrim collected cowhides for shipment to Boston, and Dana spent much of his time in California at San Diego's Point Loma and the Dana Point headlands (referred to by Dana as San Juan), curing cowhides and loading them onto the ship.

Dana relates his difficult task of getting the cowhides from the headlands cliff edge to the beach and boats 400 hundred feet below by a process called "hide-droghing," where cowhides were flung with great strength far enough out to avoid them catching on the cliff outcrops below. F. Benedict Coleman's bronze sculpture The Hide Drogher, installed at the same Dana Point headlands cliffs, intentionally illustrates Dana's account with a realistic life-size statue/sculpture.

Dana's description of his time on Point Loma expressed love and concern for the Hawaiians (referred to as "Sandwich Islanders") who worked there alongside him. He may have been predisposed to feel positively toward them by a previous stay in Andover, Massachusetts, among evangelicals who had embraced Hawaiians in New England and sent the first Protestant missionaries to Hawaii.

Wishing to return home sooner, Dana was reassigned by the ship's owners to a different ship: the Alert. Dana gives the classic account of the return trip around Cape Horn in the middle of the Antarctic winter. He describes terrifying storms and profound beauty, giving vivid descriptions of icebergs which he called incomparable. He found the most incredible part of the journey the weeks and weeks it took to negotiate passage against winds and storms—all the while having to race up and down the ice-covered rigging to furl and unfurl sails. The public art sculpture titled The Topmen by Christopher Pecharka was installed at the Dana Point harbor to realistically illustrate this dangerous work.

At one point he had an infected tooth, and his face swelled up so that he was unable to work for several days, despite the need for all hands. He also describes the scurvy that afflicts members of the crew after the rounding of the Horn. In White-Jacket, Herman Melville wrote, "But if you want the best idea of Cape Horn, get my friend Dana's unmatchable Two Years Before the Mast. But you can read, and so you must have read it. His chapters describing Cape Horn must have been written with an icicle."

On September 22, 1836, Dana arrived back in Massachusetts. He then enrolled at what is now Harvard Law School, then called the Dane Law School after Nathan Dane. He graduated in 1837, and was admitted to the bar in 1840.

== Career ==
Dana went on to specialize in maritime law. In the October 1839 issue of a magazine, he took a local judge, one of his own instructors in law school, to task for letting off a ship's captain and mate with a slap on the wrist for murdering the ship's cook, beating him to death for not "laying hold" of a piece of equipment. The judge had sentenced the captain to ninety days in jail and the mate to thirty days.

In 1841, Dana published The Seaman's Friend, which became a standard reference on the legal rights and responsibilities of sailors. He defended many common seamen in court.

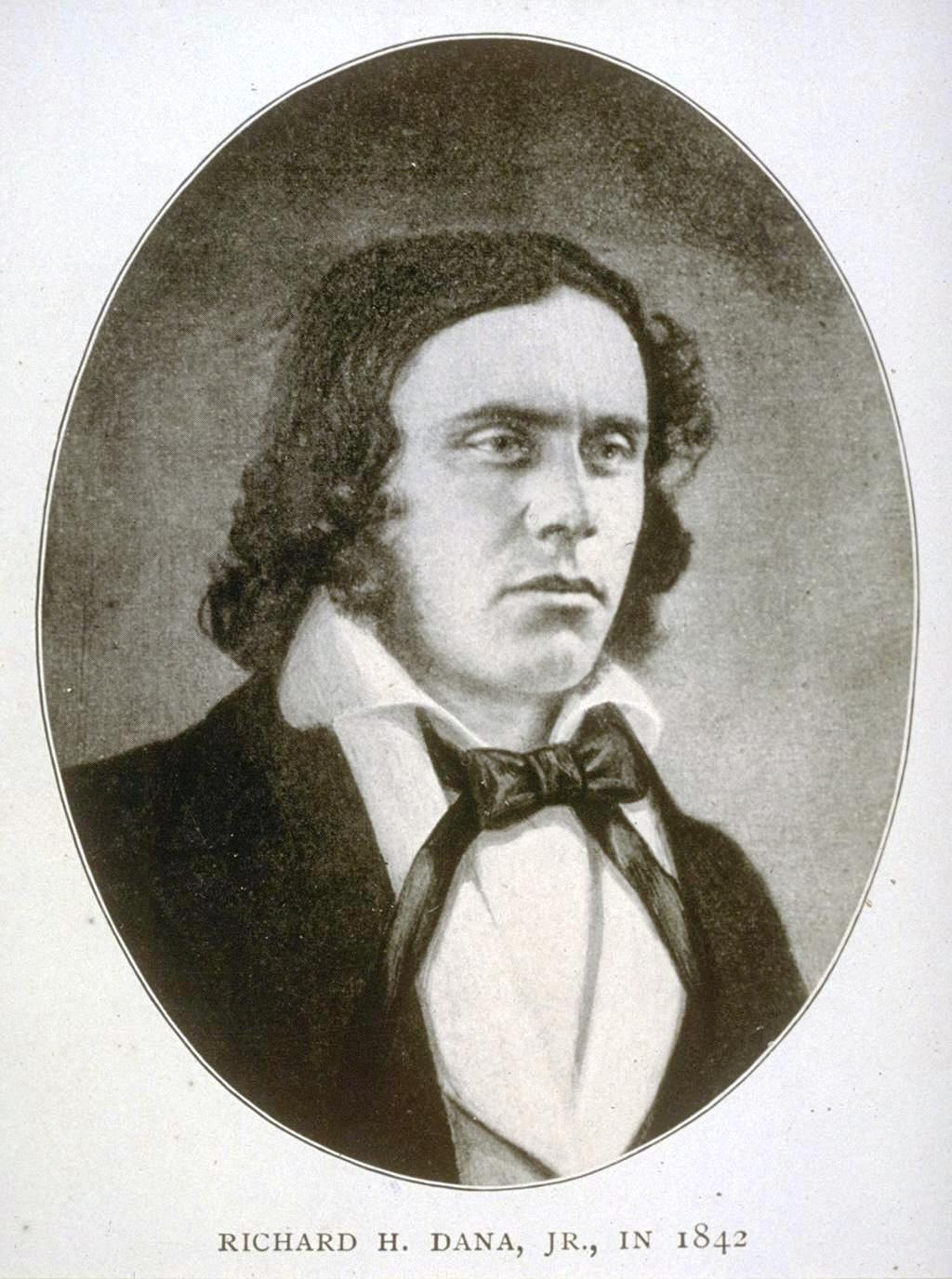
Dana in 1842

During his voyages he had kept a diary, and in 1840 (coinciding with his admission to the bar) he published a memoir, Two Years Before the Mast. The term "before the mast" refers to sailors' quarters, which were located in the forecastle (the ship's bow), officers' quarters being near the stern. His writing evinces his later sympathy for the oppressed. With the California Gold Rush later in the decade, Two Years Before the Mast would become highly sought after as one of the few sources of information on California.

Dana became a prominent abolitionist, helping to found the anti-slavery Free Soil Party in 1848 and representing the fugitive slave Anthony Burns in Boston in 1854. He was a member of the Boston Vigilance Committee, an organization that assisted fugitive slaves.

In 1853, Dana represented William T. G. Morton in Morton's attempt to establish that he discovered the "anaesthetic properties of ether".

In 1859, while the U.S. Senate was considering whether the United States should try to annex the Spanish possession of Cuba, Dana traveled there and visited Havana, a sugar plantation, a bullfight, and various churches, hospitals, schools, and prisons, a trip documented in his book To Cuba and Back.

During the American Civil War, Dana served as a United States Attorney, and, in the Prize Cases, successfully argued before the Supreme Court that the U.S. president had the power under the U.S. Constitution to blockade Confederate ports.

After the end of the Civil War, he resigned his office since he did not approve of President Andrew Johnson's policy of Reconstruction, which was denounced by Radical Republicans as being too moderate in regard to blacks' civil rights and the punishment of former Confederates, and entered private practice. During 1867–1868, Dana was a member of the Massachusetts legislature and also served as a U.S. counsel in the trial of Confederate President Jefferson Davis.

On August 24, 1868, Dana wrote a letter to Attorney General William Evarts arguing that the United States should abandon the prosecution because, even though there was no doubt that Davis had committed treason, a jury in Virginia would be unlikely to convict, which "would be most humiliating to the Government and people of this country." A conviction, even "if obtained, will settle nothing in law or natural practice not now settled, and nothing in fact not now history...."

In 1868, Dana ran as an independent candidate for the U.S. House of Representatives from Essex County, Massachusetts. He lost to incumbent Republican Benjamin Butler and also received fewer votes than Democrat Otis P. Lord.

In 1876, his nomination as minister to Great Britain was defeated in the Senate by political enemies William Beach Lawrence and Benjamin Butler, partly because of a lawsuit for plagiarism brought against him for a legal textbook he had edited, Henry Wheaton's Elements of International Law (8th ed., 1866). Immediately after the book's publication, Dana had been charged by the editor of two earlier editions, William Beach Lawrence, with infringing his copyright, and was involved in litigation that continued for thirteen years. In such minor matters as arrangement of notes and verification of citations the court found against Dana, but in the main Dana's notes were vastly different from Lawrence's.

In 1877, Dana was one of the counsel for the U.S. federal government, appearing before the Halifax Fisheries Commission, appointed under the Treaty of Washington (1871) to resolve outstanding issues, including fishing rights. The Commission gave an award directing the U.S. to pay $5,500,000 to the British government. Towards the end of his life he went to Europe to devote himself to the preparation of a treatise on international law, but the actual composition of this work was little more than begun when he died in Rome, January 6, 1882.

Additional biographical information and insights into the life of Richard Henry Dana Jr. are in the "Introductory Note" to the Harvard Classics edition of Two Years Before the Mast, edited by Charles W. Eliot, L.L.D., and published by P.F. Collier & Son in 1909. Here is an excerpt:

Richard Henry Dana, the second of that name, was born in Cambridge, Massachusetts, August 1, 1815. He came of a stock that had resided there since the days of the early settlements; his grandfather, Francis Dana, had been the first American minister to Russia and later became chief justice of the Supreme Court of Massachusetts; his father was distinguished as a man of letters. He entered Harvard College in 1831; but near the beginning of his third year an attack of measles left his eyesight so weak that study was impossible. Tired of the tedium of a slow convalescence, he decided on a sea voyage; and choosing to go as a sailor rather than a passenger, he shipped from Boston on August 14, 1834, on the brig Pilgrim, bound for the coast of California. His experiences for the next two years form the subject of the present volume.

In the December following his return to Boston in 1836, Dana re-entered Harvard, the hero of his fellow students, graduating the following June. He next took up the study of law, at the same time teaching elocution in the College, and in 1840 he opened an office in Boston. While in law school he had written the narrative of his voyage, which he now published; and in the following year, 1841, issued The Seaman's Friend. Both books were republished in England and brought him an immediate reputation.

After several years of practicing law, during which he dealt largely with cases involving the rights of seamen, he began to take part in politics as an active member of the Free Soil Party. The Free Soil Party was founded in 1847–48 in opposition to the extension of slavery into the western U.S. territories newly acquired from Mexico.

During the operation of the Fugitive Slave Act he served as counsel on behalf of the fugitives Shadrach Minkins, Thomas Sims, and Anthony Burns, and on one occasion suffered a serious assault as a consequence of his zeal. His prominence in these cases, along with his fame as a writer, brought him much social recognition on his visit to England in 1856. Three years later, his health gave way from overwork, and he set out on a voyage round the world, revisiting California, where he made the observations that appear in the postscript to this book. The postscript is titled, "Twenty-Four Years After."

On his return, Dana was appointed by President Abraham Lincoln as United States Attorney for Massachusetts. In his argument before the U.S. Supreme Court in the Prize Cases, which upheld Lincoln's blockade of Southern ports, he greatly increased an already brilliant legal reputation. He spoke out in favor of African-American voting, education, property, and firearms ownership, stating:

We have got to choose between two results. With these four millions of Negroes, either you must have four millions of disfranchised, disarmed, untaught, landless, thriftless, non-producing, non-consuming, degraded men, or else you must have four millions of land-holding, industrious, arms-bearing, and voting population. Choose between the two! Which will you have?

His sentiments were echoed by future U.S. President James A. Garfield in his speeches, who agreed with Dana's message.

=== Personal life ===
On August 25, 1841, Dana married Sarah Watson of Wethersfield, Connecticut. The oldest of their six children, Richard Henry Dana III, married Edith Longfellow, daughter of Henry Wadsworth Longfellow.

=== Namesakes and Honors ===
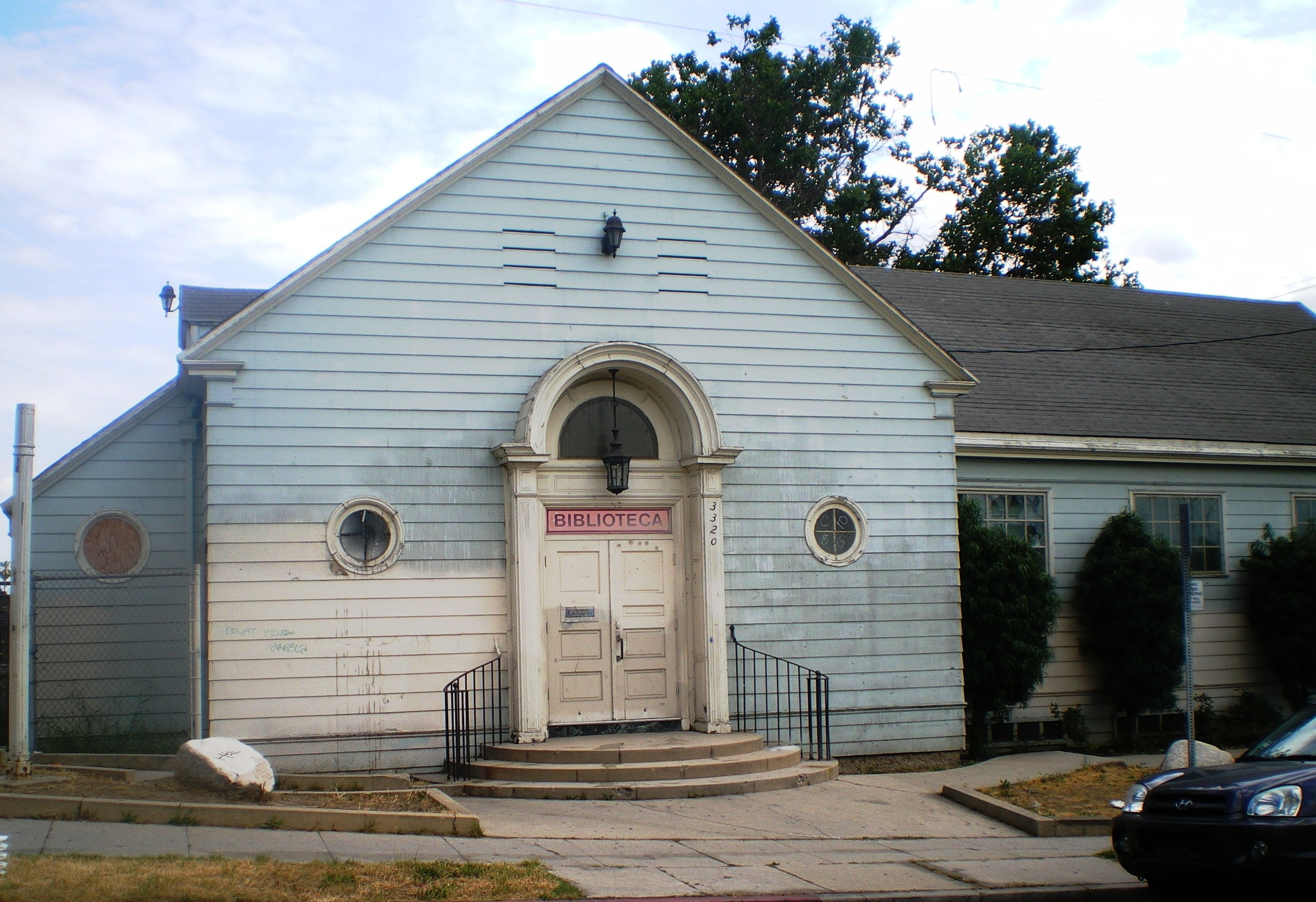
Richard Henry Dana Branch, closed and vacant, May 2008

- The point and city of Dana Point, California, located on the Pacific coast about halfway between Los Angeles and San Diego, are named for him, and a reproduction of the brig Pilgrim, on which Dana sailed around Cape Horn, was on display there by the Ocean Institute until its sinking in 2020.
- A larger-than-life 9-foot cast bronze statue of Richard Henry Dana, Jr. by John R. Terken was installed at the Dana Point Harbor in 1972.
- Several schools are named in his honor:
  - Richard Henry Dana Elementary School in Dana Point, California
  - Richard Henry Dana Middle School in Arcadia, California
  - Dana Middle School in the Point Loma neighborhood of San Diego, California
  - Richard Henry Dana Middle School in Hawthorne, California
  - Dana Middle School in San Pedro, California
- A roadway in Coronado, California is named in his Honor. R.H. Dana Place looks across the entry to San Diego Bay towards where Richard Henry Dana, a young man of only 20 years, first set foot at San Diego, California in 1834. There he worked and lived in a large curing house processing hides which would be shipped to Boston and made into leather goods. It was this same view that inspired the Coronado City Council, in January 1931, to rename what was then Ada Place, as R.H. Dana Place, honoring Dana, and recognizing his accomplishments, and connection to San Diego and Coronado.
- The R.H. Dana Patio sits along R.H. Dana Place in Coronado, California. This garden patio at Coronado Plaza was developed by the Dan McGeorge Gallery.
- Dana Place, a street in Washington, D.C.
- The Richard Henry Dana Branch Library in Los Angeles
- The Dana Neighborhood Library in Long Beach, California

== Bibliography ==
=== Selected works by Dana ===
- 1840. Two Years Before the Mast. Revised 1869 by the author; revised 1911 by his son.
- 1841. The Seaman's Friend: Containing a Treatise on Practical Seamanship, with Plates; A Dictionary of Sea Terms; Customs and Usages of the Merchant Service; Laws Relating to the Practical Duties of Master and Mariners. 1st edition; 6th edition, 1851
- Dana, Richard Henry (December 31, 1847). The Seaman's Friend: Containing a treatise on practical seamanship, with plates, a dictionary of sea terms, customs and usages of the merchant service (PDF) (1st ed.). T. Groom.
- 1839. Cruelty to Seamen: Being the Case of Nichols & Couch. American Jurist and Law Magazine, October 1839, 22:92–107. This magazine was published in two volumes per year. Dana's article was republished in 1937 under the same title at Berkeley, California: The hand press of Wilder and Ellen Bentley.
- c. 1842. An Autobiographical Sketch.
- 1859. To Cuba and Back.
- 1869. Twenty-Four Years After. Now included in subsequent editions of Two Years Before the Mast
- 1871. "How We Met John Brown". Atlantic Monthly. 28 (165): 1–9 . July 1871. A 2005 article in Lake Placid News, without giving any evidence, reference, or explanation, has called "How We Met John Brown" "an outright fabrication".
- 1968. The Journal. Robert F. Lucid, editor. Cambridge: Belknap Press of Harvard University Press. Six volumes of diaries from 1841–1860.
- 2005. Journal of a Voyage Round the World, 1859-1860. The final section of Dana's journal (above), reprinted in the Library of America volume on Dana (Two Years Before the Mast & Other Voyages. Edited by Thomas Philbrick. New York: Library of America); it "records the 14-month circumnavigation that took Dana to California, Hawaii, China, Japan, Malaya, Ceylon, India, Egypt, and Europe. Written with unflagging energy and curiosity, the journal provides fascinating vignettes of frontier life in California, missionary influence in Hawaii, the impact of the Taiping Rebellion and the Second Opium War on China, and the opening of Japan to the West, while capturing the transition from the age of sail to the faster, smaller world created by the steamship and the telegraph."

== See also ==
- 1868 Massachusetts legislature
- George Livermore

== Notes ==
Legal offices
Preceded by Charles L. Woodbury	United States Attorney for the District of Massachusetts; 1861–1866	Succeeded by George Stillman Hillard
