= Dana (surname) =

Dana (/ˈdeɪnə/ or /ˈdænə/) as a surname may have several origins.

At least into the first half of the 19th century, many American Danas were of Dana family, who arrived in Cambridge, Massachusetts around 1640. Notable people with the surname Dana include:

- Amasa Dana (1792–1867), American congressman (D-NY)
- Andrew Dana, American restaurateur
- Audrey Dana, French actress
- Bill Dana, (1924–2017) American comedian, actor, and screenwriter
- Caden Dana (born 2003), American baseball player
- Charles Dana (disambiguation)
- Daniel Dana (1771–1859), American educator, president of Dartmouth College
- Deane Dana (1926–2005), American politician
- Doris Dana (1920–2006), American writer and translator
- E. Elizabeth Dana, proprietress of Miss Dana's School for Young Ladies
- Edmund Trowbridge Dana (1818–1869), United States jurist
- Edward Salisbury Dana, American mineralogist and physicist
- Fra M. Dana (1874–1948), American artist
- Francis Dana, American lawyer
- Felipe Dana, Brazilian Photographer
- George Augustus Dana (1840–1911), Canadian politician and playwright
- Henry Dana (1820–1852), founder of the Native Police force in Victoria, Australia
- Henry Wadsworth Longfellow Dana (1881–1950), American academic and activist
- Jack Dana (1921–1983), American basketball player
- James Dana (disambiguation)
- James Dwight Dana (1813–1895), scientist, zoological author abbreviation Dana.
- John Dana (disambiguation)
- Joseph Dana (1742–1827), United States clergyman
- Judah Dana (1772–1845), Maine statesman and United States Senator
- Leora Dana (1923–1983), American actress
- Lowell Dana (1891–1937), American football coach
- Mazen Dana, Palestinian Reuters cameraman who was shot dead by US soldiers
- Muriel Frances Dana (1916–1997), American child actress
- Napoleon J.T. Dana (1822–1905), a career U.S. Army officer
- Noah Dana-Picard, Israeli mathematician and Talmudic scholar
- Olive E. Dana (1859-?), American writer
- Paul Dana (1975–2006), American race car driver
- Paul Dana (journalist) (1852–1930), American journalist
- Philippe Dana (born 1959), French journalist
- Reza Dana, American doctor
- Richard Dana (disambiguation)
- Richard Henry Dana Jr. (1815-1882), American lawyer and politician
- Robert Dana (1929–2010), American poet
- Sam Dana (1903–2007), American football player
- Samuel Dana (Massachusetts politician) (1767–1835), Massachusetts politician, lawyer and judge
- Samuel Dana (clergyman) (1739–1798), Massachusetts clergyman and politician
- Samuel Luther Dana (1795–1868), a Massachusetts textile and agriculture chemist
- Samuel W. Dana, American lawyer and politician
- Simphiwe Dana, South African Xhosa singer-songwriter
- Stephen Winchester Dana (born 1840), United States clergyman
- Sophia Dana, nineteenth-century feminist, a Transcendentalist and later a Catholic
- Susan Lawrence Dana, American feminist, suffragist, and member of National Women's Party
- Vic Dana (born 1940), American dancer and singer
- Viola Dana (also known as Viola Flugrath, born Virginia Flugrath), silent movie actress
- Walter Dana, Polish-American musician
- William Dana (disambiguation)

== See also ==
- Dano
- Dana family, a Boston Brahmin family
