= Dana family =

The Dana family is a Boston Brahmin family that arrived in Cambridge, Massachusetts from England during the later end of the Puritan migration to New England (1620–1640).

== Richard Dana, immigrant ==
The patriarch, Richard Dana (c.1620–1690) was said to have been born in England. There was a Richard Dana born in Manchester, England in 1617 who is the right age and disappears from English records before Richard Dana arrives in Cambridge. Richard Dana had settled in Cambridge, Massachusetts by 1640.

In Cambridge, he served numerous posts in the local government, including selectman, constable, tythingman, and grand juror. He married Ann Bullard about 1648. The couple had fourteen children, all born in Cambridge:

- John (1649–1650)
- Hannah (1651–1728), baptized as Anne, married Samuel Oldham
- Samuel (1653–1653)
- Jacob (1654–1698), married Patience Sabin
- Joseph (1656–1700), married Mary Gobell. Abiah's twin brother.
- Abiah (1656–1668), Joseph's twin brother.
- Benjamin (1660–1738), married Mary Buckminster.
- Elizabeth (1662–1702), married Daniel Woodward. Unlike her siblings, she moved to Connecticut.
- Daniel (1663–1749), married Naomi Croswell. Most of the famous Danas of Massachusetts come from Daniel Dana.
- Deliverance (1667–1741), married Samuel Hyde.
- Sarah (1669–1669)

== Notable Danas descended from Richard Dana ==
- Amasa Dana (1792–1867), US representative
- Charles A. Dana (philanthropist) (1881–1975): businessman, politician, philanthropist, founder of the Dana Foundation and Dana Holding Corporation
- Charles Anderson Dana (1819–1897): journalist, author, assistant Secretary of War (1864–1866)
- Charles Loomis Dana (1852–1935): neurologist at Cornell Medical College
- Charles R. Dana (1802–1868): Mormon leader and politician
- Charles S. Dana (1862–1939): Speaker of the Vermont House of Representatives
- Daniel Dana (1771–1859): president of Dartmouth College
- Edmund Trowbridge Dana (1818–1869): jurist
- Edward Salisbury Dana (1849–1935): mineralogist, physicist
- Francis Dana (1743–1811): member of the Continental Congress, signer of the Articles of Confederation
- Henry Wadsworth Longfellow Dana (1881–1950): academic, activist, and pacifist
- James Dana (clergyman) (1735–1812): pastor of the First Church in New Haven
- James Dana (mayor) (1811–1890): mayor of Charlestown, Massachusetts
- James Dwight Dana (1813–1895): geologist, mineralogist, zoologist, volcanologist
- John Cotton Dana (1856–1929): librarian and museum director
- John W. Dana (1808–1867): governor of Maine
- Joseph Dana (1742–1827): clergyman
- Judah Dana (1772–1845): US senator
- Lowell Dana (1891–1937): college football coach
- Napoleon J.T. Dana (1822–1905): American general during the Civil War and the Mexican–American War
- Olive E. Dana (1859–?): author
- Paul Dana (journalist) (1852–1930): journalist
- Richard Dana (lawyer) (1699–1772): colonial Boston politician, a founder of the Sons of Liberty
- Richard Henry Dana Sr. (1787–1879): lawyer, poet, critic
- Richard Henry Dana Jr. (1815–1882): lawyer, politician, author (Two Years Before the Mast)
- Richard Henry Dana III (1851–1931): lawyer, civil service reformer, husband of Henry Wadsworth Longfellow's daughter
- Samuel Dana (1767–1835): US representative
- Samuel Dana (clergyman) (1739–1798): clergyman, judge, politician
- Samuel Luther Dana (1795–1868): chemist
- Samuel W. Dana (1760–1830): US senator and representative
- William Parsons Winchester Dana (1833–1927): international impressionist painter

Other notable descendants:

- Charles Dana Gibson (1867–1944): graphic artist, created the "Gibson Girl"
- Samuel Dana Bell (1798–1868): politician and judge
- Samuel Newell Bell (1829–1889): US representative
- William Dana Ewart (1851–1908): inventor of the Link Belt and founder of the Link-Belt Construction Equipment Company
- Samuel Dana Greene (1839–1884) US Naval officer

== See also ==
- Boston Brahmin
- Dana
