= Asahel (given name) =

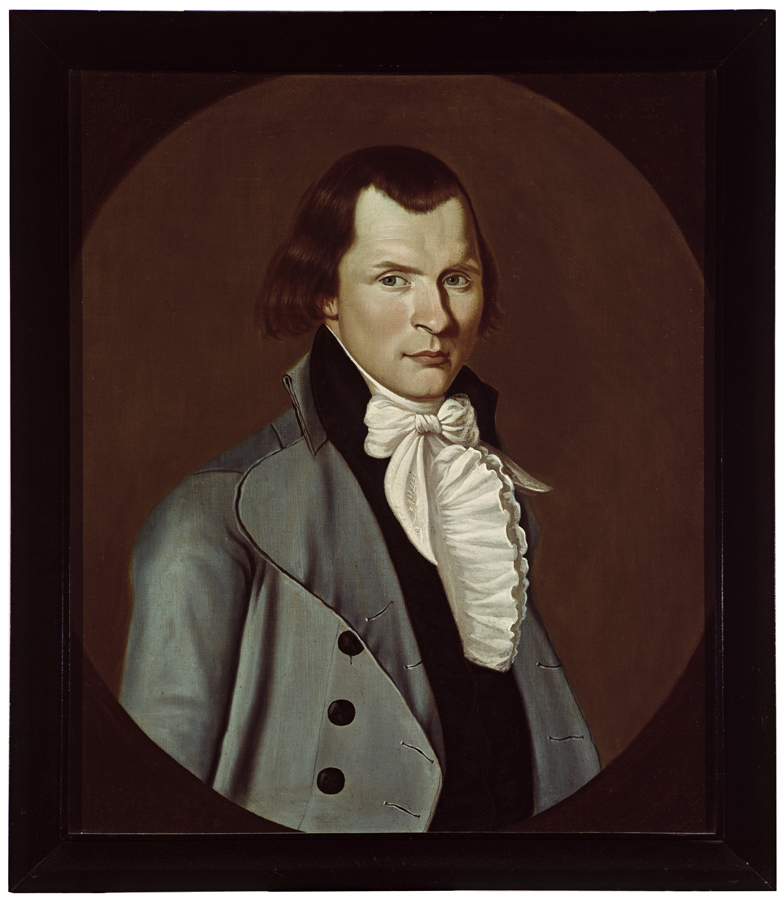
Asahel Bacon and Portrait of Asahel Bacon

Asahel is a given name. Notable people with the given name include:

- Asahel, biblical figure
- Asahel C. Beckwith (1827–1896), American politician
- Asahel Bush (1824–1913), American newspaper publisher and businessman
- Asahel Curtis (1874–1941), American photographer
- Asahel Farr (1820–1887), American politician
- Asahel Finch Jr. (1809–1883), American politician and lawyer
- Asahel Grant (1807–1844), American missionary
- Asahel Gridley (1810–1881), American politician, lawyer, merchant and banker
- Asahel Henderson (1815–?), American politician
- Asahel W. Hubbard (1819–1879), American judge and politician
- Asahel Huntington (1798–1870), American politician
- Asahel C. Kendrick (1809–1895), American classicist, grammarian and exegete
- Asahel Lathrop (1810–1893), American Mormon pioneer
- Asahel Hooker Lewis (1810–1862), American newspaper editor and politician
- Asahel Nettleton (1783–1844), American theologian and evangelist
- A. H. Patch (1825–1909), American inventor and manufacturer
- Asahel Perry (1784–1869), American politician and community leader
- Asahel Lynde Powers (1813–1843), American painter
- Asahel Stearns (1774–1839), American politician
- Asahel Thomson (1790–1866), American physician and politician

== See also ==
- Asael (name)
