= Samuel Dana =

Samuel Dana may refer to:

- Samuel Dana (Massachusetts politician) (1767–1835), American lawyer and politician in Massachusetts
- Samuel Dana (clergyman) (1739–1798), his father, American clergyman, judge and politician
- Samuel W. Dana (1760–1830), American lawyer and politician from Connecticut
- Samuel Luther Dana (1795–1868), American chemist
