= Senator Dana =

Senator Dana may refer to:

== Members of the United States Senate ==
- Judah Dana (1772–1845), U.S. Senator from Maine from 1836 to 1837
- Samuel W. Dana (1760–1830), U.S. Senator from Connecticut from 1810 to 1821

== United States state senate members ==
- John W. Dana (1808–1867), Maine State Senate
- Samuel Dana (clergyman) (1739–1798), New Hampshire State Senate
- Samuel Dana (Massachusetts politician) (1767–1835), Massachusetts State Senate
