= Charles Dana =

Charles Dana may refer to:

- Charles A. Dana (philanthropist) (1881–1975) of the Dana Foundation, and New York State legislator and industrialist
- Charles Anderson Dana (1819–1897), U.S. journalist, author, government official
- Charles Loomis Dana (1852–1935), neurologist
- Charles R. Dana (1802–1868), Latter-day Saint leader and politician
- Charles S. Dana (1862–1939), Speaker of the Vermont House of Representatives
- Charles W. Dana, 19th-century California State Assembly member

== See also ==
- Charles Dana Gibson (1867–1944), American artist
- Charles Dana Wilber (1830–1891), American land speculator and journalist
- Dana (disambiguation)
