= Jonathan Remington =

Massachusetts colonial judge (1677–1745)

Associate Justice of Massachusetts Superior Court of Judicature
- In office 1733–1745
- Appointed by: Jonathan Belcher
- Preceded by: John Cushing
- Succeeded by: Richard Saltonstall

Personal details
- Born: July 27, 1677 Cambridge, Massachusetts, Massachusetts Bay, America
- Died: September 20, 1745 (aged 68) Cambridge, Massachusetts, U.S.
- Spouse: Lucy Bradstreet Remington
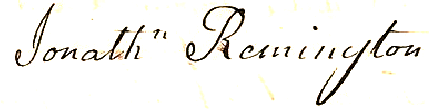
- Signature

Jonathan Remington (1677–1745), was an Associate Justice of Massachusetts Superior Court of Judicature appointed by Gov. Jonathan Belcher. Judge Remington married Lucy Remington Bradstreet (1680–1743), a granddaughter of Gov. Simon Bradstreet. Their daughter Ann Remington (her first name is also spelled "Anne") was the first wife of William Ellery, a signer of the United States Declaration of Independence.

== Life ==
Born July 27, 1677, to Capt. Jonathan Remington (d. 1700) and Martha Belcher Remington (d. 1711);

A Harvard graduate (A.B. 1696);

Resident tutor and fellow in Harvard, 1703–11;

Deputy to the General Court, Cambridge;

Governor's councilor, 1730–40;

Judge of Court of Common Pleas, 1715–33;

Judge of Probate for Middlesex County, Massachusetts, 1725–45;

Justice of Superior Court, 1733–45;

Died September 20, 1745. Eulogy was given by Chief Justice Paul Dudley in court at Charlestown.

== Death and Descendants ==
Judge Remington died in office in 1745. Judge Remington and his cousin Gov. Jonathan Belcher were playmates and best friends all their lives. They were buried in one grave at Old Burying Ground, Cambridge, Ma. The site of their grave is contiguous to that of Judge Edmund Trowbridge and Edmund Trowbridge Dana. In that of Judge Trowbridge rest the remains of Washington Allston; of Chief Justice Francis Dana; of the poet Richard Henry Dana and others of the family.

The children of Jonathan Remington and Lucy Bradstreet were:

- Martha Remington (wife of Judge Edmund Trowbridge );
- Mary Remington (wife of Rev. Benjamin Stevens);
- Ann Remington (wife of William Ellery);

Descendants:

- Francis Dana;
- Richard Henry Dana Sr.;
- Richard Henry Dana Jr.;
- Edmund Trowbridge Dana;
- Washington Allston;
- William Ellery Channing;
- Walter Channing (physician);
- William Ellery Channing (poet);
- Joseph Stevens Buckminster;
- Edie Sedgwick;
- Kyra Sedgwick (6th Great-granddaughter of Judge Remington);

Legal offices
Preceded by John Cushing	Associate Justice of the Massachusetts Superior Court of Judicature; 1733-1745	Succeeded by Richard Saltonstall (jurist)
