= James Dana =

James Dana may refer to:

- James Dana (clergyman) (1735–1812), United States clergyman
- James Dwight Dana (1813–1895), American geologist, mineralogist and zoologist
- James Dana (mayor) (1811–1890), mayor of Charlestown, Massachusetts
- James Freeman Dana (1793–1827), United States chemist
