= 2nd Utah Territorial Legislature =

The 2nd Utah Territorial Legislature comprised members of the Territorial Council serving the second year of their terms, together with members of the House of Representatives elected to one-year terms. The regular election was held August 2, 1852. Due to multiple resignations in both chambers, a special election to fill the vacancies was held November 8, 1852. Members of the Territorial Council from the 1st Utah Territorial Legislature who resigned prior to the session included Orson Pratt, Orson Spencer, and John S. Fullmer.

== Session ==
The legislative session convened on December 13, 1852, in Salt Lake City, and ended on January 21, 1853. An additional special session was held beginning June 1, 1853.

== Members ==
Name	County	Office	Notes
Territorial Council:
Charles R. Dana	Weber		
Lorin Farr	Weber		
Orson Hyde	Salt Lake		Elected November 8, 1852
Aaron Johnson	Utah		
Heber C. Kimball	Salt Lake		
Isaac Morley	San Pete		
Asahel Perry	Utah		
Parley P. Pratt	Salt Lake		Elected November 8, 1852
Franklin D. Richards	Salt Lake		Elected August 2, 1852
Willard Richards	Salt Lake	President	
George A. Smith	Iron		
Thomas S. Smith	Davis		Elected November 8, 1852
Daniel H. Wells	Salt Lake		
Territorial House of Representatives:
Albern Allen	Weber		
Ezra T. Benson	Salt Lake		Elected November 8, 1852
George W. Brimhall	Iron		
John Brown	Salt Lake		Elected August 2, 1852, resigned prior to session
James G. Browning	Weber		
Anson Call	Millard		
Albert Carrington	Salt Lake		Elected November 8, 1852
James W. Cummings	Salt Lake		Elected August 2, 1852
Nathaniel H. Felt	Salt Lake		Elected August 2, 1852
Jedediah M. Grant	Salt Lake	Speaker	Elected August 2, 1852
Leonard E. Harrington	Utah		
Benjamin F. Johnson	Juab		Elected August 2, 1852, resigned prior to session
Nathaniel V. Jones	Salt Lake		Elected August 2, 1852, resigned prior to session
Andrew L. Lamoreaux	Davis		Elected August 2, 1852, resigned prior to session
Andrew Love	Juab		Elected November 8, 1852
Willard G. McMullen	Weber		
Henry W. Miller	Davis		Elected November 8, 1852
William Pace	Utah		
Albert Petty	San Pete		
William W. Phelps	Salt Lake		Elected August 2, 1852
Albert P. Rockwood	Salt Lake		Elected August 2, 1852
John Rowberry	Tooele		
John L. Smith	Iron		
Lorenzo Snow	Salt Lake		Elected November 8, 1852
Daniel Spencer	Salt Lake		Elected August 2, 1852, resigned prior to session
John Stoker	Davis		
Hosea Stout	Salt Lake		Elected August 2, 1852, resigned prior to session
George B. Wallace	Salt Lake		Elected November 8, 1852
Edson Whipple	Utah		
Wilford Woodruff	Salt Lake		Elected August 2, 1852
Edwin D. Woolley	Salt Lake		Elected August 2, 1852
Jonathan C. Wright	Salt Lake		Elected August 2, 1852
