= Richard Dana =

Richard Dana may refer to:

- Richard Dana (lawyer) (1699–1772), American lawyer and politician, father of Francis Dana
- Richard Henry Dana Sr. (1787–1879), American poet and author, son of Francis Dana
- Richard Henry Dana Jr. (1815–1882), American lawyer and author, son of Dana Sr.
- Richard Henry Dana III (1851–1931), American lawyer, son of Dana Jr., and his son Richard Henry Dana IV
