= Asael =

Asael (Hebrew: עשהאל, "Made by God") is a Hebrew name. Notable people with the name include:

- Asael (angel), fallen angel described in the Book of Enoch
- Asael Bielski (1908–1945), Belarusian Jewish partisan
- Asael Lubotzky (born 1983), Israeli physician and writer
- Asael Ben Shabat (born 1988), Israeli footballer
- David Asael Smith (1879–1952), American Latter Day Saint leader
- Anthony Asael (born 1974), Belgian photographer

== See also ==
- Asahel (given name)
