= Martin v. Massachusetts =

Martin v. Commonwealth of Massachusetts (1 Mass. Reports 348) was an 1805 legal case decided by the Supreme Judicial Court of Massachusetts, presided over by Francis Dana. It was influential in setting a legal precedent that US married women did not have separate formal political citizenship from their husbands.

== Facts of the case ==
James Martin was the son of William Martin and Anna Gordon Martin, British Loyalists who had fled Massachusetts during the political turmoil of the American Revolution. Anna Gordon Martin had brought significant amounts of real estate into her marriage; through a complicated set of legal arrangements, her husband William had only a life interest in the property. After her father’s death in 1770, Anna inherited over 800 acres of land, a farm, a house and stables. Because the Martins, like other Loyalists, had fled Massachusetts, the post-revolutionary government of Massachusetts had confiscated Anna Gordon Martin's land as state property.

James Martin, as the couple's adult son, trained as a lawyer and practiced in Boston and the British West Indies. He brought his family’s case to court and argued that his mother had been required to choose between following her husband (as required by the marital law of coverture or subordination) or staying in Massachusetts (and keeping her land). He argued that his mother had not meant to forfeit her land and that he should be able to claim it back from the state.

== Legal issues ==
The main issue in this case was whether Anna Gordon Martin had, during her life, possessed the legal ability to choose whether to stay in Massachusetts. Could she, as a married woman, make her own choices about remaining a British citizen or declaring loyalty to the revolutionary government of Massachusetts? Did the law of coverture, which stated that a married man and his wife were the same legal person, mean that women could not be held legally responsible for their own choices?

The Massachusetts Attorney General stated that in this particular case, Anna had acted in an independent way and that she was seen as a traitor in her own right, and her lands duly confiscated; the case also noted that while Anna's husband controlled the lands, he did not own them, and if he died before Anna, the land would be inherited by Anna's family.

The court ultimately ruled in James' favor, stating that Anna had left the country by being withdrawn by her husband, and that the property of femes covert could not be confiscated; Anna was seen as having 'no will', but being "under the direction and control of her husband ... bound to obey his commands". The court ruled that "infants, insane, femes-covert ... cannot act freely".

== Impact ==
Martin v. Massachusetts established the principle in US law that a married woman's citizenship followed that of her husband. This principle became part of statutory law with the Expatriation Act of 1907, and until the passage of the Cable Act in 1922, American citizen women who married noncitizens automatically lost their US citizenship.
