= Jedediah Foster Homesite =

- U.S. National Register of Historic Places
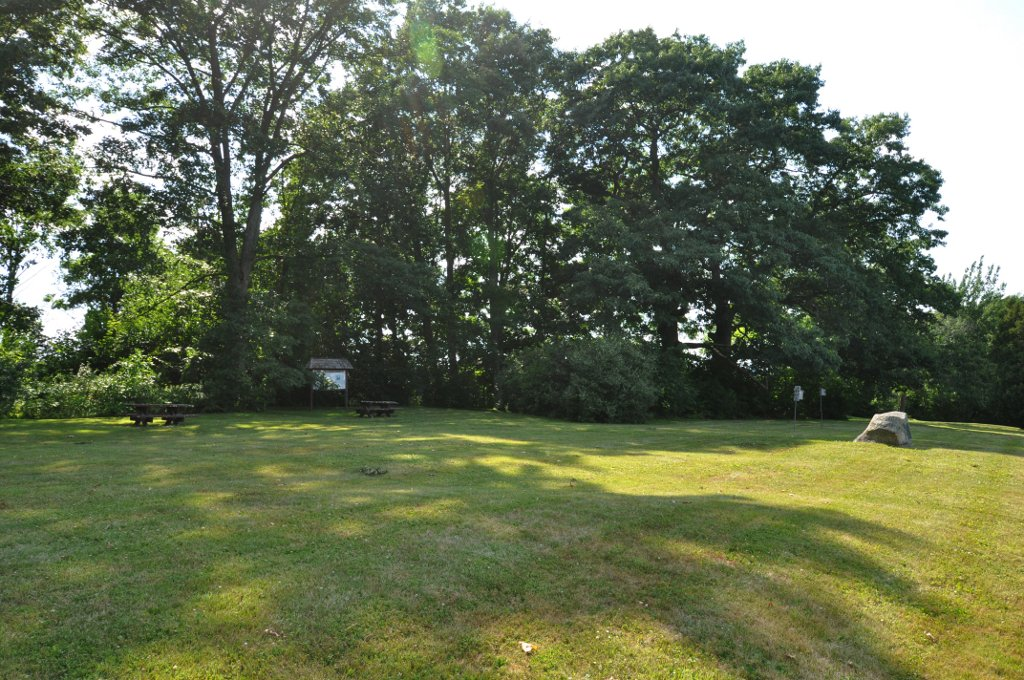

- Location within Massachusetts Location within the United States
- Location: Foster Hill Rd., West Brookfield, Massachusetts
- Coordinates: 42.232636°N 72.128533°W
- NRHP reference No.: 13000623
- Added to NRHP: August 27, 2013

The Jedediah Foster Homesite is a historic archeological site on Foster Hill Road in West Brookfield, Massachusetts. The 0.5-acre (0.20 ha) site was the location of the stately 18th century home of Jedediah Foster, which was built in 1735 by his father-in-law, Joseph Dwight. Dwight (1703-1765) was a leading military figure in colonial Massachusetts, and was active locally in public service. Foster (1726-1779) was one of the most influential figures of his day in central Massachusetts. He served in the provincial assembly from 1761 to 1775, and supported American independence. In 1779 he was a member of the select committee of the constitutional convention that drafted the Massachusetts State Constitution (although John Adams is generally credited with doing most of the committee's work). Foster's home remained in family hands until it was given to the Quaboag Historical Society in 1902. It was shortly afterward destroyed by fire, and only foundations and other remnants survive. It is now a small local park.

The site was listed on the National Register of Historic Places in 2013.

== See also ==
- National Register of Historic Places listings in Worcester County, Massachusetts
