= Rain follows the plow =

Incorrect climatology hypothesis

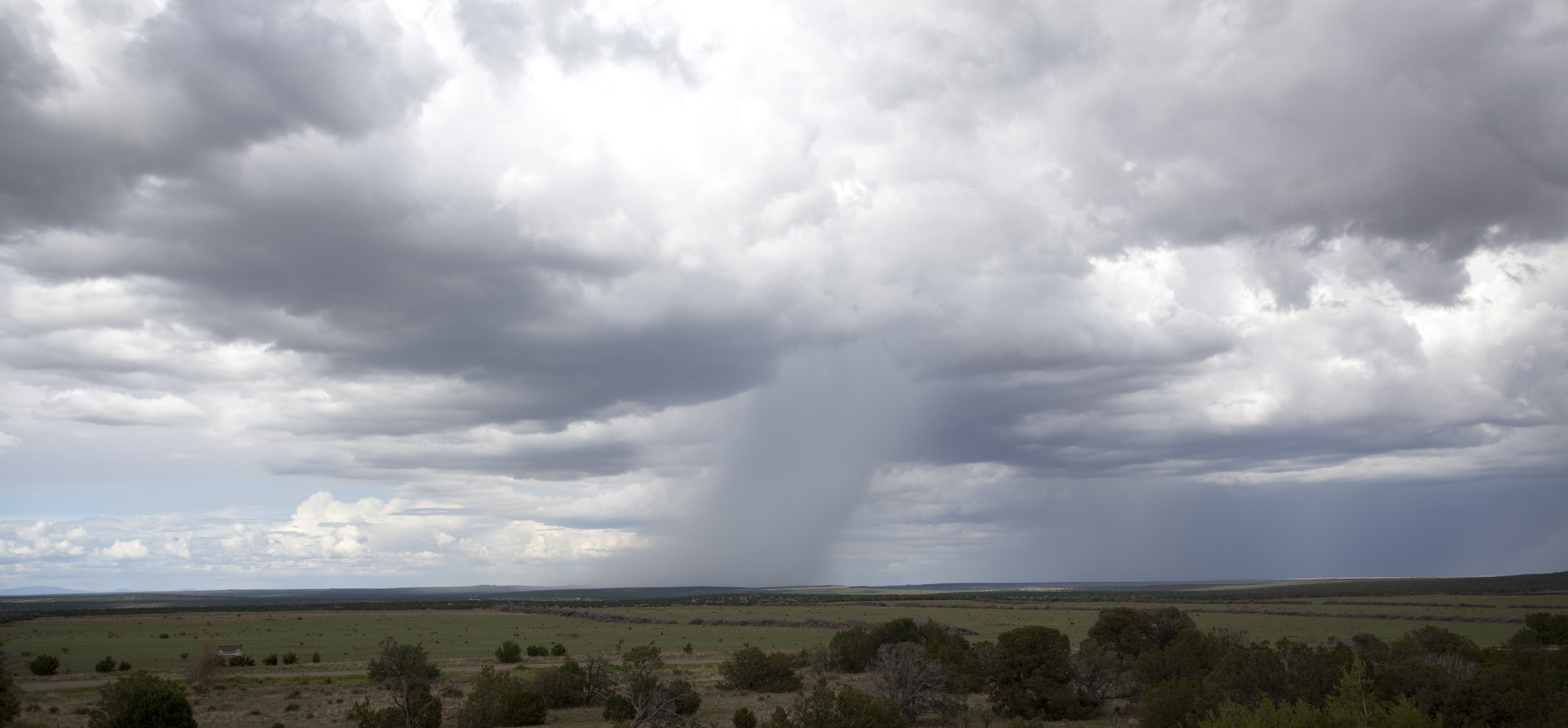
Monsoon rains upon the high plains of the American West.

Rain follows the plow is the conventional name for a now-discredited theory of climatology that was popular throughout the American West and Australia during the late 19th century. The phrase was employed as a summation of the theory by Charles Dana Wilber:

God speed the plow. ... By this wonderful provision, which is only man's mastery over nature, the clouds are dispensing copious rains ... [the plow] is the instrument which separates civilization from savagery; and converts a desert into a farm or garden. ... To be more concise, Rain follows the plow.

The basic premise of the theory was that human habitation and agriculture through homesteading caused permanent change in the climate of arid and semi-arid regions, making these regions more humid. The theory was widely promoted in the 1870s as a justification for the settlement of the Great Plains, a region previously known as the "Great American Desert". It was also used to justify the expansion of wheat growing on marginal land in South Australia during the same period.

According to the theory, increased human settlement in the region and cultivation of soil would result in an increased rainfall over time, rendering the land more fertile and lush as the population increased. As later historical records of rainfall indicated, the theory was based on faulty evidence arising from brief climatological fluctuations that happened to coincide with settlement, an example of the logical fallacy that correlation means causation. The theory was later refuted by climatologists and is now definitively regarded as false.

== North America ==
The theory arose in the late 1860s and 1870s as American settlement expanded west of the Missouri River and across the 100th meridian west. This was the traditional boundary line between the humid and semi-arid portions of central North America. Specifically, in the early part of the decade, white settlement had spread into central and western Nebraska along the Platte River. Emigrants on the Oregon Trail began reporting that the land in western Nebraska, previously known for its yellowed, dry vegetation during the summer, had seemingly become green.

Out of this evidence, some scientists concluded that the apparent increase in rain was due to the settlement and the effects of cultivation. One of the most prominent exponents of the theory in the United States was Cyrus Thomas, who was a noted ethnologist and entomologist but only an amateur climatologist at best. After studying the recent history of Colorado, he concluded that the increase in moisture was permanent, and that it coincided exactly with the first settlers' cultivating of the land. Other prominent advocates of the theory were Ferdinand Vandeveer Hayden, the noted geographer who had explored and surveyed parts of the Rocky Mountains of Colorado; Samuel Aughey, a professor at the University of Nebraska; and Charles Dana Wilber, an amateur scientist and author.

Thomas and other climatologists offered a variety of explanations for the theory. A common idea was that the plowing of the soil for cultivation exposed the soil's moisture to the sky. In addition, newly planted trees and shrubs increased rainfall as well, as did smoke from trains, or even the metal in the rails or the telegraph wires. Another hypothesis stated that the increased vibrations in the atmosphere due to human activity created additional clouds, from which rain fell. This idea led to the widespread dynamiting of the air across the Great Plains in the 1870s.

The theory was widely embraced in its day, not only by scientists, but land speculators and emigrants. Some historians have argued that the theory was embraced readily as an outgrowth of Manifest Destiny, the idea that the United States had a mission to expand, spreading its form of democracy and freedom. The theory is regarded as partially responsible for the rapid settlement of the Great Plains in the later 19th century. In The Great Valleys and Prairies of Nebraska and the Northwest, published in 1881, Charles Dana Wilber wrote:

In this miracle of progress, the plow was the unerring prophet, the procuring cause, not by any magic or enchantment, not by incantations or offerings, but instead by the sweat of his face toiling with his hands, man can persuade the heavens to yield their treasures of dew and rain upon the land he has chosen for his dwelling... ...The raindrop never fails to fall and answer to the imploring power or prayer of labor.

William Gilpin, the first territorial governor of Colorado and an aide to President Abraham Lincoln, was a proponent of this theory. Gilpin was a strong believer in the idea of Manifest Destiny. One of his books was called The Mission of the North American People. He strongly promoted western settlement and invoked this theory as one of his reasons for people to migrate west.

Climatologists now understand that increased vegetation and urbanization can result in increased precipitation. The effect, however, is local in scope, with increased rainfall typically coming at the expense of rainfall in nearby areas. It cannot result in a climatological change for an entire region. They also understand that the Great Plains had had a wetter-than-usual few seasons while this theory was developed and increasing settlement were both taking place. When normal arid conditions returned, homesteaders suffered.

In 2007, Richard Raddatz, a climatologist at the University of Winnipeg, published results of his studies on the conversion of Canadian grasslands to cropland. His theory is that, because corn crops transpire moisture into the atmosphere at a faster rate than the grass they have replaced, crops can generate storms and intensify the season during which water can cycle through the atmosphere.

Observed trends of Midwest summertime cooling and increased rainfall over the last third of the 20th century have been linked to agricultural practices in the arid Great Plains, in an inversion of the Dust Bowl scenario. Increased precipitation and humidity may cause the downward trend in Midwestern average daytime highs, since humid air takes more energy to heat to a given temperature than dry air. In turn, the increase in Midwestern rainfall may be driven by the large increase in land under irrigation in the Plains over the 20th century. Irrigation water enters the atmosphere through evaporation and plant transpiration, and then falls as rain over the downwind Midwest.

== Australia ==
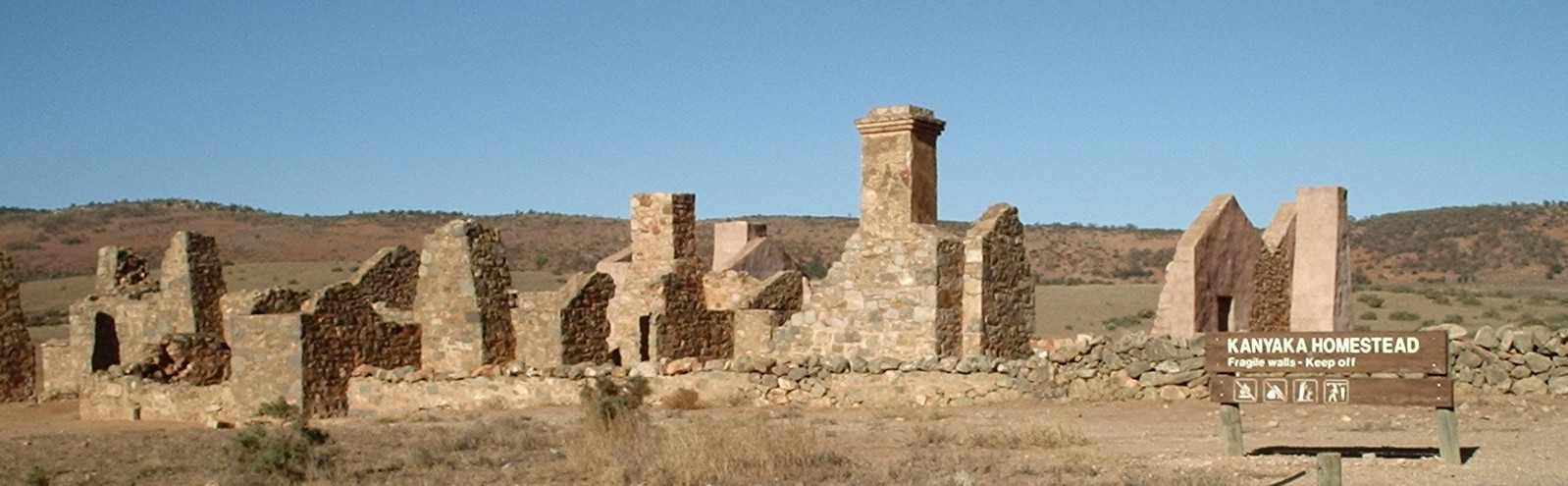
The Kanyaka sheep farm (Flinders Ranges, South Australia) was built at a high cost in the 1850s and abandoned after the drought of 1869.

At the same time that the theory existed in North America, it also existed on the farming frontier in South Australia. There was a spread of farming from the area near Adelaide northwards to areas of much lower rainfall. In South Australia, George Goyder warned as early as 1865, in his famous report on farming in the state, that rain would not follow the plow.

Despite this, until further droughts in the 1880s, farmers talked of cultivating cereal crops up to the Northern Territory border, which follows the 26th parallel south. Today, however, grain crops still do not grow further north than Quorn (near the 32nd parallel south), as advised by Goyder's original report.
