= Olive E. Dana =

American short story writer, essayist, poet

Olive Eliza Dana
- Born: December 24, 1859; Augusta, Maine, U.S.
- Died: February 3, 1904
- Resting place: Riverside Cemetery, Augusta, Maine, U.S.
- Occupation: author
- Relatives: Dana family, Thomas Savage
- Writing career
- Language: English
- Genres: short-stories, essays, poetry, sketches, juvenile literature
- Notable works: Under Friendly Eaves, "The Magi", "The Laggard Land"

Olive E. Dana (December 24, 1859 – February 3, 1904) was an American writer of short-stories, essays, poetry, and sketches. Her literary showed her New England heritage. She was born in Augusta, Maine, in 1859, where she always lived. After high school graduation, she began to write for the press and was a regular contributor in prose and verse to many of the literary and religious publications.

== Early life and education ==
Dana was born in Augusta, Maine, to parents James Wolcott Dana and Sarah W. Savage, a descendant of Richard Dana, whose name appears in the records of Cambridge, Massachusetts, in 1640, and the founder of the Dana family, which included patriots, soldiers, preachers, editors, authors, scientists, college presidents and professors who contributed to the social, literary, and political advancement of the United States. Her great-grandfather, Phineas Dana, a descendant of Joseph Dana, the second son of the original Richard, settled in Oxford, Massachusetts. He married Mehitabel Wolcott, daughter of Josiah Wolcott and his wife Isabella, daughter of the Rev. John Campbell, who for 40 years as pastor of the church at Oxford, Massachusetts. An early ancestor of Dana's on the maternal side was Major Thomas Savage, who arrived in Boston from England in 1633. The New England line included James Savage, one of the earliest and most prominent settlers of Augusta, Maine.

Dana graduated from the Augusta, Maine High School in 1877, the same year she published her first article.

== Career ==
Dana’s works included poems, short stories and essays, many for young people. Her collected short stories were published in the volume Under Friendly Eaves in 1894, which revealed her New England heritage. Its 22 stories are prefaced with a poem by the author. Many were short stories for children and young people. Dana, also a poet, wrote verses that included "The Summons", "Explanation," "For Light," "Shakespeare's Day," and "It Always Comes" about nature and humanity. She also wrote a column for the Journal of Education and regularly contributed to Good Housekeeping, Portland Transcript, Illustrated Christian Weekly, and Cottage Hearth. "The Magi" is illustrative as one of her most popular poetic abilities. She published some 300 articles after her literary career began. Her work covered home topics and reviews, biographical sketches and short stories.

== Personal life ==
Between 1884 and 1904, while still writing, Dana was active in church, philanthropic and educational movements of the day and was a founder of the Current Events Club of Augusta, serving as president for two years. She was also a member of the Unity Club, and one of her most noted poems, "The Laggard Land", was written for a banquet held at this literary society.

Ill health often interfered with her writing. Dana died at age 44 in Augusta, Maine, February 3, 1904, and is interred at the Riverside Cemetery in Augusta.

== Selected works ==
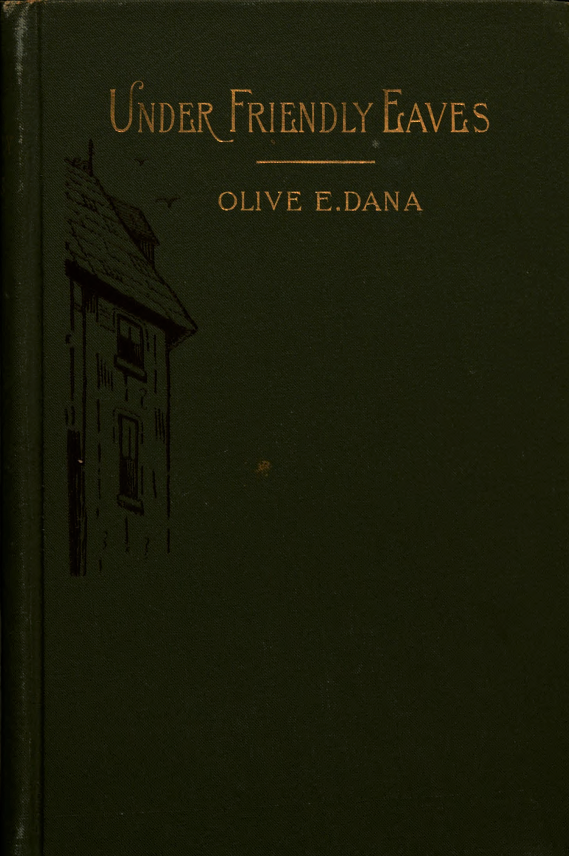
Under Friendly Eaves, 1894

- James T. Fields, 1816-1881., 1887
- Columbus : birthday exercise, 1891
- Thanksgiving Day, 1892
- Alfred Tennsyon. A Memorial Exercise, 1892
- John Greenleaf Whittier, 1892
- Autumn's Promise, 1892
- Flower-Faith, 1893
- A Roll-Call of Heroes, 1893
- Thankfulness, 1893
- Some April Birthdays, 1893
- Love's Errand, 1893
- Memorable May Days, 1893
- October Birthdays, 1893
- Some September Days, 1893
- Midwinter Birthdays, 1893
- New England's Story, 1893
- The Christmas Hope, 1894
- The Silent Speech, 1894
- New Year's Voices, 1894
- February Birthdays, 1894
- Under Friendly Eaves, 1894
- Decoration Day, 1895
- A Song for September, 1895
- The Way of the Harvest, 1895
- Portland and Its Associations, 1895
- Vacation Clubs, 1895
- A Believer in the Ideal, 1895
- The Christ-Child's Gifts, 1895
- The First Day, 1896
- Abraham Lincoln. An Original Exercise for the Schoolroom, 1896
- The Reapers, 1896
- Arbor Day, 1896
- Her Meaning, 1896
- Abraham Lincoln -- the man and his work : a programme for the twelfth of February, 1897
- Washington and His Friends, 1898
- An Afternoon with the Old Masters, 1898
- Shakespeare's Day.—April 23, 1898
- Songs of Thanksgiving, 1899
- Christmas Joys.—An Exercise, 1899
- Planting the Trees, 1899
- Our Constitution: Its Makers and Its Making, 1907
