= Jack Dana =

American basketball player

Personal information
- Born: December 17, 1921
- Died: January 1983 (aged 62) Lafayette, California, U.S.

Career information
- High school: Piedmont (Piedmont, California)
- College: Stanford (1941–1943)
- Position: Forward

Career highlights
- NCAA champion (1942)

Jack Herbert Dana (December 17, 1921 – January 1983) was an American basketball player.

== Basketball career ==
A forward from Piedmont High School in Piedmont, California, Dana played collegiately for Stanford University. He was a reserve on Stanford's 1942 national championship team, but in the championship game, starting forward Jim Pollard had the flu and was unable to play. Dana started in Pollard's place, played all 40 minutes, and scored 14 points, one point behind high scorer Howie Dallmar.

== After college ==
Dana received an engineering degree from Stanford, then served in the United States Navy during World War II, and was honorably discharged as a lieutenant. He earned an MBA from Stanford and married Renée Cohu, daughter of airline executive La Motte Cohu, in 1948. Dana was a prominent insurance broker. He and his wife had two children and were married until his wife's suicide in 1970. Dana died in 1983. He was posthumously inducted into the Piedmont High School sports hall of fame.
