= Dano (name) =

Dano is both a surname and a given name. Notable people with the name include:

Surname:

- Hutch Dano (born 1992), American actor
- Linda Dano (born 1943), American actress
- Paul Dano (born 1984), American actor and producer
- Royal Dano (1922–1994), American actor

Given name:

- Dano Halsall (born 1963), Swiss former swimmer
- Dano Pantić (born 1972), Serbian judoka
- Dano Raffanti (born 1948), Italian operatic tenor
