= Fra M. Dana =

American painter

Fra Broadwell Dinwiddie Dana
- Born: November 26, 1874; Terre Haute, Indiana
- Died: December 1, 1948 (aged 74); Great Falls, Montana
- Education: Studied under Joseph H. Sharp, William M. Chase, Alfred Maurer, and Mary Cassatt
- Occupation: Painter
- Style: Impressionism

Fra Broadwell Dinwiddie Dana (November 26, 1874 – December 1, 1948) was an American painter. Dana showed promise early in her life as a gifted painter, studying at acclaimed art schools and learning under masters in the style of impressionism. Her artwork and legacy, which went relatively unnoticed during her lifetime, has gained greater recognition in the decades following her death.

== Early life and training ==
Fra Broadwell was born on November 26, 1874, to Julia and John Broadwell in Terre Haute, Indiana. Three years after Fra's birth, Julia Broadwell divorced John Broadwell and relocated with her daughter to Rockville, Indiana, where Fra lived until she was 16 years old. It was in Rockville that Julia Broadwell met and married James Dinwiddie, who became Fra's stepfather and supporter of her dreams as an artist. Fra Dana was then sent to Cincinnati, Ohio, in 1890 to study painting at the Cincinnati Art Academy with Joseph H. Sharp.

From 1896 to 1900, Dana studied under acclaimed artist William Merritt Chase in New York City at the Chase School and the New York School of Art. During her years working with Chase, Dana left an undeniable impression on her mentor, as evidenced in his Portrait of Mrs. Dana. Later, she studied art in Paris under Alfred Henry Maurer and Mary Cassatt.

Following James Dinwiddie's death in 1890, Dana's mother remarried to James' brother, William Colfax Dinwiddie, and relocated to Dayton, Wyoming. Dana made her second trip to Wyoming to visit her family in 1893, around which time she met her future husband: cattle rancher, Edwin Lester Dana.

== Marriage ==
Fra and Edwin married July 1, 1896. The couple lived on the 2A Ranch in Big Horn County, Montana, on the Crow Indian Reservation, just over the state line from Parkman, Wyoming, until moving to Great Falls, Montana, in 1937. Edwin Dana had been a cattle rancher most of his life, buying his own Hereford cattle herd for $150 in 1887. By 1918, the Danas ranch was home to one of the largest Hereford cattle herds in the United States on a ranch of 400,000 acres. Along with her art, Fra helped Edwin with ranch work while also serving as his secretary and bookkeeper for the business. Although at times feeling confined to the demands of ranch life, Fra Dana continued traveling across the world to develop her art and experience the high culture that she had grown accustomed to in her youth. Sometimes she would be accompanied with her husband but, more often than not, Fra would travel the world on her own in a time when it was uncommon for married women to travel alone.

== Later years ==
Following a mental breakdown in 1911 while on her own in New York City, Dana's physical and mental health began to decline. After this, Edwin travelled with her more often, but her health seemed to stabilize for a period. In 1937, she moved to Great Falls, Montana while her husband continued working at their second ranch in Cascade County, Montana, roughly 50 miles apart. Fra Dana began to grow frail with what turned out to be cancer. Edwin Dana died in Great Falls on December 14, 1946, at the age of 82. Fra Dana died December 1, 1948, in Great Falls, Montana, at the age of 74. In her will, Fra Dana left many of her personal artworks and those in her collection to the University of Montana. Fra's life and artwork, although relatively obscure during her lifetime, garnered greater recognition in the final few years of her life and following her death.
