= James Freeman Dana =

American chemist (1793–1827)

- Born: 23 September 1793; Amherst, New Hampshire, US
- Died: 14 April 1827 (aged 33); New York City, US
- Spouse: Matilda Webber
- Awards: Boylston Prize

Academic background
- Education: Harvard College; Harvard Medical School

Academic work
- Discipline: Chemistry; Mineralogy
- Institutions: Dartmouth College; New York College of Physicians and Surgeons
- Notable works: Epitome of Chemical Philosophy

James Freeman Dana (born in Amherst, New Hampshire, 23 September 1793; died in New York City, 14 April 1827) was an American chemist.

== Biography ==
He graduated from Harvard in 1813, and from the medical school in 1817. He studied with Dr. John Gorham, and developed such ability that in 1815 he was selected by the authorities of Harvard to procure for the chemical laboratory a new outfit of apparatus. For this purpose, he visited London, where for six months he worked in the laboratory of Friedrich Christian Accum.

On his return to the United States he settled in Cambridge, where he practised medicine and was appointed assistant to the chair in chemistry. In 1817 he was invited to lecture on chemistry at Dartmouth, and in 1820 became the first professor of chemistry and mineralogy there. He was chosen professor of chemistry in the New York College of Physicians and Surgeons in 1825, and continued as such until his death.

== Works ==
While a student in Cambridge, he received the Boylston Prize for a dissertation on the "Tests for Arsenic," and again in 1817 received the same prize for an essay on the "Composition of Oxymuriatic Acid." He contributed numerous scientific memoirs to Silliman's American Journal of Science and to the Annals of the New York Lyceum of Natural History, such as "On the theory of the action of the deutoxide of azote, or nitrous gas in eudiometry". His larger works are Outlines of Mineralogy and Geology of Boston and its Vicinity (Boston, 1818), coauthored with his brother Samuel Luther Dana, and Epitome of Chemical Philosophy (Concord, New Hampshire, 1825).
