= Asahel Thomson =

American politician (1790–1866)

Member of the Connecticut House of Representatives
- In office 1850 and 1858

Personal details
- Born: April 16, 1790 Farmington, Connecticut, U.S.
- Died: May 2, 1866 (aged 76) Farmington, Connecticut, U.S.
- Education: Yale University
- Occupation: Politician; physician

Asahel Thomson (April 16, 1790 – May 2, 1866) was an American physician and politician from Connecticut

== Early life ==
Asahel Thomas was born on April 16, 1790, in Farmington, Connecticut, to Eunice (née Fitch) and Jonathan Thomson. He graduated from Yale University in 1810.

== Career ==
Following graduation, Thomas taught for two years at Ellsworth Academy in Sharon, Connecticut. He then taught for a third year at East Windsor Academy. In 1813, he was a private tutor for Woodlawn, Virginia, for the family of Lawrence Lewis.

In the spring of 1815 he began studying medicine with Dr. Eli Todd, of Farmington. He attended the medical lectures of that and the following winters, at Yale Medical School. He then began the practice of medicine in Farmington until his death.

Thomson served as a member of the Connecticut State Legislature, in 1850, and again in 1858.

== Personal life ==
Thomson died on May 2, 1866, in Farmington. He received an honorary Doctor of Medicine degree of from Yale College in 1859.
