= William Dana =

William Dana or Bill Dana may refer to:

- Bill Dana (1924–2017), stage name of William Szathmary, American comedian, actor, and screenwriter
- William H. Dana (1930–2014), NASA test pilot and astronaut
- William Parsons Winchester Dana (1833–1927), American artist
- Mrs. William Starr Dana, name used by Frances Theodora Parsons (1861–1952), American botanist and author

== See also ==
- William Dana Ewart, American inventor
- William Dana Orcutt, American book designer
