= Charles Dana Wilber =

American journalist

Charles Dana Wilber (July 4, 1830, in Auburn, Ohio – December 20, 1891, in Aurora, Illinois) was a land speculator, journalist, writer, and a noted booster of the American West as a site of agricultural development. He founded the town of Wilber, Nebraska in 1873.

Born in Auburn, Ohio, Wilber is best known for coining the phrase "Rain follows the plow", a paraphrase of earlier American climatologists, notably the United States Geological Survey's official agronomist for the Hayden Survey of 1871, Cyrus Thomas. His principal book, The Great Valleys and Prairies of Nebraska and the Northwest was published in 1881. A single paragraph from this work exemplified Wilber's thesis that the Trans-Mississippi West was destined for agrarian settlement and that conversion from desert to the garden would result from the condensation of humid wind:

"Suppose (an army of frontier farmers) 50 miles, in width, from Manitoba to Texas, could acting in concert, turn over the prairie sod, and after deep plowing and receiving the rain and moisture, present a new surface of green growing crops instead of dry, hard-baked earth covered with sparse buffalo grass. No one can question or doubt the inevitable effect of this cooling condensing surface upon the moisture in the atmosphere as it moves over by the Western winds. A reduction of temperature must at once occur, accompanied by the usual phenomena of showers. The chief agency in this transformation is agriculture. To be more concise. Rain follows the plow."
