= Asahel Stearns =

American politician

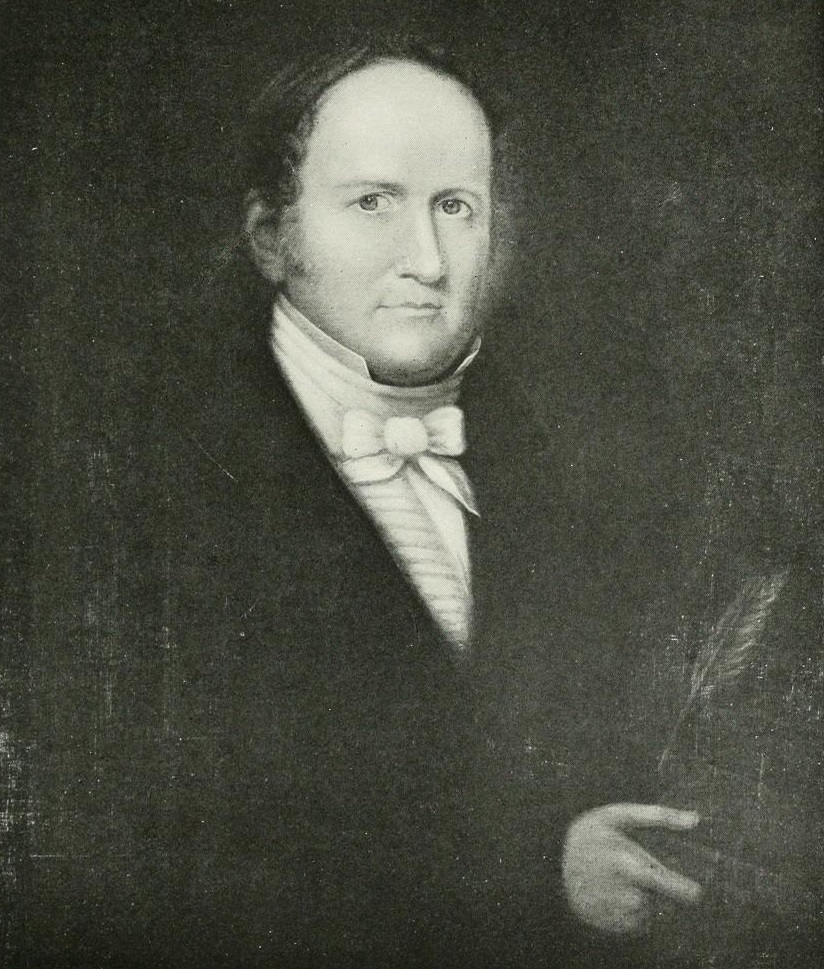

Member of the U.S. House of Representatives from Massachusetts's 4th district
- In office March 4, 1815 – March 3, 1817
- Preceded by: Samuel Dana
- Succeeded by: Timothy Fuller

Member of the Massachusetts Senate
- In office 1817

Member of the Massachusetts House of Representatives
- In office 1830-1831

Personal details
- Born: June 17, 1774 Lunenburg, Province of Massachusetts Bay, British America
- Died: February 5, 1839 (aged 64) Cambridge, Massachusetts, U.S.
- Party: Federalist
- Education: Harvard University
- Occupation: Lawyer

Asahel Stearns (June 17, 1774 – February 5, 1839) was a U.S. representative from Massachusetts.

Born in Lunenburg in the Province of Massachusetts Bay, Stearns graduated from Harvard University in 1797. He studied law, was admitted to the bar and commenced the practice of law in Chelmsford, Massachusetts. He served as member of the Massachusetts Senate in 1813, the same year he was elected a Fellow of the American Academy of Arts and Sciences. He moved to Charlestown, Massachusetts, in 1815.

Stearns was elected as a Federalist to the Fourteenth Congress (March 4, 1815 – March 3, 1817). He served in the Massachusetts House of Representatives in 1817. He was professor of law at Harvard University from 1817 to 1829. He again served as a member of the Massachusetts Senate in 1830 and 1831. He died in Cambridge, Massachusetts, February 5, 1839. He was interred in Mount Auburn Cemetery.

U.S. House of Representatives
Preceded by Samuel Dana	Member of the U.S. House of Representatives from Massachusetts's 4th congressional district March 4, 1815 – March 3, 1817	Succeeded by Timothy Fuller
