= Richard Henry Dana III =

American lawyer (1851–1931)

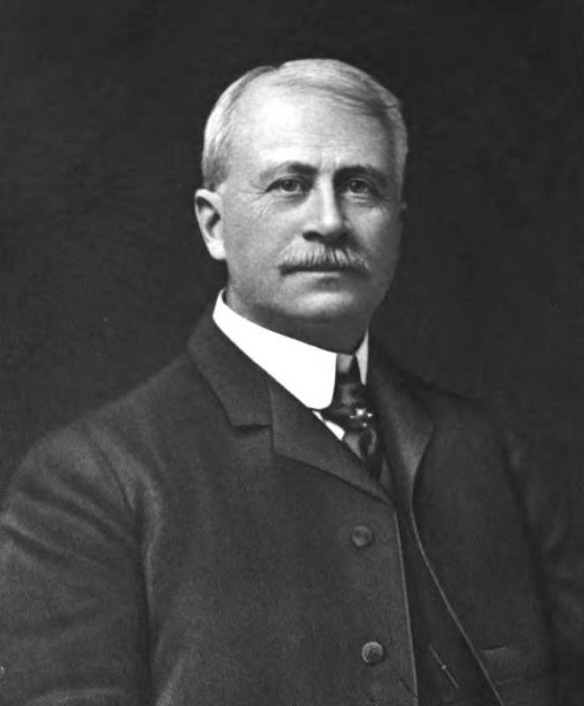
- Born: January 3, 1851; Cambridge, Massachusetts
- Died: December 16, 1931 (aged 80); Cambridge, Massachusetts
- Education: Harvard University
- Occupation: Lawyer
- Spouses: Edith Longfellow (m. 1878; died 1915) Helen Ford Mumford (m. 1922)
- Children: 6, inc. Henry Wadsworth Longfellow Dana
- Parents: Richard Henry Dana Jr. (father); Sarah Watson (mother)

Signature
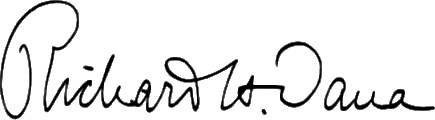

Richard Henry Dana III (January 3, 1851 – December 16, 1931) was an American lawyer and civil service reformer.

== Early life ==
Dana was born in Cambridge, Massachusetts on January 3, 1851, the son of lawyer and politician Richard Henry Dana Jr. and Sarah (née Watson) Dana (1814–1907). His paternal grandfather was poet and critic Richard Henry Dana Sr.

Dana graduated from Harvard University. In 1874, he looked back on those years: "Days in college were happy-go-lucky times, even for the most studious and athletic."

== Career ==
Dana was the author of the Massachusetts Ballot Act of 1888, the first statewide secret ballot act passed in the United States.

Dana wrote a substantial biography of his father, Richard Henry Dana Jr. He became a friend and financial adviser to Hosea Ballou Morse, whom he introduced to Theodore Roosevelt.

He was a major leader of Mugwumps, especially through his editorship of the Civil Service Record. His people took credit for passing the state's 1884 civil service law, which was a stronger version of the federal Pendleton Act of 1883. Both laws were enacted to limit the effect of political patronage, thus disrupting the spoils system. The goal were improved morality and increased efficiency. It was also designed to contain the rising political power of the Irish Catholics.

He died at his home in Cambridge on December 16, 1931.

=== Legacy ===
The papers and photographs of Dana, together with material relating to him collected by his son, Henry Wadsworth Longfellow Dana, and his sister, Elizabeth, are held at the Longfellow House–Washington's Headquarters National Historic Site. Some family financial records are held at the Houghton Library, Harvard, these include correspondence between Dana and William Penn Cresson, relating to the Cresson's biography of Francis Dana. A number of letters are in the Abernathy Collections at the Middlebury College library, though these may be by his father. A substantial collection of family papers (including 293 bound volumes and 81 boxes) is held at the Massachusetts Historical Society. Family papers are also found at the Arthur and Elizabeth Schlesinger Library.

== Personal life ==
On January 10, 1878, Dana married Edith Longfellow (1853–1915), the daughter of poet Henry Wadsworth Longfellow. Before her death in 1915, they had four sons and two daughters. Edith's brother, Ernest Longfellow, disinherited some of their children for holding socialist and pacifist beliefs. Their children were:

- Richard Henry Dana IV (1879–1933), a World War I conscientious objector and architect.
- Henry "Harry" Wadsworth Longfellow Dana (1881–1950), scholar of Soviet drama, pacifist, socialist, and gay liberationist.
- Frances Appleton Dana (1883–1933), who married Henry Casimir de Rham, a grandson of Charles de Rham, in 1905. She befriended Franklin Roosevelt but died in 1933 of suicide.
- Allston Dana (1884–1952)
- Edmund Trowbridge Dana III (1886–1981), who married Jessie Halladay. She committed suicide in 1915.
- Delia Farley Dana (1889–1989), who became a socialist and feminist; she married fellow socialist Robert Hare Hutchinson in 1913.

After Edith's 1915 death, he remarried Helen Ford Mumford (1865–1934) in 1922.
