= Richard Dana (lawyer) =

American lawyer

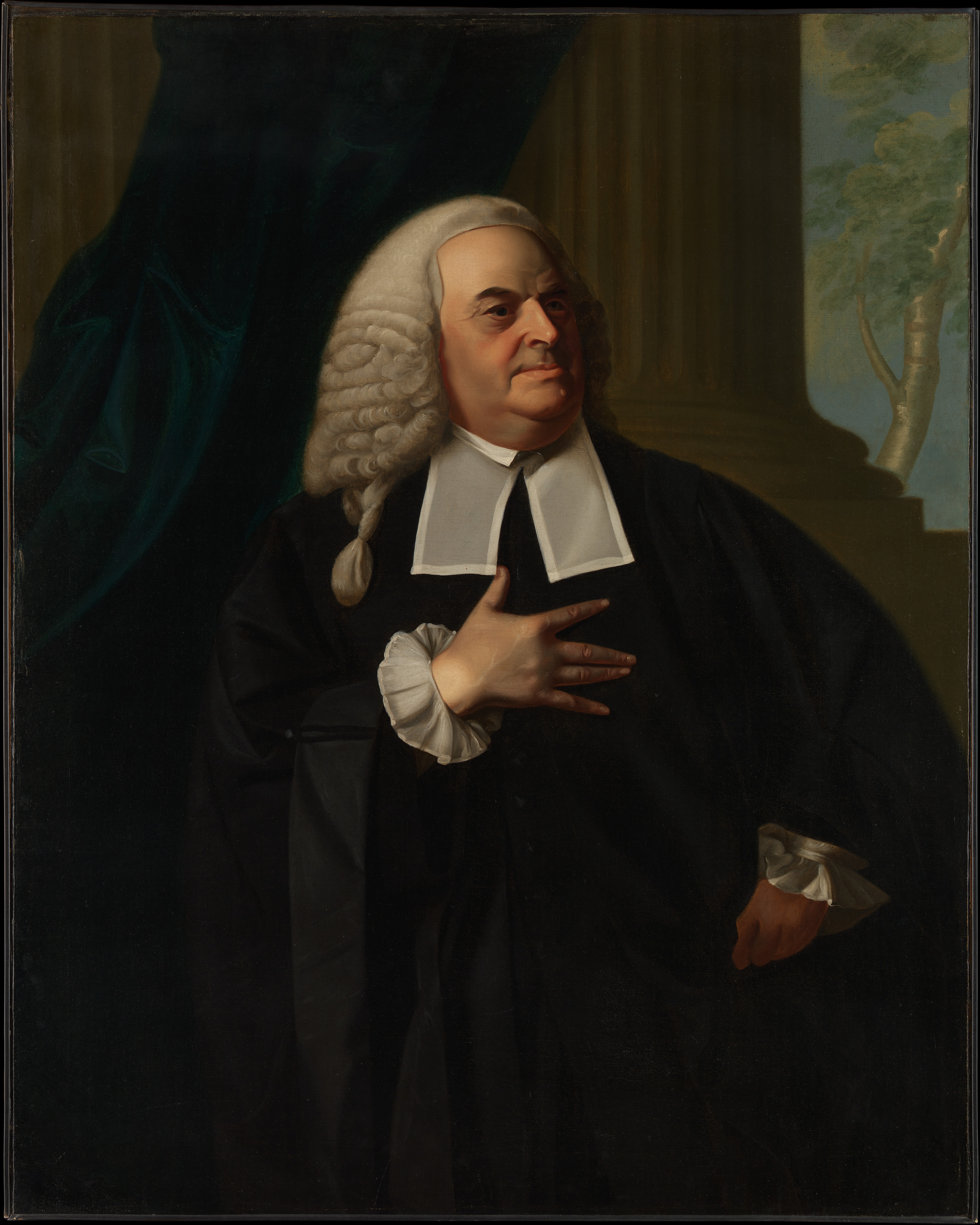
- Portrait of Richard Dana by John Singleton Copley (c. 1770)

Member of the Massachusetts House of Representatives for Marblehead
- In office 1738-1738

Personal details
- Born: June 26, 1700 Cambridge, Massachusetts, US
- Died: May 17, 1772 (aged 71) Boston, Massachusetts, US
- Spouse: Lydia Trowbridge (m. 1737)
- Relations: Dana
- Children: 7, including Francis
- Parent(s): Daniel Dana; Naomi Croswell
- Education: Harvard College

Richard Dana (June 26, 1700 – May 17, 1772) was a prominent lawyer and politician in colonial Massachusetts, and member of the Dana family.

== Early life ==
Coat of Arms of Richard Dana

Dana was born in Cambridge, Massachusetts on June 26, 1700. He was the son of Daniel Dana (1664–1749) and Naomi (née Croswell) Dana (1670–1751). The Dana family was prominent in colonial Massachusetts and their family's coat of arms was three stags separated by a chevron, with a fox at the crest.

He graduated from Harvard College in 1718 and then studied law and passed the bar.

== Career ==
Dana became a prominent lawyer and during the early stages of the Revolution, the city of Boston depended on his legal advice, serving as a member of the committee that investigated the Boston Massacre in 1770. He was a founding member the Sons of Liberty, and led Massachusetts opposition to the Stamp Act. He served one term in the Massachusetts Assembly, representing Marblehead in 1738.

== Personal life ==
On May 31, 1737, Dana was married to Lydia Trowbridge (1710–1776), the sister of Edmund Trowbridge, an associate justice for the Massachusetts Superior Court of Judicature. Together, they were the parents of:

- Edmund Dana (1739-1823)
- Henry Dana (b. 1741)
- Francis Dana (1743–1811), a delegate to the Continental Congress who signed the Articles of Confederation and later served as Ambassador to Russia.
- Mary Dana (b. 1744)
- Robert Dana (b. 1747)
- Mary Dana (b. 1750)
- Lydia Trowbridge Dana (1755–1808), who married John Hastings (1754-1839), a major in Lee's Continental Regiment during the Revolutionary War

Dana died on May 17, 1772. He is buried in Harvard Square, in "the Old Burying Ground" between the First Parish Church and Christ Church.

=== Descendants ===
Through his son Francis, he was the grandfather of Richard Henry Dana Sr., a lawyer, poet and literary critic, and the great-grandfather of Edmund Trowbridge Dana (1818–1869) and Richard Henry Dana Jr. (1815–1882), also a noted lawyer and author who served as U.S. Attorney for Massachusetts and wrote the classic Two Years Before the Mast.

Through his daughter Lydia Dana, he was the third-great grandfather of William Hamilton Gibson, noted naturalist and author.
