= James Dana (clergyman) =

American Protestant clergyman and pastor

Personal life
- Born: 11 May 1735 Cambridge, Province of Massachusetts
- Died: 18 August 1812 (aged 77)
- Children: Samuel Whittlesey Dana
- Education: Harvard University
- Known for: pastor of the first church in New Haven, Connecticut
- Occupation: clergyman

Religious life
- Church: Protestant

James Dana (11 May 1735 – 18 August 1812) was a Protestant clergyman and pastor of the first church in New Haven, Connecticut.

== Early life ==
Dana was born in Cambridge, Province of Massachusetts. He was a nephew of Richard, and descendant through Caleb, second son of Daniel, who was the youngest son of Richard Dana, he was graduated from Harvard University in 1753, and remained in the college as a resident graduate for several years, studying theology and general literature.

== Clergy ==
In October 1758, he was ordained and made pastor of the Congregational church in Wallingford, Connecticut, succeeding the Rev. Samuel Whittlesey. After he had accepted this call, the consociation prohibited his ordination; but the church and society, together with Mr. Dana, persisted in their action. Subsequently, the consociation pronounced a sentence of non-communion against them, and declared the ministers and delegates of the ordaining council to be "disorderly persons, and not fit to sit. in any of our ecclesiastical councils until they shall clear up their conduct to the satisfaction of the consociation of New Haven county". The controversy was essentially between the Old and New Light parties. Mr. Dana was regarded as a partisan of the liberal school of Boston, and the ministers forming the consociation of New Haven were little disposed to have one of their prominent churches committed to the care of a pastor whom they considered as having departed so far from their own standard of Christian doctrine. Mr. Dana and the ordaining clergy then formed an association by themselves, which continued until about 1772, when the controversy was terminated by pacific overtures made by the ministers then constituting the consociation. It is evident that the ordination was a departure from the Saybrook Platform, because the ordaining council was not limited to the consociation. It was tantamount to an assertion of independence of the church, in disregard of the platform. The members of the council were regarded as inclining to Arminianism. However, the prejudice against Mr. Dana gradually disappeared, and he made himself very popular by the decided stand that he took in favor of the American cause in the events that led to the American Revolution. His patriotic sermons, delivered in New Haven while the legislature was in session, were effective in winning many to his support.

In 1789 he became pastor of the first church in New Haven, and was installed on 29 April. Here he came into controversy with Jonathan Edwards and Samuel Austin; but, for the most part, his ministry was peaceful, though not eminently successful. He was succeeded in this pastorate by the Rev. Moses Stuart in 1805, but his relation was severed only by an ecclesiastical council. This procedure deeply wounded Dr. Dana, and thereafter he worshiped in the college chapel, although subsequent to Mr. Stuart's departure he again appeared in his old church and officiated as moderator at the installation of Dr. N. W. Taylor in April, 1812. The University of Edinburgh conferred on him the degree of D. D. in 1768. He published, besides memorial and other sermons, "Examination of Edwards on the Will", anonymous (Boston, 1770), and "An Examination of the Same Continued" (New Haven, 1773).

== Family ==
His son, Samuel Whittlesey Dana, senator, b. in Wallingford, Conn., 13 February 1760; d. in Middletown, 21 July 1830, was graduated at Yale University in 1775, and became a distinguished lawyer. He was elected to congress as a Federalist, and, with subsequent re-elections, served from 3 January 1797, till 1 May 1810, when he was selected as U. S. senator to succeed James Hillhouse. He remained in the United States Senate until 3 March 1821, and afterward made his home in Middletown, where for many years he was mayor.
