= Philippe Dana =

French journalist, producer, radio and television host

Philippe Dana (born 5 September 1959) is a French journalist, producer, radio and television host.

== Radio career ==
Philippe Dana presented several radio, first on radio stations in the early 1980s, then in 1988 Europe 1, and on France Inter from 1989 to 1996.

== TV career ==
In October 1984, he joined Canal+. From 1986 he was the presenter of the show cartoons Ça cartoon on this channel. From 1990 to 1992, he was the voice-over of Les Nuls L'émission, and that of Kad and Olivier's sketches, including Kamoulox. From 1992 he was the voice-over of the closing ceremonies of the Cannes Film Festival and the César Awards, broadcast on Canal+.

From 1998 to 2001, he was Alain de Greef's assistant to management programs on Canal+. In 1998, he was one of the speakers of the documentary directed by Pierre Carles Pas vu pas pris, devoted to media and more particularly to the internal operations of Canal+.

Philippe Dana also presented I>Cinema, a magazine dedicated to cinema, on i>Télé. In February 2009, he left the Canal+ Group and created a production company.
