= Stephen Winchester Dana =

American clergyman

- Born: Stephen Winchester Dana; November 17, 1840; Canaan, New York
- Died: June 8, 1910 (aged 69); Philadelphia, Pennsylvania

Stephen Winchester Dana (November 17, 1840 – June 8, 1910) was an American clergyman.

== Biography ==
Dana was born in Canaan, New York. He was the son of a Congregational clergyman Rev. John Jay Dana. He was educated at high school in Adams, Massachusetts and at the Claverack College. He graduated from Williams College in 1861, taught in Hinsdale, Massachusetts, for two years, and then studied theology in the Union Theological Seminary, New York City, where he was graduated in 1866. He was pastor of a Presbyterian church in Belvidere, New Jersey, from November, 1866, till July, 1868, when he was called to the Walnut Street Church in West Philadelphia, which grew steadily under his pastoral care and earnest preaching.

Dana died suddenly in Philadelphia, aged 69.

== Works ==
He published sermons and religious tracts.
