= John Dana =

John Dana may refer to:

- John W. Dana (1808–1867), American politician from Maine
- John Cotton Dana (1856–1929), American librarian and museum director
