= Edmund Trowbridge =

American judge and lawyer (1709–1793)

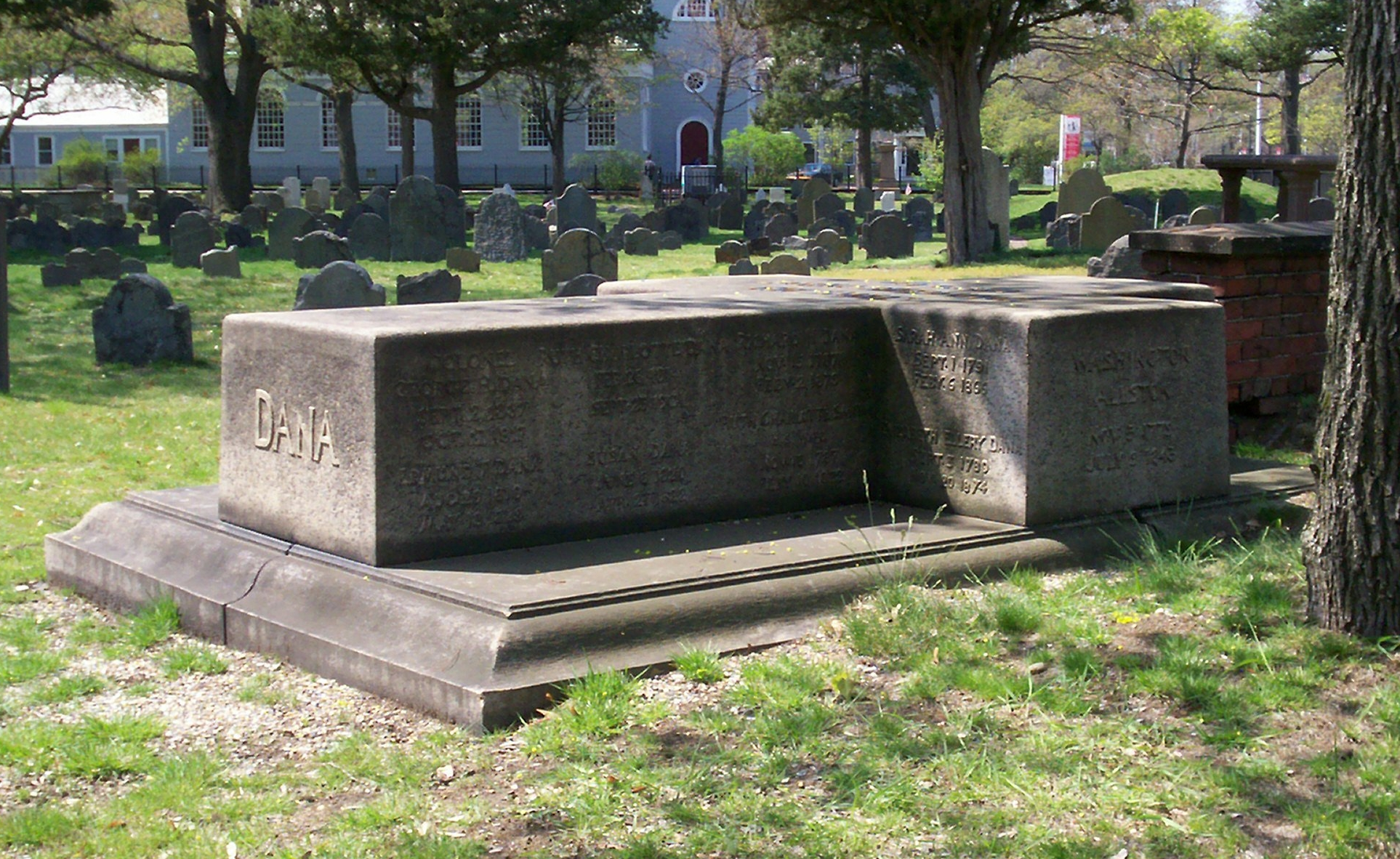
Buried in Dana family plot in Old Burying Ground, Cambridge, Ma.

Edmund Trowbridge (1709 – April 2, 1793) was an American judge and lawyer. He is best known for being an associate justice for the Massachusetts Superior Court of Judicature, the highest court in the Province of Massachusetts Bay, during the Boston Massacre.

== Early life and education ==
Edmund Trowbridge was born in Cambridge, Massachusetts to Thomas Trowbridge and Mary Goff. His great-grandfather, also named Thomas Trowbridge, migrated from England to Massachusetts during the Puritan migration to New England.

Trowbridge graduated from Harvard College in 1728 and married Martha Remington, a daughter of Judge Jonathan Remington (1677-1745) in 1738.

== Career ==
In 1742, he was recorded as owning an enslaved man named York. Seven years later in 1749, Trowbridge became attorney general for the Province of Massachusetts Bay. However, in 1767 Trowbridge was removed in favor of someone who was more opposed to British colonial policies. In that same year, he was recorded as owning two slaves: an enslaved woman named Violet and her mother.

He was not out of a job for long, as he was appointed Associate Justice for the colony's supreme judicial court within the year. In 1770, he was one of the presiding judges for the trials of the soldiers and civilians involved in the Boston Massacre. Trowbridge retired to private life two years after this trial.

He died in 1793 in Cambridge, Massachusetts. A street in Cambridge is named after him. His nephew, judge Edmund Trowbridge Dana, was also named after him. Both were buried at Old Burying Ground, Cambridge, Ma.

Legal offices
Preceded by John Overing	Massachusetts Attorney General; 1749–1767	Succeeded by Jeremiah Gridley
