= Asahel Hooker Lewis =

American politician (1810–1862)

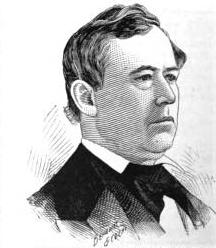
Asahel Hooker Lewis

Asahel Hooker Lewis (September 11, 1810 – September 25, 1862) was an American newspaper editor and politician.

He was the youngest son of Elias and Urania (Hooker) Lewis, of Farmington, Connecticut and was born in that town, September 11, 1810.

He graduated from Yale College in 1833 and was a member of Skull and Bones. After studying law with Hon. W. L. Stores in Middletown, Connecticut, he removed to Cleveland, Ohio, in 1835, where he was for several years editor of the Cleveland Herald. He afterward resided in Ravenna, Ohio and had charge of the Ohio Star.

In 1847 and 1848 he represented the counties of Summit and Portage in the Ohio State Legislature—and in 1848 removed to Cincinnati, where he remained eight years, and was associated with Hon. Henry Starr in the practice of Law. Then he removed to Akron, Ohio, and took the editorship of the Beacon, which he retained for a number of years. In the autumn of 1861 he went to St. Louis, and became one of the editors of the Missouri Democrat. His strength was unequal to his arduous labors, and he fell a victim to disease. He died in St. Louis, Mo, September 25, 1862, aged 52 years.

He was married in 1843 to Miss Jennette, daughter of Christian Keene of Ravenna, and after her death, in 1848, to Miss Jane Platt. He left a son and two daughters.
