= Jedediah Foster =

American judge

Jedediah Foster (October 10, 1726—October 17, 1779) was a judge and advocate for independence during the American Revolution, and ultimately a justice of the Massachusetts Supreme Judicial Court.

Foster was born in Andover, Massachusetts and studied law at Harvard University. He graduated in 1744 at the age of 18. He subsequently settled in Brookfield (now West Brookfield). He served in the First Provincial Congress of Massachusetts and as a colonel in the American Revolution. He was later appointed a judge for Worcester County, Massachusetts. He was one of four judges to oversee the trial and subsequent execution of Bathsheba Spooner, who was the first woman to be executed in the United States by Americans rather than the British. Foster was part of a committee of three which was appointed to draft the first Constitution of Massachusetts. However, Foster died before the work was completed in 1779. The site of his home, known as Jedediah Foster Homesite is listed on the National Register of Historic Places. It is now a small park.
