= Charles Loomis Dana =

American neurologist (1852–1935)

Charles Loomis Dana (March 25, 1852 – December 12, 1935) was an American physician, professor of nervous and mental disease at Cornell Medical College.

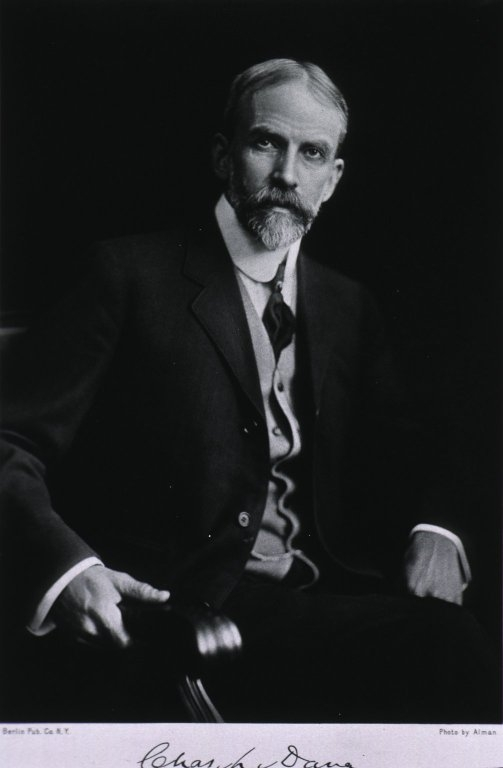
Charles Loomis Dana, M.D.

== Early and personal life ==
Dana was born in Woodstock, Vermont.

He was a descendant of Richard Dana (1617-1690).

His paternal grandparents were Charles Dana (b. 1781 in Danbury, Connecticut) and Mary Swan Dana. They married in 1808 in Northfield, Vermont. The Charles Dana house, built 1807 in Woodstock, Vermont, is now designated as a historic building.

His parents were Charles Dana Jr. (b. 1813 in Woodstock, Vermont) and Charitie Scott Loomis. They had five boys: Charles Loomis, John Cotton, Joseph L., Harold, and Edward.

In 1882, after he had completed his medical degrees and internship, Charles Loomis Dana married Lilian Gray Farlee. She died in 1894.

Their daughter, Marjorie Farlee Dana, was born in 1884. In 1916, Marjorie married William Tait Barlow. The Barlows had a daughter, Margaret Elizabeth ("Betty").

== Education ==
He attended Dartmouth College, a Phi Beta Kappa member, and graduated in 1872. In 1875, he earned a Masters of Arts and a law degree (LLD) from Dartmouth in 1905. He was interested in medicine and studied briefly with Dr. Boynton in Woodstock. He moved to Washington, DC to serve as a secretary for several years to the U.S. Senator from Vermont. In 1875, he became a private secretary to Spencer Baird, curator then Secretary of the Smithsonian Institution. While in Washington, he attended the medical schools at Georgetown University and Columbian College, and earned his medical degree in 1877. He earned a second medical degree in 1878 from the College of Physicians and Surgeons in New York.

== Medical work ==
He interned for two years at Bellevue Hospital in New York under Drs. Austin Flint and Edward G. Janeway. He then opened his medical practice. To supplement his income, he saw patients at the local Marine Hospital from 1879 to 1888. Between 1880 and 1887, he was professor of physiology at the Women's Medical College (which closed in 1918 and became the New York Medical College). He published his medical lectures and edited the weekly publication, Medical Record, with Dr. Smith Ely Jelliffe. In 1886, he became a Fellow of the New York Academy of Medicine, serving as president, 1905-1906 and 1914-1916; chair of its Public Health Committee, 1911-1928; and a trustee, 1906-1934.

Dana became interested in neurology through his associations with Drs. Edward Seguin, William Hammond, and George Beard. He joined the New York State Neurological Society in 1881 and the American Neurological Association in 1882, serving as president in 1892. He held the post of professor of diseases of the nervous system and mind at the New York Post-Graduate Medical School and Hospital from 1884 to 1895. He served on the board of trustees of the Neurological Institute of New York. From 1902 until his retirement in 1934, he was a professor of nervous diseases at Cornell Medical College.

Dana published over 250 articles. His Text-book of Nervous Diseases for the Use of Students and Practitioners of Medicine, first published in 1892, went through ten editions until 1925. His publications attempted to apply new ideas and experimental results from general pathology to neurology, and medical topics included the study of medical psychology, eugenics, and public health.

He retired in 1933.

== Other academic work ==
He belonged to many social and literary groups including the Sons of the American Revolution, the Society of Colonial Wars, and the Century Association. He was a founder and member of the Charaka Club in New York (1893-1947), where prominent physicians gathered to discuss literary and historical topics.

In 1927, Dana was invited to deliver the John Hughlings Jackson annual lecture at the University of Edinburgh, and was awarded an honorary LLD.

He opposed the Eighteenth Amendment that prohibited alcohol and instead recommended personal moderation in alcohol consumption.

== Death ==
He spent the last year of his life at Dr. Robert Brockway Lamb's private sanatorium, Crichton House, at Harmon-on-Hudson, New York, a place that focused on "nervous and mental disease." On December 12, 1935, he suffered a fatal cerebral hemorrhage while out for a walk. He was buried at Woodlawn Cemetery.

== Works ==
Dana, Charles L. A Clinical Study of Neuralgias, and of the Origin of Reflex or Transferred Pains. [New York?: s.n., 1887?]

Dana, Charles L. “On a New Type of Neurasthenic Disorder – Angio – Paralytic or ‘Pulsating’ Neurasthenia,” JAMA XXIV(4) (Jan. 26, 1895): 110-112.

Dana, Charles L. “Giants and Gigantism,” Scribner’s Magazine 17(2) (Feb. 1895): 179-186.

Dana, Charles L. Inebriety: A Study of its Causes, Duration, Prophylaxis, and Management. New York: Wynkoop Hallenbeck Crawford Co., [1901].

Dana, Charles L. Hysteria and Organic Disease: A Study of the Diagnostic Symptoms with Reports of Cases. New York: William Wood and Co., 1902.

Dana, Charles L. Eye-strain and the Psychoses. [New York: s.n., 1904?]

Dana, Charles L. The Cerebellar Seizure (Cerebellar Fits): A Syndrome Characteristic of Cerebellar Tumors. [New York]: A.R. Elliott Publ. Co., 1905.

Dana, Charles L. Academies of Medicine. [New York]: A.R. Elliott Publ. Co., 1907.

Dana, Charles L. Text-book of Nervous Diseases for the Use of Students and Practitioners of Medicine. New York: W. Wood, 1915. https://archive.org/details/textbookofnervou1915dana

Dana, Charles L. Somatic Causes of Psychoneuroses. Chicago: American Medical Association, 1920.

Dana, Charles L. The Peaks of Medical History: An Outline of the Evolution of Medicine for the Use of Medical Students & Practitioners. New York: P.B. Hoeber, Inc., 1926.

Dana, Charles L. “Early Neurology in the United States: The Hughlings Jackson Address,” JAMA 90(18) (May 5, 1928): 1421-1424.

Dana, Charles L. Poetry and the Doctors. A Catalogue of Poetical Works written by Physicians with Biographical Notes & An Essay on the Poetry of Certain Ancient Practitioners of Medicine, Illustrated with Translations from the Latin and by Reproductions of the Title Pages of the Rarer Works. Woodstock, VT: The Elm Tree Press, 1916.
