= Asahel Perry =

American politician

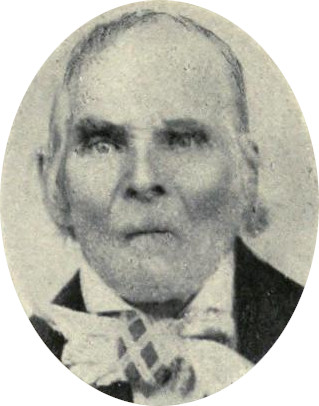
- Born: February 26, 1784; Williamsburg, Massachusetts
- Died: February 16, 1869 (aged 84); Springville, Utah
- Known for: Early settler of Springville, member of the Utah territorial legislature

Asahel Perry (February 26, 1784 – February 16, 1869) was a politician and community leader in Utah Territory.

Perry was born in Williamsburg, Massachusetts. He converted to Church of Jesus Christ of Latter Day Saints at some point in the 1830s and served a mission for the church in New York in 1840. He came to Utah Territory in 1850 and was the branch president of Springville for a year starting at its founding. Perry was also one of the original members of the Utah Territorial Council, roughly equivalent to a state senate.
