= Charles R. Dana =

American politician (1802–1868)

Charles Root Dana (November 8, 1802 – August 7, 1868) was an American Mormon leader, pioneer, and missionary, and a politician in territorial Utah.

== Biography ==
Dana was born in Schenectady, New York. Around 1825 he married Margaret Kennedy Luck, a widow, and adopted her daughter Elizabeth. The couple would have six more children.

Dana converted to Mormonism in 1838. In 1840 he was serving as a missionary in Boonville, New York for the Church of Jesus Christ of Latter Day Saints (LDS Church). In 1842–43 he was a missionary in Pittsburgh, Pennsylvania.

Dana was involved in bringing a suit before Joseph Smith in his function as judge of the municipal court at Nauvoo, Illinois. He was a friend of Smith's and wrote of an experience where Smith healed Dana's wife when she was seriously ill.

As a mason by trade, Dana helped complete the Nauvoo Temple in 1844 after Joseph Smith's death. In the completed temple Dana married two additional wives in 1846, Emily Waterman and Susan Sue Thomas, according to the Mormon practice of polygamy. He was not sealed for eternity to Susan, as she was a widow with two sons of her own.

In 1847, when the Mormons left Nauvoo, many migrating west to Utah under Brigham Young, Dana left Mount Pisgah, Iowa on a mission to the eastern United States to solicit funds for the emigration. Though slow in progress, Dana appealed to his listeners’ humanity by emphasizing the Mormon suffering and made political connections with Thomas L. Kane in Philadelphia and Duff Green in Washington, D.C.. Green gave Dana access to community groups and national leaders, and many made personal donations, including President James K. Polk, James Buchanan, and Dolley Madison. In 1848 Dana returned to Washington on another fund-raising mission, but argued more in defense of Mormon doctrine and received much less charity.

=== Life in Utah ===
In 1849 Dana immigrated to Utah Territory, but his first wife Margaret died on the plains during 1850. He settled in Ogden, where he took another wife, Harriet Elizabeth Gibson.

Dana became a community leader. He served on the First and Second Territorial Legislatures, serving 1851 through 1853, representing Weber County. He was also one of the original members of the Ogden City Council when it was organized in 1852. His son Joseph would also serve on the Ogden City Council in the early 20th century. Dana was also a leader in the LDS Church. He served as a counselor in the Weber Stake presidency when it was first formed in 1851.

In 1853 Dana went on an LDS mission to England, where he was made Pastor over conferences in Bedfordshire, Cambridgeshire, and Norwich. He would never see his wife Harriet again. Some report that during his mission she left him and their two children for another man, divorcing Dana and burning his journals. Their daughter Margaret Elizabeth reported that her mother had gone to visit family in Michigan and began the trip home to Ogden but was never heard from again, possibly killed by Indians. In 1857 Dana returned from his mission as one of the leaders taking Mormon immigrants from Liverpool to Boston.

Before coming back to Utah, Dana had sent home two sisters, Elizabeth and Jane Culley, and he returned with two more, Ann Barlow (1835–1895) and Mary Ann Cato. Having been married four times before, Dana was married to these four new women on September 14, 1857 by Brigham Young. During the Utah War Dana moved with his family to Fillmore, Utah until the conflict ended. Back in Ogden, the growing family moved into a house in town and a farm outside of town.

Before Dana died at the age of 66, he was President of a Council of Seventies.
