= Henry Wadsworth Longfellow Dana =

American academic and activist (1881–1950)

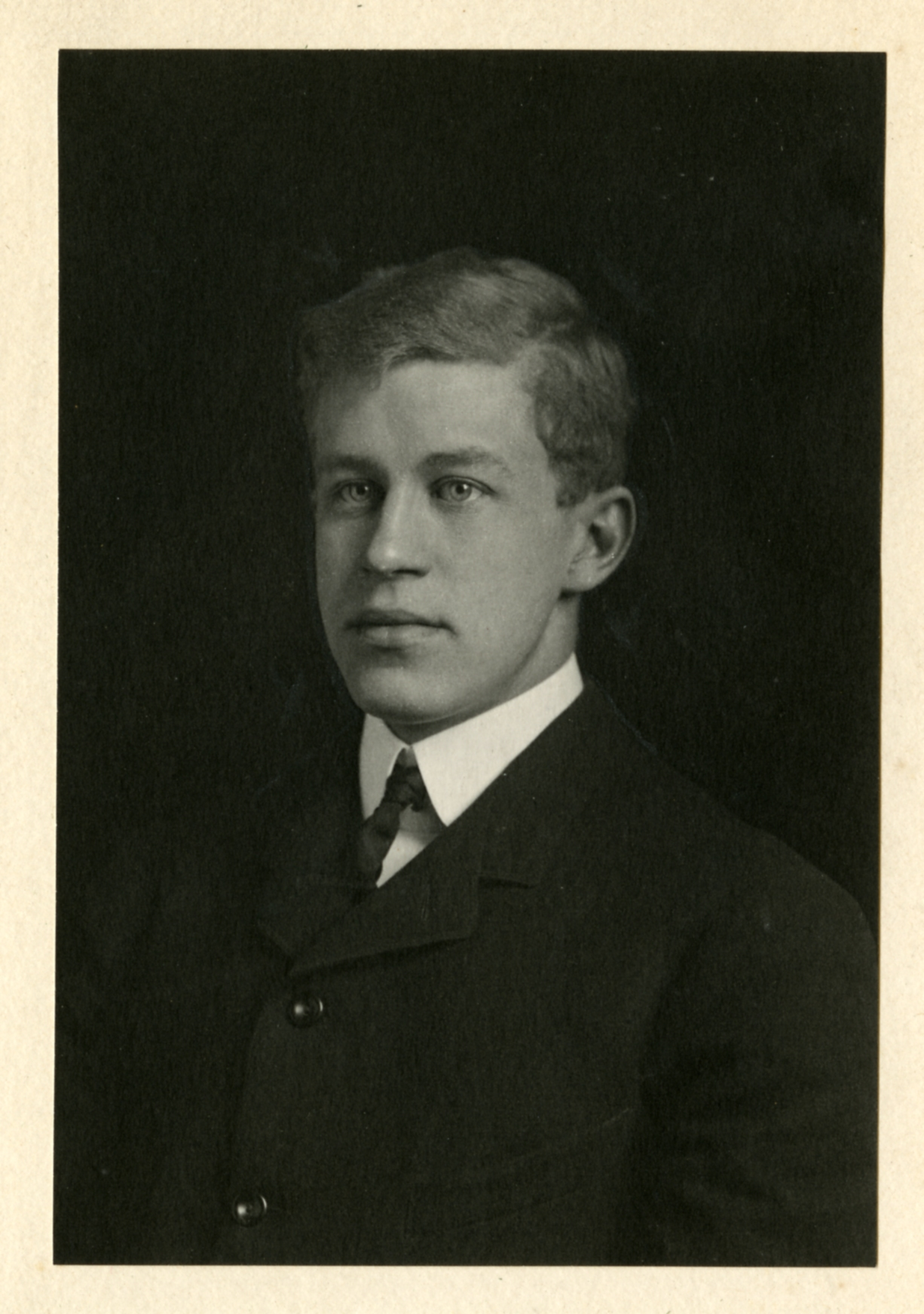
- Harry Dana circa 1900
- Born: January 26, 1881; Boston, Massachusetts, US
- Died: April 26, 1950 (aged 69); Cambridge, Massachusetts, US
- Burial place: Mount Auburn Cemetery
- Other name: Harry Dana
- Education: Harvard University (AB, AM, PhD)
- Occupations: Academic, activist
- Organization: Longfellow House
- Father: Richard Henry Dana III
- Relatives: Henry Wadsworth Longfellow (maternal grandfather); Richard Henry Dana Jr. (paternal grandfather)

Henry Wadsworth Longfellow Dana (January 26, 1881 – April 26, 1950) was an American academic, activist, caretaker of the historic Longfellow House, and grandson of writers Henry Wadsworth Longfellow and Richard Henry Dana Jr. He was a professor of literature, scholar of Soviet drama, socialist, and pacifist. Columbia University fired him in 1917 for opposing US participation in World War I. He was more or less openly gay, a fact that is generally accepted among historians and biographers.

== Early life and education ==
Dana was born on January 26, 1881, in Boston, Massachusetts. His parents were Edith Longfellow and civil service reformer Richard Henry Dana III. His grandfathers were the renowned poet Henry Wadsworth Longfellow and the attorney Richard Henry Dana Jr., a champion of progressive causes and author of the classic seafaring memoir Two Years Before the Mast. A Boston Brahmin, Dana was the second of six children. Specializing in English and comparative literature, he received his A.B. magna cum laude in 1903, his A.M. in 1904, and his Ph.D. in 1910, all from Harvard University.

== Career ==
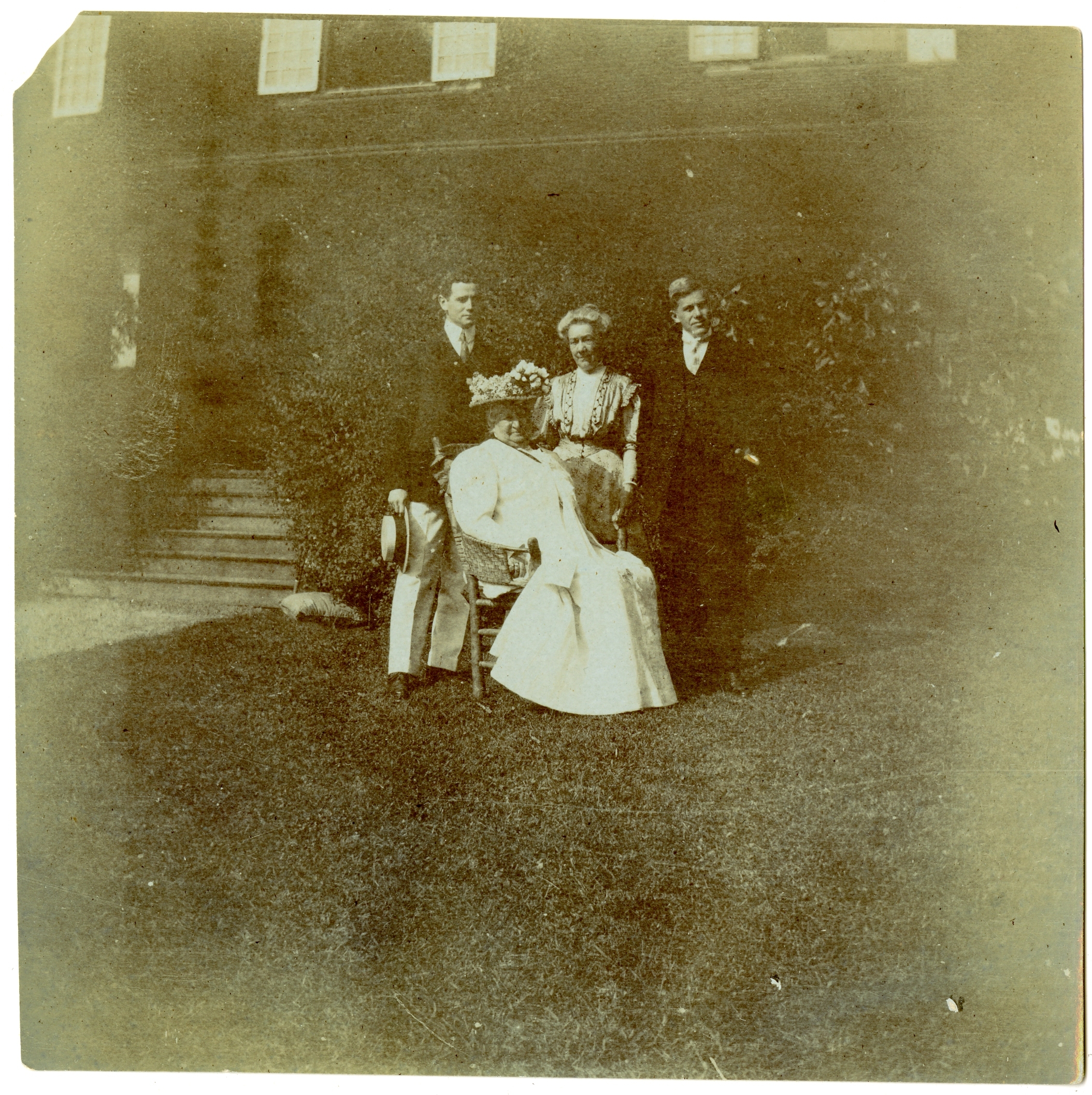
Henry Wadsworth Longfellow Dana (right) with Alice Longfellow (seated at center), circa 1905

Pursuing a career in education, Dana taught at St. Paul's School in Concord, New Hampshire, from 1903 to 1904 and at The Thacher School in Ojai, California, from 1904 to 1906. While completing his doctorate, he was an assistant instructor of comparative literature at Harvard from 1908 to 1910. He was a Lecteur d'Anglais at the Sorbonne from 1910 to 1912. That year, he took up a faculty appointment as instructor of comparative literature at Columbia University in New York City. A pacifist and antiwar activist during World War I, Dana put up bail for three Columbia students charged with "conspiracy to dissuade men from registering" for the military draft. In October 1917, Columbia University fired him, along with psychology professor James McKeen Cattell, for opposing US participation in World War I. Dana went on to serve as part-time lecturer at the New School for Social Research in New York from 1921 to 1932. He also taught drama at the Harvard-affiliated Cambridge School of Drama from 1930 to 1932.

After his firing from Columbia, Dana moved in with his aunt, Alice Mary Longfellow. Both of them received a life tenancy in the historic Longfellow House in Cambridge, Massachusetts. From 1917 until his death, Dana hosted public tours of the house, collected and organized his grandfather's papers, and aided in the transformation of the house into a public museum and archive overseen by the Longfellow House Trust and ultimately owned by the National Park Service. During the 33 years in which he called the Longfellow House home, he hosted frequent parties and gatherings of Harvard professors and students and was active in socialist and pacifist circles. Dana was a member of the Cambridge Historical Society and the Harvard Faculty Club of Cambridge, and he was involved with the American Friends Service Committee, the Massachusetts Civil Liberties Union, the People's Council of America, and other social justice and civil liberties organizations.

An ardent socialist, Dana was a scholar of Russian and Soviet drama and helped found the Boston Trade Union College in 1919. He lived in the Soviet Union in 1927, 1928, 1931, 1932, 1934, and 1935. He authored books and essays on a range of topics, including "The Six Centuries since Dante" (1926), "Opinions and Attitudes in the Twentieth Century: Shaw in Moscow" (1934), "The Theatre in a Changing Europe: Development of Soviet Drama" (1937), Handbook on Soviet Drama (1938), "The Craigie House: The Coming of Longfellow" (1939), The Dana Saga (1941), "Longfellow and Dickens: The Story of a Trans-Atlantic Friendship" (1943), "Drama in Wartime Russia" (1943), and "History of the Modern Drama: Russia" (1947). He edited Seven Soviet Plays (1946) and Two Years Before the Mast (1946) and wrote for New Masses, Soviet Russia Today, and Proceedings of the Cambridge Historical Society.

== Personal life ==
Dana was more or less openly gay, a fact generally accepted among historians and biographers. His social and amorous life is well-documented, as he kept up an extensive correspondence with many of his lovers and preserved many of these letters. Among others, they record casual relationships with nearly a dozen young men he met at Grand Central Station during the 1920s. Notably, he had a 20-year-long intimate relationship with C. Glenn Carrington (1904–1975), a Black photographer, academic, and social worker.

In 1935, Dana was charged with "committing an unnatural act" on the accusation of a 16-year-old boy, whom police had arrested in Concord, Massachusetts, on charges of stealing the car of Dana's nephew, Allston Dana, which had been parked at the Longfellow House. Dana pleaded not guilty, waived his right to a jury trial, and won an acquittal from Judge Nelson P. Brown. In the aftermath of the scandal, Dana had to travel for a year before the trustees of the Longfellow House Trust allowed him to return home full-time.

Dana died of a heart attack at the Longfellow House on April 26, 1950. He was interred at Mount Auburn Cemetery in Cambridge.
