= Samuel Luther Dana =

American chemist

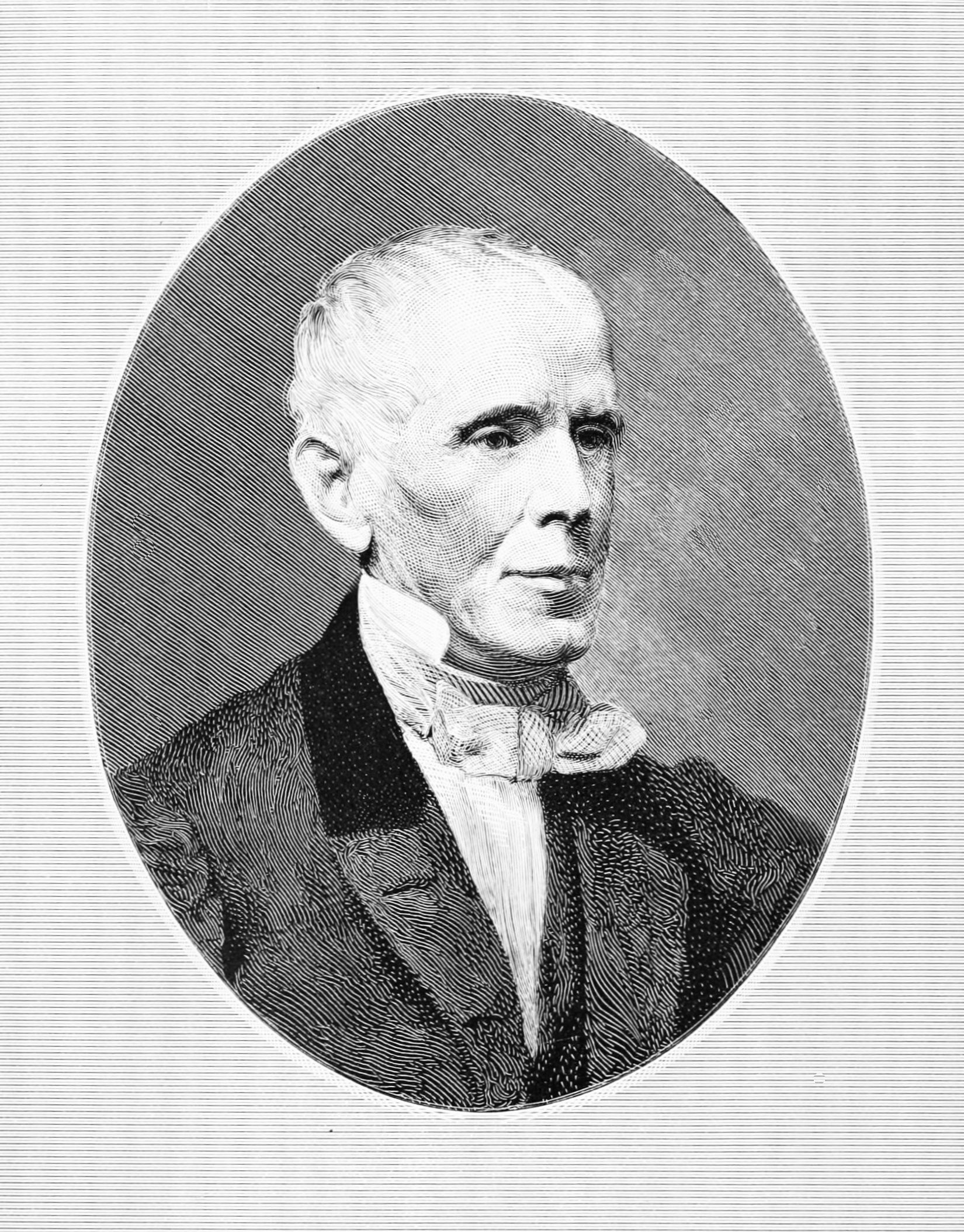
- Born: July 11, 1795; Amherst
- Died: March 11, 1868 (aged 72)
- Alma mater: Harvard Medical School; Harvard University
- Occupation: Chemist

Samuel Luther Dana (born July 11, 1795 in Amherst, New Hampshire – March 11, 1868 in Lowell, Massachusetts) was an American chemist.

== Biography ==
He studied at Phillips Exeter Academy, and graduated from Harvard in 1813. Desirous of becoming a military engineer, he applied for an appointment to the U. S. Military Academy, but instead was commissioned a lieutenant in the 1st artillery. He served during the War of 1812 in New York and Virginia, and at its close resigned from the army. Subsequently, he studied medicine, and graduated from Harvard Medical School in 1818.

From 1819 until 1826, he practised in Waltham, Massachusetts, where he was brought into intimate relations with the early cotton manufacturers of the state, and his fondness for physical science determined him to devote his attention to chemistry as applied to the manufacture and coloring of cotton goods. About 1826, he established a laboratory in Waltham for the manufacture of sulphuric acid and bleaching-salts, which afterward was merged in the Newton Chemical Company, and he was its chemist until 1834.

In 1833 he visited Europe, and spent some time in England prosecuting chemical investigations. On his return he removed to Lowell, where he became resident and consulting chemist to the Merrimack Manufacturing Company, and continued as such until his death. His investigation in the bleaching of cotton led to the invention of the so-called "American system" of bleaching, which attracted much attention abroad when first published in 1838 in the Bulletin de la société industrielle de Mulhouse.

Many other important improvements in the printing of cottons and the chemical processes involved in that work were made by him, and gave to the goods produced in Lowell a high reputation in the United States. His researches on the action of cow manure as a mordant, showing that its fixing properties are due to the sodium phosphate that it contains, with the subsequent introduction of "substitutes", was a decided advance in the art of calico printing.

Prof. Benjamin Silliman Jr., wrote of him: "In point of time, originality, and ability, Dr. Dana stood deservedly first among scientific writers on agriculture in the United States."

== Works ==
Dana prepared for the City of Lowell a valuable report on the injurious influence of lead pipes for water used for drinking and culinary purposes. His interest in this subject led him subsequently to translate from the French a Treatise on Lead Diseases. He contributed many papers on technical topics to the North American Review and Silliman's American Journal of Science.

- 1818: (with James Freeman Dana) Outlines of the Geology and Mineralogy of Boston and its Vicinity via Google Books
- 1833: "Chemical Changes occurring in the Manufacture of Sulphuric Acid"
- 1843: An Essay on Manures via Internet Archive
- 1848: Lead Diseases: a Treatise, translated from French original written by L. Tanquerel des Planches
- 1858: Muck Manuel for Farmers, fourth edition, includes chapter on bones, superphosphates of lime and alkalies
