= Francis Dana =

American Founding Father and judge (1743–1811)

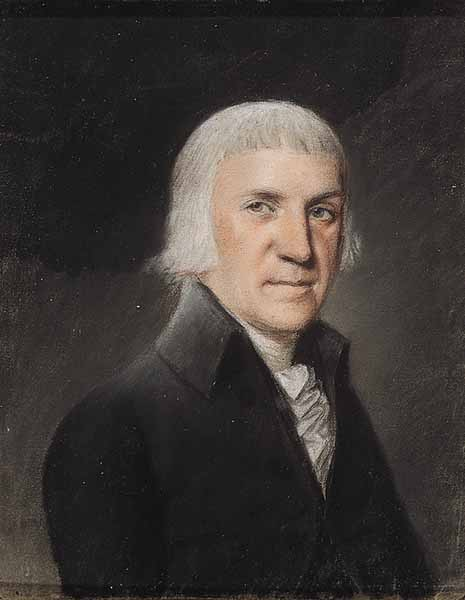
- Portrait by James Sharples, c. 1794–1796

United States Minister to Russia
- In office December 19, 1780 – September 1783
- Appointed by: Continental Congress
- Succeeded by: John Quincy Adams

Associate Justice of the Massachusetts Supreme Judicial Court
- In office 1785–1791
- Preceded by: Jedediah Foster
- Succeeded by: Thomas Dawes

Chief Justice of the Massachusetts Supreme Judicial Court
- In office 1791–1806
- Preceded by: Nathaniel Peaslee Sargent
- Succeeded by: Theophilus Parsons

Personal details
- Born: June 13, 1743 Charlestown, Massachusetts, British America
- Died: April 25, 1811 (aged 67) Cambridge, Massachusetts, U.S.
- Resting place: Old Burying Ground, Cambridge
- Education: Harvard University

Francis Dana (June 13, 1743 – April 25, 1811) was an American Founding Father, lawyer, jurist, and statesman from Massachusetts. He served as a delegate to the Continental Congress in 1777–1778 and 1784. A signer of the Articles of Confederation, he was secretary to the diplomatic mission that negotiated the end of the American Revolution, and was appointed Minister to Russia. He later served as a member of the Supreme Judicial Court of Massachusetts and served as the chief justice for 15 years.

Dana's wife Elizabeth was a daughter of Ann Remington and William Ellery, a signer of the Declaration of Independence. He was also the father-in-law of Washington Allston, a noted painter and poet.

== Biography ==
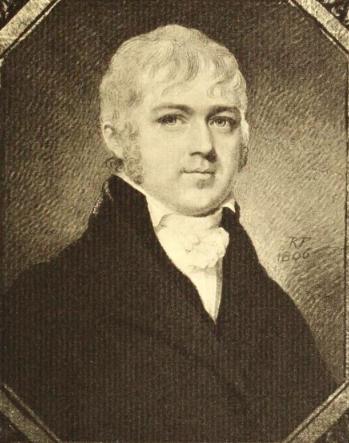
Francis Dana 4th by Robert Field

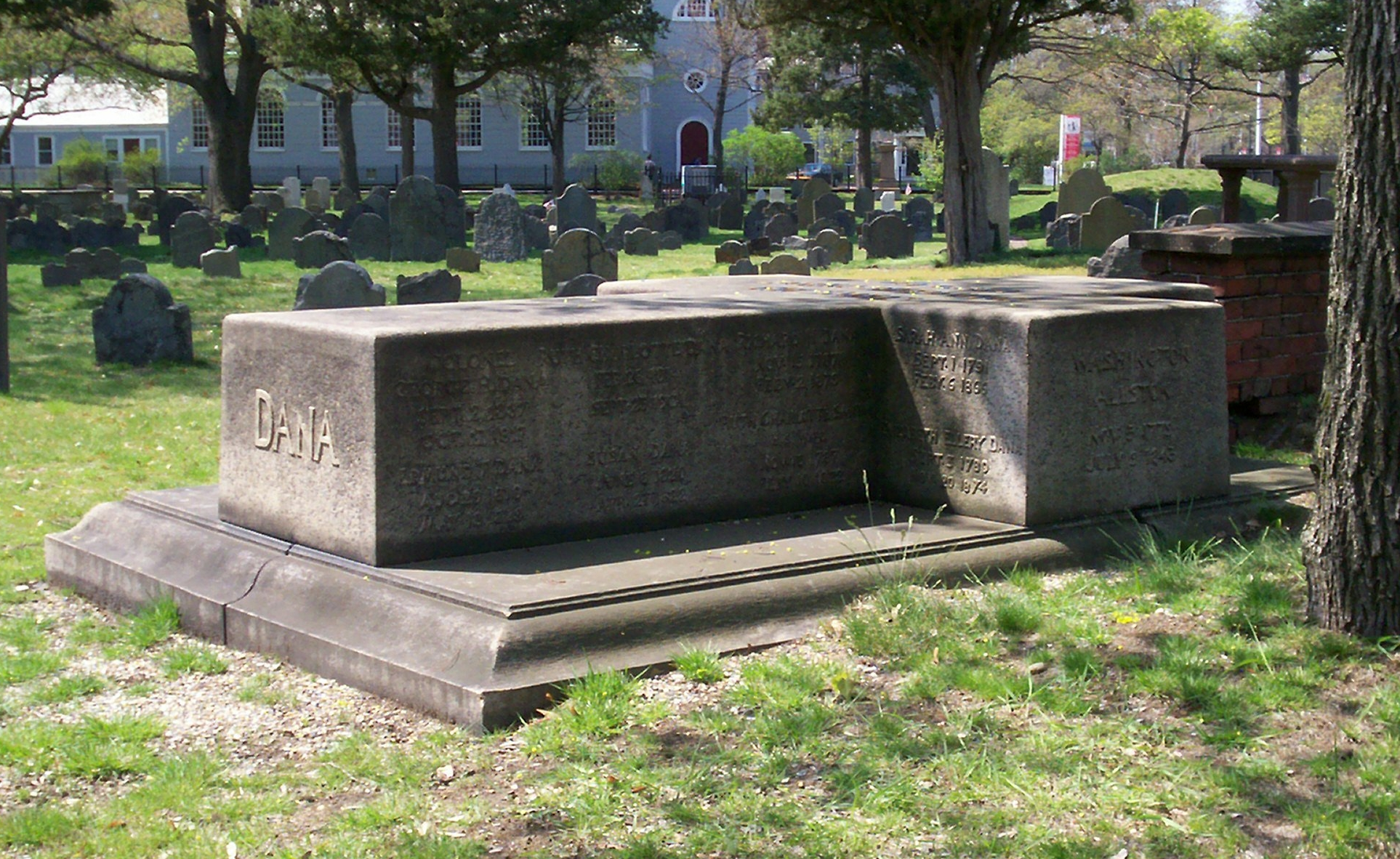
Dana family plot in Old Burying Ground, Cambridge, Massachusetts

Francis was born in Charlestown, Massachusetts, the son of lawyer Richard Dana. He was educated at Harvard where he graduated in 1762, then read law and was admitted to the bar, after which he built a successful legal practice in Boston.

Being an opponent of the British colonial policy, he became a leader of the Sons of Liberty and was first elected to Massachusetts' provincial (revolutionary) Congress in 1774. In 1775 the Continental Congress dispatched him to England in an unsuccessful attempt to reconcile the differences leading to the Revolutionary War. He returned the following year, convinced that a friendly settlement of the dispute was impossible, and was elected a delegate to the Continental Congress in 1777, where he signed the Articles of Confederation in 1778. As a member of the latter body, he became chairman in January 1778 of the committee appointed to visit General George Washington at Valley Forge and confer with him concerning the reorganization of the Continental Army. This committee spent about three months in camp and assisted Washington in preparing the plan of reorganization which Congress in the main adopted. In this year, he was also a member of a committee to consider Lord North's offer of conciliation, which he vigorously opposed.

Dana left the Congress to accompany John Adams to Paris as a secretary to the diplomatic delegation. In 1780, he was named as American minister to the Russian Empire, and while he never gained official recognition from Catherine the Great, he remained in Saint Petersburg until 1783. After his return, he was again elected to the national Congress in 1784. In 1785, Dana was appointed to the Supreme Court of Massachusetts and served there until 1806 as the chief justice after 1791. An earnest advocate of the adoption of the Federal constitution, he was a member of the state convention which ratified it in 1788 and was one of the most influential advisers of the leaders of the Federalist Party, specifically its Essex Junto.

In 1792, Dana became a stockholder in a company that was formed to build a bridge to Cambridgeport over the Charles River. This became the West Boston Bridge, later the site of the Longfellow Bridge that exists today. The bridge was opened in November 1793.

Dana generally retired from public life in 1806. He was a charter member of the American Academy of Arts and Sciences in 1780 and actively supported the growth of Harvard University. His son, Richard Henry Dana Sr., was an important poet and literary critic as well as a lawyer. His grandson, Richard Henry Dana Jr., was a noted lawyer and author who served as U.S. Attorney for Massachusetts and wrote the classic Two Years Before the Mast (1840).

== Death and legacy ==
Coat of Arms of Francis Dana

Dana died in Cambridge, Massachusetts, on April 25, 1811, and is buried in Cambridge's Old Burying Ground. The former town of Dana, Massachusetts, was named for him. The Belchertown subdivision Dana Hill is, in turn, named for the former town. Six streets in Cambridge, MA are named for Dana or his relatives: Remington St, Kinnaird St, Ellery St, Allston St, Trowbridge St, and Dana St.

== See also ==
- Martin v. Massachusetts, a landmark 1805 case presided over by Dana

== Notes ==
Legal offices
| Preceded by Jedediah Foster | Associate Justice of the Massachusetts Supreme Judicial Court; 1785–1791 | Succeeded by Thomas Dawes |
| Preceded by Nathaniel Peaslee Sargent | Chief Justice of the Massachusetts Supreme Judicial Court; 1791–1806 | Succeeded by Theophilus Parsons |
