= Samuel Dana (Massachusetts politician) =

American politician

Member of the U.S. House of Representatives from Massachusetts's 4th district
- In office September 22, 1814 – March 3, 1815
- Preceded by: William M. Richardson
- Succeeded by: Asahel Stearns

Member of the Massachusetts House of Representatives
- In office 1803, 1825-1827

Member of the Massachusetts State Senate
- In office 1805-1812, 1817

President of the Massachusetts State Senate
- In office 1811–1812
- Preceded by: Harrison Gray Otis
- Succeeded by: John Phillips
- In office 1807–1807
- Preceded by: John Bacon
- Succeeded by: Harrison Gray Otis

Personal details
- Born: June 26, 1767 Groton, Province of Massachusetts Bay, British America
- Died: November 20, 1835 (aged 68) Charlestown, Massachusetts, U.S.
- Resting place: Groton Cemetery
- Party: Republican
- Spouse: Rebecca Barrett (after 1795)
- Children: 8
- Parent(s): Samuel Dana; Anna Kenrick Dana

Samuel Dana (June 26, 1767 – November 20, 1835) was an American lawyer and politician who served in both branches of the Massachusetts General Court, as President of the Massachusetts Senate and as a United States representative from Massachusetts.

== Early life and education ==
Dana was born in Groton in the Province of Massachusetts Bay on June 26, 1767, the son of the clergyman Samuel and Anna (Kenrick) Dana. Dana attended the local public schools and later studied law in the office of United States District Court Judge John Lowell, and was then admitted to the bar in 1789.

== Career ==
Dana practiced law in Groton, Massachusetts and later in Charlestown, Massachusetts. On October 14, 1811 Dana also was appointed as the Chief Justice of the Massachusetts Court of Common Pleas, he held that position for nine years.

Dana was appointed postmaster January 1, 1801, he served as a member of the Massachusetts House of Representatives in 1803 in the State senate and served as President of the Massachusetts Senate. Dana served as attorney for Middlesex County from 1807 to 1811.

=== Member of Congress ===
Dana was elected as a Democratic-Republican to the Thirteenth Congress to fill the vacancy caused by the resignation of William M. Richardson. Dana served from September 22, 1814 to March 3, 1815. Dana was an unsuccessful candidate for reelection in 1814 to the Fourteenth Congress.

=== Later life ===
After his congressional service Dana resumed the practice law. Dana was a delegate to the Massachusetts Constitutional Convention of 1820–1821. Dana was again a member of the Massachusetts House of Representatives from 1825–1827.

== Personal life ==
On December 5, 1795, Dana was married to Rebecca Barrett of New Ipswich, New Hampshire. Together, they had eight children, including a son, James Dana.

Dana died in Charlestown, Massachusetts on November 20, 1835. Dana was buried in Groton Cemetery.

U.S. House of Representatives
Preceded by William M. Richardson	Member of the U.S. House of Representatives from Massachusetts's 4th congressional district September 22, 1814 – March 3, 1815	Succeeded by Asahel Stearns
Political offices
Preceded by John Bacon	President of the Massachusetts Senate; 1807	Succeeded by Harrison Gray Otis
Preceded by Harrison Gray Otis	President of the Massachusetts Senate; 1811–1812	Succeeded by John Phillips
