= Edmund Trowbridge Dana =

American jurist and author

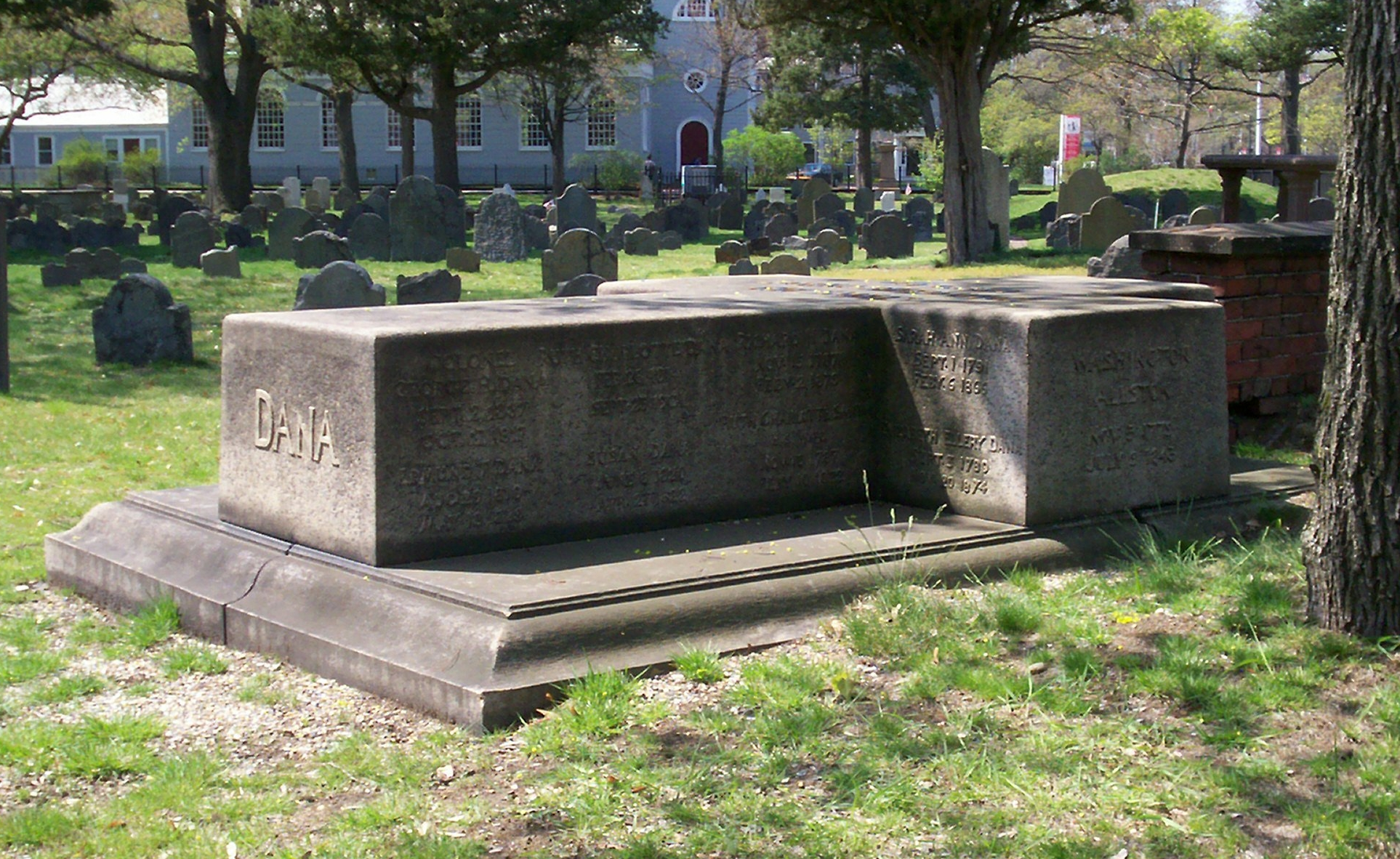
Dana family plot in Old Burying Ground, Cambridge, Massachusetts

Edmund Trowbridge Dana Jr. (29 August 1818 in Cambridge, Massachusetts – 18 May 1869 in Cambridge, Massachusetts) was an American lawyer and author.

He is not to be confused with Edmund Trowbridge Dana (1779–1859), artist, and Edmund "Ned" Trowbridge Dana III (1886–1981), grandson of Henry Wadsworth Longfellow.

== Biography ==
He was born at Cambridge to Richard H. Dana Sr. and Ruth Charlotte Smith Dana, in one of the preeminent colonial family of New England that settled in Massachusetts around 1640. He was the younger sibling of Ruth Dana, known as "Charlotte" to her family (1814-1901) and Richard Henry Dana Jr., and a nephew of Judge Edmund Trowbridge of the Supreme Court of Massachusetts.

He graduated from the University of Vermont in 1839, and at Cambridge Law School in 1841. Subsequently he practiced law in partnership with his brother, Richard Henry Dana Jr., in Boston for several years. Failing health compelled him to reside in Europe, where he continued his studies, devoting special attention to Roman civil law, and to history and philosophy in their bearings upon law.

In 1854 he received the degree of J.U.D. from the University of Heidelberg, and returned to the United States two years later. He wrote occasionally for periodicals, and attempted the translation of the works of Von Mohl, with whom he was personally acquainted, and other German jurists. His other literary work included original poetry, essays, printed lectures, and translations from Greek and Latin. During his last years, he assisted his brother in preparing the new edition of Wheaton's Elements of International Law.

His personal papers, correspondence, writings, legal and financial records are preserved in five series at Northeast Museum Services Center (NMSC), National Park Service, Charlestown, Massachusetts.
