= Samuel W. Dana =

American politician

Samuel Whittlesey Dana
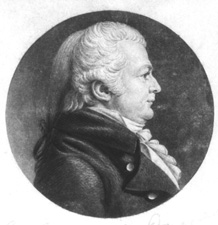
- 1806 engraving by Charles Balthazar Julien Févret de Saint-Mémin.

United States Senator from Connecticut
- In office December 4, 1810 – March 3, 1821
- Preceded by: James Hillhouse
- Succeeded by: Elijah Boardman

Member of the U.S. House of Representatives from Connecticut's At-Large district
- In office January 3, 1797 – May 10, 1810
- Preceded by: Uriah Tracy
- Succeeded by: Ebenezer Huntington

Member of the Connecticut General Assembly
- In office 1789–1796

Personal details
- Born: February 13, 1760 Wallingford, Connecticut Colony, British America
- Died: July 21, 1830 (aged 70) Middletown, Connecticut, U.S.
- Party: Federalist

Samuel Whittlesey Dana (February 13, 1760 – July 21, 1830) was an American lawyer and politician from Middletown, Connecticut. He represented Connecticut in both the U.S. House of Representatives and Senate.

== Biography ==
Born in Wallingford in the Connecticut Colony, Dana matriculated at Yale College in 1771 at the age of 11 and graduated in 1775 at the age of 15. He studied law, was admitted to the bar in 1778, and practiced in Middletown, Connecticut.

== Family ==
His father was the clergyman James Dana (1735–1812), who was a nephew of Richard Dana (1699–1772), a lawyer. Richard Dana was, in turn, a descendant through Caleb, the second son of Daniel, who was the youngest son of Richard Dana. The latter Richard Dana came from England, settled in Cambridge in 1640, and died there around 1695. According to family tradition, this Richard Dana was the son of a French Huguenot who settled in England in 1629.

On July 13, 1821, Dana married Mary (or Maria) Pomeroy Alsop, the widow of the poet Richard Alsop. Maria was the daughter of Eleazer Wheelock Pomeroy and Mary Wyllys. Her brother, Samuel Wyllys Pomeroy, was the founder of the town of Pomeroy, Ohio, which was developed with the help of his son-in-law, Valentine Baxter Horton. Valentine Baxter Horton married Clara Alsop Pomeroy, who was a niece-by-marriage of Mr. Dana. The bimetalist Samuel Dana Horton was named after Mr. Dana, who was Valentine Baxter Horton's law tutor.

== Career ==
Dana was a member of the Connecticut General Assembly from 1789 to 1796, and unsuccessfully ran for Congress in 1793. Afterward he was elected to the United States House of Representatives to fill the vacancy caused by the resignation of Uriah Tracy, and served from January 3, 1797 to May 10, 1810. There he was chairman of the U.S. House Committee on Elections, and was one of the impeachment managers appointed by the House of Representatives in 1798 to conduct the impeachment proceedings against William Blount, a Senator from Tennessee.

Dana was elected as a Federalist in 1810 to the United States Senate to fill the vacancy caused by the resignation of James Hillhouse. He was reelected in 1814 and served from December 4, 1810, to March 3, 1821. He was one of the 13 Senators who voted against war with Britain on June 17, 1812, but 19 Senators voted for war. In 1814, Dana was elected a member of the American Antiquarian Society.

Dana was mayor of Middletown from 1822 until his death in 1830. He was also the presiding judge of the Middlesex County Court from 1825 until his death.

== Death ==
Dana died in Middletown, Middlesex County, Connecticut on July 21, 1830 (age 70 years, 158 days). He is interred at Washington Street Cemetery, Middletown.

U.S. House of Representatives
Preceded by Uriah Tracy	Member of the U.S. House of Representatives from Connecticut's at-large congressional district January 3, 1797 – May 10, 1810	Succeeded by Ebenezer Huntington
U.S. Senate
Preceded by James Hillhouse	U.S. senator (Class 1) from Connecticut; December 4, 1810 – March 3, 1821	Succeeded by Elijah Boardman
