= Samuel Dana (clergyman) =

American clergyman and lawyer

Judge of Probate for Hillsborough County
- In office 1787

Member of the New Hampshire State Senate
- In office 1793

Personal details
- Born: 14 January 1739
- Died: 1 April 1798 (aged 59)
- Children: Samuel Dana
- Education: Harvard
- Occupation: clergyman

Samuel Dana (born in Cambridge, Massachusetts [now Brighton], 14 January 1739; died in Amherst, New Hampshire, 1 April 1798) was an American clergyman, judge and politician.

== Biography ==
He graduated from Harvard in 1755, having among his classmates John Adams and Tristram Dalton. He then studied theology. In 1761 the town of Groton, Massachusetts, invited him to become their minister "with a settlement of £200, a salary of £80, and firewood not to exceed thirty cords per annum." He accepted this call, and was installed on 3 June as successor to Caleb Trowbridge.

During the troubles that preceded the Revolutionary War, believing that resistance would lead to greater evils than were then endured, he used his influence on the side of non-resistance. This course gave great offence to his parishioners, who prevented him from entering the meetinghouse, although the Whig committee of Groton published a card to the effect that Dana had fully atoned for his offences. The good will of his people had become alienated, and his dismissal soon followed. He continued to reside in Groton, where he cultivated a small farm, and in 1780 preached to a separate society.

On the death of John Bulkeley, he became executor of his will, and, moving the extensive law library to his own residence, he studied for that profession. Subsequently he was admitted to the bar and practised in Amherst, New Hampshire, where in 1787 he was made judge of probate for Hillsborough County, and in 1793 was member of the New Hampshire State Senate.

== Family ==
He was the father of Samuel Dana, the Massachusetts politician, who became a member of Congress.
