= Chauncey (name) =

Chauncey is both a given name and a surname. Notable people with the name "Chauncey" include:

== Given name ==
=== A ===
- Chauncey Abbott (1815–1872), American lawyer and politician
- Chauncey M. Abbott (1822–1863), American politician

=== B ===
- Chauncey Bailey (1949–2007), American journalist
- Chauncey Brooke Baker (1860–1936), American army officer
- Chauncey Bangs (1901–1942), Canadian skater
- Chauncey Beadle (1866–1950), Canadian botanist
- Chauncey L. Berrien (1879–1932), American football player
- Chauncey Billups (born 1976), American basketball player
- Chauncey Bishop (1882–1927), American football player
- Chauncey Forward Black (1839–1904), American politician
- Chauncey Samuel Boucher (1886–1955), American historian
- Chauncey Boughton (1805–1895), American physician and politician
- Chauncey Bowens (born 2006), American football player
- Chauncey B. Brewster (1848–1941), American bishop
- Chauncey W. Brownell (1847–1938), American attorney and politician
- Chauncey Browning Sr. (1903–1971), American judge
- Chauncey H. Browning Jr. (1934–2010), American attorney and politician
- Chauncey Bulkley (1798–1860), American lawyer
- Chauncey Burkam (1892–1964), American baseball player

=== C ===
- Chauncey G. Cady (1803–1893), American farmer and politician
- Chauncey C. Churchill (1815–1889), American civil servant
- Chauncey Fitch Cleveland (1799–1887), American politician
- Chauncey Colton (1800–1876), American educator
- Chauncey H. Cooke (1846–1919), American soldier and teacher

=== D ===
- Chauncey Davis (born 1983), American football player
- Chauncey Davis (politician) (1812–1888), American politician
- Chauncey Depew (1834–1928), American attorney and politician

=== E ===
- Chauncey Eskridge (1917–1988), American attorney

=== F ===
- Chauncey Ives Filley (1829–1923), American politician
- Chauncey Fisher (1872–1939), American baseball player
- Chauncey Forward (1793–1839), American politician
- Chauncey J. Fox (1797–1883), American politician

=== G ===
- Chauncey H. Griffith (1879–1956), American print designer
- Chauncey Golston (born 1998), American football player
- Chauncey Goodrich (1759–1815), American lawyer and politician
- Chauncey A. Goodrich (1790–1860), American clergyman
- Chauncey Wright Griggs (1832–1910), American businessman and politician

=== H ===
- Chauncey B. Hammond (1882–1952), American politician
- Chauncey Hardy (1988–2011), American basketball player
- Chauncey Hare (1934–2019), American photographer
- Chauncey Hawkins (born 1975), American rapper
- Chauncey Heath (disambiguation), multiple people
- Chauncey L. Higbee (1821–1884), American politician
- Chauncey Hollis (born 1987), American record producer
- Chauncey Marvin Holt (1921–1997), American social figure
- Chauncey Hosford (1820–1911), American pioneer
- Chauncey Howell (1935–2021), American newscaster

=== I ===
- Chauncey Ives (1810–1894), American sculptor

=== J ===
- Chauncey Jerome (1793–1868), American clockmaker

=== K ===
- Chauncey Kirby (1871–1950), Canadian ice hockey player
- Chauncey L. Knapp (1809–1898), American politician

=== L ===
- Chauncey Langdon (1763–1830), American politician
- Chauncey D. Leake (1896–1978), American pharmacologist
- Chauncey Leopardi (born 1981), American actor
- Chauncey B. Little (1877–1952), American politician
- Chauncey Loomis (1783–1817), American politician
- Chauncey C. Loomis (1930–2009), American writer

=== M ===
- Chauncey McCormick (1884–1954), American businessman
- Chauncey McPherson (1892–1977), American fencer
- Chauncey Morehouse (1902–1980), American jazz drummer

=== N ===
- Chauncey Nye (1823–1900), American pioneer

=== O ===
- Chauncey O'Toole (born 1986), Canadian rugby union footballer
- Chauncey Olcott (1858–1932), American actor
- Chauncey N. Olds (1816–1890), American politician

=== P ===
- Chauncey Parker, American attorney
- Chauncey M. Phelps (1818–1868), American politician
- Chauncey Hatch Phillips (1837–1902), American real-estate developer
- Chauncey Northrop Pond (1841–1920), American minister
- Chauncey Purple (1820–1882), American businessman

=== R ===
- Chauncey W. Reed (1890–1956), American politician
- Chauncey Rivers (born 1997), American football player
- Chauncey Rose (1794–1877), American businessman
- Chauncey Foster Ryder (1868–1949), American painter

=== S ===
- Chauncey Brewer Sabin (1824–1890), American federal judge
- Chauncey S. Sage (1816–1890), American businessman and politician
- Chauncey B. Seaton (1848–1896), American architect
- Chauncey Simpson (1901–1970), American football coach
- Chauncey Fitch Skilling (1868–1945), American architect
- Chauncey Sparks (1884–1968), American attorney and politician
- Chauncey Starr (1912–2007), American electrical engineer
- Chauncey Steele (disambiguation), multiple people
- Chauncey Hugh Stigand (1877–1919), British army officer
- Chauncey Stillman (1907–1989), American military officer
- Chauncey Guy Suits (1905–1991), American physicist

=== T ===
- Chauncey Thomas (1813–1882), American farmer and businessman
- Chauncey Thomas Jr. (1850–1919), American naval officer
- Chauncey Brewster Tinker (1876–1963), American scholar

=== V ===
- Chauncey Vibbard (1811–1891), American railroad executive
- Chauncey Milton Vought (1890–1930), American aviator

=== W ===
- Chauncey Washington (born 1985), American football player
- Chauncey B. Welton (1844–1908), American businessman and politician
- Chauncey W. West (1827–1870), American missionary
- Chauncey Westbrook (1921–2006), American guitarist
- Chauncey Pratt Williams (1860–1936), American historian
- Chauncey Wright (1830–1875), American philosopher

=== Y ===
- Chauncey Yellow Robe (1867–??), Native American educator
- Chauncey W. Yockey (1877–1936), American lawyer and politician

== Surname ==
- Charles Chauncey (disambiguation), multiple people
- Danny Chauncey (born 1956), American guitarist
- George Chauncey (born 1954), American historian and writer
- George Chauncey (executive) (1847–1926), American businessman
- Henry Chauncey (1905–2002), American educator
- Ichabod Chauncey (1635–1691), English physician and nonconformist divine
- Isaac Chauncey (1779–1840), American naval officer
- Leslie Chauncey (born 1981), American basketball player
- Nathaniel Chauncey (1881–1756), American minister and Yale patriarch
- Richard Chauncey (died 1760), English merchant
- Sam Chauncey, American university administrator

== See also ==
- Chauncy (name)
- Chauncey (disambiguation)
