= Chauncy =

Chauncy may refer to:

- Chauncy (album), by Jason Scheff, 1996
- Chauncy (name), including lists of people with the given name and surname
- Chauncy School, a secondary school in Ware, Hertfordshire, England
- Nan Chauncy Award, an Australian children's literature award

== See also ==
- Chauncey (disambiguation)
- Chauncey (name)
- Chauncy Jerome Jr Shipwreck Site, in Long Branch City, New Jersey, U.S.
- MV Chauncy Maples, motor ship and former steamship
