= Chauncey =

Chauncey may refer to:

- Chauncey (name), both a given name and a surname.

== Places in the United States ==
- Chauncey, Georgia
- Chauncey, Illinois
- Chauncey, Michigan
- Chauncey, Ohio
- Chauncey, West Virginia
- Chauncey Peak, a mountain near Meriden, Connecticut
- Chauncey Street station, of the New York City Subway
- Chauncey, a 19th-century town absorbed into West Lafayette, Indiana

== Other uses ==
- Chauncey (Wonder Showzen), a yellow puppet from the American puppet black comedy Television series Wonder Showzen
- USS Chauncey, three ships named for Commodore Chauncey

== See also ==
- Chauncy (disambiguation)
  - Chauncy (name)
- Chauncey Vibbard (steamboat)
