= Chauncy (name) =

Chauncy is both a given name and a surname. Notable people with the name include:

== Given name ==
- Chauncy Harris (1914–2003), American geographer
- Chauncy Maples (1852–95), British missionary and bishop of Nyasaland
- Chauncy Master (born 1985), Malawian runner
- Chauncy Batho Dashwood Strettell (1881–1958), English Indian Army officer
- Chauncy Townsend (1708–1770), British politician and businessman
- Chauncy Hare Townshend (1798–1868), English poet, clergyman, and collector
- Chauncy Welliver (born 1983), American-New Zealand boxer

== Surname ==
- Charles Chauncy (1592–1671), Anglo-American clergyman and educator
- Charles Chauncy (1705–1787), American Congregational clergyman
- Henry Chauncy (1632–1719), English lawyer, educator and antiquarian
- Ichabod Chauncy (1635–1691), English physician and nonconformist divine
- Isaac Chauncy (1632–1712), English dissenting minister
- Maurice Chauncy (1509–1581), English Catholic priest and Carthusian monk
- Nan Chauncy (1900–1970), British-born Australian novelist
- Philip Chauncy (1816–1880), colonial Australian surveyor, amateur ethnographer
- Robert de Chauncy (died 1278), English bishop of Carlisle
- William Snell Chauncy (1820–1878), English civil engineer

== See also ==
- Chauncy (disambiguation)
- Chauncey (disambiguation)
- Chauncey (name)
