= Order of the Founders and Patriots of America =

American hereditary association

- Formation: March 17, 1896
- Type: Patriotic-hereditary society
- Members: 896
- Governor General: J. Duncan Berry
- Deputy Governor General: Matthew Dupee
- Secretary General: Robert Stevens
- Website: ofpa.org

The Order of the Founders and Patriots of America (OFPA) is a non-profit, hereditary organization based in the United States that is dedicated to promoting patriotism and preserving historical records of the first colonists and their descendants. The Order is made up of "Associates" who trace their ancestry back to colonists who settled between May 13, 1607 to May 13, 1657, and who also have ancestors in the same male ancestral line who served in the American Revolution.

Established in 1896, the Order has relatively strict bloodline mandates that have earned it a reputation as the most exclusive lineage society in the United States. As of 2023, its membership roster consisted of fewer than 900 men.

== History ==
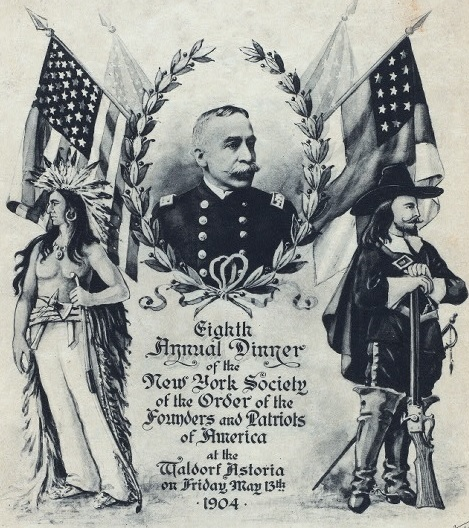
A menu cover from the 1904 General Court of the OFPA features the portrait of Admiral George Dewey, then the Order's Governor General.

=== Founding ===
The OFPA was incorporated in New York state on March 17, 1896. The first meeting at which all the Charter members gathered was on 17 April 1896 at the Hotel Normandie in New York City.

The first Governor General of the Order was Frederick Dent Grant, the first son of General and President of the United States Ulysses S. Grant and Julia Grant. The first annual banquet of the Order was held on February 2, 1897, in the Hotel Manhattan in New York City with over 200 members and guests in attendance, as reported in the New York Times.

=== Membership ===
Membership in the OFPA is open to male U.S. citizens age 18 or more of "good moral character and reputation" who are directly descended in the male line of either parent from an ancestor who settled, prior to May 13, 1657, in the territory that would become the Thirteen Colonies and one or all of whose intermediate ancestors in the same line, who lived in the period of the American Revolution from 1775 to 1783, adhered as patriots to the cause of the colonies.

=== Societies ===
The OFPA is organized into state and regional chapters known as Societies. A new society receives a Charter from the Order once it meets certain conditions and the society is responsible for collecting national dues from its members that are paid to the Order annually. Each state society is headed by a Governor and individual members in the state societies are referred to as "Associates." These societies, together, comprise the general Order which is headed by a Governor General. The Order is headquartered in Ohio.

== Activities ==
The activities of the General Order and State Societies encompass:

=== Awards Program ===
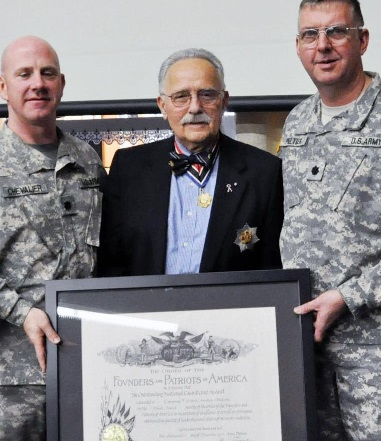
The 1-126th Aviation battalion of the Rhode Island National Guard was recognized by the OFPA in 2012. The certificate is being presented by Governor John Eastman of the Rhode Island Society.

The Order of the Founders and Patriots of America has a comprehensive Awards Program that provides for recognition of top-performing U.S. National Guard and ROTC units and graduating ROTC cadets plus deserving individual recipients. Awards are made by both the national Order and the state societies.

The "Order of the Founders and Patriots of America Award" has been called "the Heisman Trophy of Army ROTC" and is awarded based on criteria that include the number of United States Army officers a unit commissions and the academic performance of cadets.

The Order also underwrites individual annual awards to cadets and midshipmen at the four U.S. military academies that are named for past Governors General of the Order. The Admiral George Dewey Class of 1858 Award is presented to a United States Naval Academy midshipman, the Lt. General Herman Nickerson Sword Award is presented to a United States Marine Corps midshipman at the United States Naval Academy, the Lt. General John MacNair Wright Jr., Class of 1940 Award is presented to an outstanding West Point cadet and the Falcon Award for Physics is presented to a deserving United States Air Force Academy cadet.

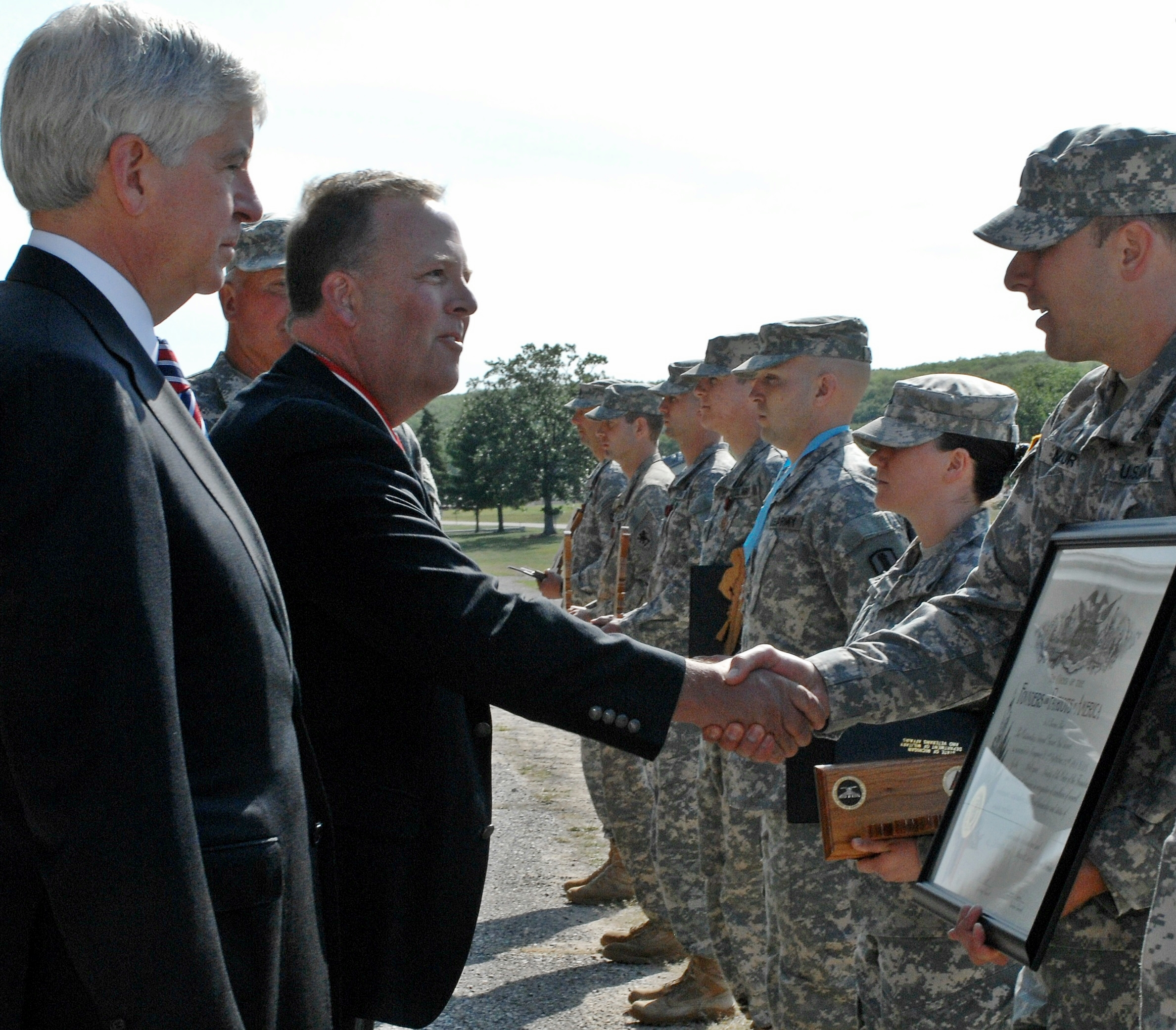
Governor of Michigan Rick Snyder escorts OFPA Michigan Society Governor David Miller as he recognizes the 238th Aviation Regiment of the Michigan National Guard as Michigan's best all-around National Guard unit in 2014.

=== Archives and monuments ===
The OFPA and its member societies fund the erection and installation of monuments and markers at the sites of historical occurrences in early United States and colonial American history. The Order maintains genealogical archives on its members. This includes 162 boxes of material deposited at Langsdale Library at the University of Baltimore that have also been digitized. Additional records curated by individual societies are stored elsewhere, including Rutgers University, and the Connecticut State Library.

=== Meetings ===
The general Order holds an annual meeting, known as the General Court, each year in May–June. The 124th General Court of the OFPA in 2020 was originally scheduled to be held in Plymouth, MA to celebrate the 400th anniversary of the Mayflower landing there. Due to COVID-19 restrictions, this General Court was moved to The Greenbrier Resort in White Sulphur Springs, West Virginia and held on June 10–12, 2020.

The 118th General Court in 2014 was held at the Seelbach Hilton Hotel in Louisville, Kentucky. To commemorate the general court being held in Kentucky, all of its associates were commissioned as Kentucky Colonels by the governor of Kentucky.

=== Publications ===
The OFPA periodically publishes The Bulletin, a semi-annual magazine for associates. The Order has also published multiple volumes of The Register, an index of the genealogical pedigree of all associates. Volumes 6 and 7 of The Register are currently available for purchase on the OFPA website. The Order also publishes a book entitled Founders of Early American Families, that contains historical information about the male heads of families who emigrated to the 13 original colonies from 1607 to 1657. The latest version is the Second Revised Edition that contains entries for 4,490 Founders plus a roster of current members, Governors, General Officers and a list of all past Governors General of the Order.

== Notable members ==
- Henry Adams - recipient of the 1919 Pulitzer Prize, descendant of John Adams
- Herman Vandenberg Ames - dean of the graduate school of the University of Pennsylvania
- Louis Annin Ames - President General of the Sons of the American Revolution and Flagmaker
- James J. Belden - member of the U.S. Congress
- Thomas W. Bicknell - American educator, historian, and author and noted anti-segregationist
- George H. W. Bush - 41st President of the United States
- Lucius E. Chittenden - member of the Vermont Senate
- Charles Gates Dawes - Vice President of the United States
- James D. Dewell - Lieutenant Governor of Connecticut
- George Dewey - Admiral of the U.S. Navy
- Ferdinand P. Earle - Brigadier General of the New York National Guard
- Frederick Dent Grant - Son of President Ulysses S. Grant and U.S. Ambassador to Austria
- Ulysses S. Grant III - Grandson of President Ulysses S. Grant and U.S. Army general
- Warren G. Harding - 29th President of the United States
- John B. Hattendorf, maritime historian.
- John Grier Hibben - president of Princeton University
- George Rogers Howell - American historian, genealogist, and writer
- James Kneeland - founder of the Milwaukee Gas Light Company
- William Libbey - 1912 U. S. Olympian
- Richard Worsam Meade III - U.S. Navy admiral
- Herman Nickerson, Jr - U. S. Marine Corps Lieutenant General
- Robert Barnwell Roosevelt - member of the U.S. Congress and Minister to the Hague
- William Cary Sanger - US Assistant Secretary of War
- William Howard Taft - President of the United States
- John Boyd Thacher - Mayor of Albany, New York
- Chauncey Pratt Williams - Adjutant-General of New York
- John B. Winslow - chief justice of the Wisconsin Supreme Court
- Stewart L. Woodford - Brigadier General of the Union Army, Lieutenant Governor of New York, member of the US House of Representatives, and 31st US Minister to Spain

== See also ==
- Daughters of Founders and Patriots of America
- Society of the Cincinnati
- Sons of the Revolution
- Sons of the American Revolution
- Founding Fathers of the United States
