= Charles Chauncey =

Charles Chauncey may refer to:

- Charles Chauncy (1592–1671), Anglo-American clergyman and educator
- Charles Chauncy (1705–1787), American Congregational clergyman
- Charles Chauncey (physician) (1706–1777), English physician, antiquary, and Fellow of the Royal Society
