= Ware Weir =

Weir on the River Lea in Hertfordshire, England

Coordinates: 51.811016°N 0.04166°W

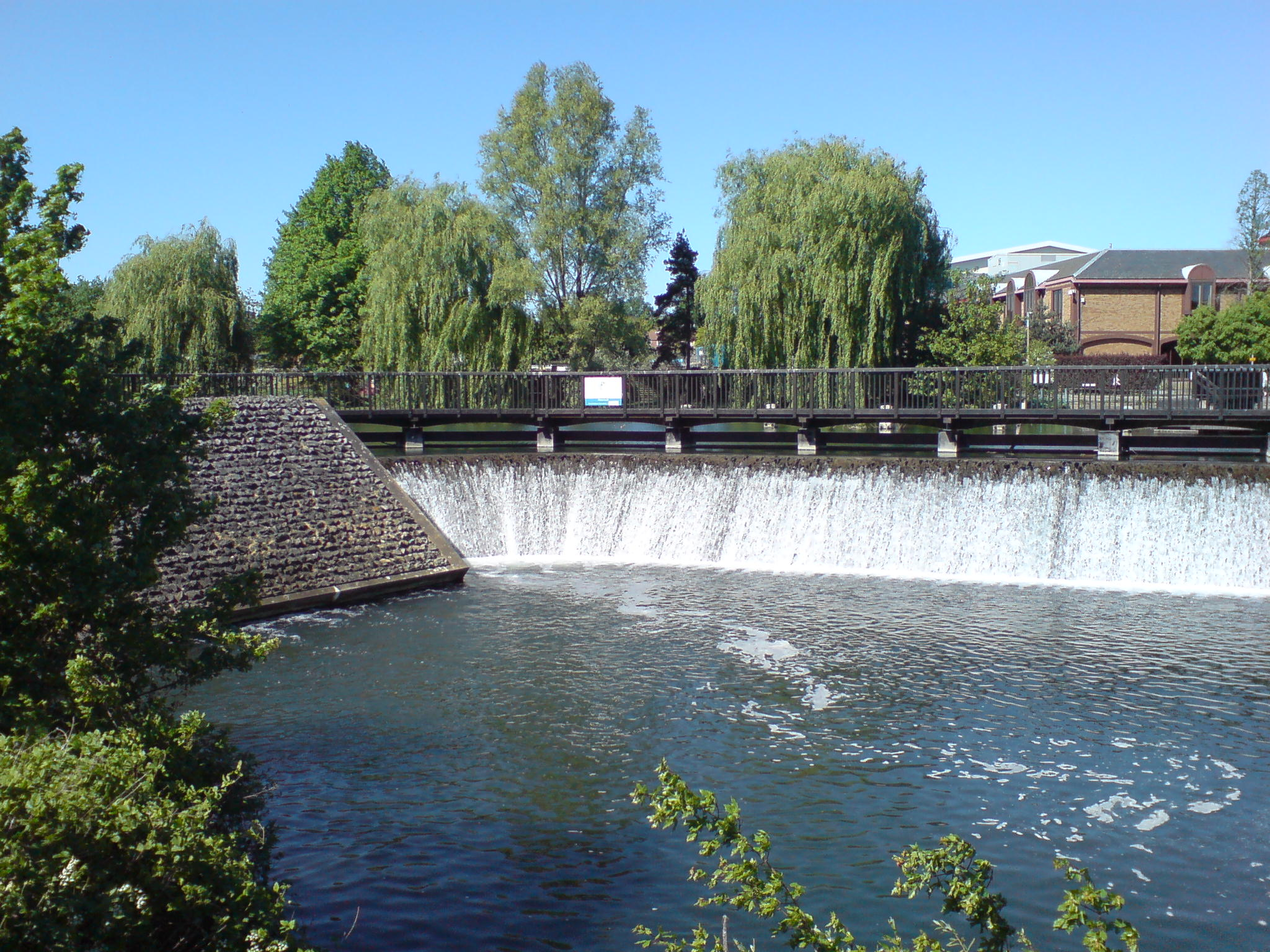
Ware Weir, GSK offices behind

Ware Weir is a large weir on the River Lea in Ware, Hertfordshire, England.
