= Great Bed of Ware =

16th-century English four-poster bed

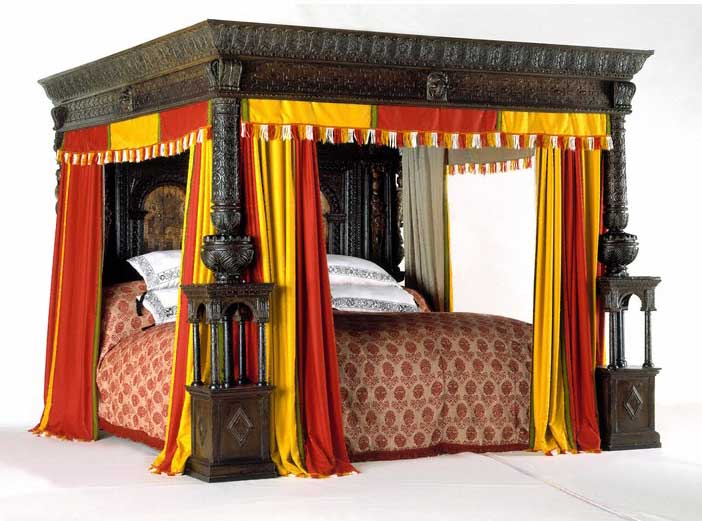
- Designer: Hans Vredeman de Vries; Jonas Fosbrooke (carpenter)
- Date: c. 1590–1600
- Made in: Ware, Hertfordshire, England (probably)
- Materials: Oak, carved and originally painted Marquetry panels
- Height: 267 cm (105 in)
- Width: 326 cm (128 in)
- Depth: 338 cm (133 in)
- Collection: Victoria and Albert Museum no. W.47:1 to 28-1931

The Great Bed of Ware is an extremely large oak four-poster bed, carved with marquetry, that was originally housed in the White Hart Inn in Ware, Hertfordshire, England. Built by the Hertfordshire carpenter Jonas Fosbrooke about 1590, the bed measures 3.38m long and 3.26m wide (ten by eleven feet) and can "reputedly... accommodate at least four couples". Many of those who have used the bed have carved their names into its posts.

Like many objects from that time, the bed is carved with patterns from European Renaissance art. Originally it would have been brightly painted, and traces of these colours can still be seen on the figures on the bed-head. The design of the marquetry panels is derived from the work of the Dutch artist Hans Vredeman de Vries (1527–1604) and the panels were probably made by English craftsmen working in London in the late Elizabethan period. The bed-hangings are modern re-creations of fabrics of the period.

By the 19th century, the bed had been moved from the White Hart Inn to the Saracen's Head, another Ware inn. In 1870, William Henry Teale, the owner of the Rye House, acquired the bed and put it to use in a pleasure garden. When interest in the garden waned in the 1920s, the bed was sold. In 1931, it was acquired by the Victoria and Albert Museum in London, which had previously turned down an opportunity to acquire the bed in 1865, describing it as a "coarse and mutilated relic in no wise appropriate as a new acquisition".

In 2012, the bed was exhibited in Ware Museum, on loan from the Victoria and Albert Museum.

== References to the Great Bed in literature ==
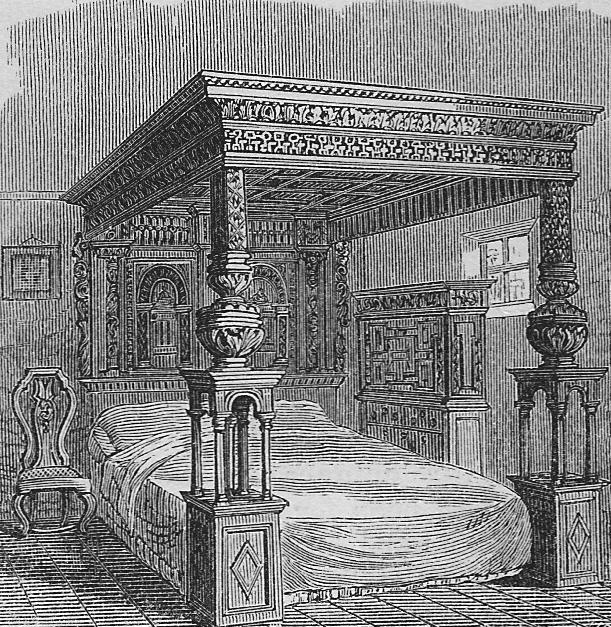
The Great Bed in the Saracen's Head, Ware, in 1877

The bed, which has been described as "one of the most famous pieces of furniture in history", has been referenced by writers since shortly after it was made:

- William Shakespeare's Twelfth Night (circa 1601)
- Ben Jonson's Epicoene, or the Silent Woman
- George Gordon Byron's Don Juan
- George Farquhar's The Recruiting Officer
- Djuna Barnes's Nightwood
- Loretta Chase's Last Night's Scandal (page 90)
- Sarah MacLean's No Good Duke Goes Unpunished
- Deanna Raybourn's "Silent on the Moor"
- Charles Dickens' The Holly Tree
- Wolfgang Hildesheimer's Tynset (1965, p. 188)
- Casey McQuiston’s Red, White & Royal Blue

== Bibliography ==
- Jackson, Anna, ed. (2001). V&A: A Hundred Highlights. V&A Publications.
