= Chauncey Bishop =

American football player and coach (1882–1927)

Biographical details
- Born: 1882; Crawfordsville, Oregon, U.S.
- Died: January 16, 1927 (aged 44–45); Pendleton, Oregon, U.S.

Playing career
- 1900: Columbia
- Position: End

Coaching career (HC unless noted)
- 1904–1906: Willamette

Robert Chauncey Bishop (1882 – January 16, 1927) was an American college football player and coach. He served as the head football coach at Willamette University in Salem, Oregon from 1904 to 1906. The son of a prominent Oregon clothing maker, Bishop played college football at Columbia University in New York City

Bishop died on January 16, 1927, in Pendleton, Oregon, after having accidentally shot himself while duck hunting nearby.
