= Chauncey Davis (politician) =

American politician (1812–1888)

Chauncey Davis (March 15, 1812 – February 9, 1888) was a politician in the state of Michigan.

== Biography ==
Davis was born on March 15, 1812, in Jefferson County, New York. Eventually he moved to Kenosha, Wisconsin, later moving again to Muskegon, Michigan. He died on February 9, 1888.

== Career ==
Davis served as the first mayor of Muskegon in 1860.

Davis served as a member of the Michigan House of Representatives from 1861 to 1864. He became mayor of Muskegon in 1870 and was reelected in 1872. He was involved in the lumber business, and he became president of the Lumberman's National Bank when it was founded in 1873.
