= Chauncey Heath =

Chauncey Heath may refer to:

- Chauncey E. Heath (1881–1965), member of the Wisconsin State Assembly
- Chauncey G. Heath (1818–1899), member of the Wisconsin State Assembly
