= Charles Chauncey (physician) =

English physician and antiquary

Charles Chauncey (1706–1777) was an English physician, antiquary, and Fellow of the Royal Society.

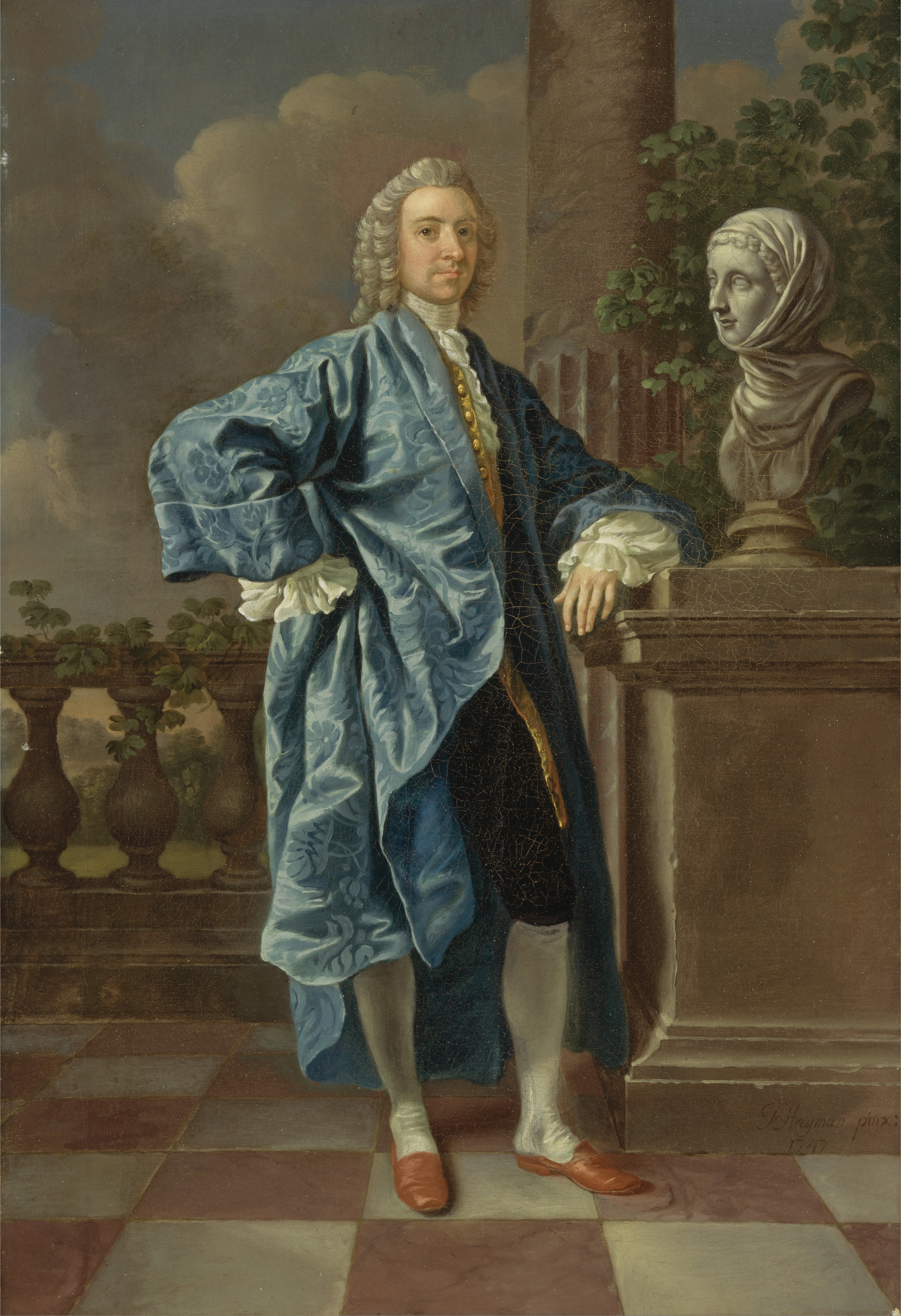
Charles Chauncey, 1747 portrait by Francis Hayman

== Life ==
He was the eldest son of Charles Chauncey, a London citizen, son of Ichabod Chauncey. He went to Benet College, Cambridge, in 1727, and graduated M.B. 1734, M.D. 1739. In 1740 he was elected a fellow of the Royal College of Physicians, and became a censor in 1740; portraits of Samuel Garth and of Richard Mead at the College of Physicians were given by him.

Chauncey was elected Fellow of the Royal Society, on 29 January 1740. His main reputation was as an antiquary and a collector of paintings and prints, coins and books. He died 25 December 1777, and was buried at St Peter's, Cornhill.

== Legacy ==
His brother Nathaniel, also a collector, succeeded to Chauncey's collections. Three sale catalogues, dated 1790, of pictures, coins, and books, were preserved in the British Museum.

== Notes ==
Attribution

This article incorporates text from a publication now in the public domain: Stephen, Leslie, ed. (1887). "Chauncey, Charles". Dictionary of National Biography. Vol. 10. London: Smith, Elder & Co.
