= USS Chauncey =

Three ships of the United States Navy have been named USS Chauncey to honor Commodore Isaac Chauncey.

- USS Chauncey (DD-3), was a destroyer, which served from 1901 to 1917.
- USS Chauncey (DD-296), was a Clemson-class destroyer, active 1918 to 1923.
- USS Chauncey (DD-667), was a Fletcher-class destroyer during World War II.
