= Chauncey Jerome =

American clockmaker

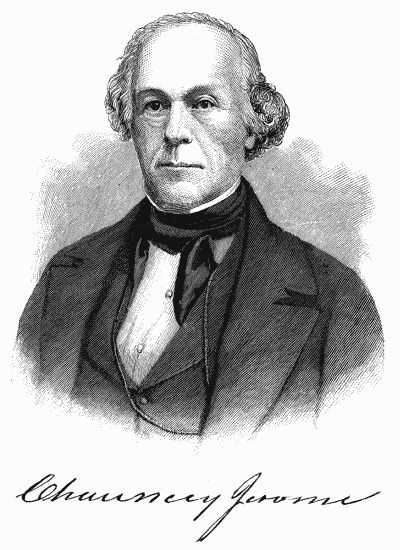
- Chauncey Jerome
- Born: June 10, 1793; Canaan, Connecticut, U.S.
- Died: April 20, 1868 (aged 74); New Haven, Connecticut, U.S.
- Known for: Invention of the OG (Brass & Glass) clock
- Children: 1
- Scientific career
- Fields: Clockmaker

Chauncey Jerome (1793–1868) was an American clockmaker and politician in the early 19th century. He made a fortune selling his clocks, and his business grew quickly. He was mayor of New Haven, Connecticut between 1854-1855. However, his company failed in 1856, and he died in poverty.

== Early life ==
Jerome was born in Canaan, Connecticut in 1793 to Sarah Noble and Lyman Jerome, a blacksmith and nail-maker. He later moved to Plymouth, Connecticut, where his father started a blacksmith shop. Jerome was a young boy when his father died, on October 5, 1804, and was forced to work in apprenticeship with salesmen. In one event, when walking around Bethlehem, Connecticut, to get to Torrington with his master, he noted how close he was to his mother in Plymouth, that night he made a run for it, running about twenty miles through woods, properties, farms, and in one case chased by dogs for a few miles, finally met his mother the next morning in Plymouth, the moment he contacted her, he realized it was morning and had to leave. He was victim of war at New Haven Fort, and when finished, he moved back to Plymouth to start an apprenticeship with Eli Terry.

== Career ==
Jerome began his career in Plymouth, making dials for long-case clocks. Jerome learned what he could about clocks, particularly clock cases, and then went to New Jersey to make seven-foot cases for clocks.

In 1816 he went to work for Eli Terry making "Patent Shelf Clocks," learning how to make previously handmade cases using machinery. Deciding to go into business for himself, Jerome began to make cases, trading them to Terry for wooden movements.

In 1822 Jerome moved his business to Bristol, opening a small shop off of West Street with his brother Noble, producing 30-hour and eight-day wooden clocks. The company installed the first circular saw ever seen in Bristol. Jerome invented the Bronze Looking Glass clock which was so successful he was able to help partially fund a new church in Bristol. He took note of all of the men who laughed at "Mr. Terry" for Terry's foolish ideas of selling a clock for a minor $14. Jerome came up with the idea of a rectangular shelf clock, brass in method, and sell-able for $1, the OG clock. Jerome sent his son, and a peddler who was a great friend of Jerome to England to sell his one dollar OG clocks.

By 1837 Jerome's company was selling more clocks than any of his competitors. A one-day wood-cased clock, which sold for six dollars, had helped put the company on the map. A year later his company was selling that same clock for four dollars. By 1841 the company was showing an annual profit of a whopping $35,000, primarily from the sale of brass movements.

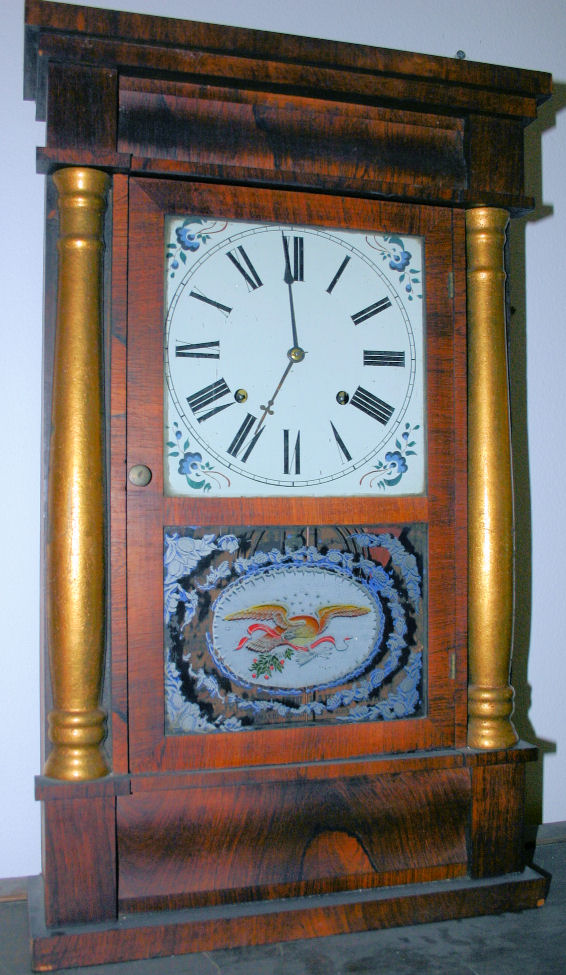
A 19th-century Chauncey Jerome clock

In 1842 Jerome moved his clock-case manufacturing operation to St. John Street in New Haven. Three years later, following a fire that destroyed the Bristol plant, Jerome relocated the entire operation to the Elm City within New Haven. Enlarging the plant, the company soon became the largest industrial employer in the city, producing 150,000 clocks annually. Because of his discovery of a method of stamping rather than using casting gears, Jerome was producing the lowest-priced clocks in the world at the time.

In 1842, Jerome began to sell his clocks in England, as most clocks made overseas did not sell well due to shipping problems. Jerome was initially unsuccessful, but managed to get a shopkeeper to buy two clocks. His clocks sold instantly, and soon the shopkeeper was ordering hundreds of clocks. Jerome's clocks ended up selling worldwide, with his clocks being found as far as Egypt and Jerusalem.

In 1850 Jerome formed the Jerome Manufacturing Co. as a joint-stock company with Benedict & Burnham, brass manufacturers of Waterbury. By this point, he was selling hundreds of thousands of clocks every year. In 1853 the company became known as the New Haven Clock Co., producing 444,000 clocks and timepieces annually.

In 1854, Jerome was elected mayor of New Haven, where he served as mayor until 1855.

Jerome's future should have been secure but in 1855 he bought out a failed Bridgeport clock company controlled by P.T. Barnum, which wiped him out financially, leaving the Jerome Manufacturing Co. bankrupt. He indicated that his son, his company's secretary, made the mistake. Jerome never recovered from the loss. By his own admission, he was a better inventor than businessman.

At age 63, Jerome was financially ruined, being forced to move out of his mansion to a rental in Waterbury. Traveling from town to town, Jerome took jobs where he could, often working for clock companies that had learned the business of clock making using Jerome's inventions. Returning to New Haven near the end of his life, he died, penniless, in 1868 at age 74.

Nevertheless, Jerome had made a historic contribution to his industry when he substituted brass works for wooden works, said to be "the greatest and most far-reaching contribution to the clock industry."

He made, and lost, a fortune selling his clocks and was perhaps the most influential and creative person associated with the American clock business during the mid-19th century. In addition he served as a legislator in 1834, a Presidential elector in 1852 and mayor of New Haven from 1854 to 1855.

Always humble, of his own life he wrote: "The ticking of a clock is music to me, and although many of my experiences as a business man have been trying and bitter, I have satisfaction of knowing that I have lived the life of an honest man, and have been of some use to my fellow men."

== Legacy ==
In 1852, the Chauncey Jerome Jr, a packet ship Blue Ball Line was built in his name. The ship ran aground in Long Branch, New Jersey in 1854.

As late as the 1940s, an English traveler remarked, “In Kentucky, in Indiana, in Illinois, in Missouri, and here in every dell in Arkansas, and in cabins where there was not a chair to sit on, there was sure to be a Connecticut clock.”
