= Isaac Chauncey =

United States Navy officer

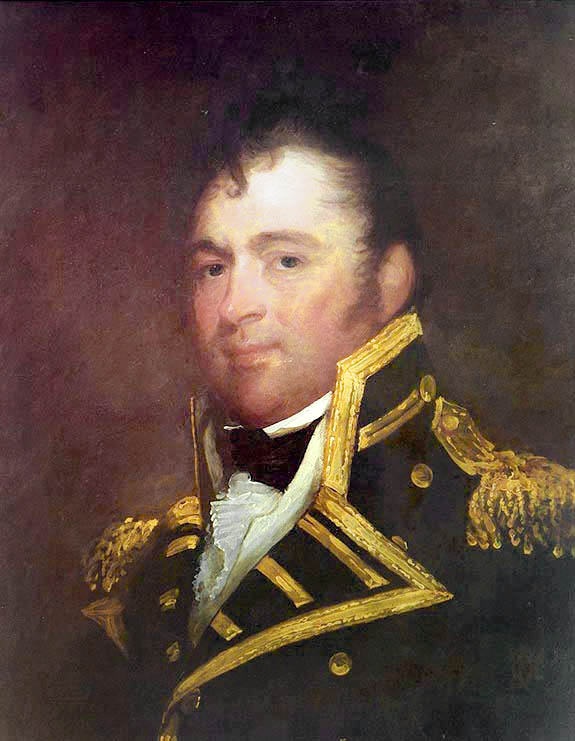
- Born: February 20, 1772; Black Rock, Province of Connecticut, British America
- Died: January 20, 1840 (aged 67); Washington, D.C., U.S.
- Burial place: Congressional Cemetery Washington, D.C., U.S.
- Military career
- Allegiance: United States
- Branch: United States Navy
- Service years: 1798–1840
- Rank: Commodore
- Commands: General Greene; John Adams; Hornet; Washington
- Conflicts: Quasi-War; First Barbary War; War of 1812
- Other work: President of the Board of Navy Commissioners (1837–40)

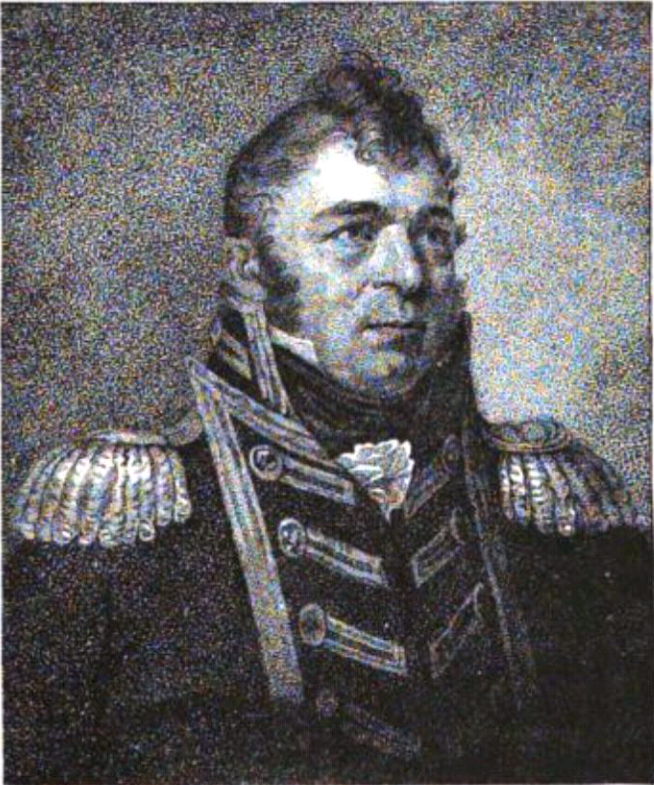
Captain Isaac Chauncey. USN

Isaac Chauncey (February 20, 1772 – January 27, 1840) was a United States Navy officer who served in the Quasi-War, the Barbary Wars and the War of 1812. In the latter part of his naval career he was President of the Board of Navy Commissioners.

== Involvement in the Quasi-War and First Barbary War ==
Chauncey, born in Black Rock, Connecticut, to Wolcott Chauncy and Ann Brown. His father was the great-great-grandson of Charles Chauncy, the 2nd President of Harvard College. At 19, he was given the command of the ship Jenny, belonging to Peter Schermerhorn, grandfather of Mrs. Astor, and was appointed a lieutenant in the Navy from September 17, 1798. He fought with gallantry in the West Indies during the Quasi-War with France. In a letter dated 21 July 1802 he was ordered to take command of General Greene for an anticipated deployment to the Mediterranean during the First Barbary War. In a letter dated 13 August the order was rescinded and he and her crew were transferred to USS New York. He served in the Mediterranean during the First Barbary War; and commanded John Adams (1804–5), On 17 March 1805 he received permission from the Secretary of the Navy to go on furlough. In a letter dated 27 June he was notified that he would be called back to active service, probably to command Hornet (1805–6), Washington and the Mediterranean Squadron (1815–1820). He was promoted to captain in 1806.

== War of 1812 ==
Perhaps his most outstanding service was during the War of 1812 when he commanded the naval forces on Lake Ontario, conducting amphibious operations in cooperation with the Army, and containing the British fleet under the command of Sir James Yeo stationed there. One of his most successful operations was taking part of a naval hit-and-run raid by transporting Winfield Scott's force of raiders in the successful raid at York, Upper Canada from July 31, 1813 – August 1, 1813. The American raiders freed prisoners in jail, made wounded soldiers their captives (on paper), and confiscated British military baggage left there and whatever else they could find.

== Further career ==
Chauncey went on to be Brooklyn's longest serving commandant from July 13, 1807 to May 16, 1813, and again from December 21, 1824 to June 10, 1833. His letters to the Secretary of the Navy provide perhaps the fullest description of the navy by a career naval officer of the early yard. These letters deliver rich detail about the officers and employees, and the problems he encountered making the new yard a viable concern.

Writing November 27, 1807, to the Secretary of the Navy, Chauncey pleads for maintenance funds – "The following things are almost indispensable to promote the public service and for the accommodation of the yard. Two wells to be sunk, in the yard, with pumps in them, windows in the armory, a horse & cart to transport stores, fill holes about the wharf &c &c The tide ebbs & flows in 24 hours consequently leaving a dampness that must destroy the timber next to the ground very soon There is sufficient for the horse in the yard Six wheel barrows with more other little conveniences which I will hope you will leave to my discretion I will not abuse you're your confidence."

Commodore Chauncey was particularly tough when negotiating wages. Writing on January 5, 1808, to Secretary of the Navy Robert Smith he explained "Some of them (in consequence of Mr. Buckland having mentioned publicly that twenty three gun boats was to be built) immediately had an idea that we could not do without them and would not go to work.

I however was able to find a sufficient number willing to work at the reduced wages and these who refused will in a week come back and beg for work and I shall be able to reduce their wages 25 cents more for the merchants have no work for them to do therefore they must either work for us at our price or go unemployed."

In May 1829, while in command of the shipyard, Chauncey led a series of searches for the body of George Washington Adams, who committed suicide by jumping from the deck of the steamship Benjamin Franklin.

In December 1835 Chauncey led navy yard marines and sailors in suppressing the Great Fire of New York by blowing up buildings in the fire's path.

His last service was as member, and, for four years, President, of the Board of Navy Commissioners. Commodore Chauncey died in Washington, on January 27, 1840.

== Legacy ==
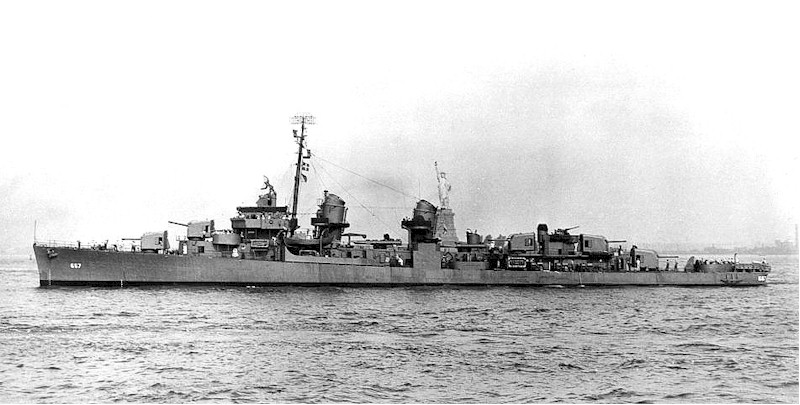
USS Chauncey ship

- Three different classes of destroyers USS Chauncey were named in his honor

Chauncey Street in Brooklyn, New York is named after him.

Issac was married to Catherine Sickles (c. 1778 – 1855).

The couple lived in Fairfield, Connecticut where they had three children.

- Charles W. Chauncey
- John S. Chauncey
- Peter Schermerhorn Chauncey (1810–1866)
  - Augusta Chauncey married to Maj. Elbert Ellery Anderson (1833–1903). Founding father William Ellery was his great-great-granduncle. His father was Knight commander Henry James Anderson, and his mother was Frances Da Ponte, daughter of Lorenzo Da Ponte of Venice, the father of Italian Opera in the United States, and associate of Amadeus Mozart. He was also cousin of Elbert Jefferson Anderson, a millionaire of 1892, son of Lt. Col. Elbert Jefferson Anderson.
    - Peter Chauncey Anderson married to Mary Yale Ogden, and were members of the "Social Register" of New York. She was the daughter of Elias Hudson Ogden and Martha Louise Goodrich. Her grandparents were Dr. Oren Goodrich and Olivia Yale, daughter of Colonel Braddam Yale, members of the Yale and Ogden families. She was a distant relative of Edith Ogden (the wife of Carter Harrison IV –himself a mayor of Chicago and a cousin of US President William Henry Harrison) and Aaron Ogden (U.S. senator and governor of New Jersey).
