= Chauncey Hare =

American photographer (1934–2019)

- Born: June 19, 1934; California, US
- Died: May 12, 2019 (aged 84); California, US
- Education: Master of Fine Arts, San Francisco Art Institute
- Known for: Photography
- Notable work: Interior America (1978); This Was Corporate America (1984); Protest Photographs (2008)
- Awards: 3 Guggenheim Fellowships; 3 NEA Fellowships

Chauncey Hare (June 19, 1934 – May 12, 2019) was an American photographer who began his working life as a petroleum engineer for Standard Oil. He became a fine-art photographer known for his photographs of people living in 1970s American residential interiors, workplaces, and office spaces.

== Work ==
In 1969, 1971, and 1976 Hare was awarded photography fellowships by the John Simon Guggenheim Memorial Foundation. In 1975, 1978, and 1982 he was awarded photography fellowships by the National Endowment for the Arts.

In 1977 Hare stopped working as a petroleum engineer after twenty-one years at what became a Chevron refinery in Richmond, California and enrolled in the MFA program in photography at the San Francisco Art Institute. That same year the Museum of Modern Art in New York exhibited Hare's photographs in a show entitled Interior America. The next year, Aperture published a book of the same name and by the early 1980s other museums including the San Francisco Museum of Modern Art had featured Hare's photographs in exhibitions.

In 1985, Hare abandoned photography and returned to school, becoming a therapist. As a therapist he published Work Abuse: How to Recognize and Survive It in 1997.

Hare's photography books include Interior America (1978), This Was Corporate America (1984), and the expanded edition of the former, Protest Photographs (2008).

In Diana & Nikon, Essays on the Aesthetic of Photography, Janet Malcolm describes how even Hare's most mundane photographs, "quiver" with meaning "so that everything stands for something else." She saw a link between his careers, noting that he arranged his photographic subjects the way a therapist does, using free association. Malcom argued for the importance of "Chauncey Hare’s acid portrayal of late-twentieth-century America, writing that "Hare enters the homes that Robert Frank sped by when taking the pictures for The Americans."

The British writer Tim Adams, in a 2022 Guardian photo essay, called "The Big Picture: The Pursuit of Happiness in Playland California," notes that Hare himself saw his psychoanalytic work as "the antithesis of his art," yet "the two strands of his life both flash-lit the alienating values of the consumerist US and the promise of the pursuit of happiness in suburbia".

In 2021, Robert Slifkin published Quitting Your Day Job: Chauncey Hare's Photographic Work. It has been noted in press that his workplace photography was a protest against what Hare saw as exploitative and inhumane working practices.

Slifkin also writes that between 1968 and 1972, Hare frequently photographed Playland, an amusement park near his home in Richmond, California. Exploring many aspects of Hare's life, the book notes "the ways in which his work continues to resonate with contemporary concerns about the reach of corporations into everyday life, documentary photography's longstanding complicity with the politics of liberal guilt, and art's vexed relation to elite channels of power."

== Publications ==
=== Photography ===
- Interior America. New York City: Aperture, 1978. ISBN 978-0893810542. With an introduction by Hare.
- This Was Corporate America. Boston: Institute of Contemporary Art, 1984. ISBN 978-0910663403.
- Protest Photographs. Göttingen, Germany: Steidl, 2008. ISBN 978-3865214959. With an introduction by Hare.

=== Therapy ===
- Work Abuse: How to Recognize and Survive It (1997)
