= Chauncey Nye =

Chauncey Nye (1823–1900) was a pioneer of the U.S. state of Oregon who was best known as the first person to publish an account about Crater Lake.

== Biography ==
Born in Michigan in 1823 to Nathan Nye, he accompanied his brother Nathan B. Nye (1831–1913) to Logtown, (Presently, El Dorado) El Dorado County, California, in 1849 or early 1850, during the California Gold Rush to work claims in that area. By 1852, Nathan had arrived in a pioneer party in Oregon, and Chauncey may have come with him. It is certain Chauncey was in Oregon by 1860 where he is listed, age 37, in Jackson County.

He is known as the first person to publish an account about Crater Lake:

In 1862, Chauncey Nye and his party of prospectors also came upon the lake. Nye wrote the first published article about the lake, stating "the waters were of a deeply blue color causing us to name it Blue Lake."

By 1870, Chauncey had given up hunting gold and settled down on a farm with his wife Amarantha, who was born about 1834 in Illinois or Michigan. The family lived for at least thirty years at Flounce Rock, Jackson County, Oregon. Their children were Etta (1867), Nelson (1871), and Elsie Amarantha (1879). In 1882, Chauncey completed his homestead at Township 33S Range 2 East.

He is buried next to his wife at Nye Cemetery in Jackson County.

== Legacy ==
Nye Spring and Nye Ditch are both named for him.
