= Chauncey Steele =

Chauncey Steele may refer to:

- Chauncey Steele Jr. (1914-1988), American tennis player, father of Chauncey Steele III
- Chauncey Steele III (born 1944), American tennis player, son of Chauncey Steele, Jr.
