= Chauncy Jerome Jr Shipwreck Site =

- U.S. National Register of Historic Places
- New Jersey Register of Historic Places
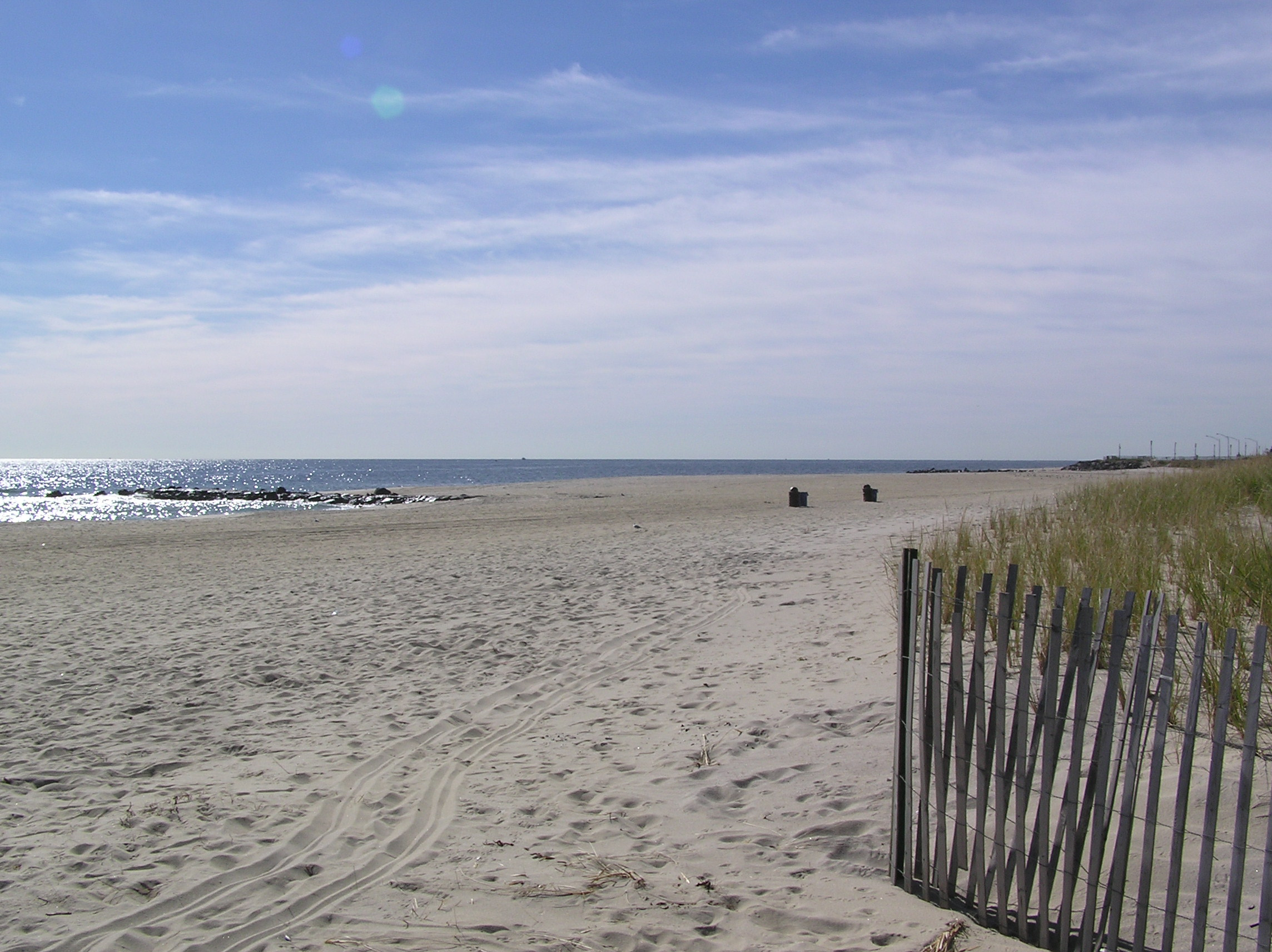
- Nearest city: Long Branch, New Jersey
- Area: 1.5 acres (0.61 ha)
- Built: 1851
- Architect: Hubbard, Mathew
- Architectural style: Mid-19th-century packet ship
- NRHP reference No.: 96000205
- NJRHP No.: 3353

Significant dates
- Added to NRHP: March 1, 1996
- Designated NJRHP: January 5, 1996

Chauncy Jerome Jr Shipwreck Site is located in Long Branch City, Monmouth County, New Jersey, United States. The ship was built in 1852 in East Haddam, Connecticut. It was named after Chauncey Jerome, a 19th-century clockmaker from Connecticut. It was 137 x 37 ft and weighed 1154 tons. The ship was a packet ship of the Blue Ball Line. The ship ran aground and sunk on January 12, 1854, and currently rests at 20 feet below the water near Seven Presidents Oceanfront Park. It was added to the National Register of Historic Places on March 1, 1996.

== See also ==
- National Register of Historic Places listings in Monmouth County, New Jersey
