= Ichabod Chauncey =

English physician and alleged plotter (1635–1691)

Ichabod Chaunc(e)y, LRCP (1635–1691) was an English physician and nonconformist divine. He was an army chaplain at Dunkirk before 1660, beneficed in Bristol, ejected from his living for nonconformity in 1662, and practised medicine at Bristol from 1662 to 1684. He was banished from England for nonconformity and other offences in 1684, and returned to Bristol in 1686.

== Origins ==
Ichabod Chauncey was born at the vicarage at Ware, Hertfordshire, the second son of Charles Chauncy (1592–1672), the Puritan minister of Ware, by his wife Catherine, née Eyre (1604–c. 1672). Charles was suspended for his opposition to Laudianism and in 1638 emigrated with his family to colonial New England, where he became a minister and president of Harvard College.

== Rise and fall ==
Ichabod graduated B.A. from Harvard in 1651 and proceeded M.A. in 1654 before returning to England. He was chaplain to Sir Edward Harley's regiment at Dunkirk at the time the Uniformity Act was passed. Shortly afterwards he obtained a living in Bristol, and, being ejected for nonconformity, practised physic there for eighteen years, and obtained a considerable practice. In his Innocence vindicated he states that in 1684 he was a M.A. of thirty years' standing, and for twenty had been a licentiate of the London College of Physicians.

In 1682 he was prosecuted for not attending church and other religious offences under the Religion Act 1592. His defence was that he accommodated his worship as nearly as he could to that of the primitive church, but he was convicted and fined. In 1684 he was again prosecuted under the same act, and was imprisoned in the common gaol for eighteen weeks before he was tried, when he was sentenced to lose his estate both real and personal, and to leave the realm within three months. From a declaration drawn up by the grand jury, he appears to have been in the habit of defending such dissenters in Bristol as were prosecuted under the various acts relating to religion; but from the Records of the Broadmead Meeting, Bristol, his persecution appears to have originated in the private malice of the town clerk.

== Later life and death ==
Chauncey resided in Holland, where he studied medicine at Leiden and ministered to a congregation, until 1686, when a pardon allowed him to return to Bristol. There he died on 25 July 1691 and was interred on 27 July in St Philip's churchyard. His wife, Mary, and three sons—Staunton, Charles, and Nathaniel (1679–1750)—survived him; the second son was the father of Charles Chauncey, a physician; the third son served an Independent congregation at Devizes, Wiltshire, for nearly fifty years.

== Works ==
His only work is Innocence vindicated by a Narrative of the Proceedings of the Court of Sessions in Bristol against I. C., Physician, to his Conviction on the Statute of the 36th Elizabeth, 1684. This was printed in Holland during his exile there, and provided a defence of his actions in England.

== Sources ==
- Benedict, Jim (2008). "Chauncey, Ichabod (1635–1691), physician and alleged plotter". Oxford Dictionary of National Biography (online ed.). Oxford University Press. doi:10.1093/ref:odnb/5195. (Subscription, Wikipedia Library access or UK public library membership required.)
- Chauncy, Ichabod (1684). Innocence vindicated by a brief and impartial narrative of the proceedings of the Court of Sessions in Bristol against Ichabod Chauncy, physitian in that city, to his conviction on the statute of the 35th Eliz. on the 9th of April, and to his abjuration of all the Kings dominions for ever, Aug. 15, 1684: together with some passages subsequent thereunto / published by the said I. Chavncy. London: George Larkin. pp. 1–15.

Attribution:

- This article incorporates text from a publication now in the public domain: Bickley, Augustus Charles (1887). "Chauncey, Ichabod". In Stephen, Leslie (ed.). Dictionary of National Biography. Vol. 10. London: Smith, Elder & Co. p. 169.
