= Chauncy School =

Location
- Park Road; Ware, Hertfordshire, SG12 0DP; England
- 51.8148°N 0.0454°W

Information
- Type: Academy
- Motto: Promoting Student Achievement
- Department for Education URN: 137090 Tables
- Ofsted: Reports
- Chair of governing body: Robert Watson
- Headteacher: Stephen Walton
- Staff: above 100
- Gender: Mixed
- Age: 11 to 18
- Enrolment: 1,292
- Houses: Ash; Birch; Chestnut; Elm; Hazel; Maple; Oak; Pine; Rowan; Willow
- Colours: Green and Yellow
- Publication: Chauncy News
- Website: https://chauncyschool.com/

Chauncy School is a secondary school located in Ware, Hertfordshire in the East of England. It is the only mixed secondary school in Ware. The school pride themselves on accepting students of any ability, and has had increasingly improved results for 13 years running. In Jan 2013, OFSTED described Chauncy School as 'an inspiring and exciting place to be.' In 2017, OFSTED rated Chauncy School as outstanding.

== Admissions ==
The school accepts students of any ability and background. Sixth Form requires A*-C grades, but negotiations are permitted. The admissions limit for Year 7 in September 2011 was 160.

== Leavers ==
65% of year 11s 2011 stayed in Chauncy for 6th form and 27% went on to further education. 53% of year 13s in 2011 went to University in the UK and 30% went to college.

== History ==
Chauncy School was formed in 1982 upon the merger of two local comprehensive schools, The Trinity School (first known as Ware C of E Secondary Modern School) opened in 1961) and Fanshawe School. Dwindling class sizes had resulted in a need for the authorities to reassess Ware's schools and despite a long campaign to retain both schools, the decision was made to close the Trinity site and use the Fanshawe site. The decision was made to change the name to Chauncy to unify the town and erase local rivalries from the two former schools. As of the beginning of the school year for 1982–83, the Fanshawe School site opened as Chauncy School. Until 1985, the old Trinity School site was kept open for pupils in the 5th and 6th forms, and then they too joined the Park Road site.

In 2015 the school filed two planning applications with East Herts District Council. These included the sale of land for housing to fund the development of a new sports facility. The new sports facility was officially opened on Friday 24 February 2017.
