= Ware, Hertfordshire =

Town in Hertfordshire, England

Coordinates: 51°48′39″N 0°01′53″W

Ware
- Town, civil parish
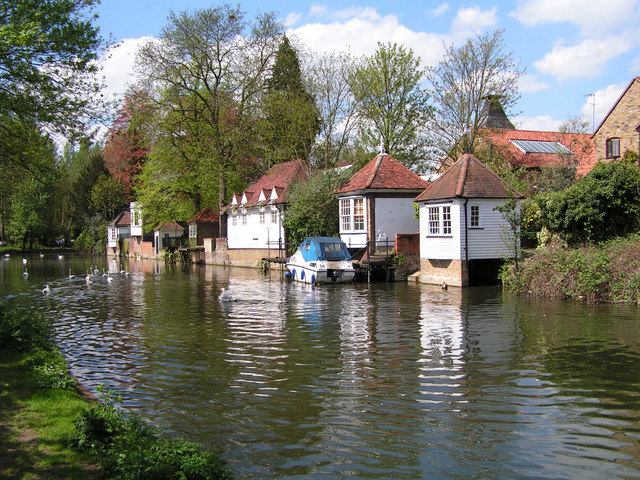
- Riverside gazebos

- Location within Hertfordshire
- Interactive map showing parish boundary
- Population: 19,627 (2021 census)
- OS grid reference: TL 358143
- District: East Hertfordshire
- Shire county: Hertfordshire
- Region: East
- Country: England
- Sovereign state: United Kingdom
- Post town: Ware
- Postcode district: SG12
- Dialling code: 01920
- Police: Hertfordshire
- Fire: Hertfordshire
- Ambulance: East of England
- UK Parliament: Hertford and Stortford

Ware is a town and civil parish in the East Hertfordshire district of Hertfordshire, England. It lies to the east of the county town of Hertford. At the 2021 census, the parish had a population of 19,627.

== History ==
Archaeology has shown that Ware has been occupied since at least the Mesolithic period (which ended in about 4000 BC). The Romans had a sizeable settlement here and foundations of several buildings, including a temple, and two cemeteries have been found. Ware was on Ermine Street, the Roman road from London to Lincoln. A well-preserved Roman skeleton of a teenage girl was found beside the road and nicknamed 'Ermintrude'. It has been said that Ware is one of the oldest continuously occupied sites in Europe.

In the Domesday Book of 1086, the town was named Waras from the natural weirs in the River Lea. The historic rivalry with nearby Hertford can be traced to 1090 when the Lady of Ware (Petronilla de Grandmesnil, Countess of Leicester) diverted Ermine Street from the Roman ford to create a High Street and new bridge over the Lea. The bailiff of Hertford tried to destroy the new bridge before it was recognised as part of the King's Highway by Henry III in person. In 1381, during the so-called Peasants' Revolt, 42 prominent Ware townsmen, led by the Vicar, joined others in destroying Hertford Castle, then owned by John of Gaunt. Many inns were established in the High Street, reflecting Ware's importance as a coaching stop on the Old North Road. Chaucer mentioned Ware twice in The Canterbury Tales. The Great Bed of Ware, cited by Shakespeare and other playwrights, was housed in a succession of Ware inns.

Mary I had Thomas Fust burned at the stake in Ware marketplace for refusing to convert to Catholicism.

In the 17th century, Ware became the source of the New River, constructed to take fresh water into London. The Ware Mutiny occurred on 15 November 1647, between the First and the Second English Civil War at Corkbush Field, when soldiers were ordered to sign a declaration of loyalty to Thomas Fairfax, the commander-in-chief of the New Model Army (NMA), and the Army Council. When some with Leveller sympathies refused to do this they were arrested and court-martialled; one of the ringleaders, Trooper Richard Arnold, was shot. 62 children were sent to Ware after the 1666 Great Fire of London. In 1683, the Rye House Plot involved assassinating Charles II after he passed through Ware. It failed.

England's first turnpike (toll) road was established at Wadesmill, two miles north of Ware, in 1633 in an attempt to control the malting traffic into and from Ware. The town had become a major maltmaking centre during the Civil War and soon became the most important supplier of malt to the Common Brewers of London, with its own quoted price on the London grain market, particularly for brown malt, used in brewing porter beer. The Ordnance Survey First Edition of 1880 showed 107 malt kilns in Ware, more than twice as many as in any other Hertfordshire town. The last working malting in Ware, Pauls Malt at Broadmeads, closed in 1994. In November 1999, the bronze Maltmaker statue by Oxfordshire sculptor, Jill Tweed, was unveiled outside St Mary's Church to commemorate the end of the industry and the Millennium. The unveiling was done by Hugo Page Croft, member of a famous Ware malting family; others involved in the project were Guy Horlock, chairman of the Stanstead Abbots maltsters, French & Jupps Ltd, and David Perman, curator of the Ware Museum.

Two legends associated with the 17th century are sometimes mentioned. One is that bargemen born in Ware were given the "freedom of the River Thames" — avoiding the requirement of paying lock dues — as a result of their transport of fresh water and food in during the Great Plague of London of 1665–66. In fact, Ware barges were freed from having to carry a pilot in the Port of London as a result of their relieving the Dutch blockade of the Thames in 1667, by bringing in coal brought overland from the Wash. The other legend is that Ware bargemen brought plague bodies out of London in 1666 and interred them at the Buryfield. The truth is that the Burymead was mentioned as early as 1513 and referred to the present Glaxo site where a number of Roman cemeteries have been found; the Buryfield Recreation Ground was established in 1931 on charity land, the Bell Close, now partly covered by the GSK multi-storey car park.

At the end of the 19th century, malt-making in Ware was joined by two other industries. In 1886, Dennis Wickham, member of a brewing family, established a bottling plant which in 1900 moved to Viaduct Road and became an engineering company. The firm of D. Wickham & Co. became manufacturers of railcars and construction equipment, closing in 1991. In 1898, the pharmaceutical company, Allen & Hanburys, acquired a lease on the Ware corn mill and began building a medicines, dried milk and health foods factory at the nearby Buryfield. A new plant for pharmaceutical research and development was built in Park Road during World War II. Allenburys, as it was known, was merged with Glaxo in 1958 and is now part of GSK plc.

== Features ==
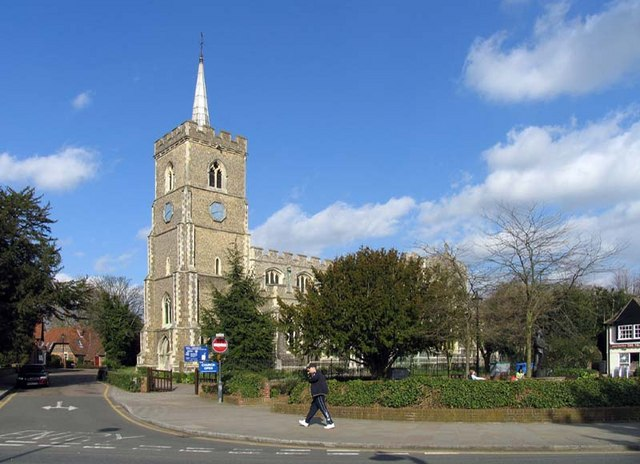
St Mary's Church

Ware has 202 listed buildings including fourteen grade II* and three grade I, one of which is the remains of a 14th-century friary, now the offices of Ware Town Council and a conference, wedding and function venue called Ware Priory and Fletcher's Lea. Recent restoration work has shown that it dates from the 13th century. Opposite the priory is the large 14th-century St Mary's parish church. It is known for its elaborate font with large carved stone figures. The town is also famous for its many 18th-century riverside gazebos, several of which have been restored recently.

The Lee Navigation is a canalised river incorporating the River Lea, which runs through the centre of the town; it is one of its most popular tourist attractions, as well as being home to a thriving boating community.

Ware is also known for the Great Bed of Ware, which is mentioned in Shakespeare's Twelfth Night and is reputedly able to accommodate at least four couples. It is in the Victoria and Albert Museum in London, but from April 2012 until April 2013 it was loaned to the museum in Ware.

Ware is mentioned in The Canterbury Tales and was also the unintended destination of John Gilpin in William Cowper's comic poem.

Some of the buildings along the High Street date back to the 14th century. Ware used to have many coaching inns and passageways between some shops lead to their stables. Many of these passageways also have former maltings. Crib Street has a good sequence of timber-framed buildings which have been restored since the 1970s. Today the town's main employer is GSK plc, which has large manufacturing and research plants in the town. The Ware company was formerly Allen & Hanburys and has a long connection with the town, with many historical items on view in a section on the company in the Ware Museum. There are also many other small factories.

Fairport Convention's 1971 album "Babbacombe" Lee was inspired by an old newspaper story that fiddle player Dave Swarbrick bought in an antiques shop in the High Street of Ware when the band lived at The Angel former public house in nearby Little Hadham.

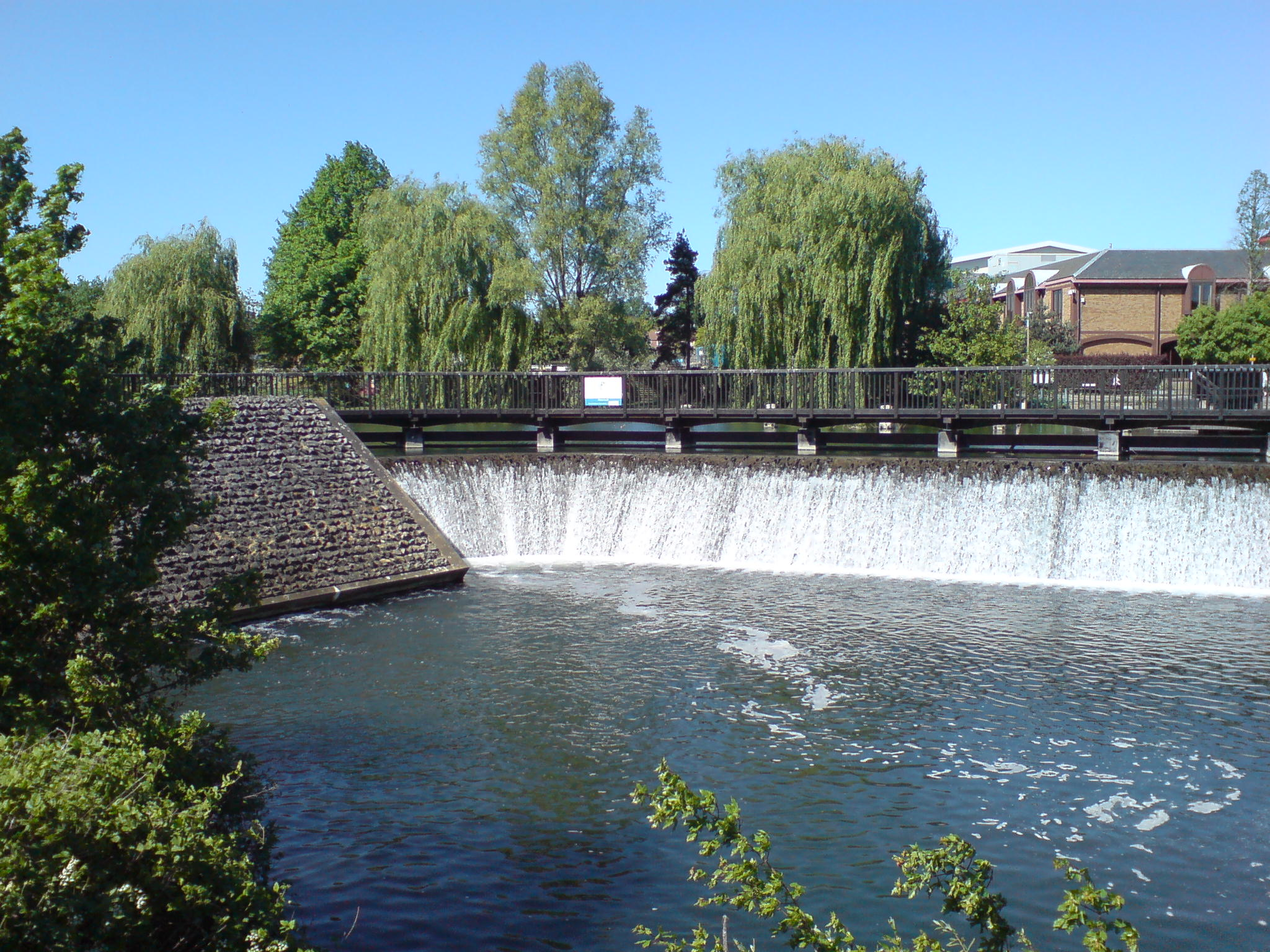
Ware Weir. The GSK offices are in the background.

== Places of interest ==
=== Ware Museum ===
Ware has its own museum which, in 2008, received full accreditation from the Museums, Archives and Libraries Council. The museum is independent and run completely by volunteers. In 2012–2013, Ware Museum was home to the Great Bed of Ware on loan for one year from The Victoria and Albert Museum in London. The bed is reputedly haunted by the ghost of its alleged maker, Jonas Fosbrooke, who is said to harass any non-royal person who attempts to sleep in the bed.

The museum is partially housed in the former Priory Lodge and partly inside a Second World War Command Bunker used to co-ordinate local defences and respond to air-raids; this part was refurbished for 2010. The museum contains many interesting items from the history of Ware, including Roman archaeology, exhibits relating to the Second World War and Allen & Hanburys pharmaceuticals. There are also a number of exhibits for children and many special activity days throughout the year.

=== Scott's Grotto ===
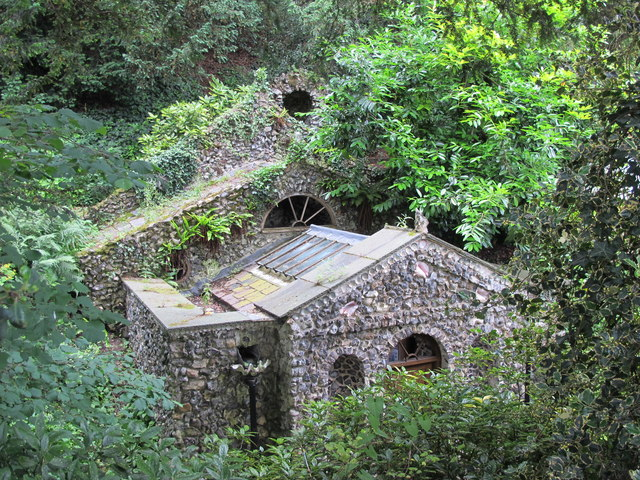
Scott's Grotto

Ware is home to Scott's Grotto, built for John Scott, an 18th-century poet who owned Amwell House from 1768. The grotto, the largest in the UK, is a series of chambers extending over 65 ft (20 m) into the chalk hillside. The chambers are decorated with shells, stones such as flint and coloured glass. The grotto was restored in 1990 by the Ware Society and is now owned and managed by the Scott's Grotto Trust; it is grade I listed.

=== Bluecoat Yard ===
In Bluecoat Yard is Place House, Ware's oldest extant surviving building. It dates from the early 14th century, with additions in the 16th and 17th centuries, and was once Ware's Manor House. It has a crown post roof.

== Governance ==
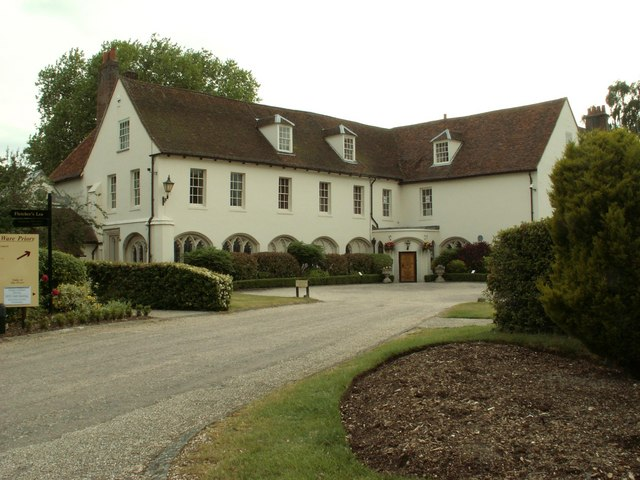
Ware Priory

There are three tiers of local government covering Ware, at parish (town), district, and county level: Ware Town Council, East Hertfordshire District Council, and Hertfordshire County Council. The town council is based at Ware Priory at the western end of High Street.

=== Administrative history ===
Ware was an ancient parish in the Braughing Hundred of Hertfordshire. As well as the town itself, the parish also included adjoining rural areas, particularly to the north-east of the town around Wareside. Prior to the 16th century Ware was sometimes called a borough, but it never had a borough charter from the monarch nor did it send members to Parliament.

The town was given improvement commissioners in 1811, with responsibilities to pave and light the streets. In 1835, Ware became the centre of a poor law union, a group of parishes which collectively administered their responsibilities under the poor laws. The Ware Union Workhouse was completed in 1840 on Collett Road (then called Musley Lane) to serve the union.

The town was made a local board district in 1849, administered by an elected local board. The board replaced the improvement commissioners and had more extensive powers, particularly regarding sewerage and water supply. The district covered the built up part of the parish of Ware plus an area known as Amwell End, a southern suburb of the town which was in the neighbouring parish of Great Amwell.

Such local board districts were reconstituted as urban districts under the Local Government Act 1894. The 1894 Act also directed that civil parishes could no longer straddle district boundaries, and so the old parish of Ware was split into two parishes: Ware Urban for the part within the urban district, and Ware Rural for the part outside it. Ware Rural parish was included in the Ware Rural District and was renamed Wareside in 1991.

Ware Urban District Council was initially based at the Town Hall at 8 West Street (not to be confused with the former cornmarket that had previously been called Town Hall at 70 High Street overlooking the market place). The Town Hall on West Street comprised an early eighteenth-century house on the street frontage, behind which were a large public hall and meeting rooms which had been built in 1867, initially as a Corn Exchange. The Corn Exchange business failed in 1875. The following year the building was bought by a new company called the Ware Town Hall and Assembly Rooms Company. The urban district council rented rooms there to serve as its offices and meeting place.

In 1920, the urban district council was effectively given Ware Priory; its owner, Anne Elizabeth Croft, gave the council a 999–year lease at a nominal rent of 3 shillings a year. The priory was built in the 14th century as a Franciscan friary, and had been converted into a house following the dissolution of the monasteries in the 16th century. The council then used Ware Priory as its offices and meeting place. Most of the former Town Hall at 8 West Street was demolished in the 1950s, leaving only the original house at the front, which is now known as Rankin House.

Ware Urban District was abolished in 1974 under the Local Government Act 1972, when district-level functions passed to the new East Hertfordshire District Council. A successor parish was created covering the former urban district of Ware, with its parish council taking the name Ware Town Council.

Coat of arms, granted 1956

Ware Urban District Council had been granted a coat of arms on 26 March 1956. The arms were transferred to the new Ware Town Council in 1975. On the arms, the barge rudders reference the bargemen of Ware, with the red and white striping on the rudders being the livery colours of the City of London, associating the Ware bargemen's free entry rights to that city; the crossed coach horns reference the town's long history as a coaching town; and the sheaves of barley reference the town's malting history. The motto "cave" (Latin for "beware") is a pun on the town's name.

== Demographics ==
At the 2021 census, Ware civil parish had a population of 19,627 people in 8,525 households. The Office for National Statistics also define a Ware built-up area, which is entirely within the civil parish boundary but excludes some undeveloped areas; this had a population of 19,625 in 2021. (Note: Built up area populations are rounded to the nearest five.)

Census population of Ware parish
Census	Population	Female	Male	Households	Source
2001	17,193	8,787	8,406	7,185	
2011	18,799	9,573	9,226	8,011	
2021	19,627	10,173	9,454	8,525	

== Transport ==
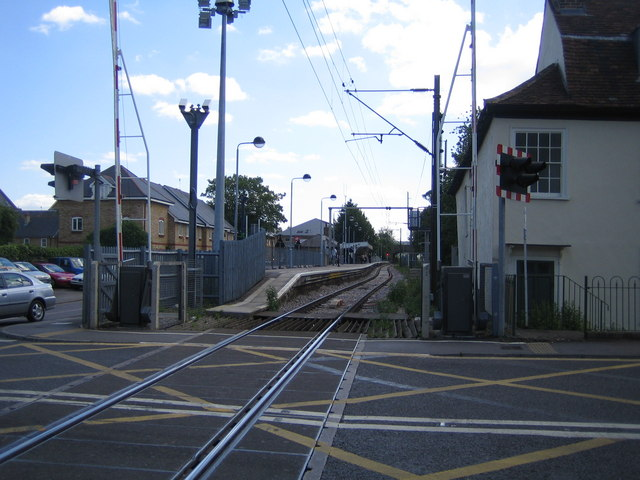
The level crossing at Ware station

Ware railway station is a stop on the Hertford East Branch Line; its close proximity to London makes Ware a commuter town. Greater Anglia operates two trains per hour in each direction between Hertford East and London Liverpool Street, with additional services at peak times.

Bus services are provided primarily by Arriva Herts & Essex, Central Connect and Centrebus (South), connecting the town with Hatfield, Hertford, Stevenage, Welwyn Garden City and Heathrow Airport.

The town lies on the north–south A10 road which is partly shared with the east–west A414 (for Hertford to the west and Harlow to the east). The large Kingsmead Viaduct crosses the River Lea at Kings Meads. The two-mile bypass opened on 17 January 1979 at a cost of £3.6 million (equivalent to £18 million in 2025). The former route of the A10 through the town is now the A1170.

== Education ==
=== Nursery and primary ===
There are fourteen primary schools in Ware and surrounding villages as of March 2022.

There are also many preschools and nurseries, including long-established Orchard House Preschool and the newest Riverside Nursery School.

=== Secondary ===
There are two secondary schools in the town: Presdales School and Chauncy School. Presdales School opened in 1906 as Ware Grammar School and became a fully comprehensive school in the early 1970s. It admits girls aged 11–18 and boys into the sixth form. It is one of nine lead language hub schools in England. Chauncy School is co-educational throughout.

=== Post-secondary education ===
The Creative & Enterprise Campus of Hertford Regional College is also based in the town. A new £10.5 million building opened in 2015 and is used to teach 3D design, graphic design, fashion design, visual merchandising, set design, photography, art & design, fine art, animation & multimedia and creative & digital media.

All Nations Christian College is located in nearby Easneye. This missionary Bible college offers a variety of programmes ranging from short unvalidated courses to Open University validated post-graduate qualifications.

== Culture ==
=== Sport and leisure ===
==== Wodson Park Sports and Leisure Centre ====
Wodson Park Sports and Leisure Centre is located on the north side of Ware. It is owned and operated by the Wodson Park Trust which is a community based charity providing sports and recreation facilities for the people of East Hertfordshire. It has an extensive range of sports and entertainment facilities including indoor sports halls, restaurants and an external athletics facility. It is also the home to Ware's football clubs.

==== Drill hall ====
The Ware Drill Hall was constructed in 1899 at a cost of £5,250 and is a grade II listed building in the centre of Ware. The building was listed due to its early use of a steel parabolic roof structure. It is home to sporting clubs and community facilities and hosts many sporting, cultural and music events throughout the year. The facility is currently operated by The Ware Drill Hall Association (WDHA).

==== Cricket ====
There is evidence to suggest that cricket has been played in Ware since before 1770. The present Ware Cricket Club has its grounds at Bell Lane in Widford.

==== Bowls ====
The Ware Bowling Club was founded in 1926 and is located in grounds behind Ware Priory. In 2008, it became Bowls England's "club of the year".

==== Football ====
Ware has two non-League football teams. Ware F.C. was founded in 1892 and play their home games at Wodson Park sports centre in the north of the town. Wodson Park F.C., founded in 1997, also play their games at the sports centre but on a separate pitch.

Ware also has two youth football teams. Ware Lions FC was founded in 1968 and is based at Woodson Field in Thundridge. They consist of 3 teams: The Blacks, The Stripes and The Whites. Ware Youth FC, founded in 1973, based on Fanhams Hall Road, Trinity Playing Fields.

==== Golf ====
The Chadwell Springs Golf centre is located in Ware and completed a major refurbishment programme in 2019.

==== Rugby ====
Hertford Rugby Football Club was formed in 1932, as the Old Hertfordians by a group of enthusiasts from Hertford Grammar School. The club played at six different venues until moving to their present location at Hoe Lane in Ware in 1949. It is also home to the Old Hertfordians Squash Club which has two courts there.

==== Running ====
Ware Joggers is a running club with opportunities for all abilities. It organises annual 10 mile and 10 km races at the beginning of July as part of the Ware Festival.

==== Scouting and Girlguiding ====
Ware was one of the first places outside of London to take up the Scouting movement; it now has many Scout and Girlguiding units. Ware and District Scouts includes eight Scout groups and three Explorer Scout units and covers an area from Hunsdon to Buntingford.

==== Swimming ====
Ware has two swimming pools: one indoor and one outdoor. The Fanshawe Pool and Gym is located in Park Road. The Ware Priory Lido was built in 1934. It has a main pool measuring 30 m (98 ft) and a smaller teaching pool, both heated to 28°c in the summer. It was substantially altered in the 1970s, with new changing rooms, and is situated in the grounds of Ware Priory. It was refurbished in early 2026.

Following a meeting of "The Townsfolk of Ware" in May 1934, it was agreed that a "swimming club" be formed. This is still running today and is now based at Fanshawe Pool.

=== Festivals and events ===
==== Ware Festival and Rock in the Priory ====
The Ware Festival Committee organises a wide range of events throughout July; these include a lively Carnival Parade, an Over 60s' Party, Raft Race and a Teddy Bears' Picnic, culminating in the 'Rock in the Priory' a one-day open-air music festival.

==== Ware fireworks display ====
For over 30 years, there has been an annual fireworks display in Ware on the nearest Saturday to Guy Fawkes Night. The display was originally organised by the Round Table organisation; however, in recent years it has been taken over by the three Rotary Clubs in Ware: The Rotary Club of Hertford Shires, The Rotary Club of Ware and The Rotary Club of Amwell. The event is held in a field off High Oak Road and attracts many thousands of attendees. All the profits from the event are donated to local and international charities supported by Rotary.

==== Dickensian Evening ====
Dickensian Evening is an annual event that celebrates the work of Charles Dickens, in particular, his festive novella A Christmas Carol; it takes place on the first Friday in December each year.

The event is run through the town centre and the Drill Hall is also used for pitches and stalls. Some of the festivities include carol singing, fairground amusements and a craft market, making it an enjoyable event for all ages.

=== Literature ===
Edward Lear makes reference to Ware in More Nonsense Pictures, Rhymes, Botany, etc:

There was an old person of Ware,
Who rode on the back of a bear:
When they ask'd, - 'Does it trot?'--
He said 'Certainly not!
He's a Moppsikon Floppsikon bear!'

=== Media ===
Ware is within the BBC London and ITV London region. Television signals are received from the Crystal Palace TV transmitter and the local relay transmitter situated in Hertford. BBC East and ITV Anglia can also be received from the Sandy Heath TV transmitter. Local radio stations are BBC Three Counties Radio and Heart Hertfordshire. The town is served by the local newspaper, Hertfordshire Mercury.

== Religion ==
Among the churches in Ware, the most prominent are St Mary the Virgin, on the town's high street, and Christ Church.

== Twin towns ==
Ware is twinned with Cormeilles-en-Parisis in France and Wülfrath in Germany.

== Notable people ==
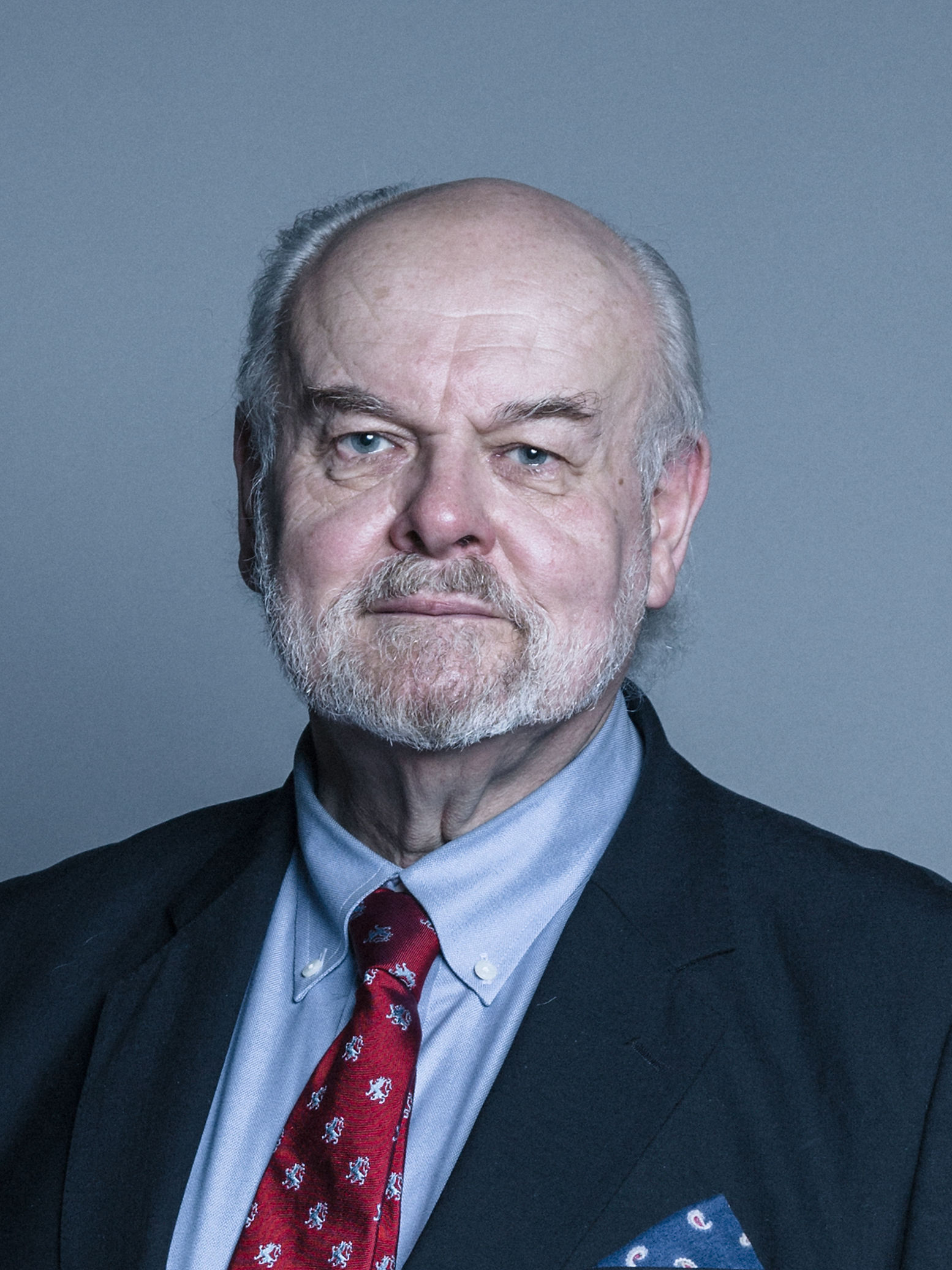
Richard Chartres, 2018

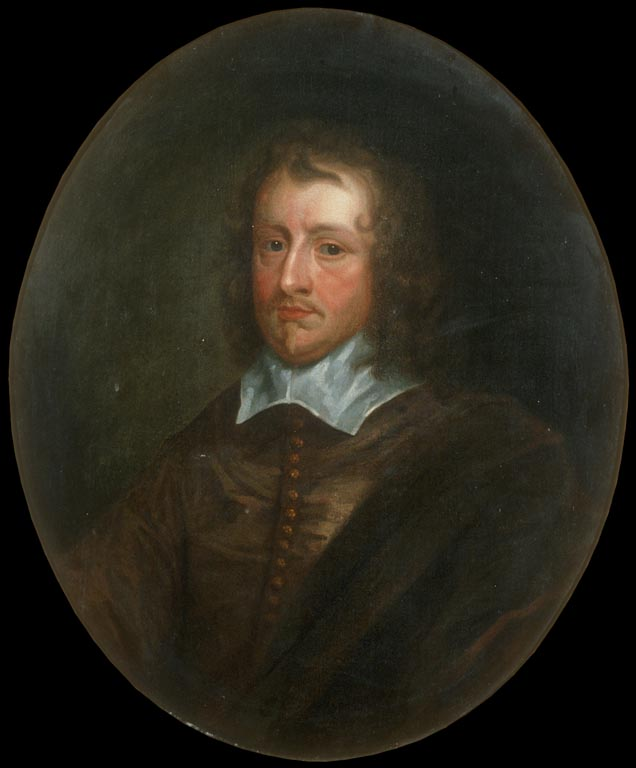
Sir Richard Fanshawe, 1648

- Michael William Balfe (1808–1870), composer, owned the country estate Rowney Abbey
- Russ Ballard (born 1945), musician and composer, lead singer and guitarist of Argent; lives between Ware and Thundridge
- Charlie Brooks (born 1981), actress (Janine Butcher in EastEnders)
- Henry Coddington (1798/9—1845), Vicar of Ware, 1832–45, FRS and optics inventor
- Richard Chartres, Baron Chartres (born 1947), retired Bishop of London
- Peter Clift (born 1966) marine geologist and geophysicist in the US
- Henry Page Croft, 1st Baron Croft (1881–1947), decorated soldier and Conservative politician.
- Herbert Deveril (1840–1911), a photographer in Australia and New Zealand.
- Samuel Herbert Dougal (1847–1903), notorious villain hanged for murdering a woman he had conned; was licensee of the Royston Crow public house in Baldock Street
- Sir Richard Fanshawe (1608–1666), poet, translator, MP, ambassador to Spain 1662–66.
- Nino Firetto (born 1957), radio presenter, TV host and actor
- William Godwin (1756–1836), philosopher; congregational minister in Dead Lane (now part of Church Street) 1778-9
- Sir Nigel Hawthorne (1929–2001), actor, lived in the nearby village of Cold Christmas
- William Lister (1756–1830) physician, became Governor of St Thomas' Hospital.
- Minnie Minoprio (born 1942) actress, singer and showgirl, mainly active in Italy.
- The Subways (formed in 2002), an English rock band from Welwyn Garden City.
- Brian Wilde (1927–2008), actor, played Foggy in Last of the Summer Wine and Mr Barrowclough in Porridge
- William of Ware; between 1290 and 1305 was a Franciscan friar and philosopher

=== Sport ===
- Marc North (1966–2001), footballer with Leicester City and Grimsby Town with 185 club caps
- John Pelly (1888–1945), cricketer and Royal Navy officer
- Derek Saunders (1928–2018) footballer, played 203 games for Chelsea F.C.
- Stuart Storey (born 1942), athlete and sports commentator; associated with Ware and the Wodson Park Sports facility.
