= Chauncey Pratt Williams =

American historian, banker, and soldier (1860–1936)

Chauncey Pratt Williams (December 6, 1860 – December 25, 1936) was an American historian, banker, and soldier.

Williams graduated from Sheffield Scientific School at Yale University, where he was a member of the varsity crew, and the Albany Law School. He was president of the Albany Exchange Bank and, from 1909 to 1917, served as adjutant-general of the New York National Guard. Williams wrote extensively on the history of the American West, including biographies of the trappers Antoine Robidoux and Bill Williams; United States Senator Philip Schuyler; and frontiersmen John Hoback and John Coulter. His works on this subject are held at Yale's Beinecke Rare Book and Manuscript Library.

In 1886 he married Emma McClure.
