= Harvard University =

Private university in Cambridge, Massachusetts, US

- Coat of arms
- Latin: Universitas Harvardiana
- Former name: Harvard College
- Motto: Veritas (Latin)
- Motto in English: "Truth"
- Type: Private research university
- Established: October 28, 1636 (390 years ago)
- Founder: Massachusetts General Court
- Accreditation: NECHE
- Religious affiliation: Nonsectarian
- Academic affiliations: AAU; COFHE; NAICU; UArctic; URA; Space-grant
- Endowment: $68.0 billion (2026)
- Budget: $6.7 billion (2025 Fiscal Year ending June 30)
- President: Alan Garber
- Provost: John F. Manning
- Academic staff: ~2,400 faculty members (and >10,400 academic appointments in affiliated teaching hospitals)
- Students: 21,189 (fall 2024)
- Undergraduates: 7,038 (fall 2024)
- Postgraduates: 14,151 (fall 2024)
- Location: Cambridge, Massachusetts, US; 42°22′28″N 71°07′01″W
- Campus: 209 acres (85 ha); Midsize city
- Newspaper: The Harvard Crimson
- Colors: Crimson, white, and black
- Nickname: Crimson
- Sporting affiliations: NCAA Division I FCS – Ivy League; ECAC Hockey; NEISA; CWPA; IRA; EAWRC; EARC; EISA
- Mascot: John Harvard
- Website: www.harvard.edu

Harvard University is a private Ivy League research university in Cambridge, Massachusetts, United States. Founded in 1636, and named Harvard College in 1639 in honor of its first benefactor, Puritan clergyman John Harvard, it is the oldest institution of higher learning in the United States. Its influence, wealth, and rankings have made it one of the most prestigious universities in the world.

Harvard was founded and authorized by the Massachusetts General Court, the governing legislature of colonial-era Massachusetts Bay Colony. While never formally affiliated with any Protestant denomination, Harvard trained Christian clergy of Congregational denomination until its curriculum and student body were gradually secularized in the 18th century. In 1780, the Constitution of Massachusetts referred to it as a university, and a new medical school established in 1782 was named the Medical Institution of Harvard University; but this was a new name, not a new foundation. Harvard College soon became the name of the university's undergraduate division.

By the 19th century, Harvard had emerged as the most prominent academic and cultural institution among the Boston elite. Following the American Civil War, under Harvard president Charles William Eliot's long tenure from 1869 to 1909, Harvard developed multiple professional schools, which transformed it into a modern research university. In 1900, Harvard co-founded the Association of American Universities. James B. Conant led the university through the Great Depression and World War II, and liberalized admissions after the war.

The university has ten academic faculties and a faculty attached to Harvard Radcliffe Institute. The Faculty of Arts and Sciences offers study in a wide range of undergraduate and graduate academic disciplines, and other faculties offer graduate degrees, including professional degrees. Harvard has three campuses: the 209-acre (85 ha) main campus in Cambridge centered on Harvard Yard; an adjoining campus immediately across the Charles River in the Allston neighborhood of Boston; and the medical campus in Boston's Longwood Medical Area. Harvard's endowment, valued at $55.7 billion, makes it the wealthiest academic institution in the world. Harvard Library, with more than 20 million volumes, is the world's largest academic library.

== History ==
=== 17th century ===
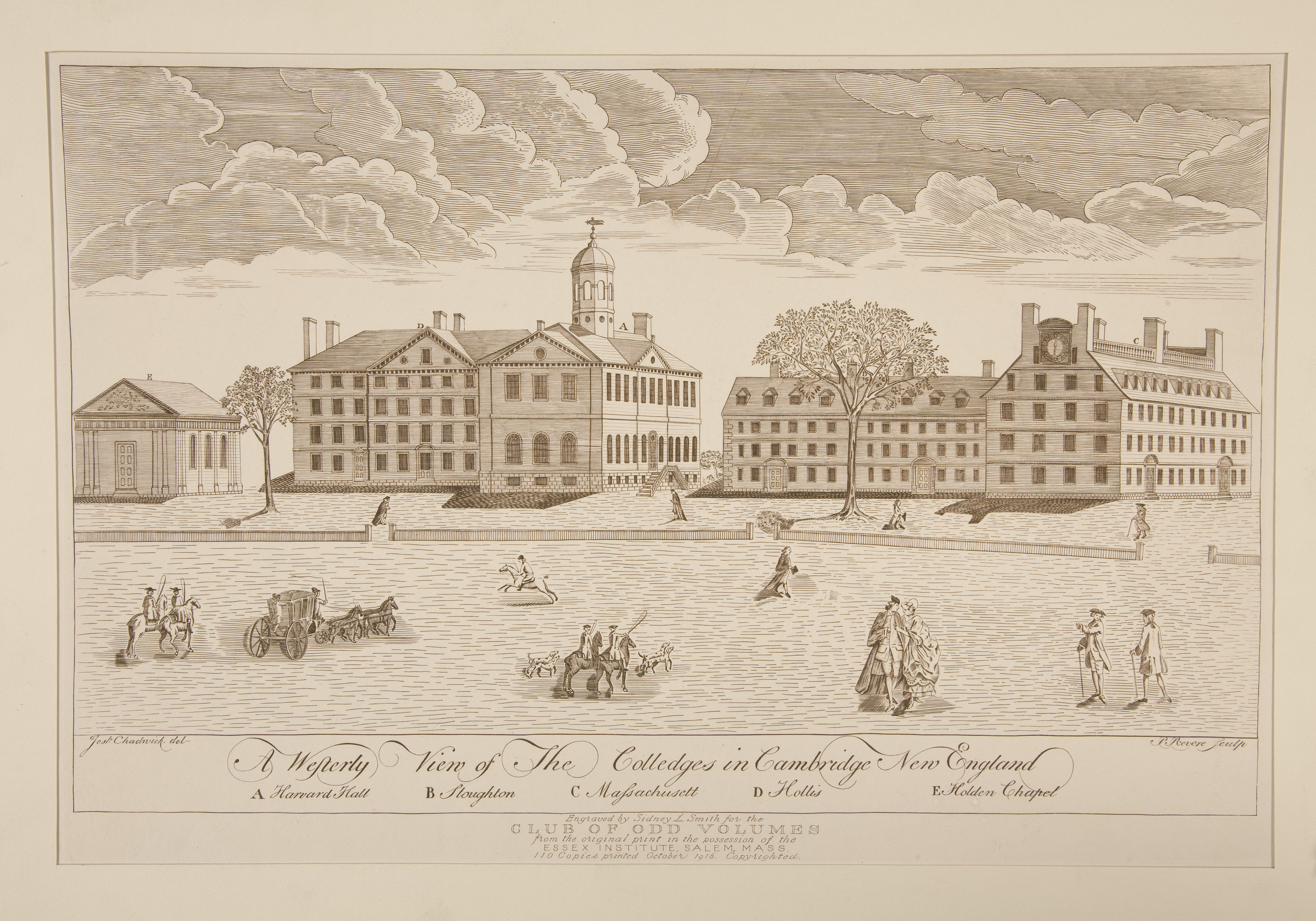
A 1767 engraving of Harvard College by Paul Revere

Harvard was founded in 1636 by a vote of the Great and General Court of the Massachusetts Bay Colony. Its first headmaster, Nathaniel Eaton, took office the following year. In 1638, the university acquired English North America's first known printing press. The same year, on his deathbed, John Harvard, a Puritan clergyman who had emigrated to the colony from England, bequeathed the emerging college £780 and his library of some 320 volumes; the following year, it was named Harvard College.

In 1643, a Harvard publication defined the college's purpose: "[to] advance learning and perpetuate it to posterity, dreading to leave an illiterate ministry to the churches when our present ministers shall lie in the dust."

In its early years, the college trained many Congregational ministers and offered a classical curriculum based on the English university model exemplified by the University of Cambridge, where many colonial Massachusetts leaders had studied prior to emigrating to the colony. Though Harvard College never formally affiliated with any particular Protestant denomination, its curriculum conformed to the tenets of Puritanism. In 1650, the charter for Harvard Corporation, the college's governing body, was granted.

From 1681 to 1701, Increase Mather, a Puritan clergyman, served as Harvard's sixth president. In 1708, John Leverett became Harvard's seventh president and the first president who was not also a clergyman.

=== Harvard seal ===
The earliest known official seal of Harvard College, commonly referred to as the Seal of 1650 or the In Christi Gloriam seal, features a square shield bearing three open books arranged around a central chevron. This design symbolizes the pursuit of learning under divine guidance. The motto IN CHRISTI GLORIAM ("To the glory of Christ") appears prominently on the seal, which is encircled by the Latin inscription SIGILL COL HARVARD CANTAB NOV ANGL 1650, meaning "Seal of Harvard College Cambridge New England 1650." This seal reflects the original religious mission of the institution.

In 1885, the Harvard Corporation adopted a revised design known as the Appleton Seal, based on an earlier version created by President Josiah Quincy in 1843. Designed by William Sumner Appleton (Harvard AB 1860), the seal features a triangular shield bearing three open books with the motto VERITAS ("Truth"). Surrounding the shield is the motto CHRISTO ET ECCLESIÆ ("For Christ and the Church"), and the outer border bears the inscription SIGILLVM ACADEMIÆ HARVARDINÆ IN NOV. ANG. ("Seal of Harvard College in New England"). This version of the seal sought to harmonize the university's intellectual pursuits with its ecclesiastical roots.

=== 18th century ===
Harvard faculty and students largely supported the Patriot cause during the American Revolution.

In the second half of the 18th century, Harvard began granting graduate and doctorate-level degrees. In 1780, the Constitution of Massachusetts recognized Harvard College as a university, and when in 1783 a new medical school was established, it was given the formal name of the Medical Institution of Harvard University. This was a renaming of the college, and not a re-founding.

=== 19th century ===
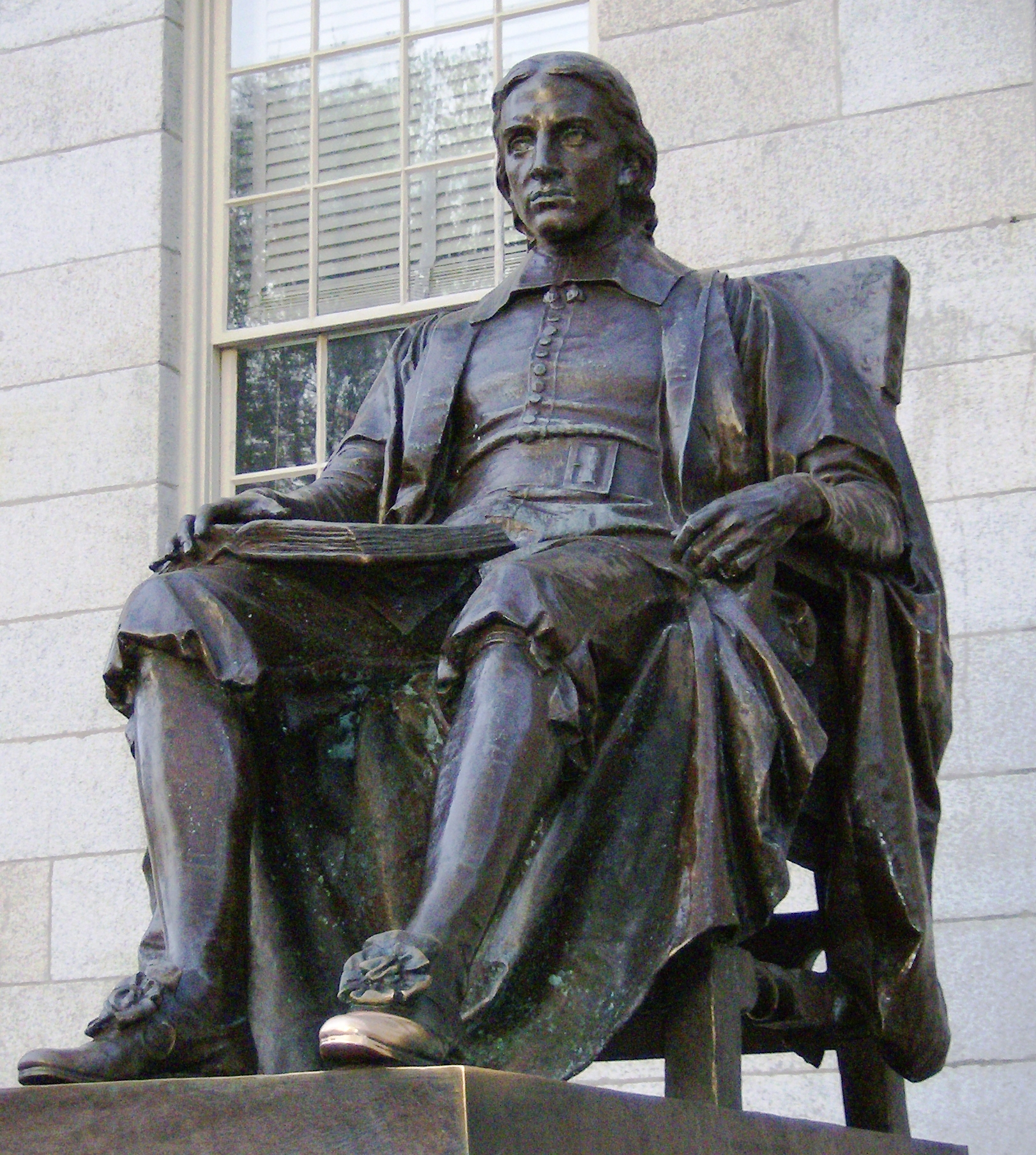
The John Harvard statue in Harvard Yard

In the 19th century, Harvard was influenced by Enlightenment Age ideas, including reason and free will, which were widespread among Congregational ministers and which placed these ministers and their congregations at odds with more traditionalist, Calvinist pastors and clergies. Following the death of Hollis Professor of Divinity David Tappan in 1803 and that of Joseph Willard, Harvard's eleventh president, the following year, a struggle broke out over their replacements. In 1805, Henry Ware was elected to replace Tappan as Hollis chair. Two years later, in 1807, liberal Samuel Webber was appointed as Harvard's 13th president, representing a shift from traditional ideas at Harvard to more liberal and Arminian ideas.

In 1816, Harvard University launched new language programs in the study of French and Spanish, and appointed George Ticknor the university's first professor for these language programs.

From 1869 to 1909, Charles William Eliot, Harvard University's 21st president, decreased the historically favored position of Christianity in the curriculum, opening it to student self-direction. Though Eliot was an influential figure in the secularization of U.S. higher education, he was motivated primarily by Transcendentalist and Unitarian convictions influenced by William Ellery Channing, Ralph Waldo Emerson, and others, rather than secularism. In the late 19th century, Harvard University's graduate schools began admitting women in small numbers.

=== 20th century ===
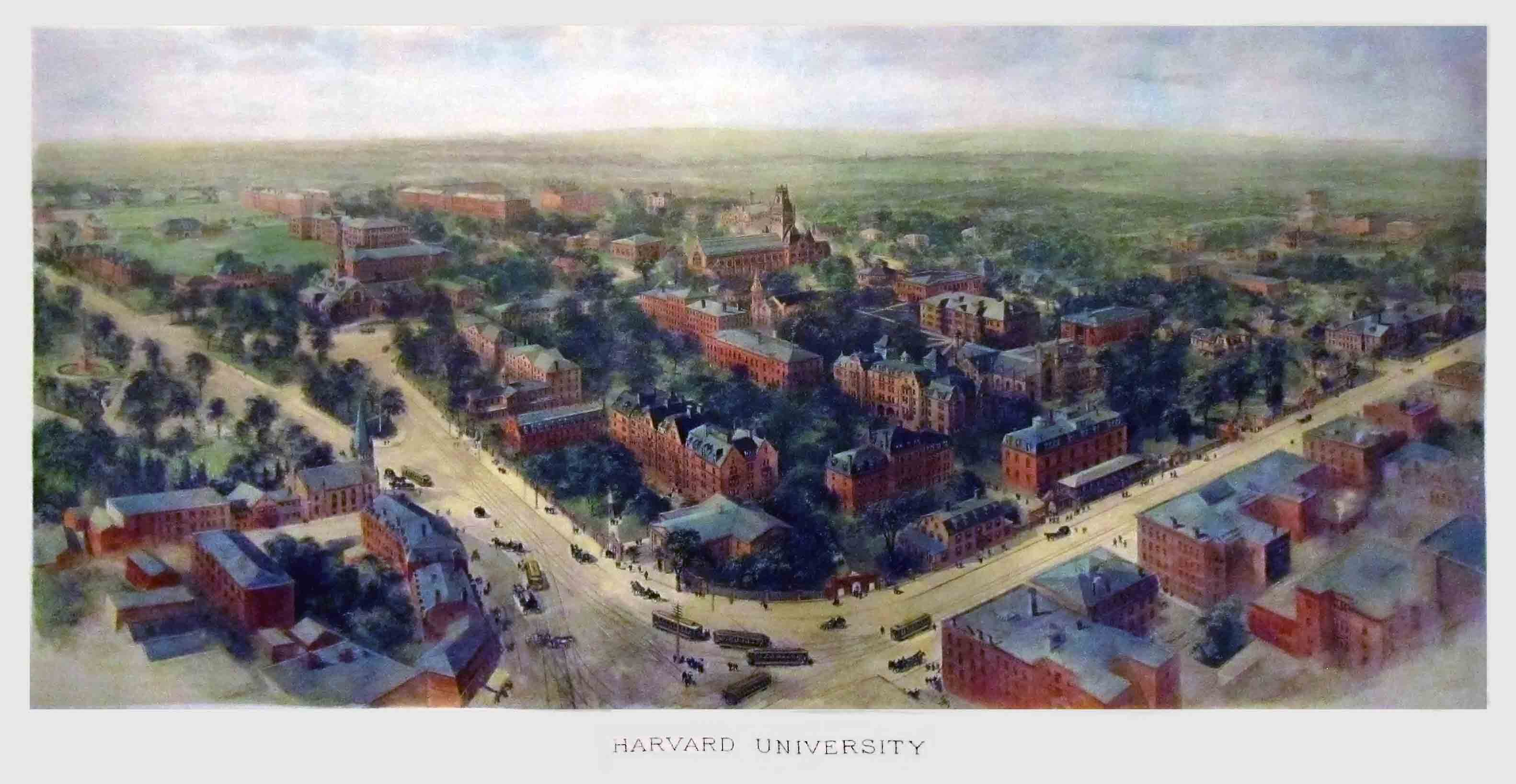
A 1906 aerial watercolor portrait of Harvard University

In 1900, Harvard became a founding member of the Association of American Universities. For the first few decades of the 20th century, the Harvard student body was predominantly "old-stock, high-status Protestants, especially Episcopalians, Congregationalists, and Presbyterians," according to sociologist and author Jerome Karabel.

Over the 20th century, as its endowment burgeoned and prominent intellectuals and professors affiliated with it, Harvard University's reputation as one of the world's most prestigious universities grew notably. The university's enrollment also underwent substantial growth, a product of both the founding of new graduate academic programs and an expansion of the undergraduate college. Radcliffe College emerged as the female counterpart of Harvard College, becoming one of the most prominent schools in the nation for women.

In 1923, a year after the proportion of Jewish students at Harvard reached 20%, A. Lawrence Lowell, the university's 22nd president, unsuccessfully proposed capping the admission of Jewish students to 15% of the undergraduate population. Lowell also refused to mandate forced desegregation in the university's freshman dormitories, writing that, "We owe to the colored man the same opportunities for education that we do to the white man, but we do not owe to him to force him and the white into social relations that are not, or may not be, mutually congenial."

Between 1933 and 1953, Harvard University was led by James B. Conant, the university's 23rd president, who reinvigorated the university's creative scholarship in an effort to guarantee Harvard's preeminence among the nation and world's emerging research institutions. Conant viewed higher education as a vehicle of opportunity for the talented rather than an entitlement for the wealthy, and devised programs to identify, recruit, and support talented youth. In 1945, under Conant's leadership, an influential 268-page report, General Education in a Free Society, was published by Harvard faculty, which remains one of the most important works in curriculum studies, and women were first admitted to the medical school.

Between 1945 and 1960, admissions were standardized to open the university to a more diverse group of students. Following the end of World War II, for example, special exams were developed so veterans could be considered for admission. No longer drawing mostly from prestigious prep schools in New England, the undergraduate college became accessible to striving middle class students from public schools; many more Jews and Catholics were admitted, but Blacks, Hispanics, and Asians remained underrepresented. Over the second half of the 20th century, however, the university became incrementally more diverse.

Between 1971 and 1999, Harvard controlled undergraduate admission, instruction, and housing for Radcliffe's women; in 1999, Radcliffe was formally merged into Harvard University.

=== 21st century ===
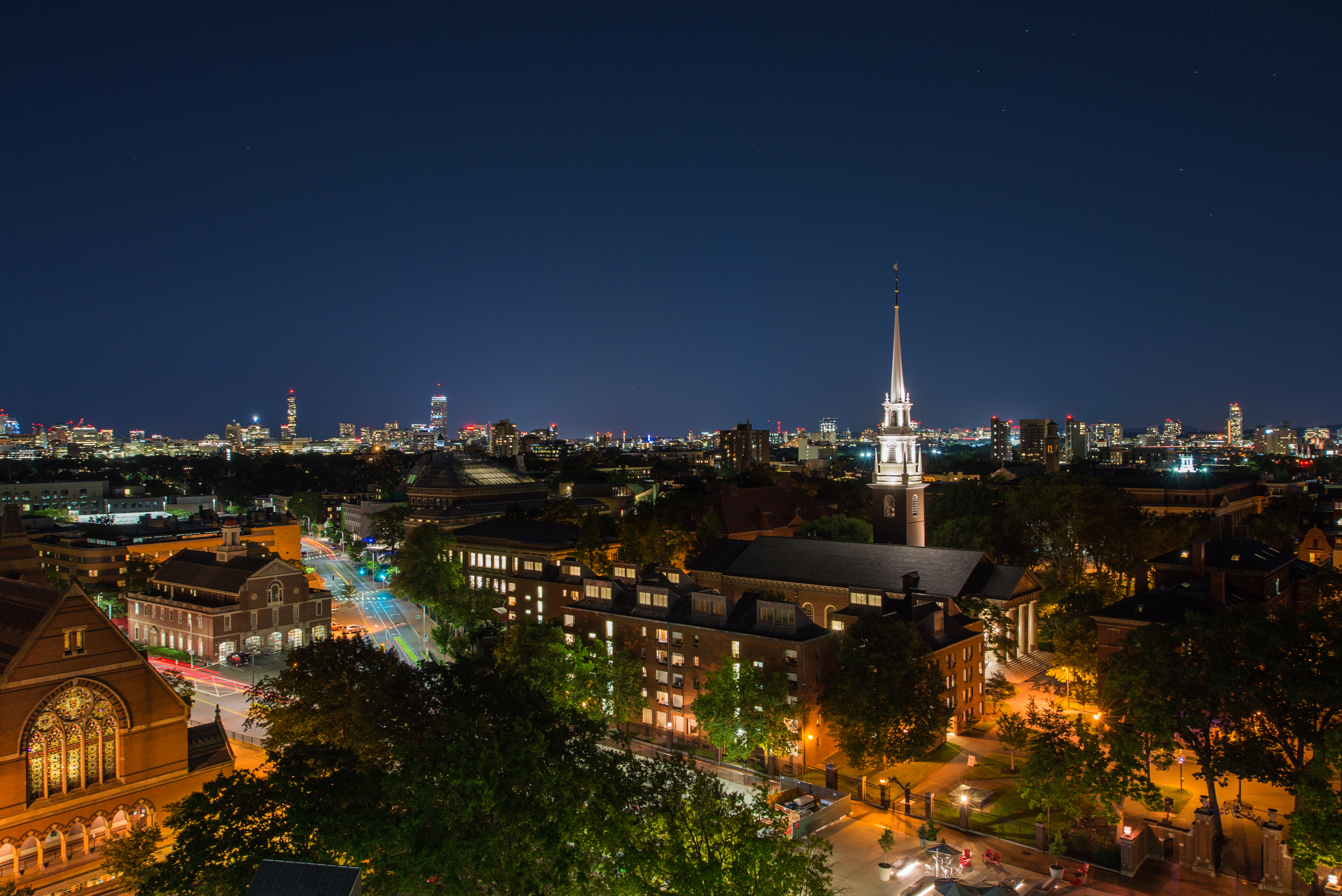
An aerial view of Harvard University at night in 2017

On July 1, 2007, Drew Gilpin Faust, dean of Harvard Radcliffe Institute, was appointed Harvard's 28th and the university's first female president. On July 1, 2018, Faust retired and joined the board of Goldman Sachs, and Lawrence Bacow became Harvard's 29th president.

In February 2023, approximately 6,000 Harvard workers attempted to organize a union.

Bacow retired in June 2023, and on July 1 Claudine Gay, a Harvard professor in the Government and African American Studies departments and dean of the Faculty of Arts and Sciences, became Harvard's 30th president. In January 2024, just six months into her presidency, Gay resigned following allegations of antisemitism and plagiarism. Gay was succeeded by Alan Garber, the university's provost, who was appointed interim president. In August 2024, the university announced that Garber would be appointed Harvard's 31st president through the end of the 2026–27 academic year.

==== Second presidency of Donald Trump ====
In February 2025, Leo Terrell, the head of the Trump administration's Task Force to Combat Antisemitism, announced that he would investigate Harvard University as part of the Department of Justice's broader investigation into antisemitism on college campuses.

In April 2025, the United States federal government under President Donald Trump threatened to withhold nearly $9 billion in government funds from the university unless the university complied with government demands to modify many of its policies. This threat was part of a broader battle over universities' autonomy following contentious student protests against the Gaza war, and followed similar demands made of Columbia University. The university's leadership resisted the government's demands, claiming that they were an unlawful overreach of government authority. In response, the US Department of Education announced they were freezing $2.3 billion in federal funds to Harvard. The Department of Homeland Security subsequently threatened to revoke Harvard's eligibility to host international students. Harvard responded by filing a lawsuit against the Trump administration in the District Court of Massachusetts, arguing that the freezing of funds was unconstitutional.

In May 2025, education secretary Linda McMahon informed Harvard president Garber that the federal government would no longer provide grant funding until the university complied with the Trump administration's demands. The following week, the Trump administration cut an additional $450 million in grants to the school.

Decertification Letter sent by Kristi Noem on May 22, 2025

Later that same month, Department of Homeland Security secretary Kristi Noem announced that Harvard's Student and Exchange Visitor Program certification had been revoked, barring Harvard from hosting international students. The following day, Harvard sued the Trump administration for banning them from enrolling international students and U.S. District Judge Allison Burroughs granted a temporary restraining order stopping the ban. On June 16, 2025, Burroughs postponed a ruling after hearing arguments from lawyers on both sides, leaving the temporary block in place for another week.

On May 30, 2025, the State Department ordered all US embassies and consulates to conduct "comprehensive and thorough vetting" of the online presence of anyone seeking to visit Harvard from abroad.

On June 4, 2025, Trump issued a proclamation restricting international students from studying at Harvard, and directing the State Department to consider revoking the visas of current international students studying at that university. The following day, Harvard filed a legal challenge, amending their existing federal complaint against the administration.

On June 20, Harvard was granted an injunction allowing it to continue hosting international students as litigation continues. On June 30, a Trump administration investigation found Harvard violated federal civil rights law by failing to protect Jewish students, faculty, and staff.

On September 3, 2025 US District Judge Allison Burroughs ruled the Trump administration illegally froze more than $2 billion in research funding stating the administration "...violated Harvard's free-speech rights as well as the US Civil Rights Act."

In February 2026, Trump announced that his administration would seek $1 billion in damages from Harvard. In a post on Truth Social, Trump accused Harvard of supplying misleading information to The New York Times. Administration officials claimed that the university failed to adequately address antisemitism during pro-Palestinian protests, a claim Harvard has denied.

On February 6, Secretary of Defense Pete Hegseth announced that the Pentagon would start to sever ties to Harvard with its graduate-level military training courses. Hegseth accused Harvard of becoming a "factory for woke ideology and a breeding ground for anti-American radicals..." as a reason for discontinuing the programs. A week later, Harvard along with other prestigious American Universities was listed as "Moderate to High Risk" in a Department of Defense memo for Assisted Military Tuition, and could be barred for service members for tuition assistance.

== Campuses ==
=== Cambridge ===
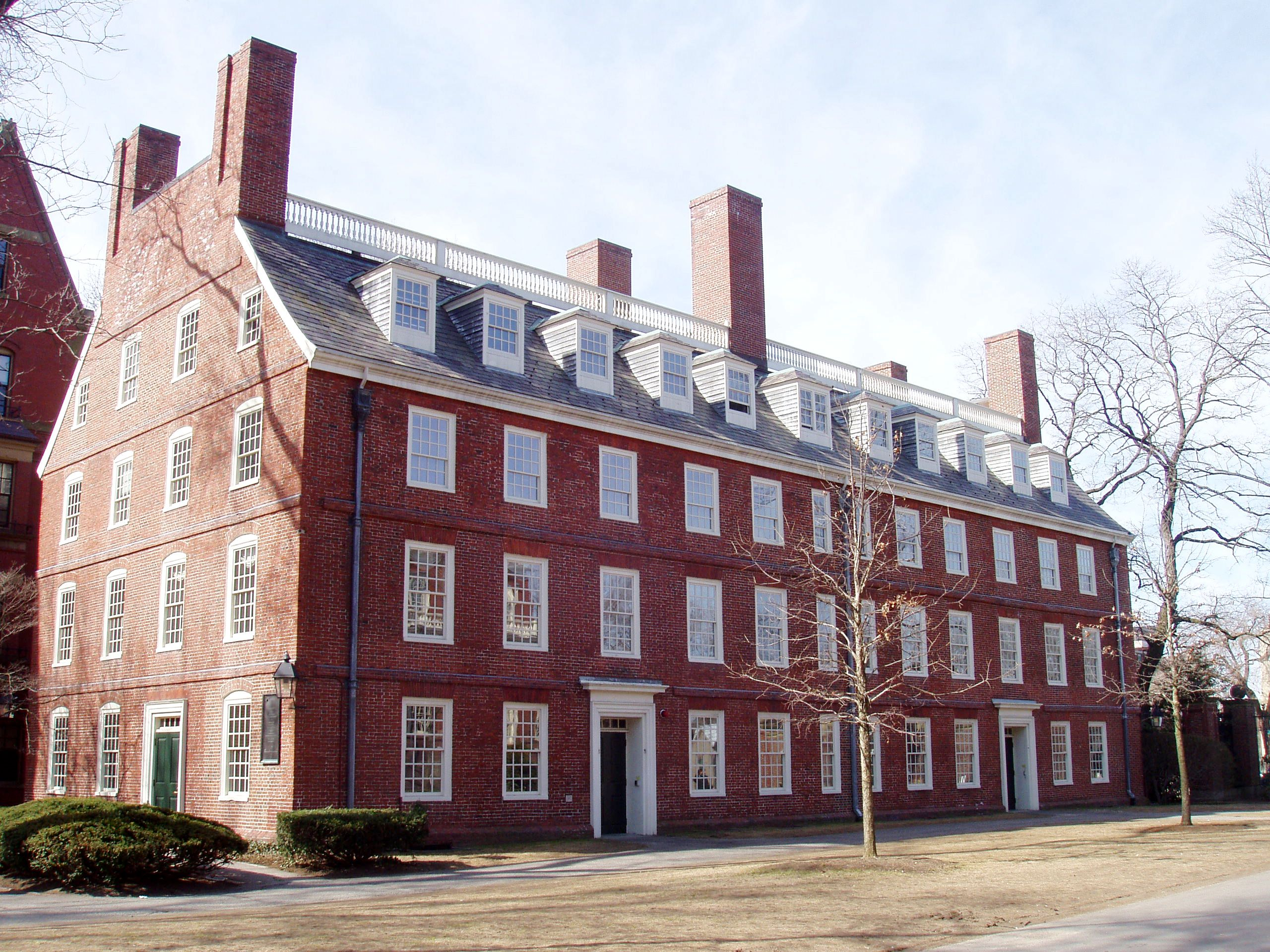
Massachusetts Hall, Harvard's oldest building, constructed in 1720

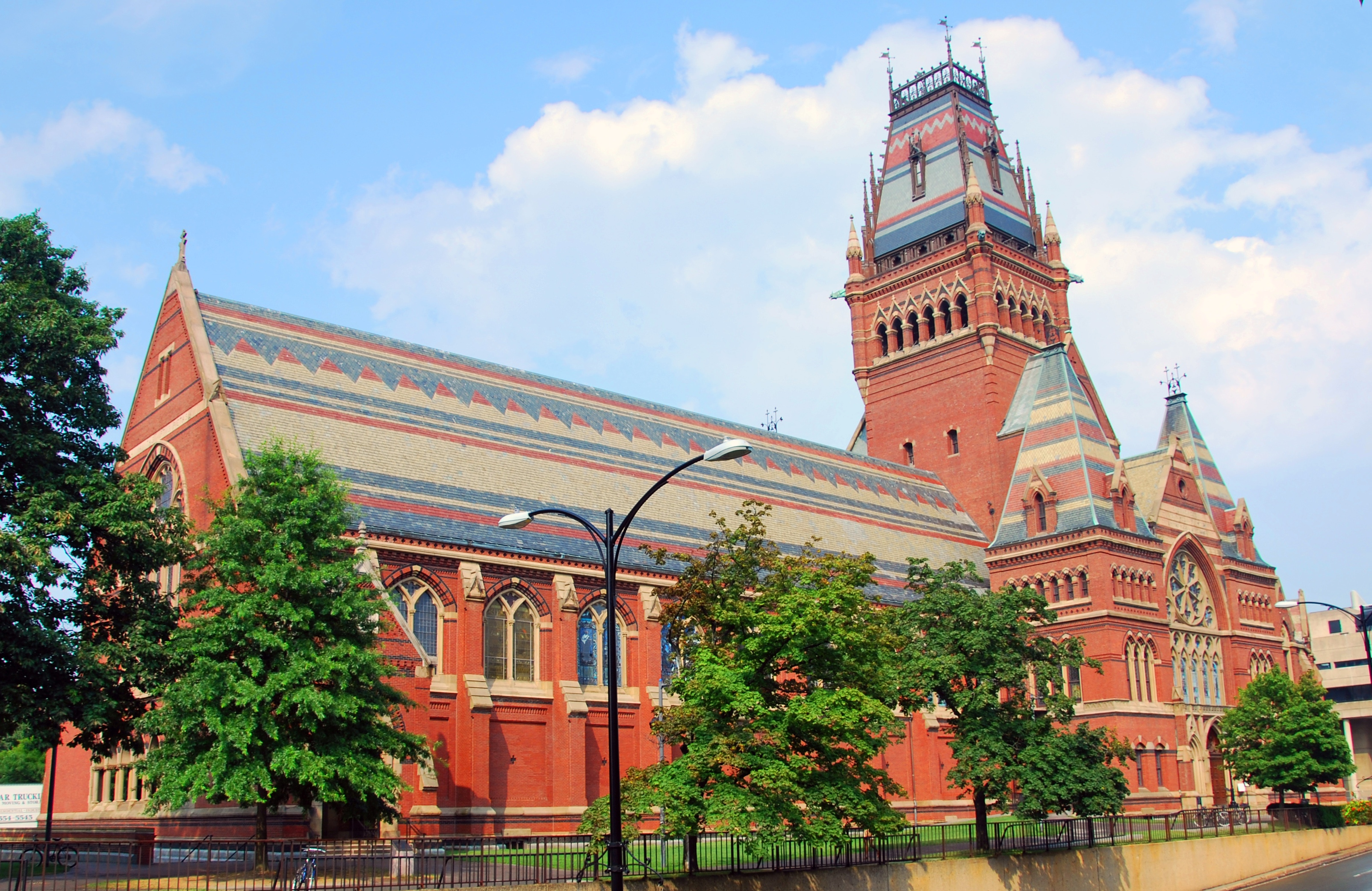
Memorial Hall, built on the main Cambridge campus in 1870

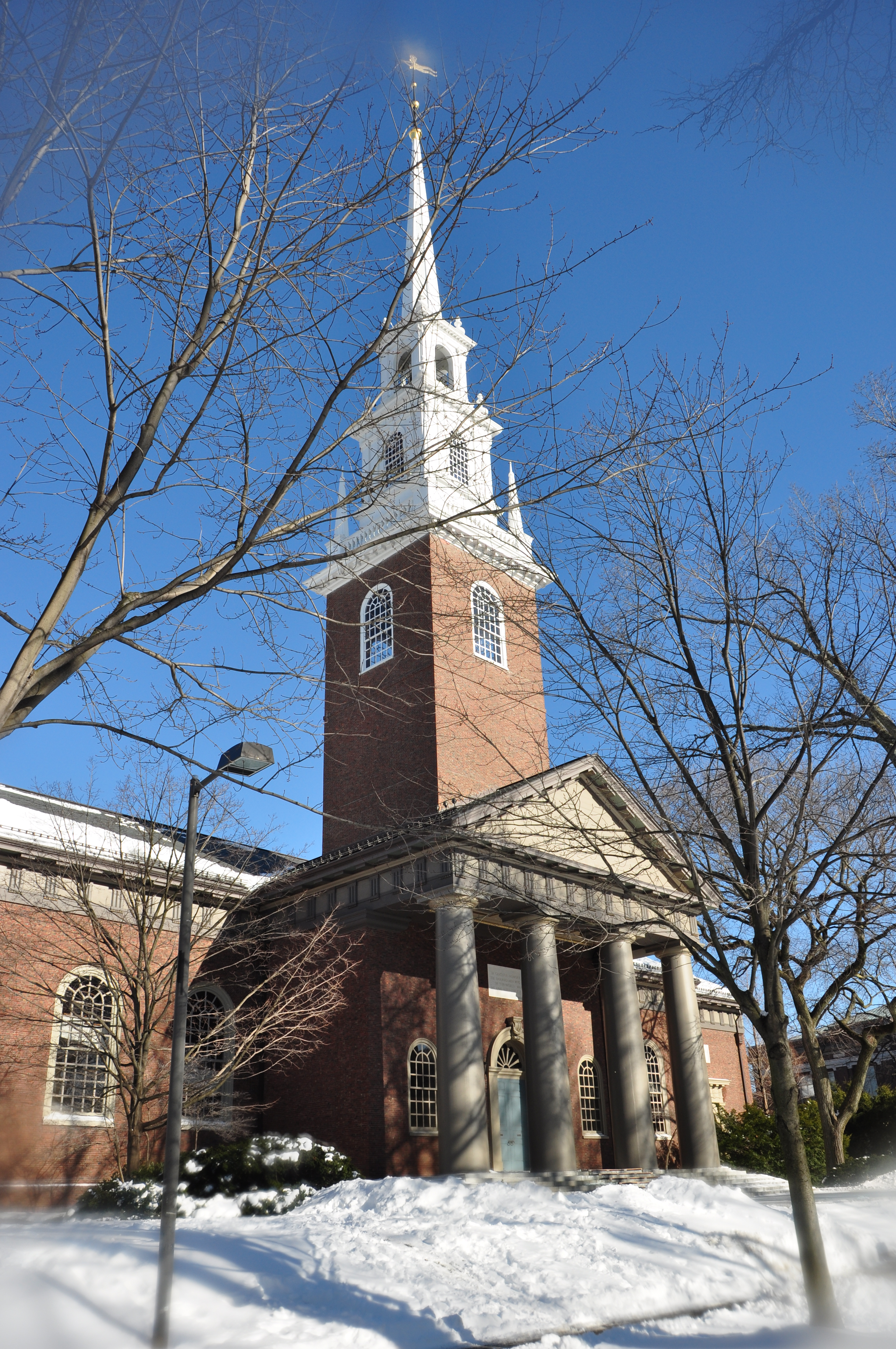
Memorial Church, dedicated and opened in 1932 on Harvard Yard

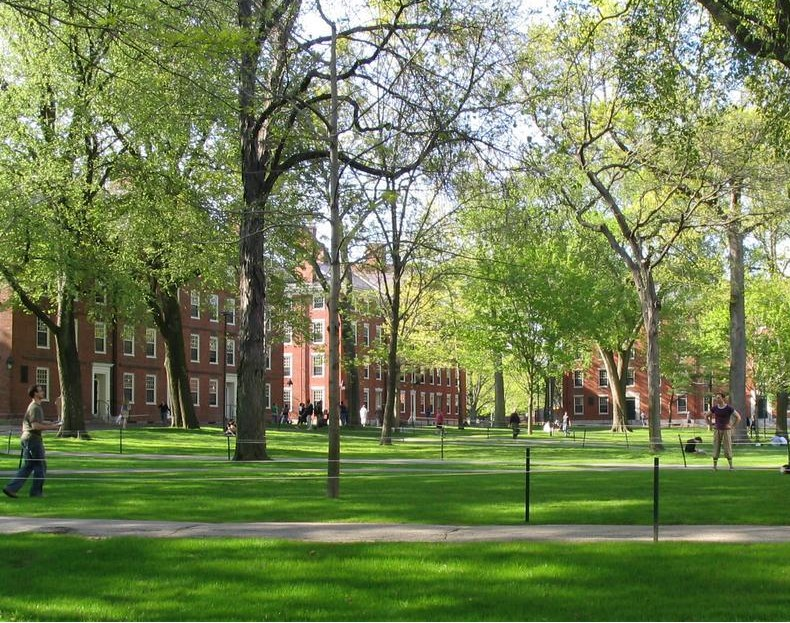
Harvard Yard at the center of Harvard's main campus in Cambridge

The 209-acre (85 ha) main campus of Harvard University is centered on Harvard Yard, colloquially known as "the Yard", in Cambridge, Massachusetts, about three miles (five km) west-northwest of downtown Boston, and extending to the surrounding Harvard Square neighborhood. The Yard houses several Harvard buildings, including four of the university's libraries, Houghton, Lamont, Pusey, and Widener. Also on Harvard Yard are Massachusetts Hall, built between 1718 and 1720 and the university's oldest still standing building, Memorial Church, and University Hall.

Harvard Yard and adjacent areas include the main academic buildings of the Faculty of Arts and Sciences, including Sever Hall, Harvard Hall, and freshman dormitories. Upperclassmen live in the twelve residential houses: nine south of Harvard Yard near the Charles River, and three on the Radcliffe Quadrangle, which formerly housed Radcliffe College students. Each house is a community of undergraduates, faculty deans, and resident tutors, with its own dining hall, library, and recreational facilities.

Also on the main campus in Cambridge are the Law, Divinity (theology), Engineering and Applied Science, Design (architecture), Education, Kennedy (public policy), and Extension schools, and Harvard Radcliffe Institute in Radcliffe Yard. Harvard also has commercial real estate holdings in Cambridge.

=== Allston ===
Harvard Business School, Harvard Innovation Labs, and many athletics facilities, including Harvard Stadium, are located on a 358-acre (145 ha) campus in the Allston section of Boston across the John W. Weeks Bridge, which crosses the Charles River and connects the Allston and Cambridge campuses.

The university is actively expanding into Allston, where it now owns more land than in Cambridge. Plans include new construction and renovation for the Business School, a hotel and conference center, graduate student housing, Harvard Stadium, and other athletics facilities.

In 2021, the Harvard John A. Paulson School of Engineering and Applied Sciences expanded into the new Allston-based Science and Engineering Complex (SEC), which is more than 500,000 square feet in size. SEC is adjacent to the Enterprise Research Campus, the Business School, and Harvard Innovation Labs, and designed to encourage technology- and life science-focused startups and collaborations with mature companies.

=== Longwood ===
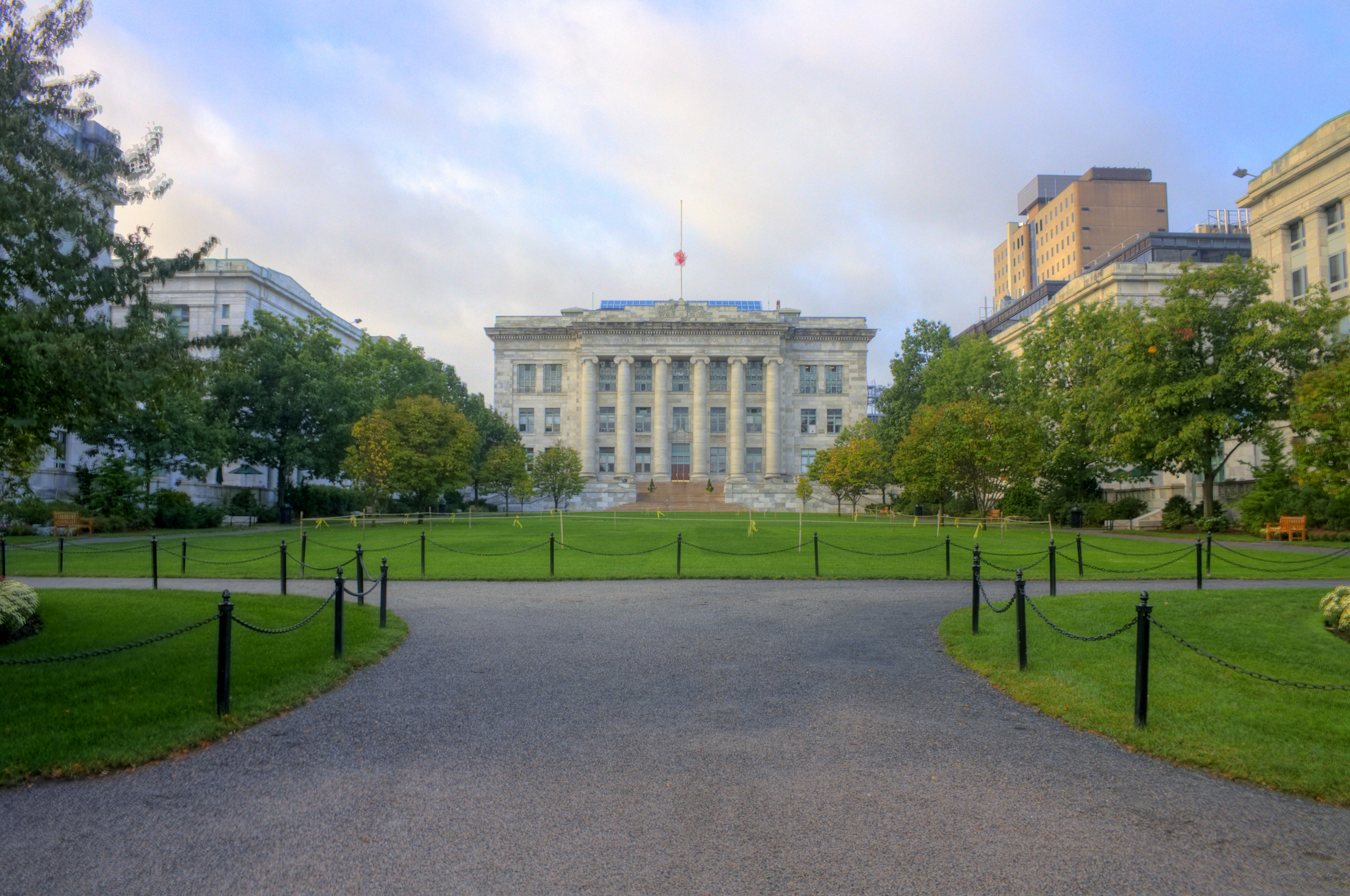
Harvard Medical School in the Longwood Medical and Academic Area in Boston

The university's schools of Medicine, Dental Medicine, and Public Health are located on a 21-acre (8.5 ha) campus in the Longwood Medical and Academic Area in Boston, about 3.3 miles (5.3 km) south of the Cambridge campus.

Several Harvard-affiliated hospitals and research institutes are also in Longwood, including Beth Israel Deaconess Medical Center, Boston Children's Hospital, Brigham and Women's Hospital, Dana–Farber Cancer Institute, Joslin Diabetes Center, and the Wyss Institute for Biologically Inspired Engineering. Additional affiliates, including Massachusetts General Hospital, are located throughout Greater Boston.

=== Other ===
Harvard owns: Dumbarton Oaks, a research library in Washington, D.C.; Harvard Forest in Petersham, Massachusetts; Concord Field Station in Estabrook Woods in Concord, Massachusetts; the Villa I Tatti research center in Florence, Italy; the Center for Hellenic Studies in Greece; the Harvard Shanghai Center in Shanghai, China; and Arnold Arboretum in the Jamaica Plain neighborhood of Boston.

== Organization and administration ==
=== Governance ===
Harvard is governed by a combination of its Board of Overseers and the President and Fellows of Harvard College, which is also known as the Harvard Corporation. These two bodies, in turn, appoint the president of Harvard University.

There are 16,000 staff and faculty, including 2,400 professors, lecturers, and instructors in the colleges proper, plus another >10,400 academic appointments in affiliated teaching hospitals

As of 2025, Harvard differs radically from its peer universities in two important ways. First, Harvard does not make its governing statutes publicly available, meaning that members of the Harvard community interested in reform must first persuade the university to give them a copy of those documents. Second, Harvard does not have an academic senate like most of its peers, although it is currently attempting to create one.

=== Endowment ===
Harvard has the largest university endowment in the world, valued at about $50.7 billion as of 2023.

During the recession of 2007–2009, it suffered significant losses that forced large budget cuts, in particular temporarily halting construction on the Allston Science Complex. The endowment has since recovered.

About $2 billion of investment income is annually distributed to fund operations. Harvard's ability to fund its degree and financial aid programs depends on the performance of its endowment; a poor performance in fiscal year 2016 forced a 4.4% cut in the number of graduate students funded by the Faculty of Arts and Sciences. Endowment income is critical, as only 22% of revenue is from students' tuition, fees, room, and board.

==== Divestment ====
Since the 1970s, several student-led campaigns have advocated divesting Harvard's endowment from controversial holdings, including investments in South Africa during apartheid, Sudan during the Darfur genocide, and tobacco, fossil fuel, and private prison industries.

In the late 1980s, during the disinvestment from South Africa movement, student activists erected a symbolic shanty town on Harvard Yard and blockaded a speech by South African Vice Consul Duke Kent-Brown.

In response to pressure, the university eventually reduced its South African holdings by $230 million out of a total of $400 million between 1986 and 1987.

== Academics ==
=== Teaching and learning ===
School	Founded
Harvard College	1636
Medicine	1782
Divinity	1816
Law	1817
Engineering	1847
Dental Medicine	1867
Graduate Arts and Sciences	1872
Business	1908
Extension	1910
Public Health	1913
Education	1920
Design	1936
Government	1936

Harvard is a large, highly residential research university offering 50 undergraduate majors, 134 graduate degrees, and 32 professional degrees. During the 2018–2019 academic year, Harvard granted 1,665 baccalaureate degrees, 1,013 graduate degrees, and 5,695 professional degrees.

The Faculty of Arts and Sciences, with an academic staff of 1,211 as of 2019, is the largest Harvard faculty, and has primary responsibility for instruction in Harvard College, the Graduate School of Arts and Sciences, the John A. Paulson School of Engineering and Applied Sciences (SEAS), and the Division of Continuing Education, which includes Harvard Summer School and Harvard Extension School. There are nine other graduate and professional faculties and a faculty attached to the Harvard Radcliffe Institute.

There are four Harvard joint programs with MIT, which include the Harvard–MIT Program in Health Sciences and Technology, the Broad Institute, The Observatory of Economic Complexity, and edX.

=== Colleges and professional schools ===
The university maintains 13 schools, which include:

School	Founded	Enrollment
Harvard College, the undergraduate college	1636	7,000–7,500
Medicine	1782	2,700 (M.D. and Ph.D.), 4,400 (clinical residents and fellows), 5,100 (research fellows)
Divinity	1816	377
Law	1817	1,990
Dental Medicine	1867	280
Graduate Arts and Sciences	1872	4,824
Business	1908	2,011
Extension	1910	3,428
Design	1914	878
Education	1920	876
Public Health	1922	1,412
Government	1936	1,100
Engineering	2007	1,750 (including undergraduates)

=== Harvard College ===
Harvard College, the four-year, full-time undergraduate program, has a liberal arts and sciences focus. To graduate in the usual four years, undergraduates normally take 16 credit hours (usually across four courses) per semester for a total of 128 credit hours. In most majors, an honors degree requires advanced coursework and a senior thesis.

Though some introductory courses have large enrollments, the median class size is 12 students.

=== Harvard Medical School ===
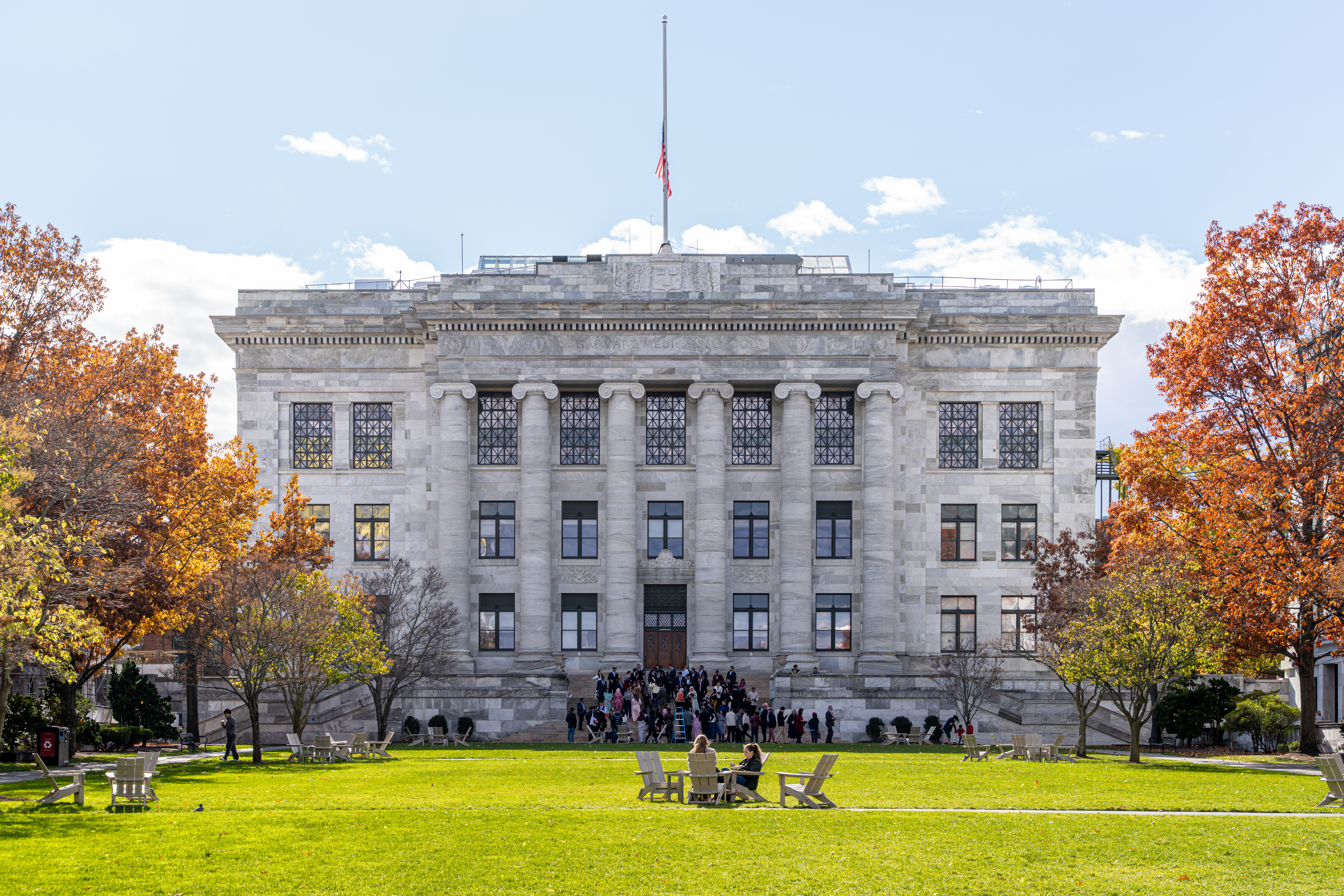
Harvard Medical School

Harvard Medical School, the third-oldest medical school in the United States, was founded in 1782 as Massachusetts Medical College by John Warren, Benjamin Waterhouse, and Aaron Dexter. In 1810, Harvard Medical School relocated from Cambridge to Boston. The medical school was tied to the rest of the university "only by the tenuous thread of degrees", but its strong faculty gave it a national reputation by the early 19th century.

The medical school moved to its current location on Longwood Avenue in 1906, where the "Great White Quadrangle" or HMS Quad with its five white marble buildings was established.

Harvard Medical School's reputation continued to grow into the 20th century, especially in terms of scientific research and support from regional and national elites. Fifteen scientists won the Nobel Prize for work done at the Medical School. Its four major flagship teaching hospitals are Beth Israel Deaconess Medical Center, Brigham and Women's Hospital, Boston Children's Hospital and Massachusetts General Hospital.

=== Harvard Law School ===
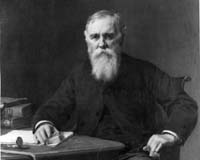
Christopher Columbus Langdell, an influential dean of Harvard Law School from 1875 to 1890

The establishment of Harvard Law School in 1817 was made possible by a 1779 bequest from Isaac Royall Jr.; it is the oldest continuously operating law school in the nation. It was a small operation and grew slowly. By 1827, it was down to one faculty member. Nathan Dane, a prominent alumnus, endowed the Dane Professorship of Law and insisted that it be given to then Supreme Court Justice Joseph Story. For a while, the school was called Dane Law School. Story's belief in the need for an elite law school based on merit and dedicated to public service helped build the school's reputation at the time. Enrollment remained low as academic legal education was considered to be of little added benefit to apprenticeships in legal practice.

Radical reform came in the 1870s, under Dean Christopher Columbus Langdell (1826–1906). Its new curriculum set the national standard and was copied widely in the United States. Langdell developed the case method of teaching law, based on his belief that law could be studied as a "science" gave university legal education a reason for being distinct from vocational preparation. The school introduced a first-year curriculum that was widely imitated, based on classes in contracts, property, torts, criminal law and civil procedure.

Critics bemoaned abandonment of the more traditional lecture method, because of its efficiency and the lower workloads it placed on faculty and students. Advocates of the case method had a sounder theoretical basis in scientific research and the inductive method. Langdell's graduates became leading professors at other law schools where they introduced the case method. From its founding in 1900, the Association of American Law Schools promoted the case method in law schools that sought accreditation.

=== Harvard Graduate School of Arts and Science ===
As the college modernized in the late 19th century, the faculty was organized into departments and began to add graduate programs, including the PhD. Charles William Eliot, president from 1869 to 1909, was a chemist who had spent two years in Germany studying at their universities. Thousands of Americans, mostly Harvard and Yale alumni, had attended German universities, especially Berlin and Göttingen. Eliot used the German model to set up graduate programs at Harvard and he formed a graduate department in 1872, which granted its first Ph.D. degrees in 1873 to William Byerly in mathematics and Charles Whitney in history. Eliot set up the Graduate School of Arts and Sciences with its own dean and budget in 1890, which dealt with graduate students and funded research programs.

By 2004, there were 3,200 graduate students in 53 separate programs and forty former or current professors had won a Nobel Prize, most of them scientists or economists based in the Graduate School of Arts and Sciences.

=== Harvard Business School ===
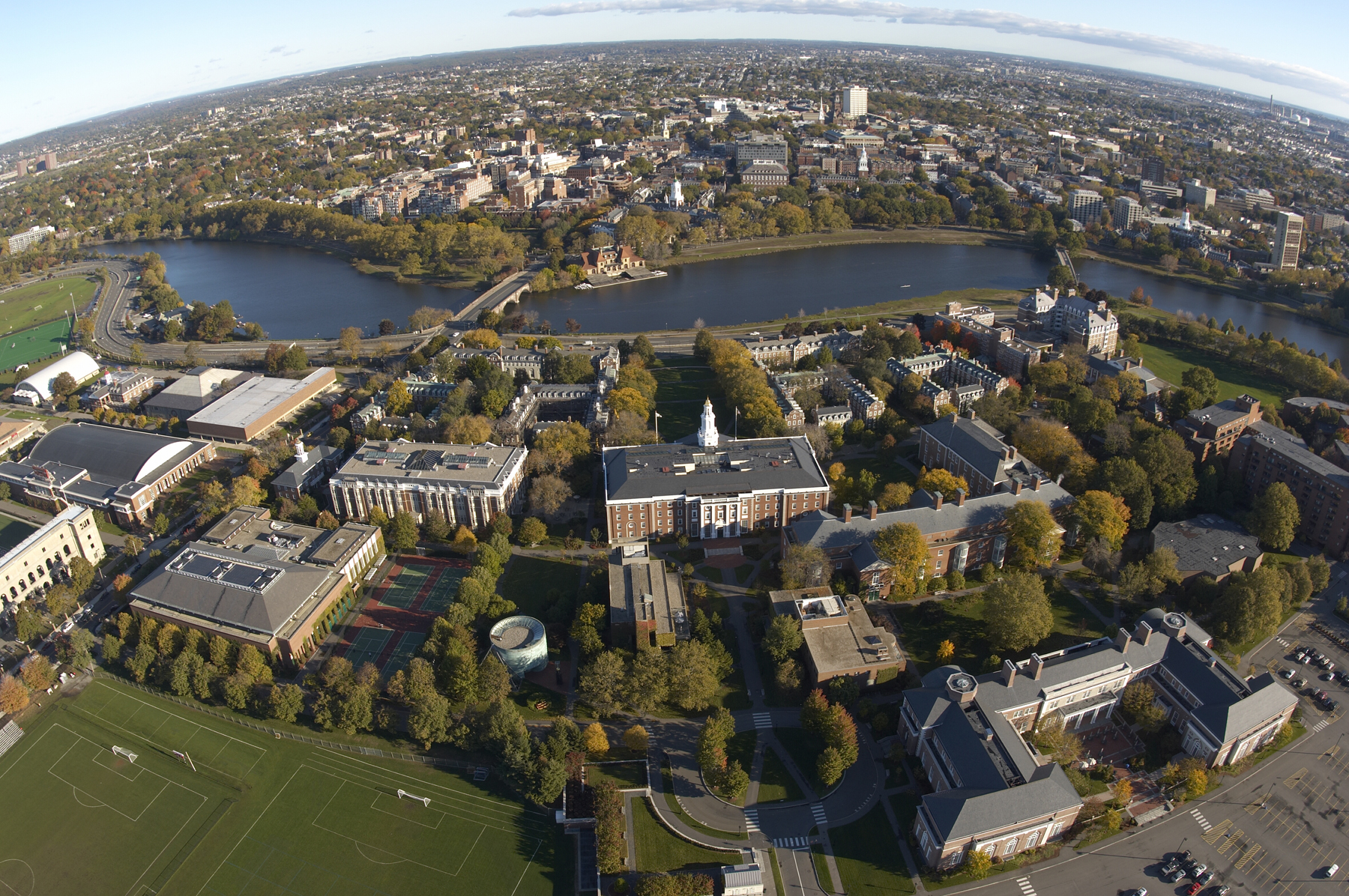
Aerial view of Harvard Business School

From its founding in 1908, Harvard Business School has had a close relationship with the corporate world. Within a few years of its founding, many business leaders were its alumni and were hiring other alumni for starting positions in their firms. The school used Rockefeller funding in the 1920s to launch a major research program under Elton Mayo (1926–1947) for his "Harvard human relations group". Its findings revolutionized human relations in business and raised the reputation of the Business School from its initial "low status as a trainer of money grabbers into a high prestige educator of socially-conscientious administrators". Starting in 1935, the school began weekend and short-term leadership training workshops for executives of major corporations that further expanded its national role.

By 1949, nearly half of all the holders of the MBA degree in the U.S. were alumni of Harvard Business School, and it was considered "the most influential graduate school of business".

=== Harvard T.H. Chan School of Public Health ===
The Harvard T.H. Chan School of Public Health is the public health school of Harvard University, located in the Longwood Medical Area of Boston. The school grew out of the Harvard-MIT School for Health Officers, the nation's first graduate training program in population health, which was founded in 1913 and then became the Harvard School of Public Health in 1922.

The school was part of Harvard Medical School until 1946, when it became a fully autonomous institution with its own dedicated public health and medical faculty. It was renamed the Harvard T.H. Chan School of Public Health in 2014 in honor of a $350 million donation from the Morningside Foundation.

=== Harvard Kennedy School ===
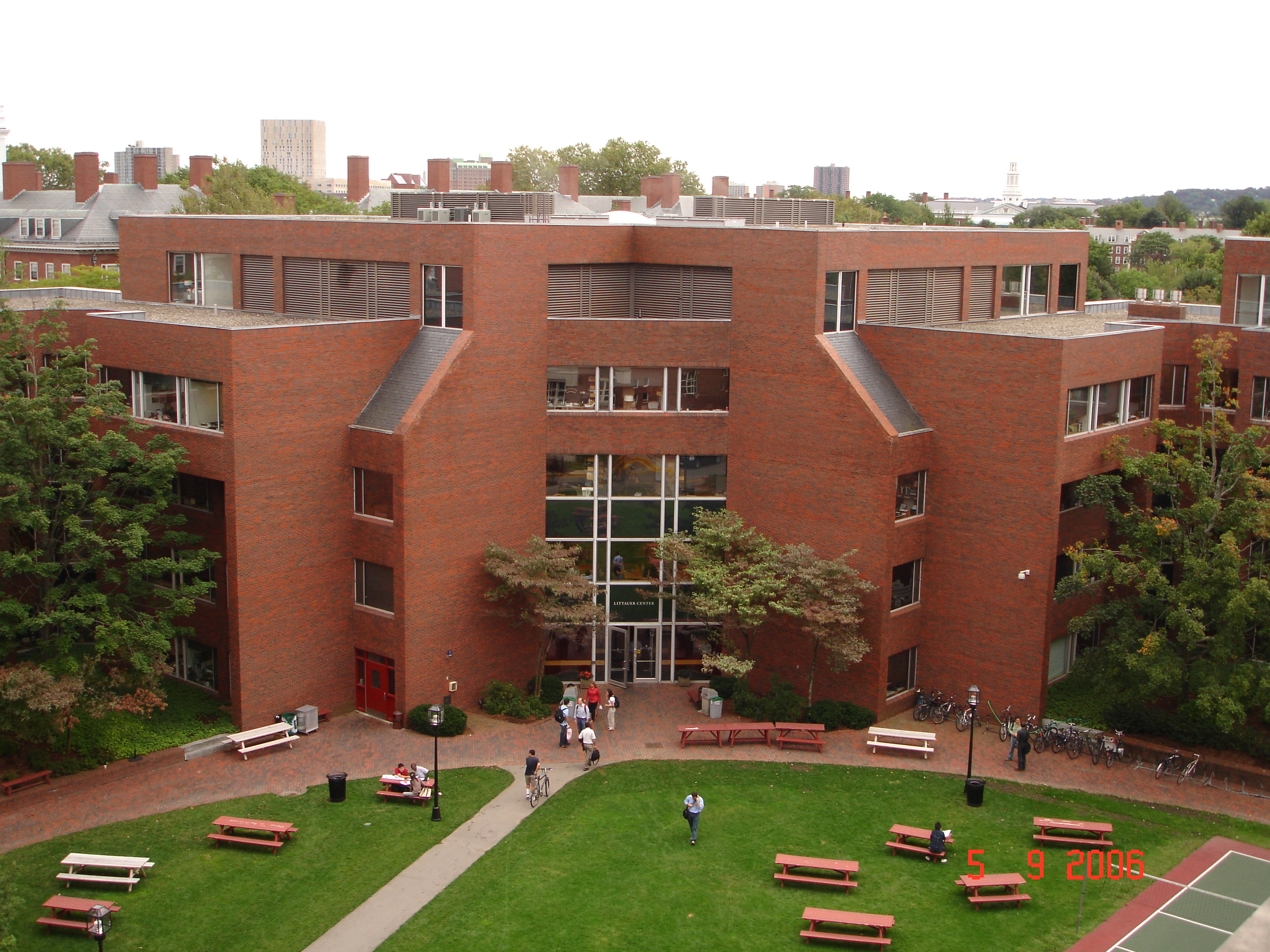
The Littauer Building at Harvard Kennedy School

In 1936, Harvard University founded the Harvard Graduate School of Public Administration, later renamed Harvard Kennedy School in honor of former U.S. President and 1940 Harvard College alumnus John F. Kennedy. The Kennedy School has an endowment of $1.7 billion as of 2021 and is routinely ranked at the top of the world's graduate schools in public policy, social policy, international affairs, and government. Its alumni include 17 heads of state or government.

=== Research ===
Harvard is a founding member of the Association of American Universities and a preeminent research university with "very high" research activity (R1) and comprehensive doctoral programs across the arts, sciences, engineering, and medicine, according to the Carnegie Classification.

The medical school consistently ranks first among medical schools for research, and biomedical research is an area of particular strength for the university. More than 11,000 faculty and 1,600 graduate students conduct research at the medical school and its 15 affiliated hospitals and research institutes. In 2019, the medical school and its affiliates attracted $1.65 billion in competitive research grants from the National Institutes of Health, more than twice that of any other university.

=== Libraries ===
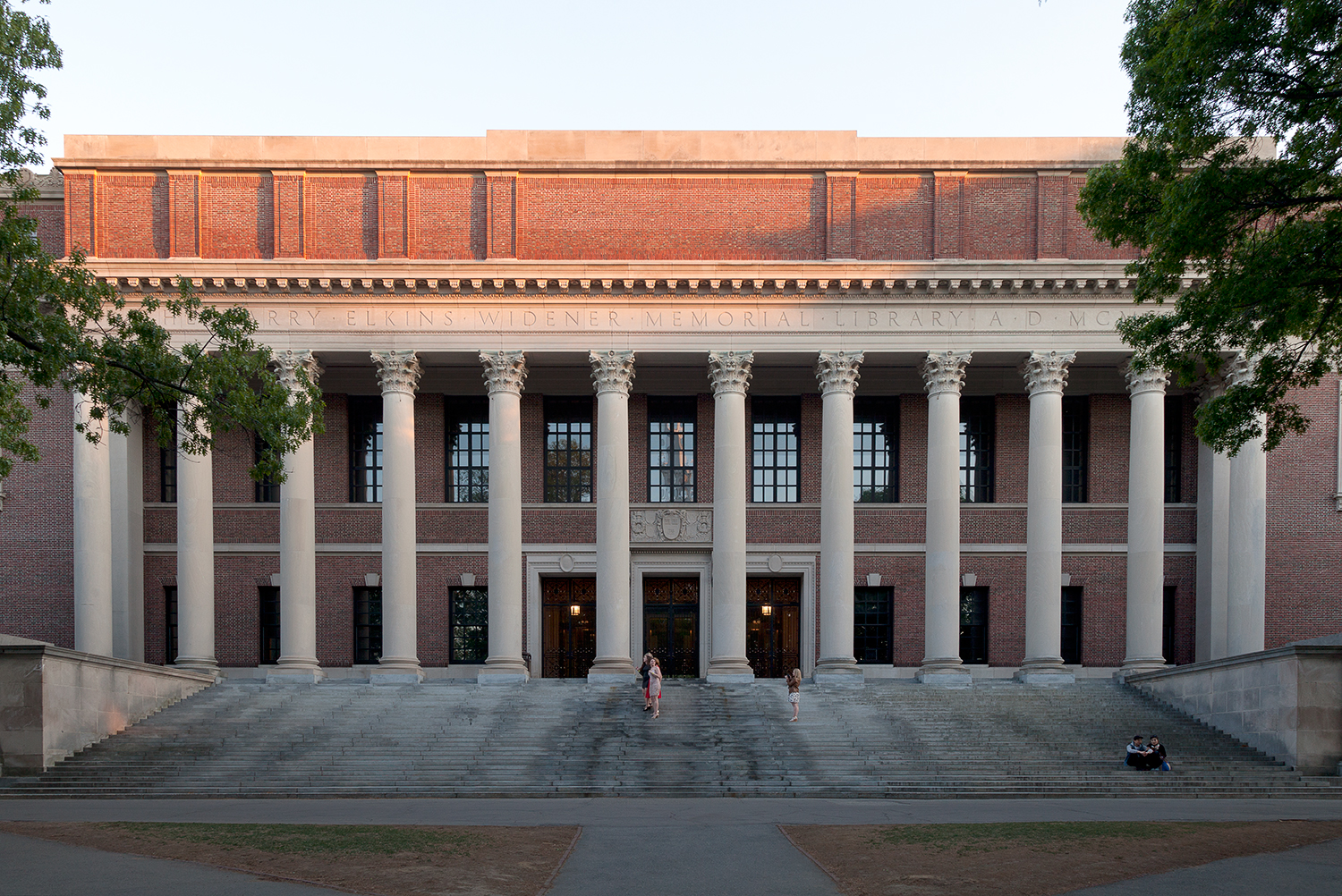
Widener Library, the anchor of Harvard Library, the largest academic library in the world with more than 20 million holdings

Harvard Library, the largest academic library in the world with 20.4 million holdings, is centered in Widener Library in Harvard Yard. It includes 25 individual Harvard libraries around the world with a combined staff of more than 800 librarians and personnel.

Houghton Library, the Arthur and Elizabeth Schlesinger Library on the History of Women in America, and the Harvard University Archives consist principally of rare and unique materials. The nation's oldest collection of maps, gazetteers, and atlases is stored in Pusey Library on Harvard Yard, which is open to the public. The largest collection of East-Asian language material outside of East Asia is held in Harvard-Yenching Library.

Other major libraries in the Harvard Library system include Baker Library/Bloomberg Center at Harvard Business School, Cabot Science Library at Harvard Science Center, Dumbarton Oaks in Washington, D.C., Gutman Library at the Harvard Graduate School of Education, Harvard Film Archive at the Carpenter Center for the Visual Arts, Houghton Library, and Lamont Library.

=== Museums ===
Harvard Art Museums include three museums: the Arthur M. Sackler Museum covers Asian, Mediterranean, and Islamic art; the Busch–Reisinger Museum (formerly the Germanic Museum) covers central and northern European art; and the Fogg Museum covers Western art from the Middle Ages to the present, emphasizing Italian early Renaissance, British pre-Raphaelite, and 19th-century French art.

Harvard Museums of Science and Culture include the Harvard Museum of Natural History, which itself includes the Harvard Mineralogical and Geological Museum, the Harvard University Herbaria featuring the Blaschka Glass Flowers exhibit, and the Museum of Comparative Zoology. Others include the Harvard Collection of Historical Scientific Instruments at Harvard Science Center, the Harvard Museum of the Ancient Near East featuring artifacts from excavations in the Middle East, and the Peabody Museum of Archaeology and Ethnology, specializing in the cultural history and civilizations of the Western Hemisphere, the Carpenter Center for the Visual Arts, designed by Le Corbusier and housing the Harvard Film Archive, the Warren Anatomical Museum at Harvard Medical School's Center for the History of Medicine, and the Ethelbert Cooper Gallery of African & African American Art at the Hutchins Center for African and African American Research.

=== Reputation and rankings ===
Academic rankings

National
- Forbes: 8
- U.S. News & World Report: 3
- Washington Monthly: 1
- WSJ/College Pulse: 6

Global
- ARWU: 1
- QS: 5
- THE: 5
- U.S. News & World Report: 1

Harvard University is accredited by the New England Commission of Higher Education. Since its founding in 2003, the Academic Ranking of World Universities has ranked Harvard first in each of its annual rankings of the world's colleges and universities. Similarly, the Times Higher Education–QS World University Rankings, which was published from 2004 to 2009, ranked Harvard first in the world in each of its annual rankings. Since then, Harvard has been ranked in the top ten in the world each year since 2011 by its successor, the Times Higher Education World University Rankings, and first each year by THE's World Reputation Rankings.

Harvard was also ranked in the first tier of American research universities, along with Columbia, MIT, and Stanford, in the 2023 report from the Center for Measuring University Performance.

Among rankings of specific indicators, Harvard topped both the University Ranking by Academic Performance in 2019–20 and Mines ParisTech: Professional Ranking of World Universities in 2011, which measured universities' numbers of alumni holding CEO positions in Fortune Global 500 companies. According to annual polls done by The Princeton Review, Harvard is consistently among the top two most commonly named dream colleges in the United States for both students and their parents.

In 2019, Harvard's engineering school was ranked the third-best school in the world for engineering and technology by Times Higher Education.

In international relations, Foreign Policy magazine ranks Harvard best in the world at the undergraduate level and second in the world at the graduate level, behind the Walsh School of Foreign Service at Georgetown University.

Undergraduate demographics as of Fall 2023
Race and ethnicity	Total
White	33%
Asian	22%
International student	14%
Hispanic	12%
Black	9%
Two or more races	7%
Unknown	2%
Economic diversity
Low-income (Note: The percentage of students who received an income-based federal Pell grant intended for low-income students.)	17%
Affluent (Note: The percentage of students who are a part of the American middle class at the bare minimum.)	83%

== Student activities ==
=== Student government ===
The Undergraduate Council represented Harvard College undergraduate students until it was dissolved in 2022 and replaced by the Undergraduate Association. The Graduate Council represents students at all twelve graduate and professional schools, most of which also have their own student government.

=== Student media ===
The Harvard Crimson, founded in 1873 and run entirely by Harvard undergraduate students, is the university's primary student newspaper. Many notable alumni have worked at the Crimson, including two U.S. presidents, Franklin D. Roosevelt (AB, 1903) and John F. Kennedy (AB 1940).

== Athletics ==
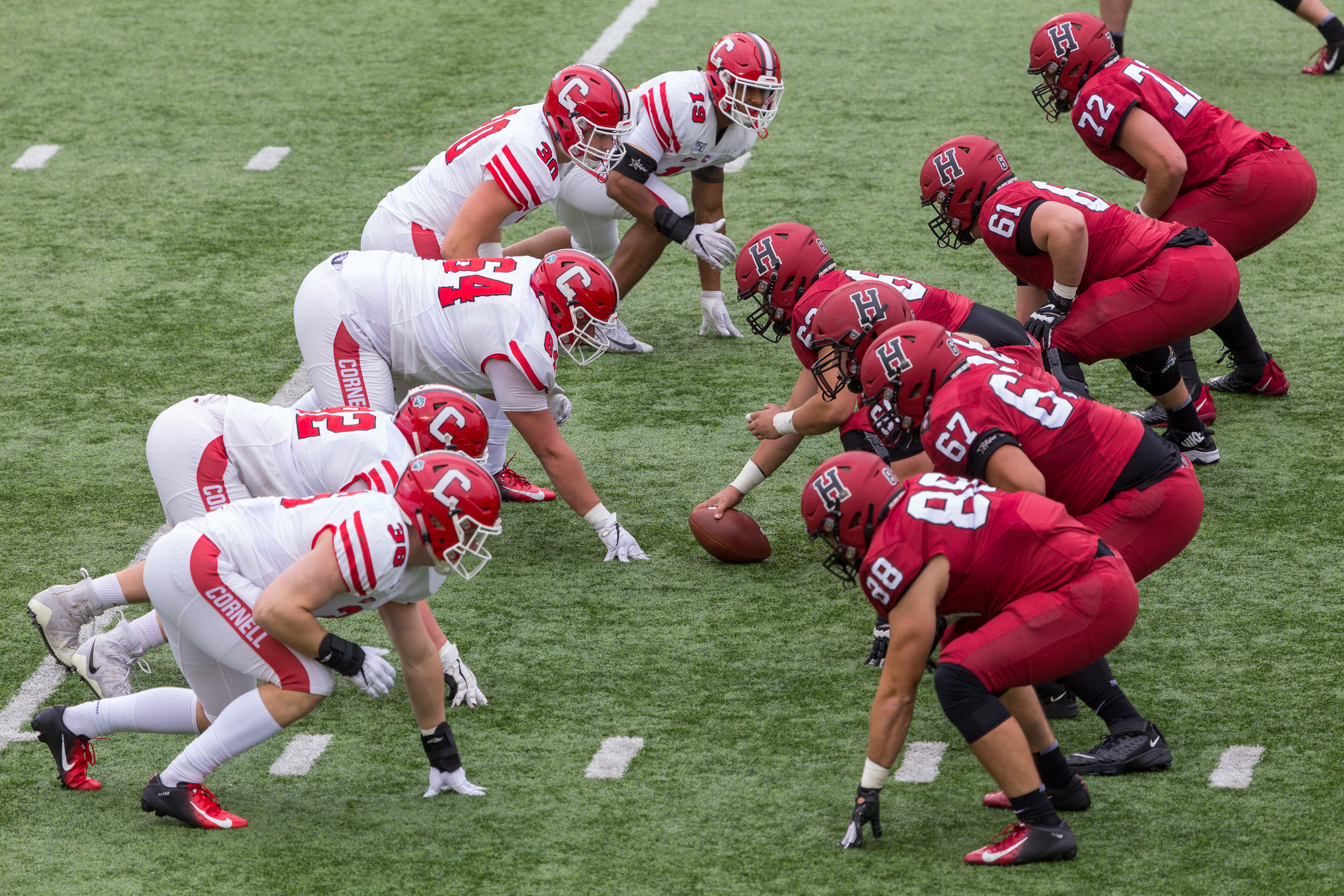
Harvard football (right) taking on Cornell (left) at Harvard Stadium in October 2019

Harvard College competes in the NCAA Division I Ivy League conference. The school fields 42 intercollegiate sports teams, more than any other college in the country.

Harvard and the other seven Ivy League universities are prohibited from offering athletic scholarships. The school color is crimson.

=== Fencing ===
The fencing team won the 2006 NCAA team championship in men's and women's combined fencing. Representing Harvard Crimson, Benjamin (Benji) Ungar won Gold in the 2006 Individual Men's Épée event at the NCAA Fencing Championship, and was named Harvard Athlete of The Year. In 2020, the fencing program received more attention following a student admission scandal which involved former fencing coach Peter Brand accepting bribes to admit at least two sons of Maryland businessman Jie "Jack" Zhao into Harvard as members of the fencing team.

=== Ice hockey ===
==== Men's ice hockey ====
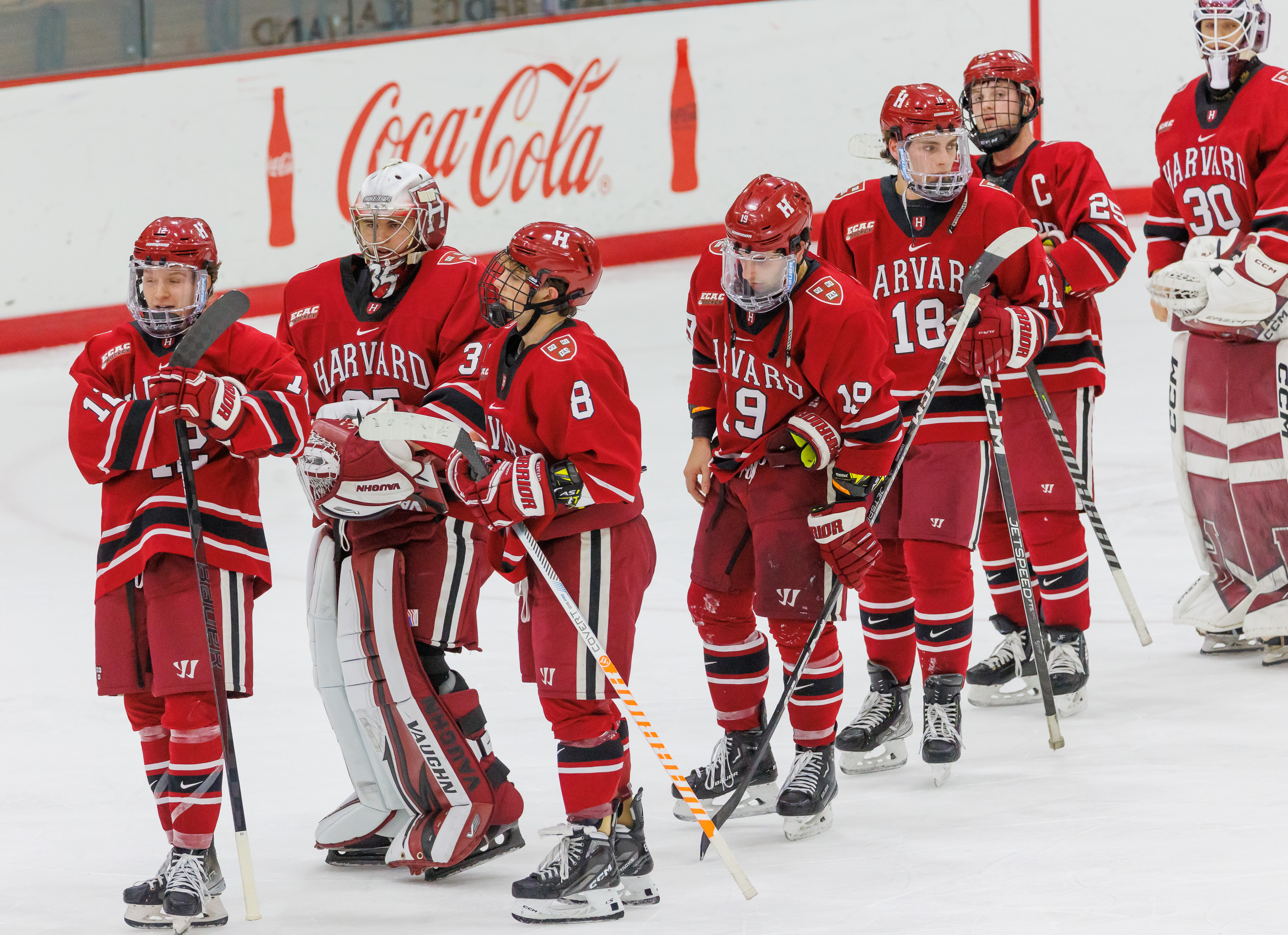
Harvard men's ice hockey team in 2023

The men's ice hockey team is one of the oldest intercollegiate ice hockey teams in the United States, having played their first game on January 19, 1898, in a 0–6 loss to Brown. Former head coach William H. Claflin and former captain George Owen are credited with the first use of line change in a game against Yale on March 3, 1923, when the Crimson substituted entire forward lines instead of individuals. The men's ice hockey team won the NCAA Division I Championship on April 1, 1989, defeating the Minnesota Golden Gophers 4–3 in overtime. The Cleary Cup, awarded to the ECAC regular-season champion, is named for former Harvard All-American hockey player, coach, and athletic director Bill Cleary, a member of the U.S. hockey team that won the 1960 Winter Olympics gold medal. The team competes in ECAC Hockey along with five other Ivy League schools and is coached by Harvard alumnus, Olympian, and former NHL forward, Ted Donato. Harvard competes in one of the most heated rivalries of college hockey at least twice each season against Harvard's archrival, the Cornell Big Red, in installments of the Cornell–Harvard hockey rivalry. Cornell and Harvard are the most storied programs currently in the ECAC.

=== National championships ===
In the NCAA Division I era, which began in 1973, Harvard Crimson teams have won five NCAA Division I championships as of 2024: men's ice hockey in 1989, women's lacrosse in 1990, women's rowing in 2003, and men's fencing in 2006 and 2024. Including the pre-NCAA era, Harvard has won 159 national championships across all sports. Its men's squash team holds the record for the most national collegiate championships in the sport. Harvard's first national championship came in 1880, when its track and field team won the national championship.

=== Rivalries ===
Harvard's athletic programs maintain a long-standing rivalry with Yale in all sports, especially in college football, where Harvard and Yale compete in an annual football rivalry, which has played 139 times as of 2024, dating back to its first meeting in 1875.

Every two years, Harvard and Yale track and field teams come together to compete against a combined Oxford and Cambridge team in the oldest continuous international amateur competition in the world.

In men's ice hockey, Harvard maintains a historic rivalry with Cornell, which dates back to their first meeting in 1910. The two teams play twice annually.

In men's rugby, Harvard maintains a rivalry with McGill, as demonstrated by the biennial Harvard-McGill rugby games, alternately played in Montreal and Cambridge.

== Notable people ==
=== Alumni ===
Since its founding nearly four centuries ago, Harvard alumni have distinguished themselves in academia, activism, arts, athletics, business, entrepreneurship, government, international affairs, journalism, media, music, non-profit organizations, politics, public policy, science, technology, writing, and other industries and fields. A 2024 study analyzed the educational backgrounds of the most successful and influential Americans—"30 different achievement groups totaling 26,198 people"—and found that Harvard alumni were unusually dominant. A 2025 study of 6,141 of the most influential people in the world discovered that Harvard alumni are massively overrepresented among the global elite, and that this finding remains true when all American elites are removed.

Among the world's universities and colleges, Harvard has the most U.S. presidents (eight), living billionaires (188), Nobel laureates (162), Pulitzer Prize winners (48), Fields Medal recipients (seven), Marshall scholars (252), and Rhodes Scholars (369) among its alumni. (Note: Universities adopt different metrics to claim Nobel or other academic award affiliates, some generous while others more stringent. "The official Harvard count, which is 49, only includes academicians affiliated at the time of winning the prize. Yet, the figure can be up to some 160 Nobel affiliates, the most worldwide, if visitors and professors of various ranks are all included (the most generous criterium), as what some other universities do". Archived from the original on March 22, 2023.: Rachel Sugar (May 29, 2015). "Where MacArthur 'Geniuses' Went to College". businessinsider.com. Archived from the original on November 12, 2020.; "Top Producers". us.fulbrightonline.org. Archived from the original on October 28, 2020.; "Statistics". www.marshallscholarship.org. Archived from the original on January 26, 2017.; "US Rhodes Scholars Over Time". www.rhodeshouse.ox.ac.uk. Archived from the original on November 25, 2020.; "Harvard, Stanford, Yale Graduate Most Members of Congress". Archived from the original on November 24, 2020.; "The complete list of Fields Medal winners". areppim AG. 2014. Archived from the original on January 24, 2016.) Harvard alumni also include nine Turing Award laureates, ten Academy Awards winners, and 110 Olympic medalists, including 46 gold medal winners.

Notable Harvard alumni include:

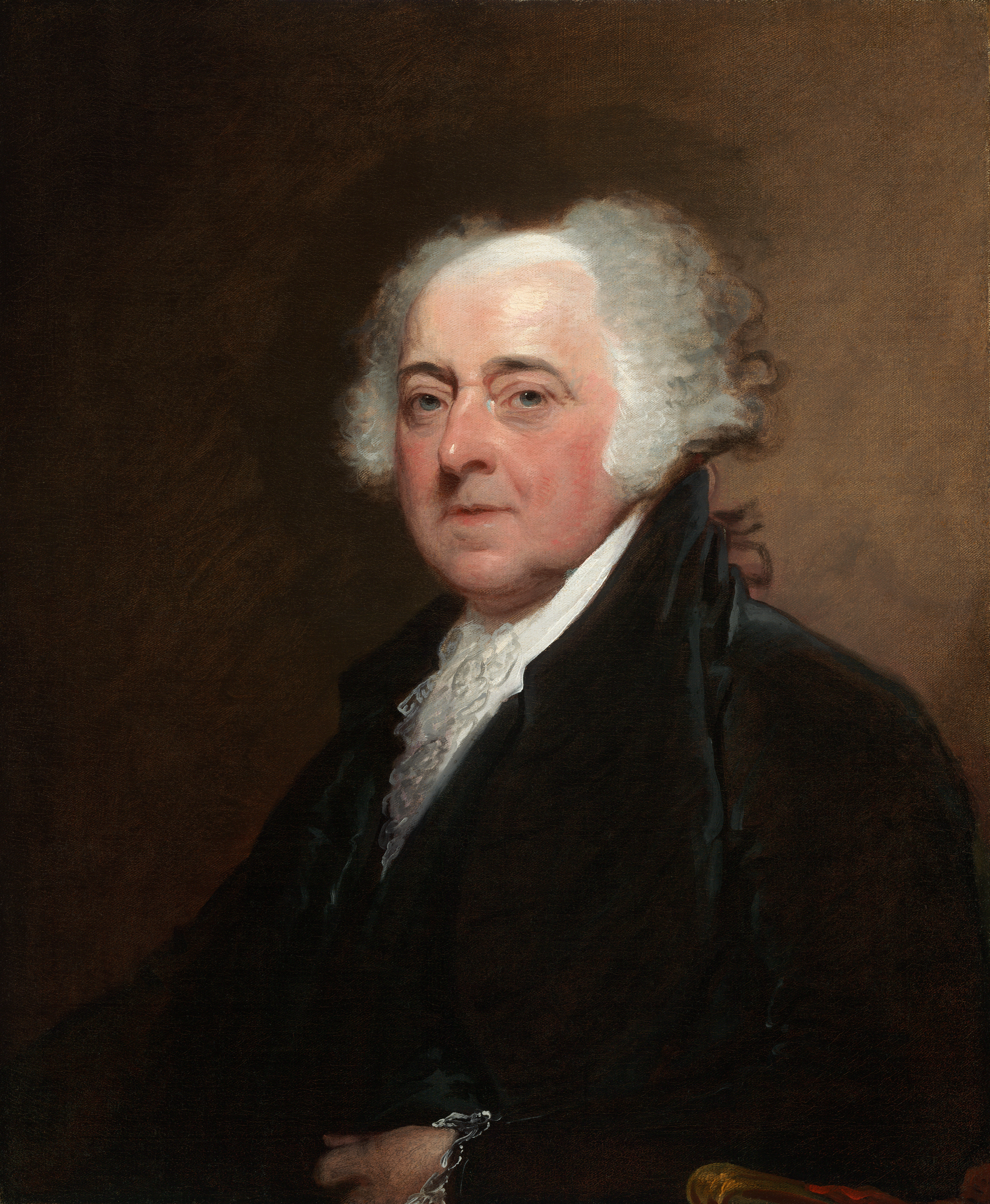
2nd president of the United States John Adams (AB, 1755; AM, 1758)

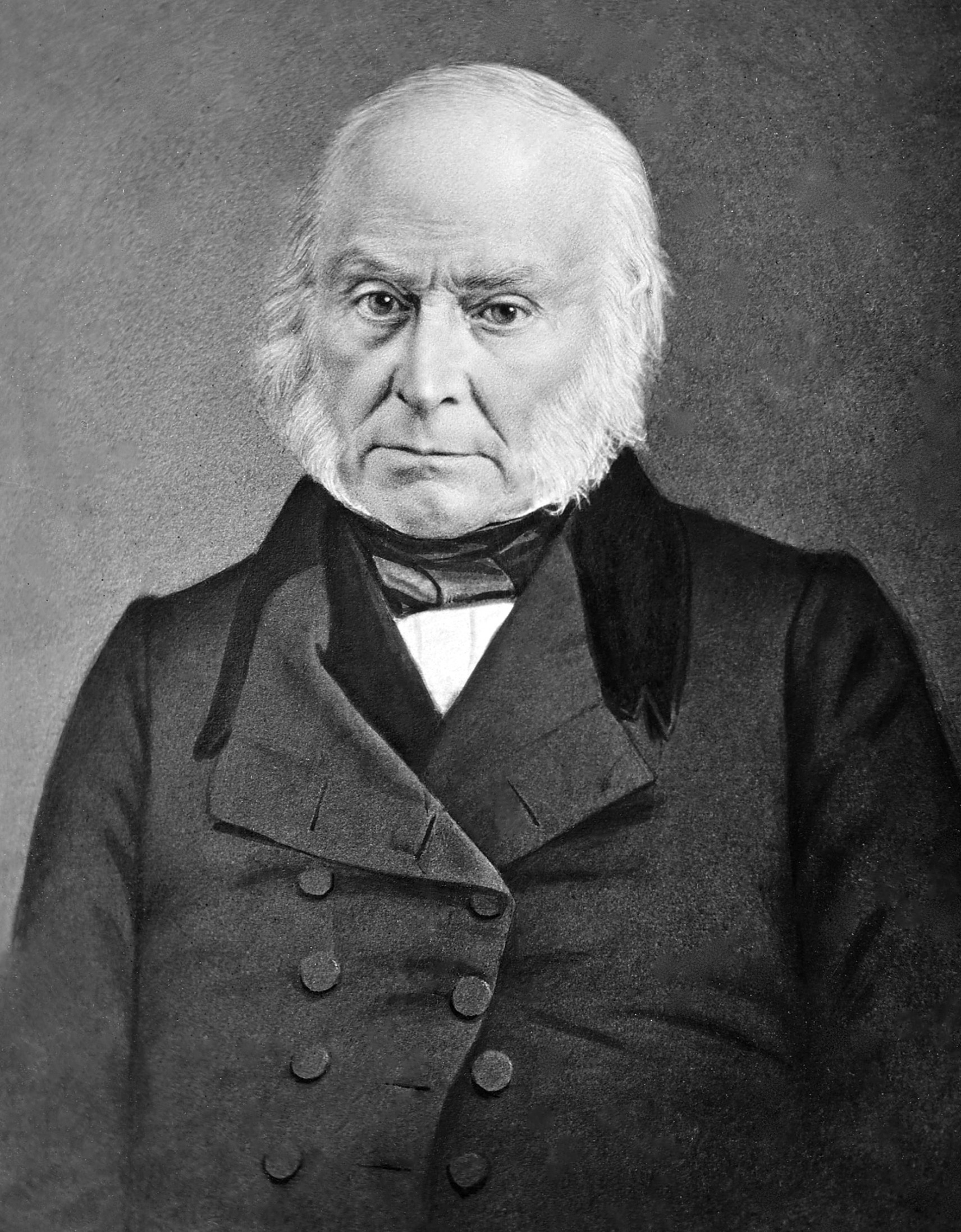
6th president of the United States John Quincy Adams (AB, 1787; AM, 1790)

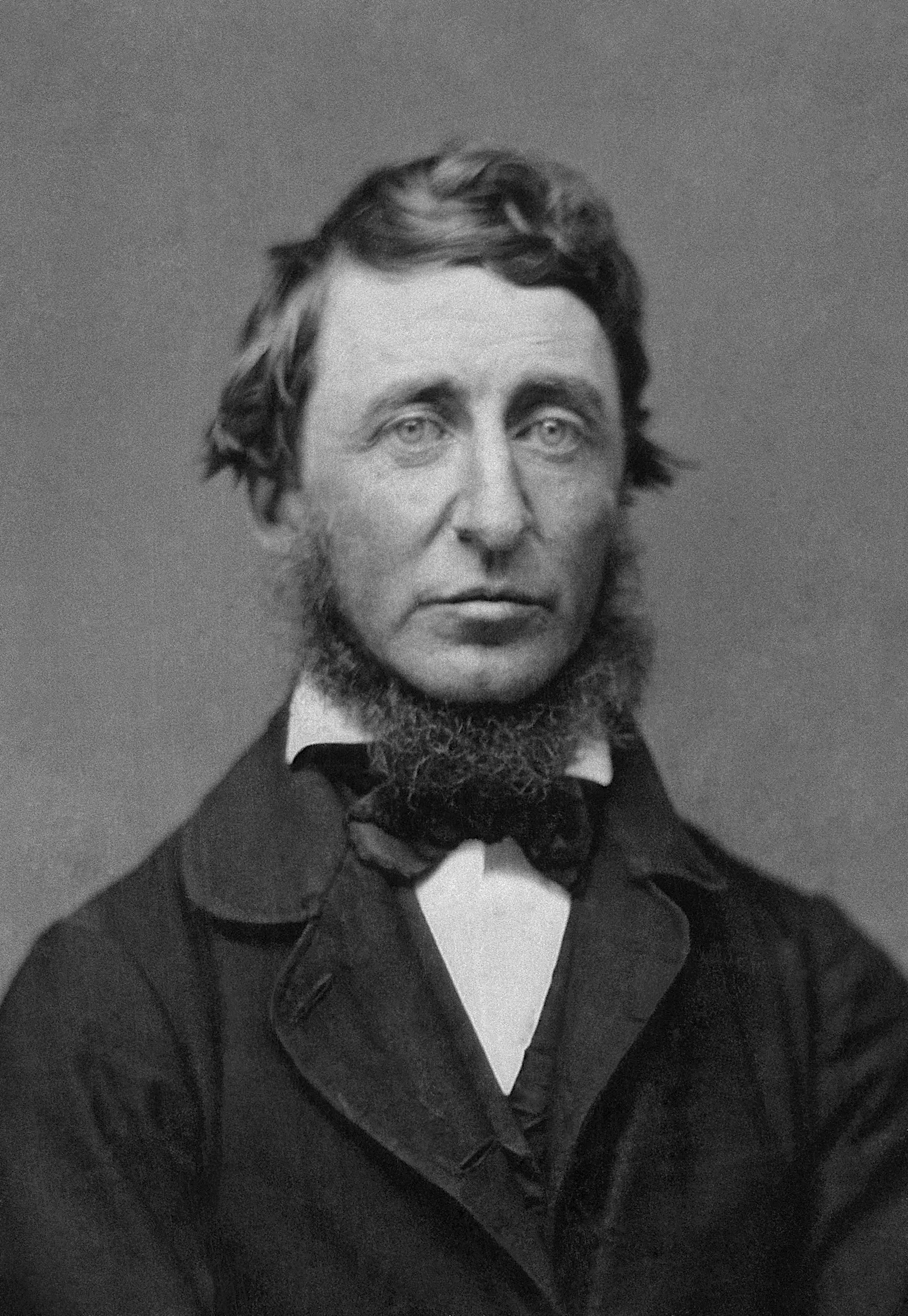
Author of Walden and philosopher Henry David Thoreau (AB, 1837)

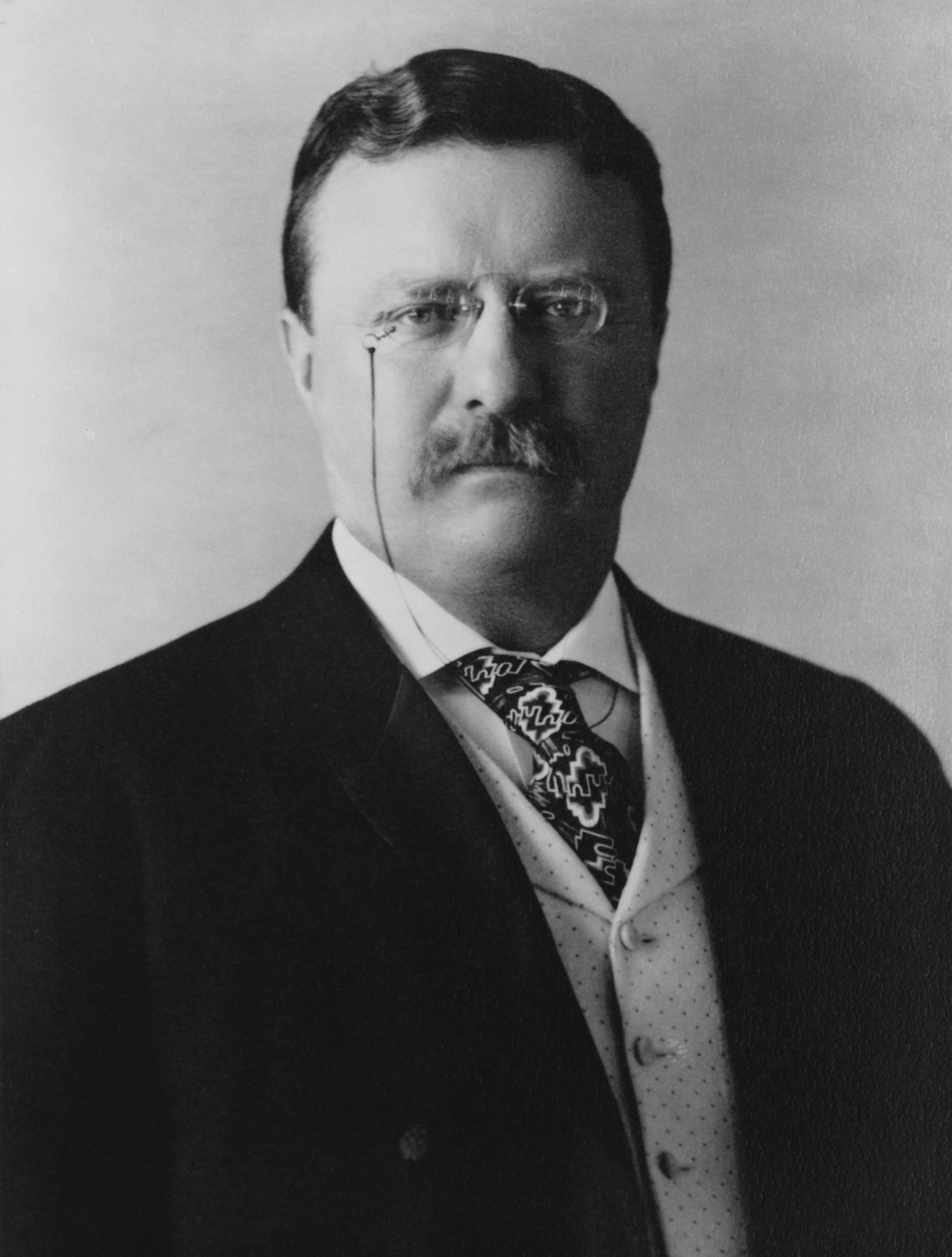
26th president of the United States and Nobel Peace Prize laureate Theodore Roosevelt (AB, 1880)

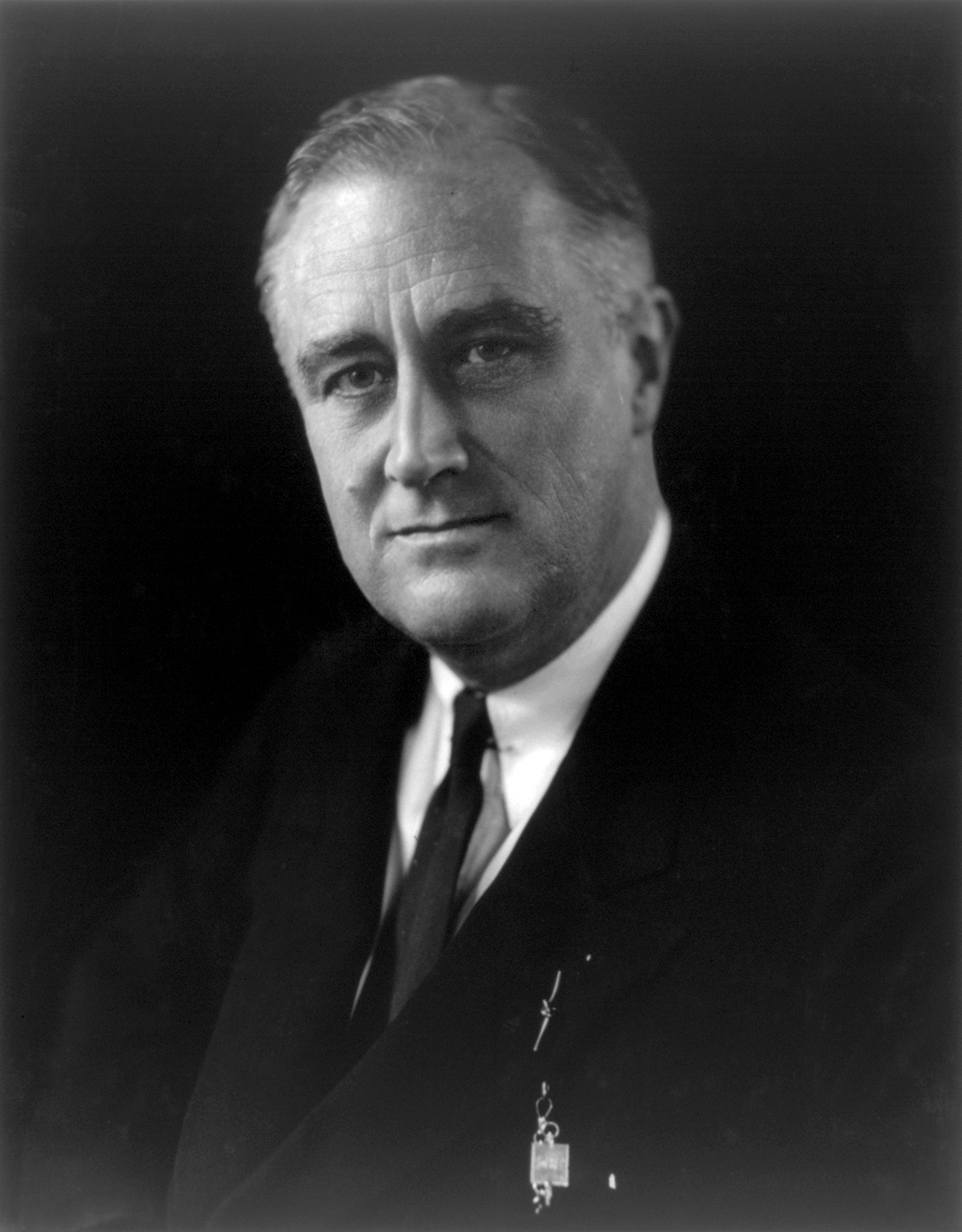
32nd president of the United States Franklin D. Roosevelt (AB, 1903)

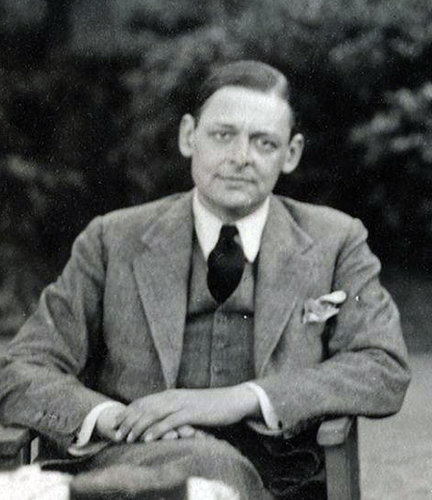
Poet and Nobel laureate in literature T. S. Eliot (AB, 1910; AM, 1911)

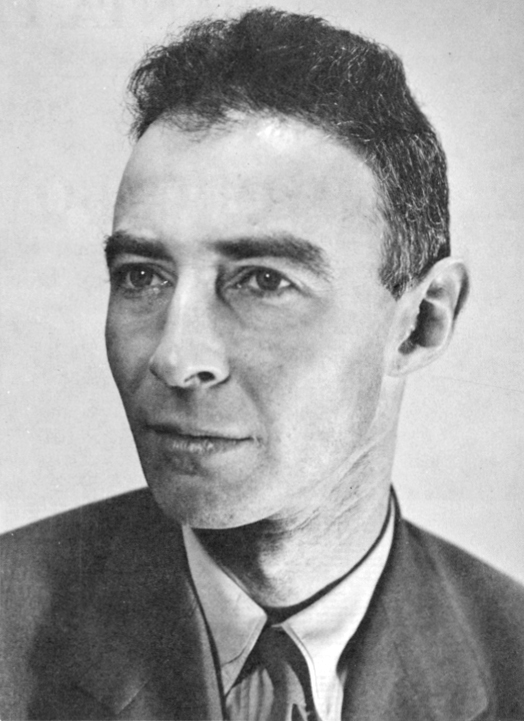
Physicist and leader of the Manhattan Project J. Robert Oppenheimer (AB, 1925)

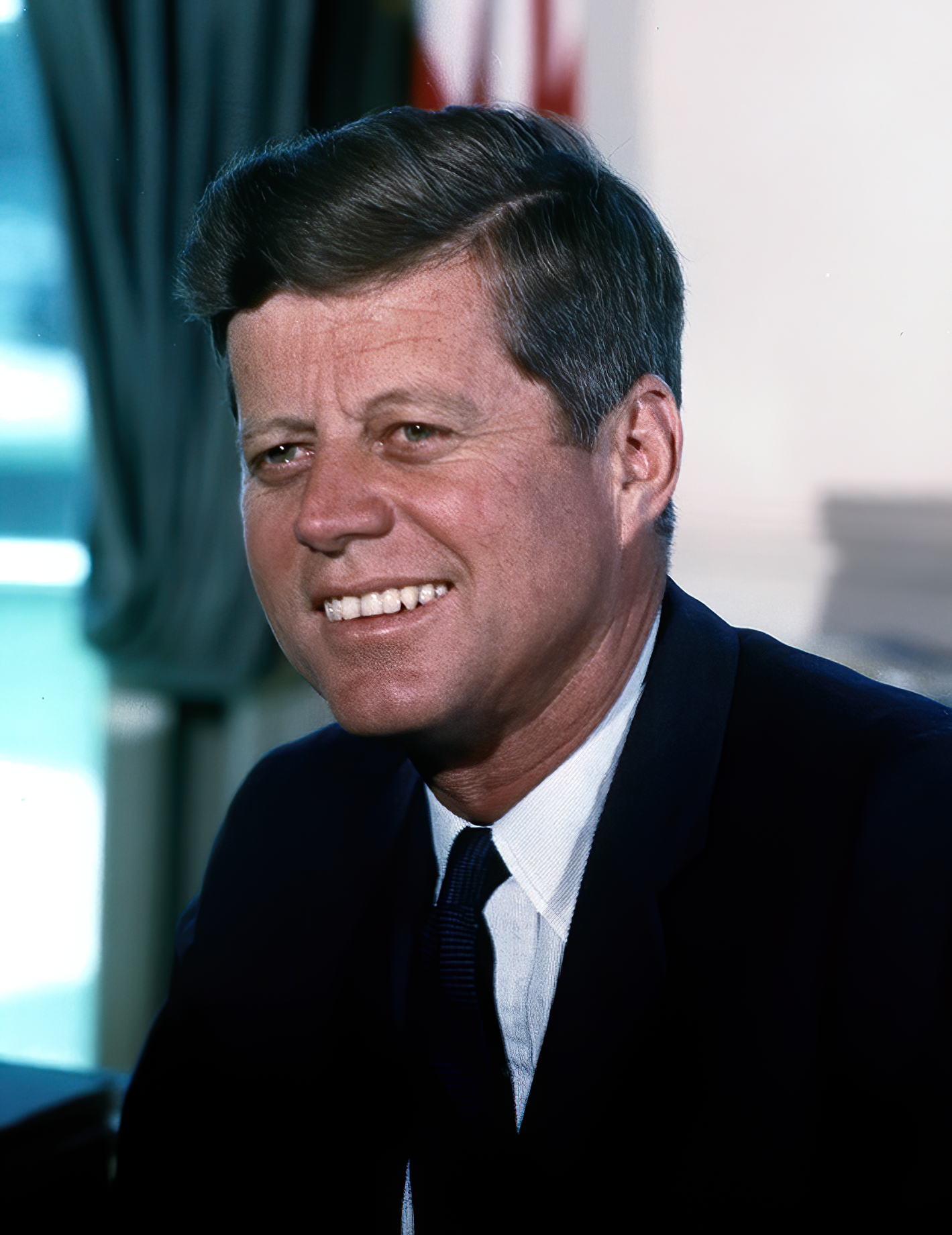
35th president of the United States John F. Kennedy (AB, 1940)

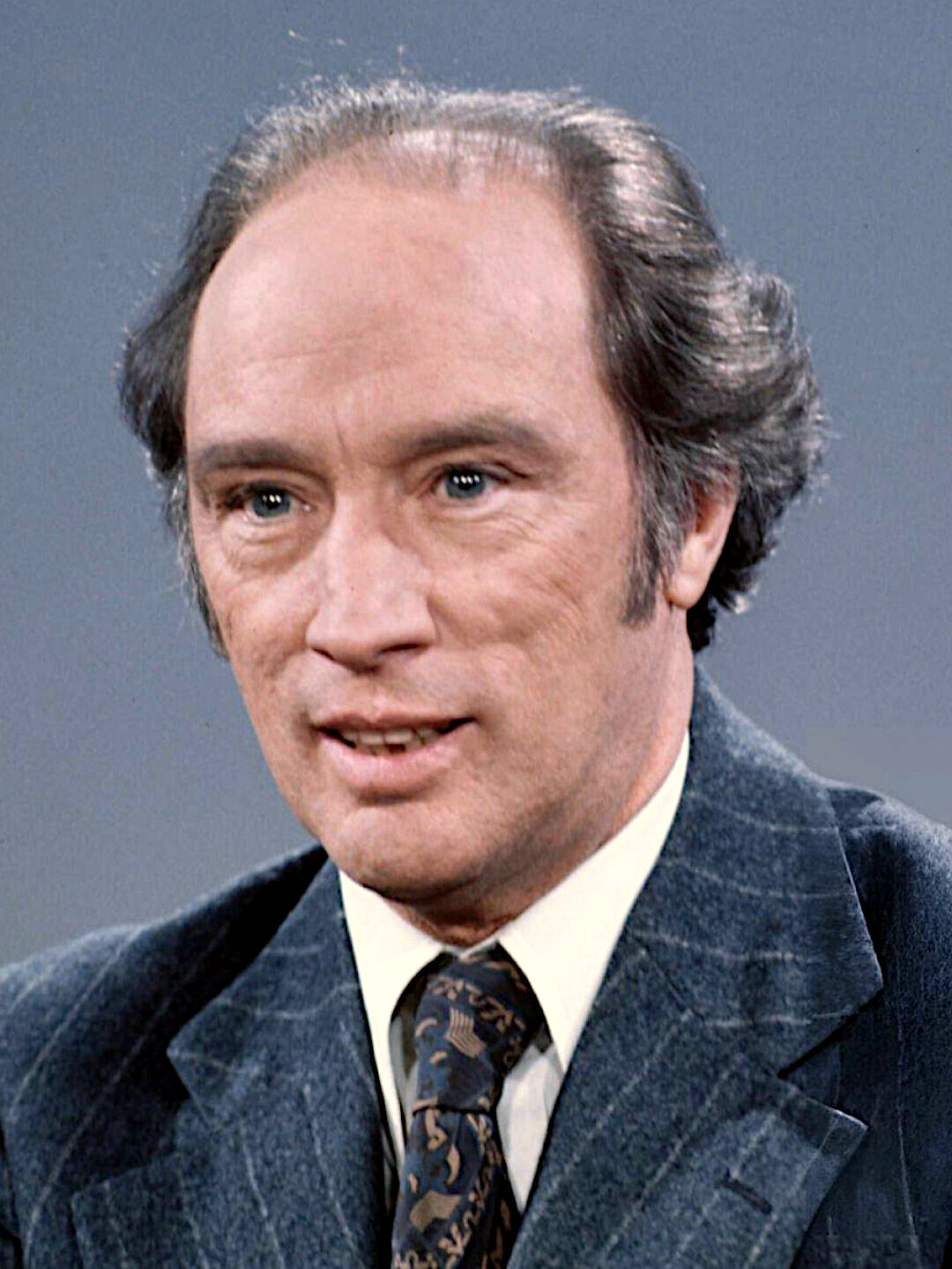
15th prime minister of Canada Pierre Trudeau (MA, 1947)

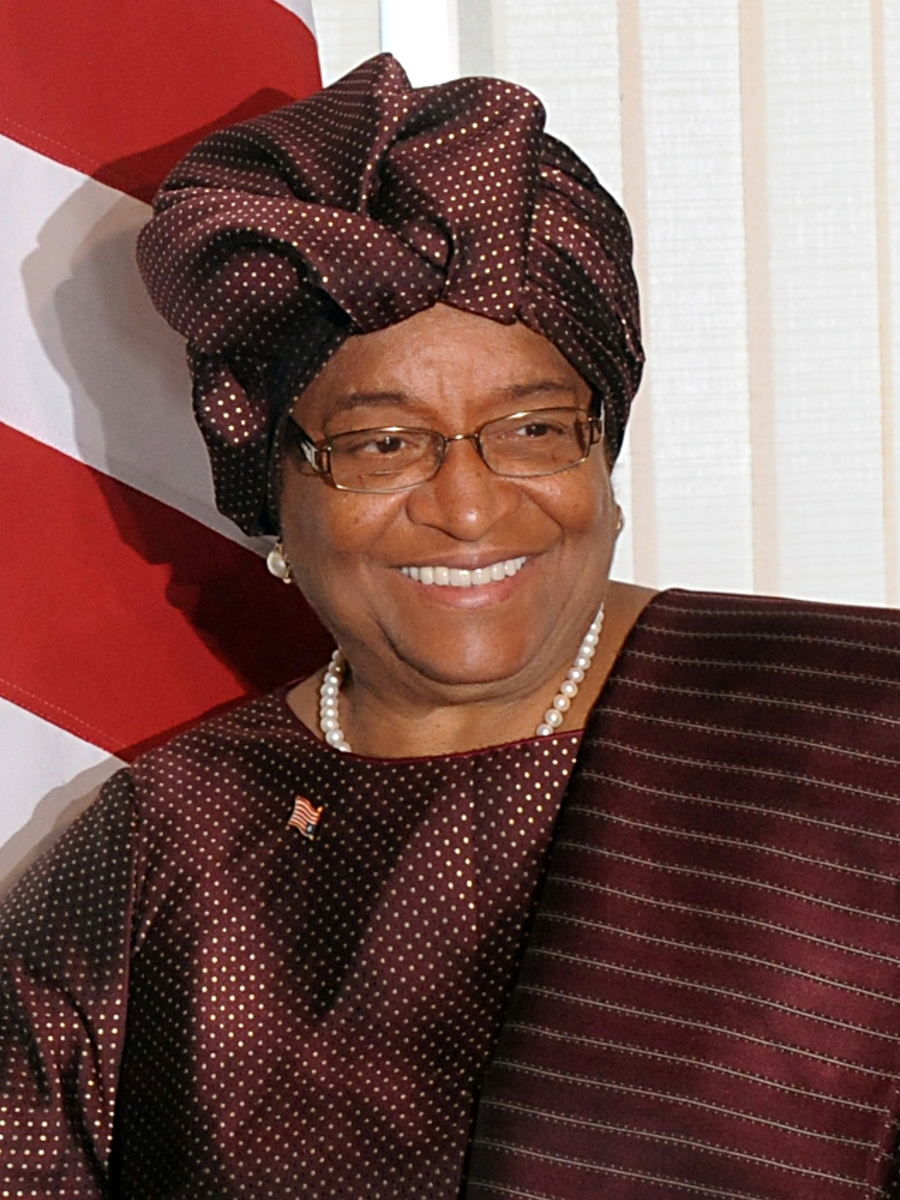
24th President of Liberia and Nobel Peace Prize laureate Ellen Johnson Sirleaf (MPA, 1971)

43rd president of the United States George W. Bush (MBA, 1975)

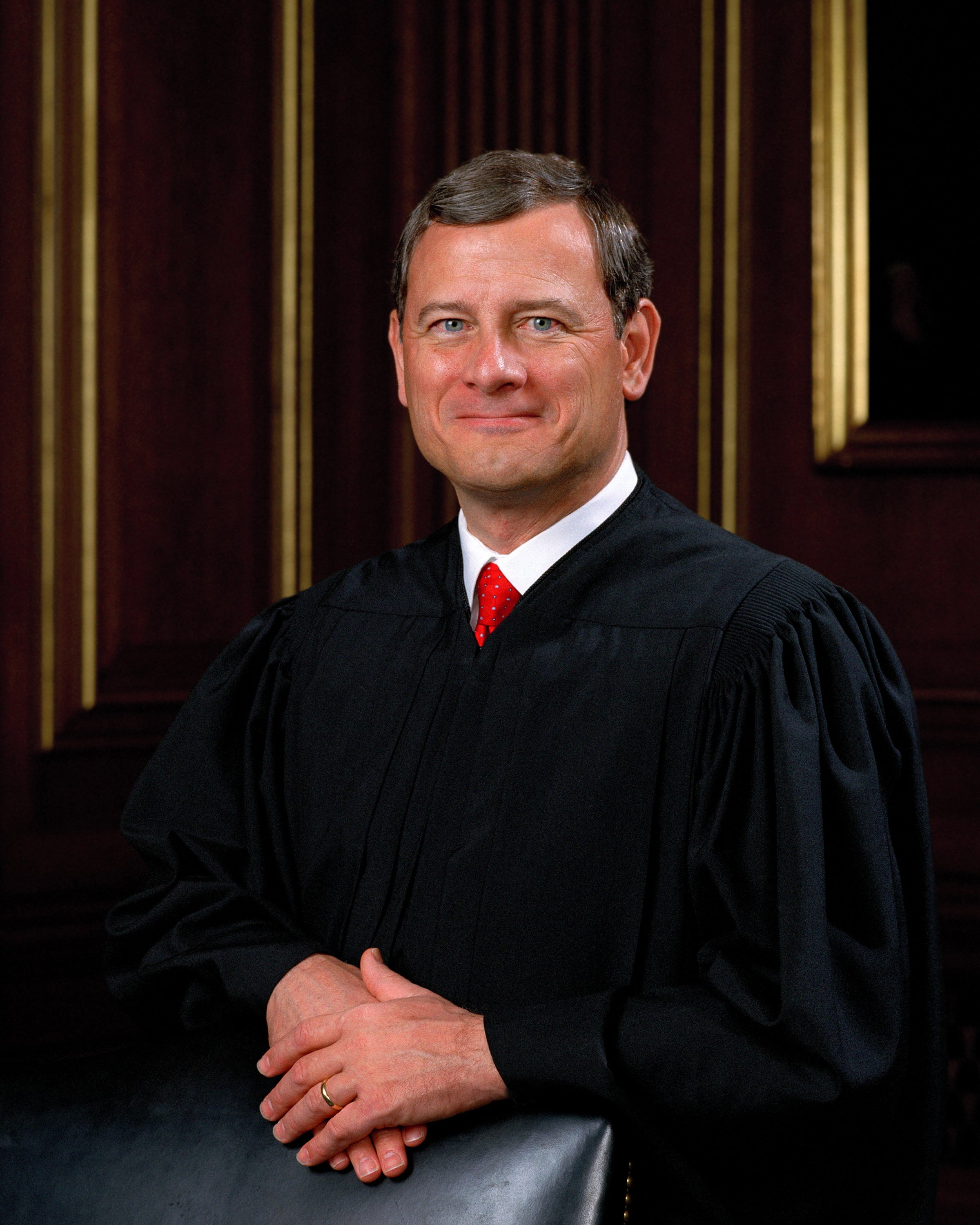
17th chief justice of the United States John Roberts (AB, 1976; JD, 1979)

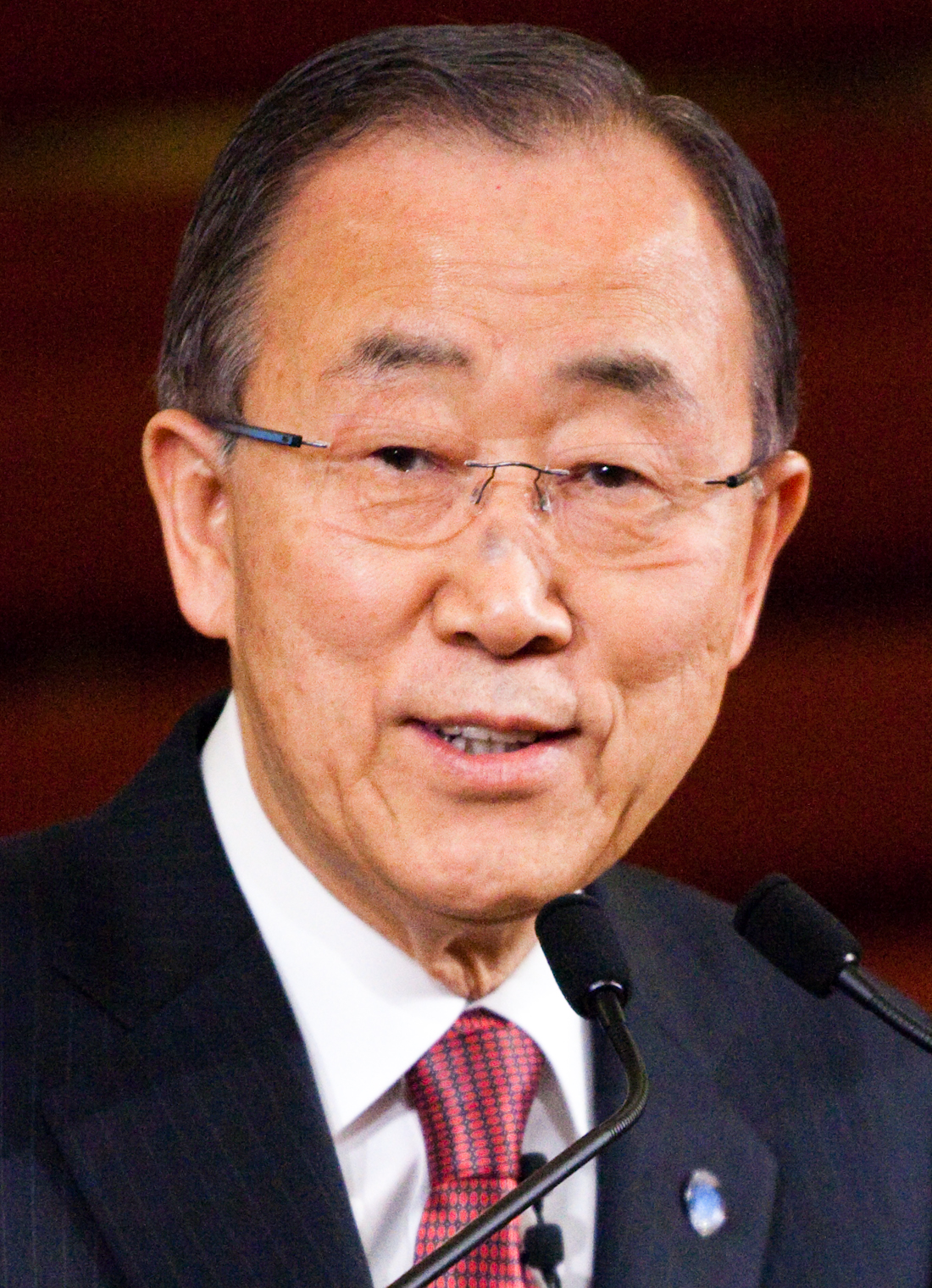
8th secretary-general of the United Nations Ban Ki-moon (MPA, 1984)

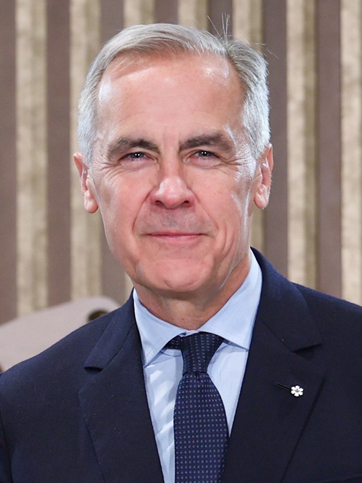
24th prime minister of Canada Mark Carney (AB, 1988)

44th president of the United States and Nobel Peace Prize laureate Barack Obama (JD, 1991)

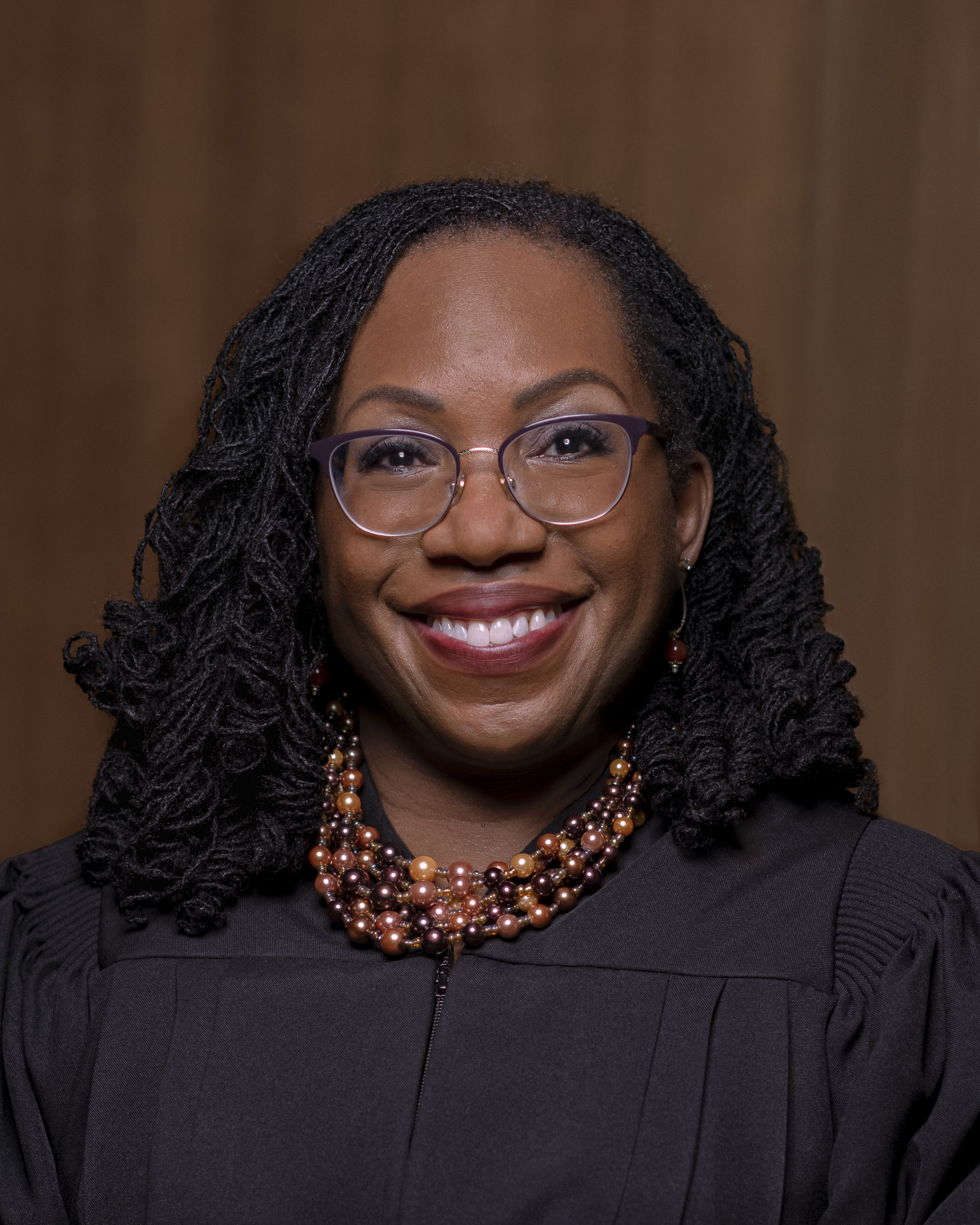
Associate Justice of the Supreme Court of the United States Ketanji Brown Jackson (AB,1992; JD, 1996)

=== Faculty ===
Notable past and present Harvard faculty include:

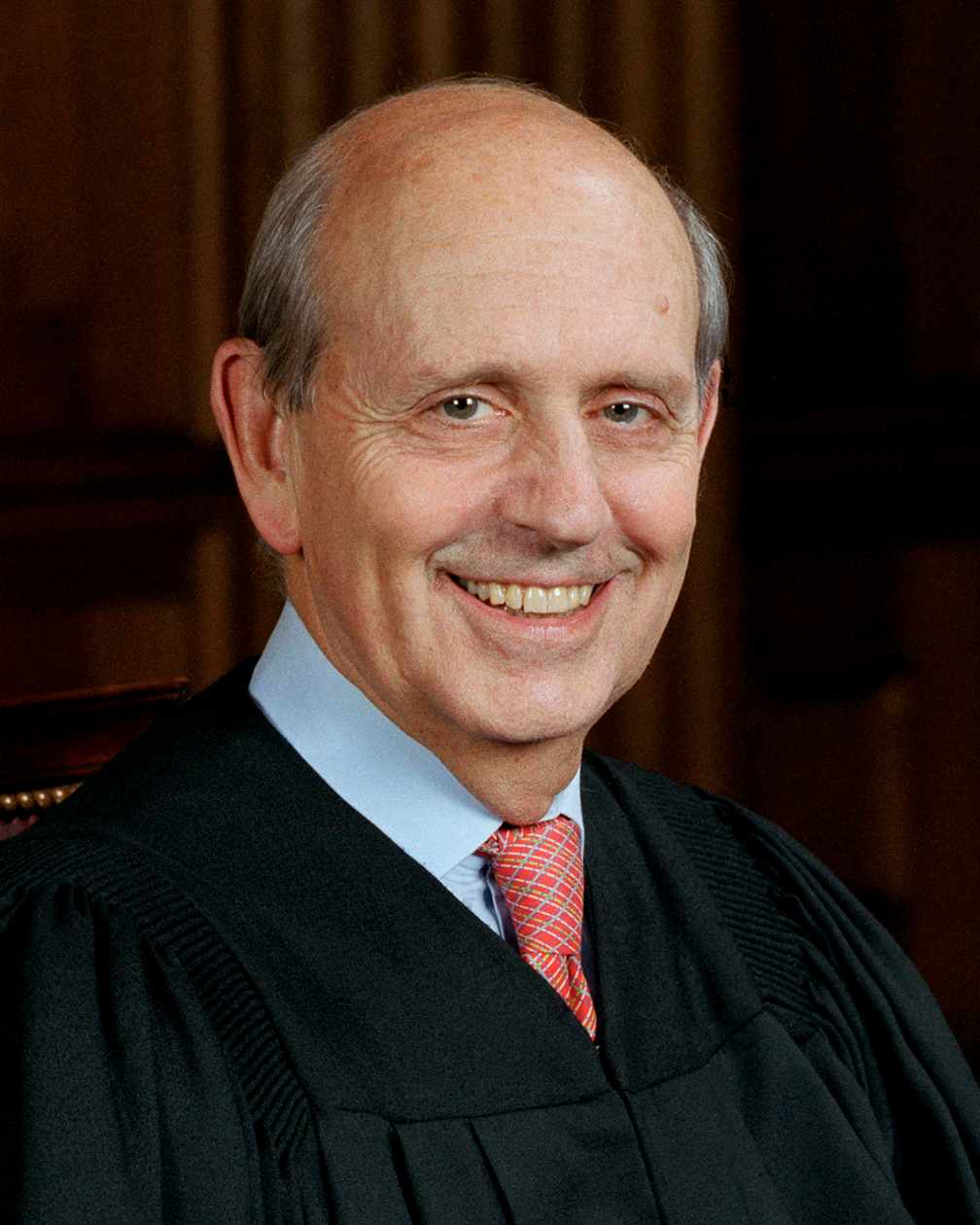
Stephen Breyer

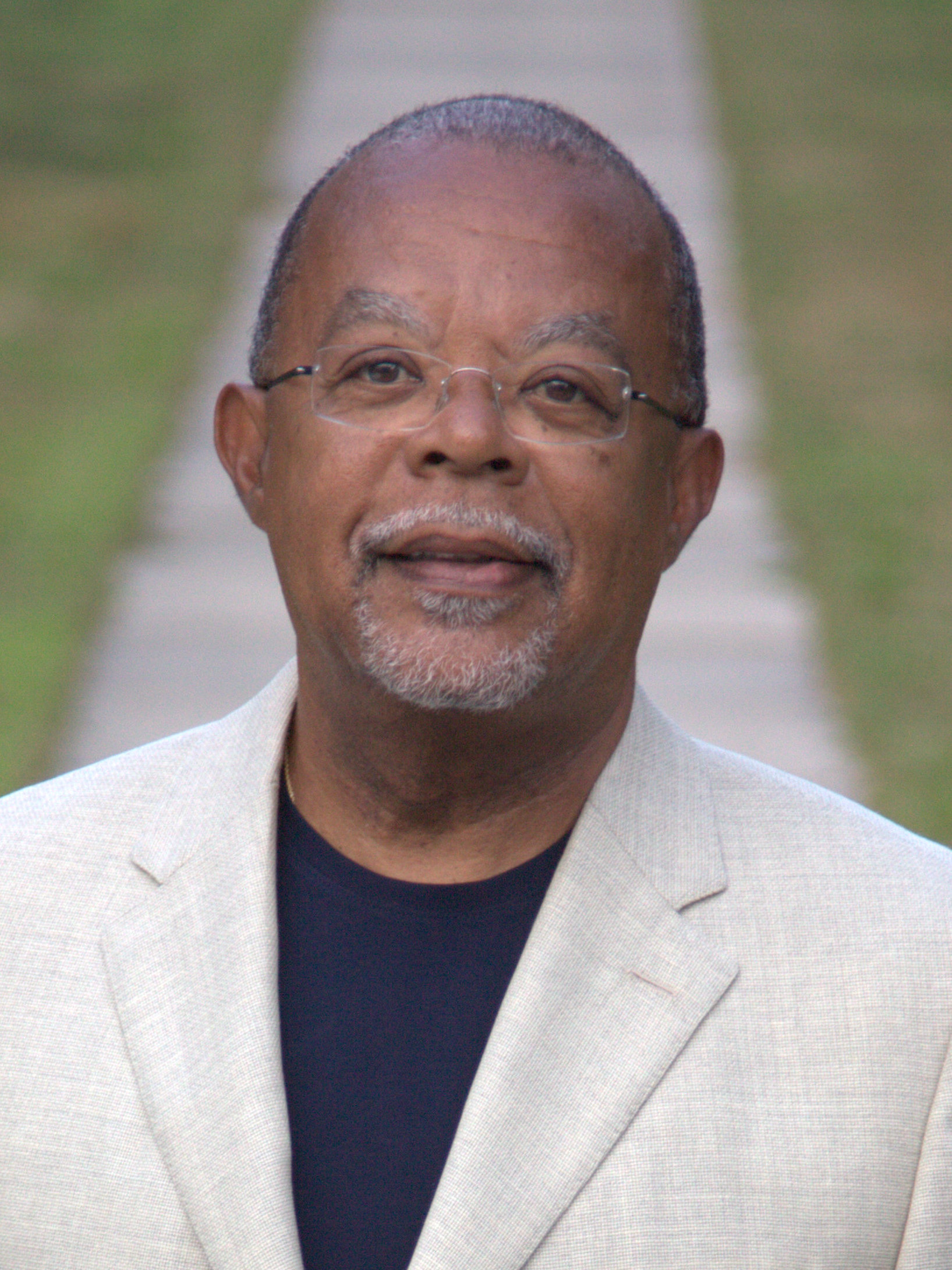
Henry Louis Gates Jr.

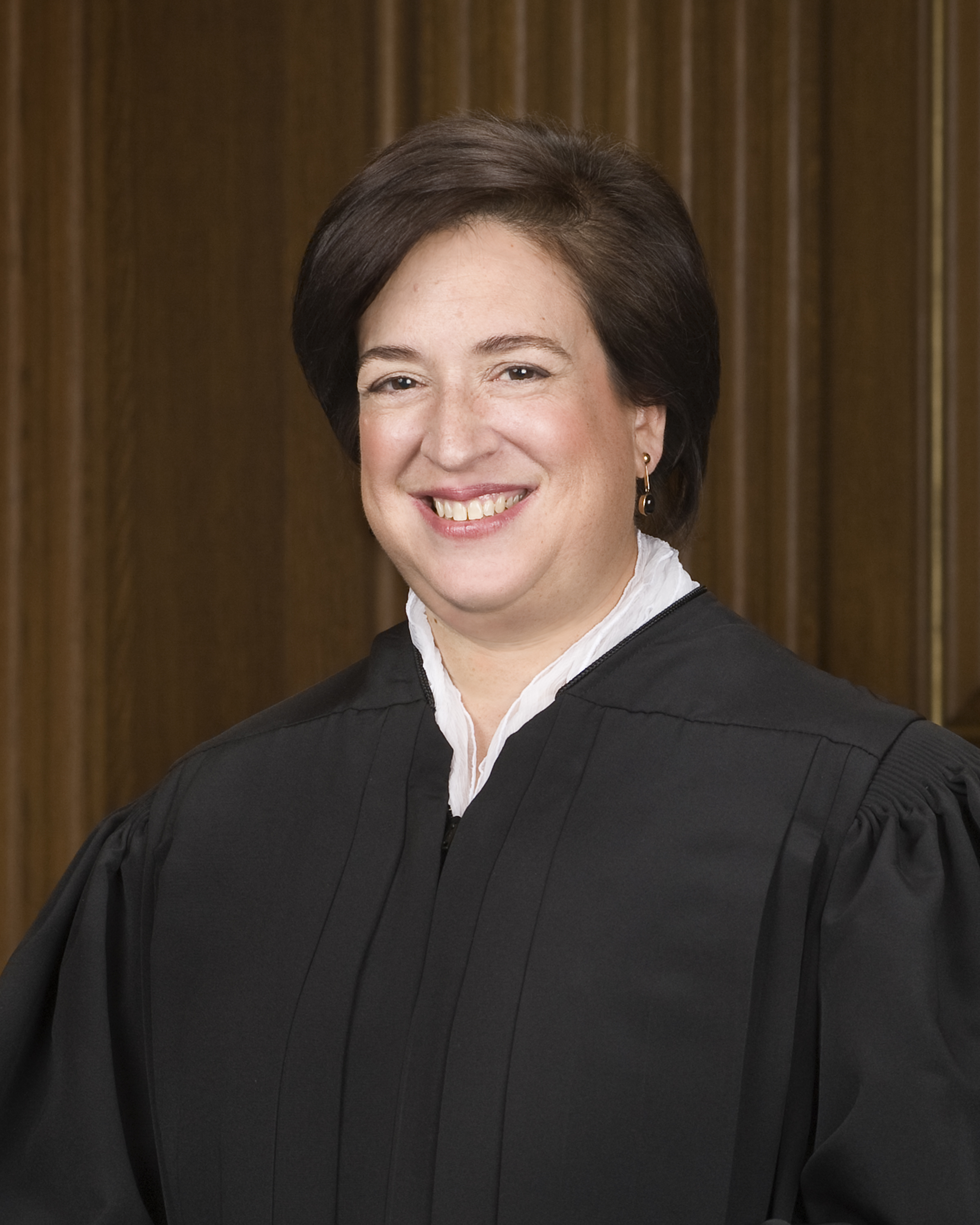
Elena Kagan

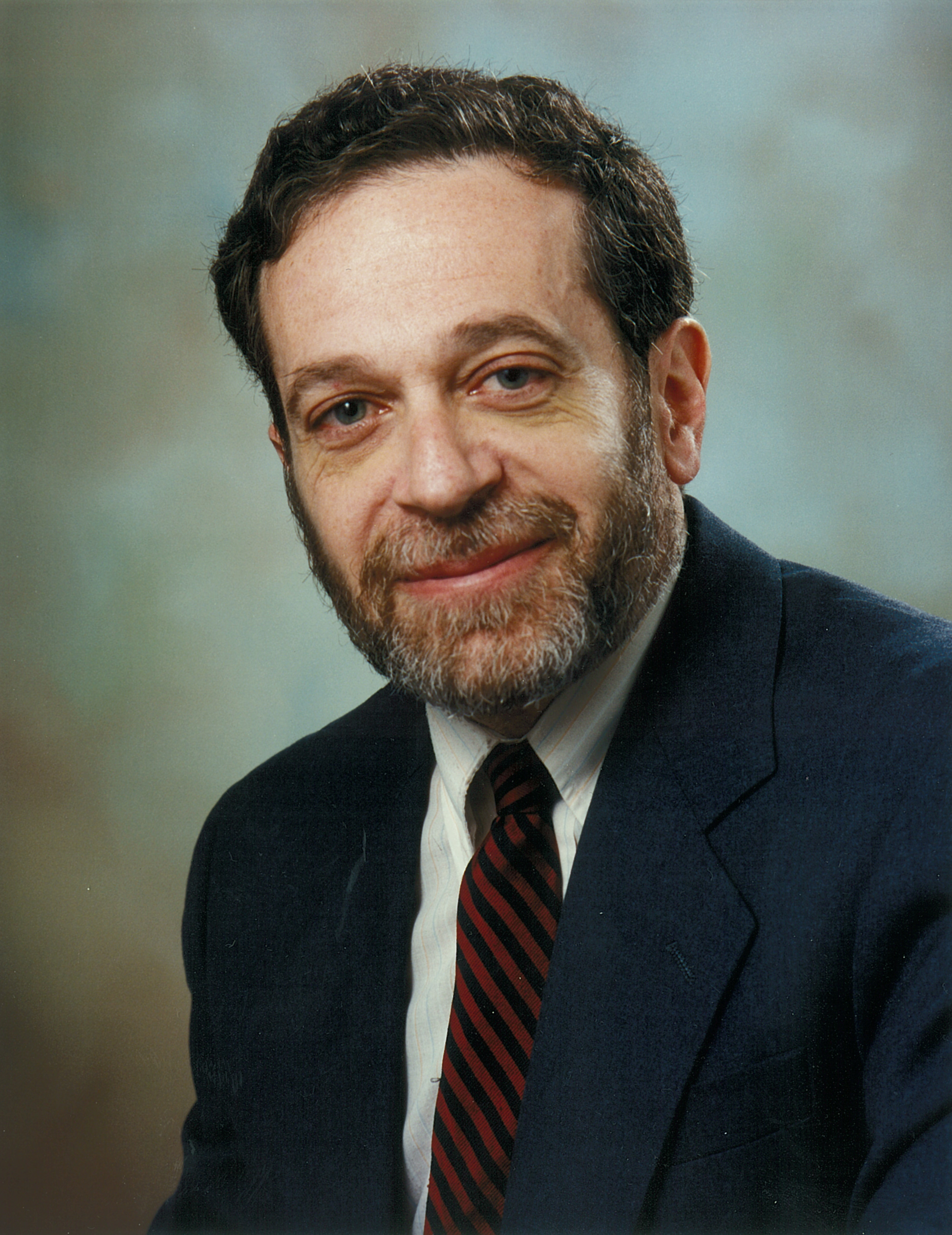
Robert Reich

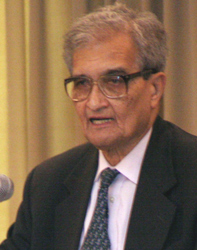
Amartya Sen

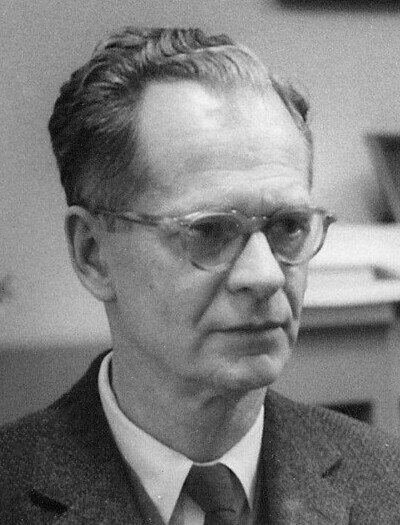
B. F. Skinner

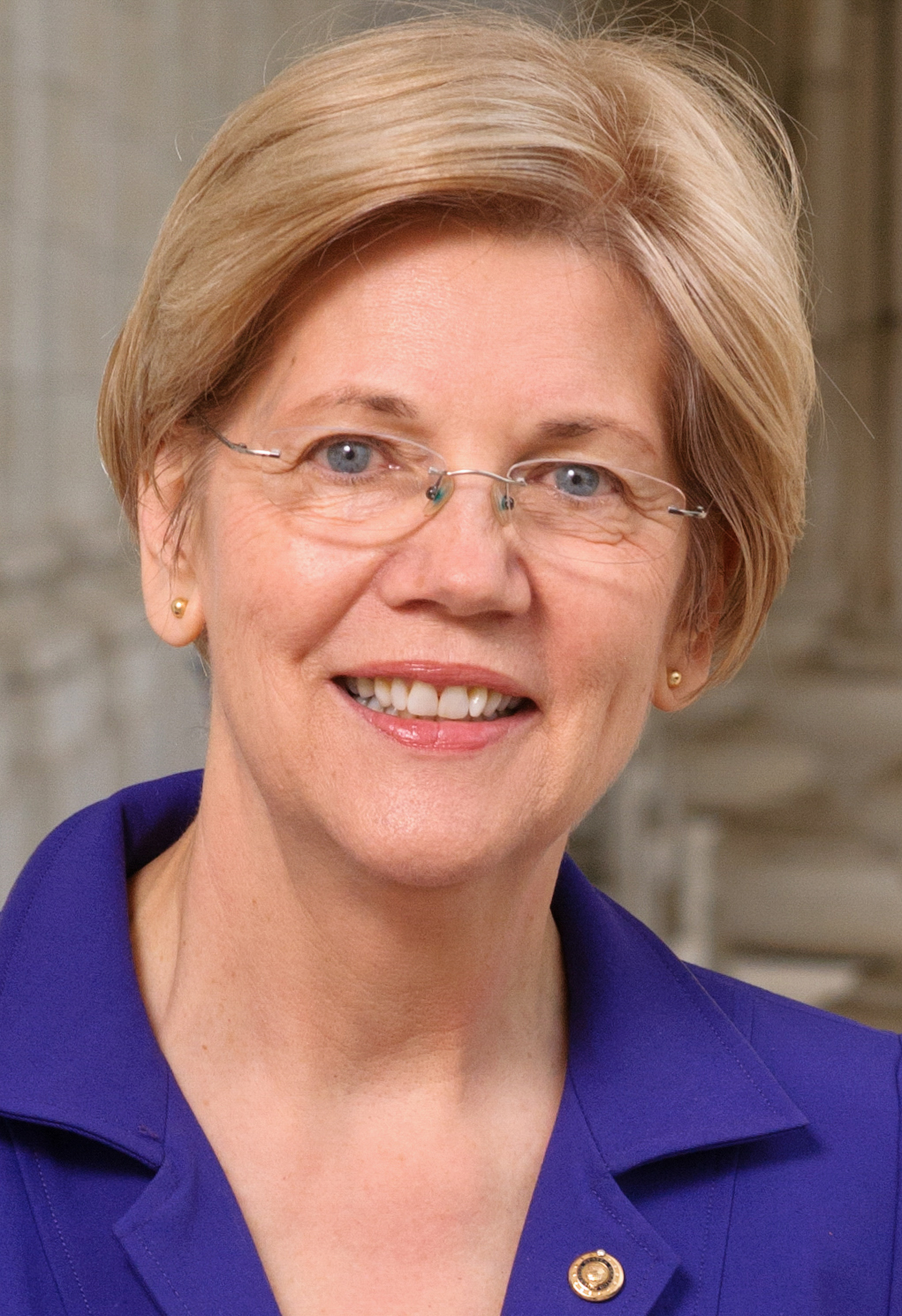
Elizabeth Warren

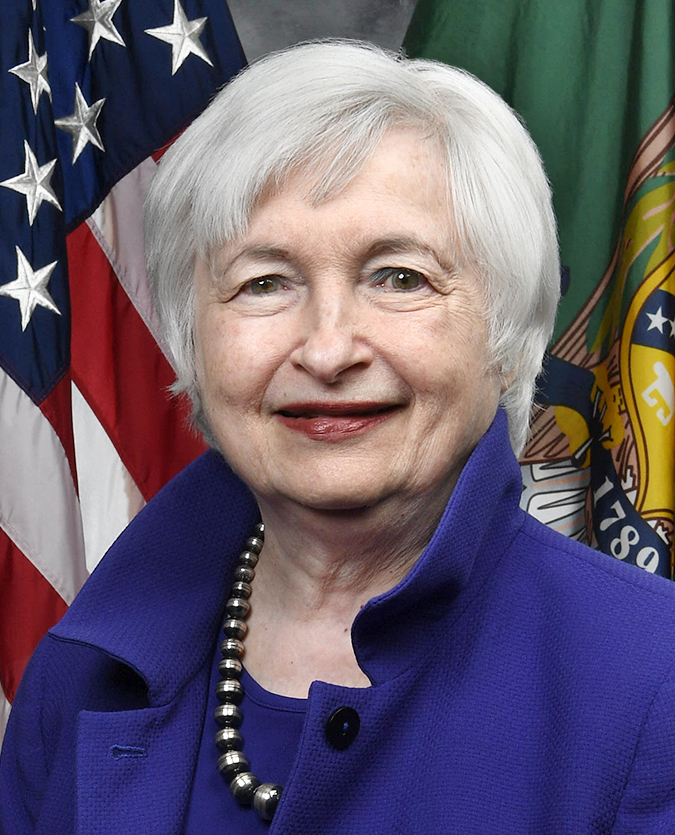
Janet Yellen

== In popular culture ==
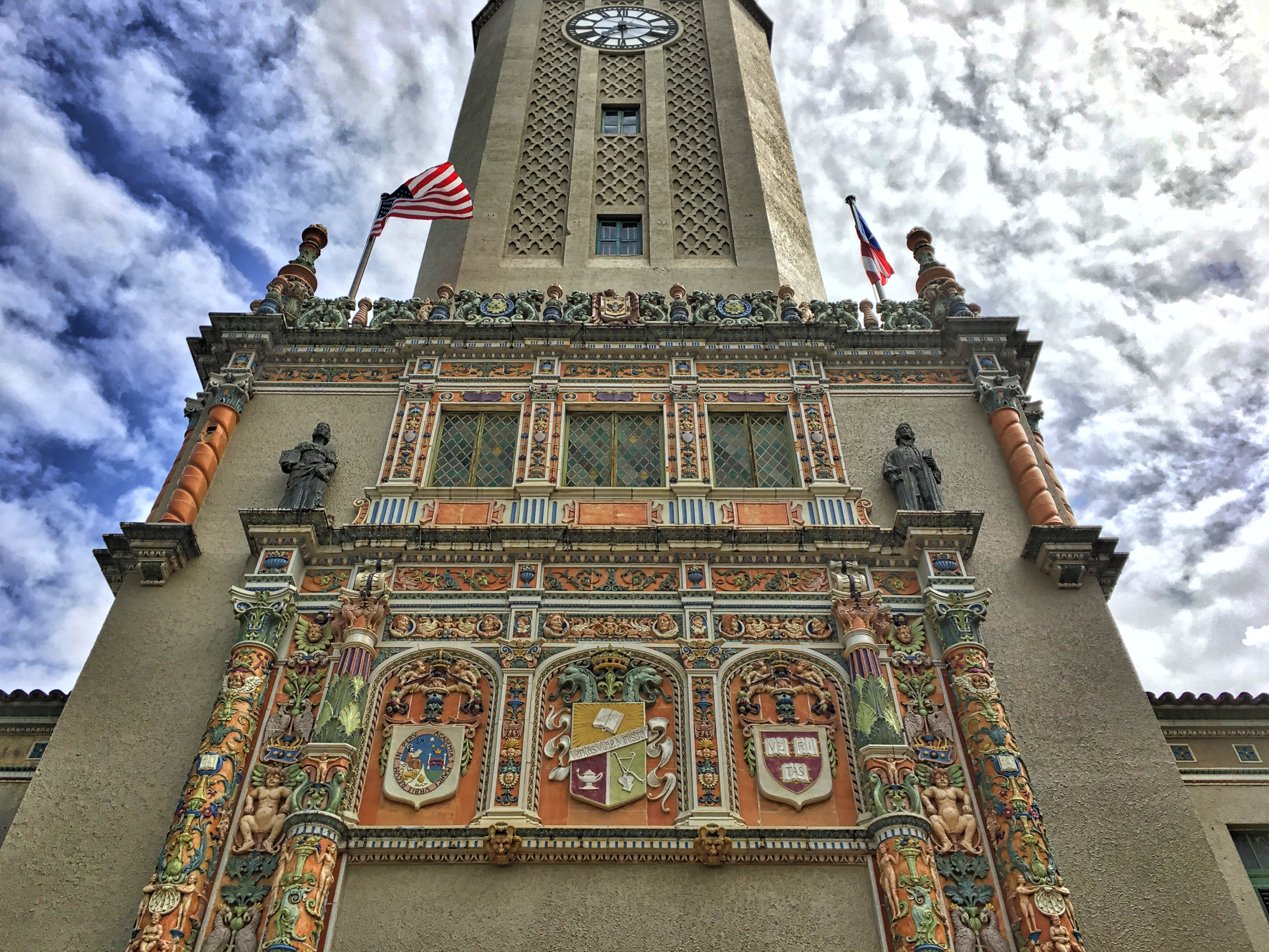
Tower at the University of Puerto Rico, showing the emblem of Harvard (on right), the oldest in the United States, and that of National University of San Marcos, Lima (left), the oldest in the Americas

Harvard's reputation as a center of elite achievement or elitist privilege has made it a frequent literary and cinematic backdrop. "In the grammar of film, Harvard has come to mean both tradition, and a certain amount of stuffiness," film critic Paul Sherman said in 2010.

=== Literature ===
In contemporary literature, Harvard University features prominently in multiple novels, including:

- The Sound and the Fury (1929) and Absalom, Absalom! (1936), two novels by William Faulkner, both of which depict Harvard student life.
- Of Time and the River (1935) by Thomas Wolfe, a fictionalized autobiography, depicting Wolfe's alter ego, Eugene Gant, a Harvard student.
- The Late George Apley (1937), by 1915 Harvard alumnus John P. Marquand, a novel presenting a satirical view of Harvard men in the early 20th century, which was awarded the Pulitzer Prize for Fiction.
- The Second Happiest Day (1953), by John P. Marquand, portrays Harvard during the World War II generation.

=== Films ===
Harvard University features prominently in the plots of multiple major films, including:

- Love Story (1970), a romance between a wealthy Harvard ice hockey player, played by Ryan O'Neal, and a brilliant Radcliffe student of modest means, played by Ali MacGraw.
- The Paper Chase (1973), a drama based on the 1971 novel of the same name by Harvard alumnus John Jay Osborn Jr., about a first year Harvard Law School student facing a demanding contract law course and professor.
- A Small Circle of Friends (1980), a drama about three Harvard University students in the 1960s
- Prozac Nation (1994), a psychological drama starring Christina Ricci based on the novel of the same name by Elizabeth Wurtzel, which documents her real life story as a 19-year-old Harvard freshman struggling with substance abuse and clinical depression.
- Legally Blonde (2001), a comedy film starring Reese Witherspoon a blonde sorority girl who enrolls in Harvard Law School to get her ex-boyfriend back.
- Homeless to Harvard: The Liz Murray Story (2003), a Lifetime biographical television film, which chronicles the real life story of Liz Murray (played by Thora Birch), who overcomes homelessness and a dysfunctional family to gain entry and a scholarship to Harvard after winning a New York Times-sponsored essay competition.
- The Social Network (2010), a biographical drama film which portrays the founding of social networking website Facebook.

== See also ==
- Big Three (colleges)
- Academic regalia of Harvard University
- Gore Hall
- Harvard College social clubs
- Harvard University Police Department
- Harvard University Press
- Harvard/MIT Cooperative Society
- I, Too, Am Harvard
- List of Harvard University named chairs
- List of universities by number of billionaire alumni
- List of Nobel laureates affiliated with Harvard University
- List of oldest universities in continuous operation
- Outline of Harvard University
- Secret Court of 1920

== Bibliography ==
- Abelmann, Walter H., ed. The Harvard-MIT Division of Health Sciences and Technology: The First 25 Years, 1970–1995 (2004). 346 pp.
- Beecher, Henry K. and Altschule, Mark D. Medicine at Harvard: The First 300 Years (1977). 569 pp.
- Bentinck-Smith, William, ed. The Harvard Book: Selections from Three Centuries (2d ed.1982). 499 pp.
- Bethell, John T.; Hunt, Richard M.; and Shenton, Robert. Harvard A to Z (2004). 396 pp. excerpt and text search
- Bethell, John T. Harvard Observed: An Illustrated History of the University in the Twentieth Century, Harvard University Press, 1998, ISBN 0-674-37733-8
- Bunting, Bainbridge. Harvard: An Architectural History (1985). 350 pp.
- Carpenter, Kenneth E. The First 350 Years of the Harvard University Library: Description of an Exhibition (1986). 216 pp.
- Cuno, James et al. Harvard's Art Museums: 100 Years of Collecting (1996). 364 pp.
- Elliott, Clark A. and Rossiter, Margaret W., eds. Science at Harvard University: Historical Perspectives (1992). 380 pp.
- Hall, Max. Harvard University Press: A History (1986). 257 pp.
- Hay, Ida. Science in the Pleasure Ground: A History of the Arnold Arboretum (1995). 349 pp.
- Hoerr, John, We Can't Eat Prestige: The Women Who Organized Harvard; Temple University Press, 1997, ISBN 1-56639-535-6
- Howells, Dorothy Elia. A Century to Celebrate: Radcliffe College, 1879–1979 (1978). 152 pp.
- Keller, Morton, and Phyllis Keller. Making Harvard Modern: The Rise of America's University (2001), major history covers 1933 to 2002 "online edition". Archived from the original on July 2, 2012 – via Questia.
- Lewis, Harry R. Excellence Without a Soul: How a Great University Forgot Education (2006) ISBN 1-58648-393-5
- Morison, Samuel Eliot. Three Centuries of Harvard, 1636–1936 (1986) 512pp; excerpt and text search
- Powell, Arthur G. The Uncertain Profession: Harvard and the Search for Educational Authority (1980). 341 pp.
- Reid, Robert. Year One: An Intimate Look inside Harvard Business School (1994). 331 pp.
- Rosovsky, Henry. The University: An Owner's Manual (1991). 312 pp.
- Rosovsky, Nitza. The Jewish Experience at Harvard and Radcliffe (1986). 108 pp.
- Seligman, Joel. The High Citadel: The Influence of Harvard Law School (1978). 262 pp.
- Sollors, Werner; Titcomb, Caldwell; and Underwood, Thomas A., eds. Blacks at Harvard: A Documentary History of African-American Experience at Harvard and Radcliffe (1993). 548 pp.
- Trumpbour, John, ed., How Harvard Rules. Reason in the Service of Empire, Boston: South End Press, 1989, ISBN 0-89608-283-0
- Ulrich, Laurel Thatcher, ed., Yards and Gates: Gender in Harvard and Radcliffe History, New York: Palgrave Macmillan, 2004. 337 pp.
- Winsor, Mary P. Reading the Shape of Nature: Comparative Zoology at the Agassiz Museum (1991). 324 pp.
- Wright, Conrad Edick. Revolutionary Generation: Harvard Men and the Consequences of Independence (2005). 298 pp.
