= Parker, Thomas & Rice =

Architectural firm

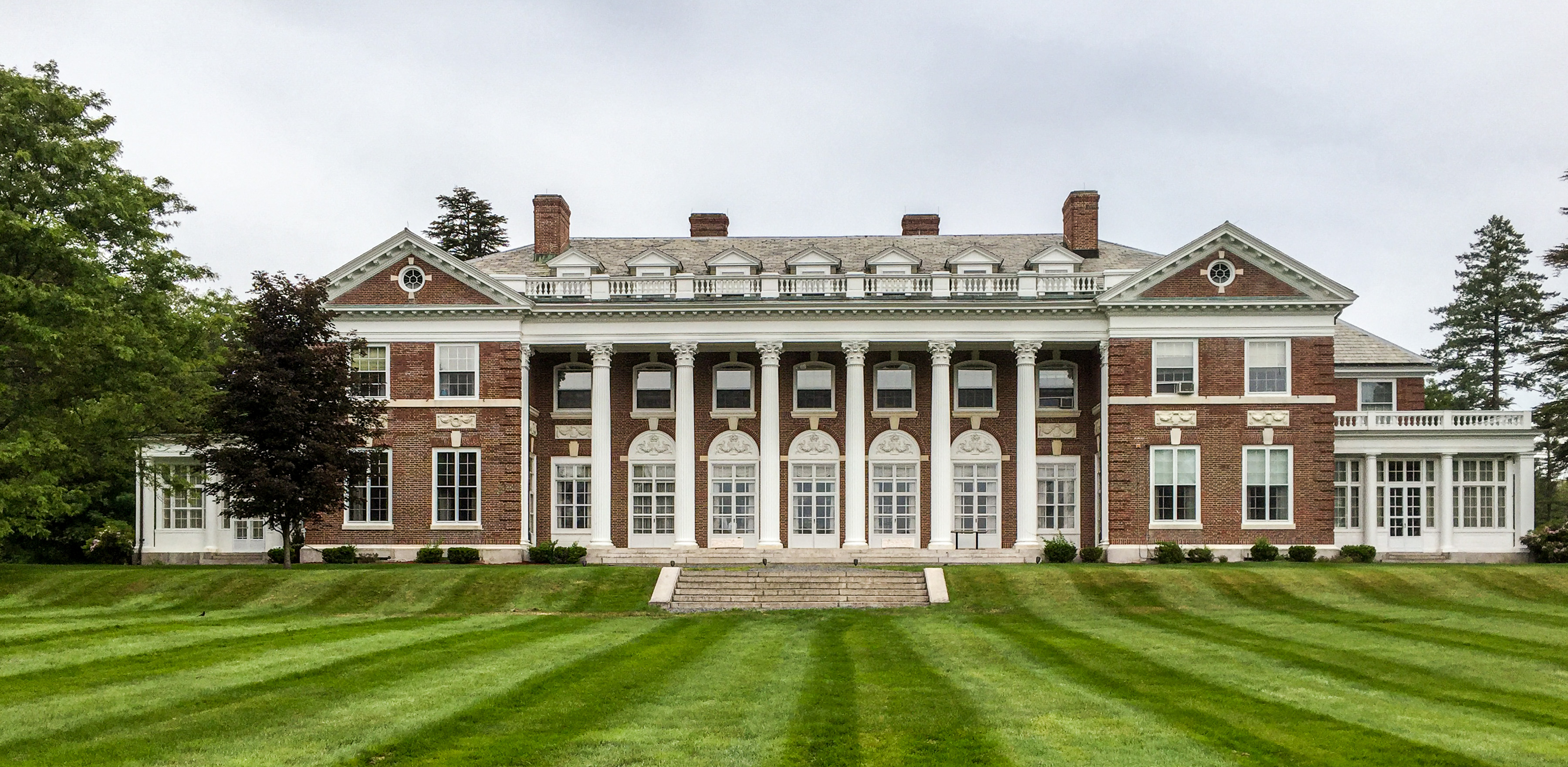
The Frederick Lothrop Ames Jr. estate (1905) in Easton, Massachusetts, designed in the Colonial Revival style

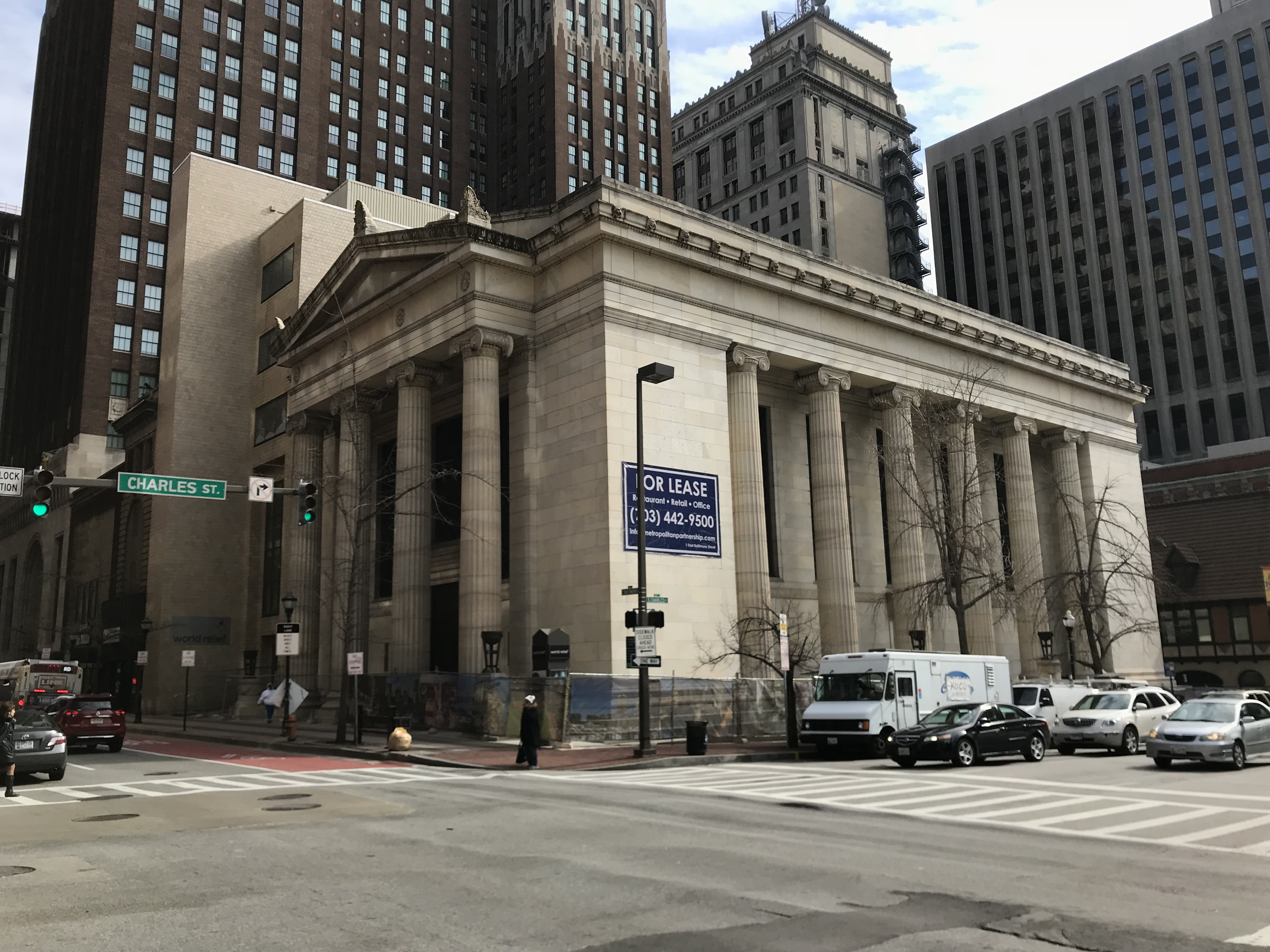
The Savings Bank of Baltimore Building (1907) in Baltimore, designed in the Neoclassical style

The Sidney L. Christie Federal Building (1910) in Huntington, West Virginia, designed in the Neoclassical style

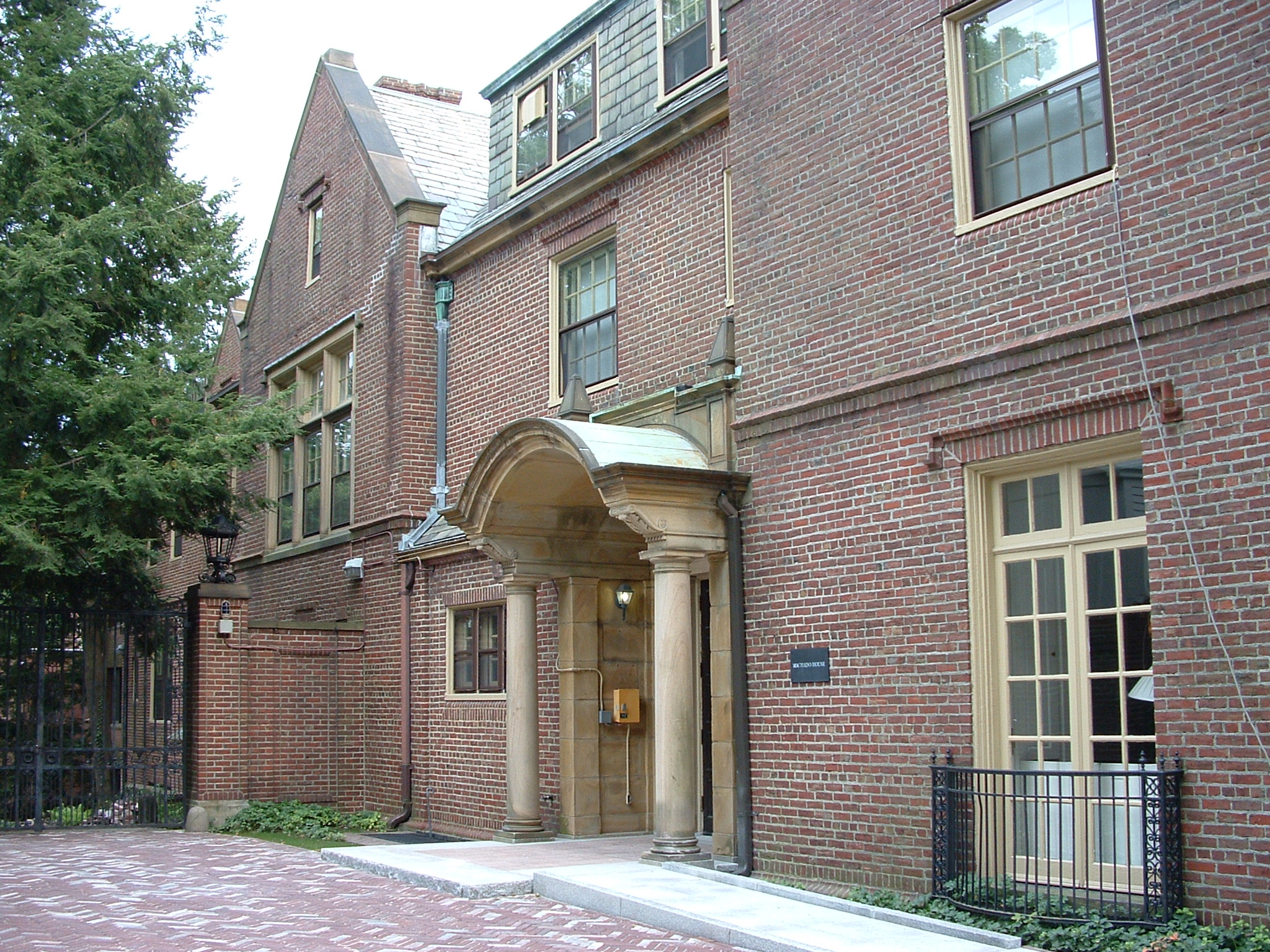
The Ellen Dexter Sharpe house (1912) in Providence, Rhode Island, designed in the Tudor Revival style

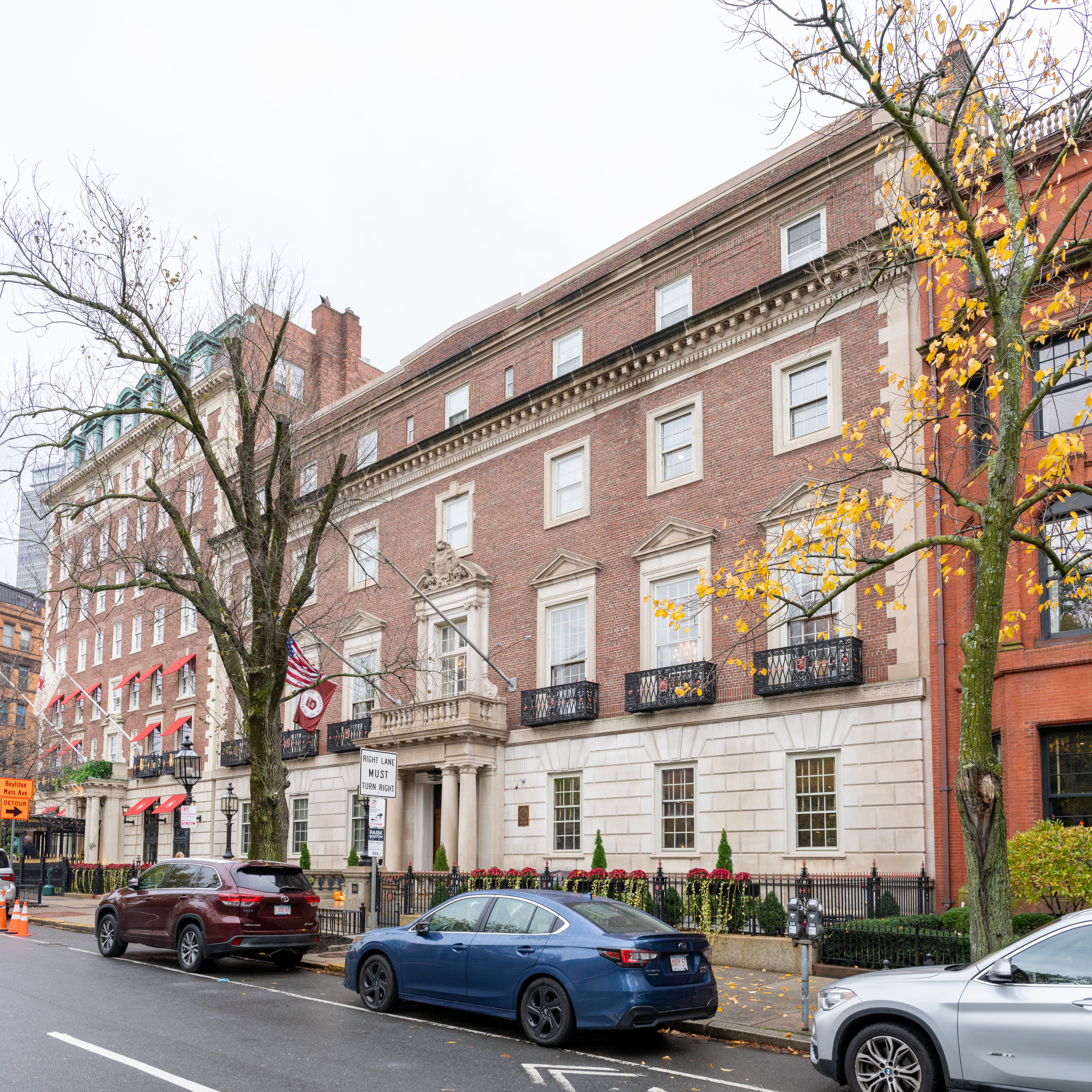
The Harvard Club of Boston (1913), designed in the Colonial Revival style

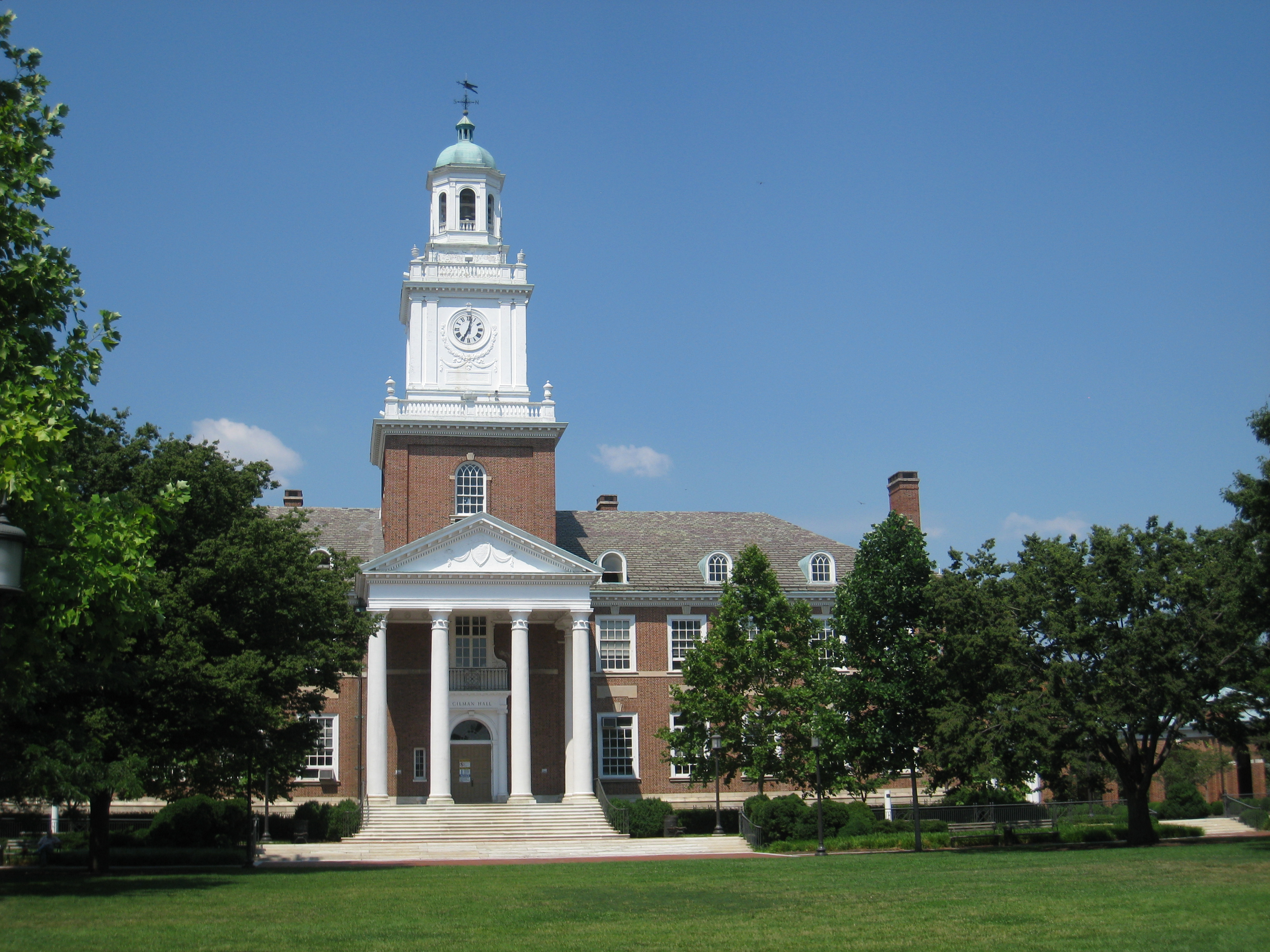
Gilman Hall (1915) of Johns Hopkins University, designed in the Colonial Revival style

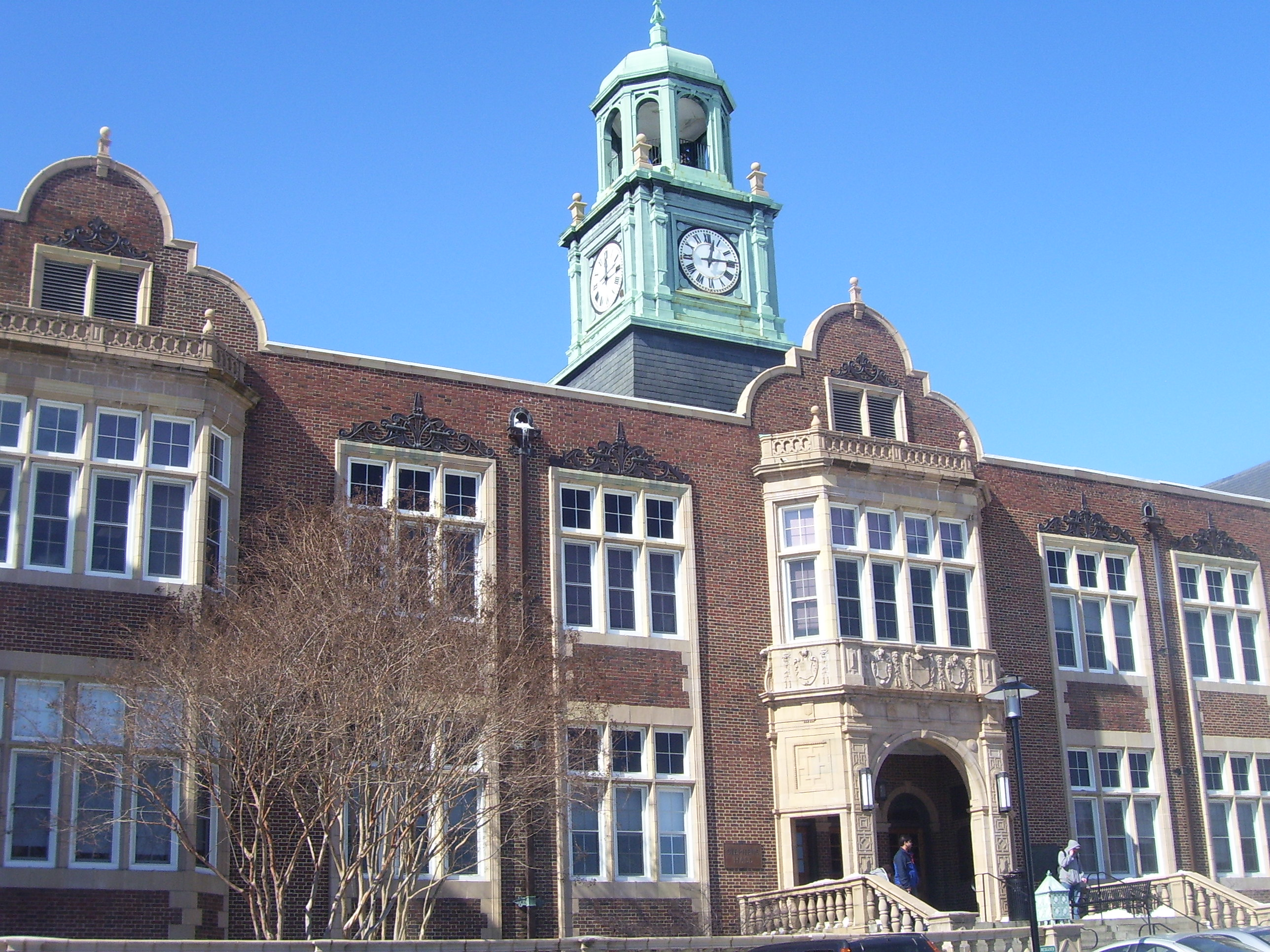
Stephens Hall (1915) of Towson University, designed in the Jacobethan style

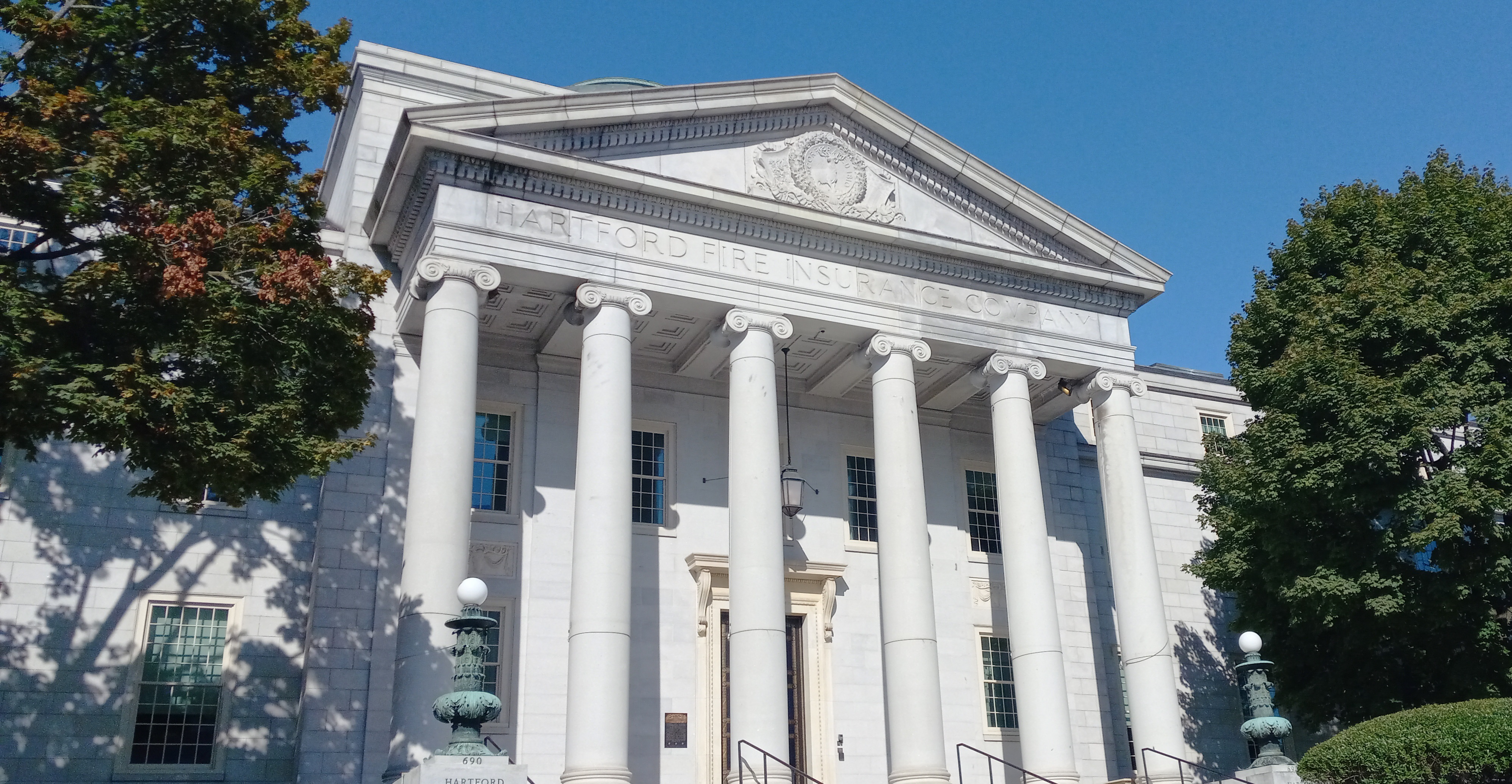
The headquarters of The Hartford (1921), designed in the Neoclassical style

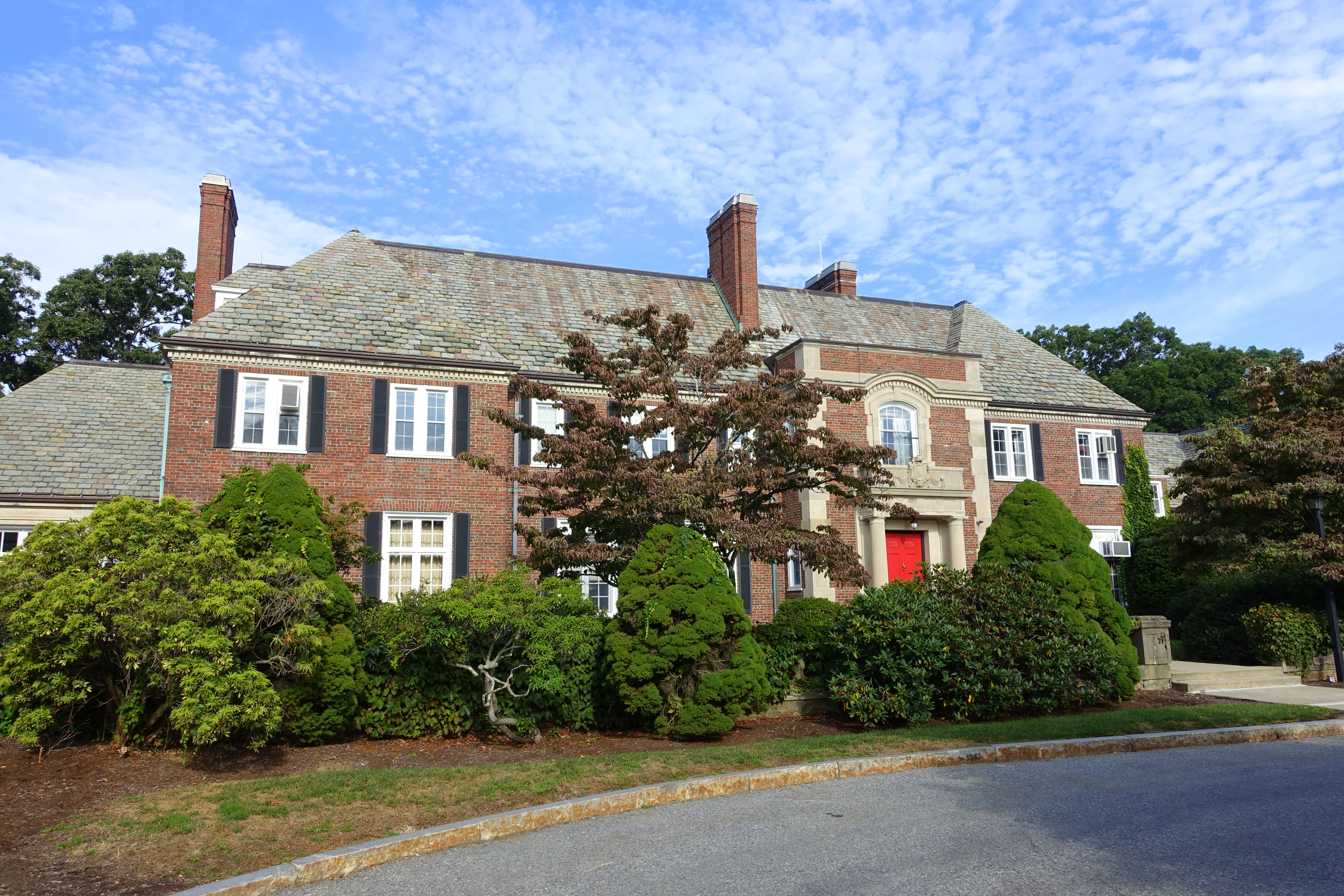
The George F. Schrafft house (1924) in Newton Centre, designed in the Colonial Revival style

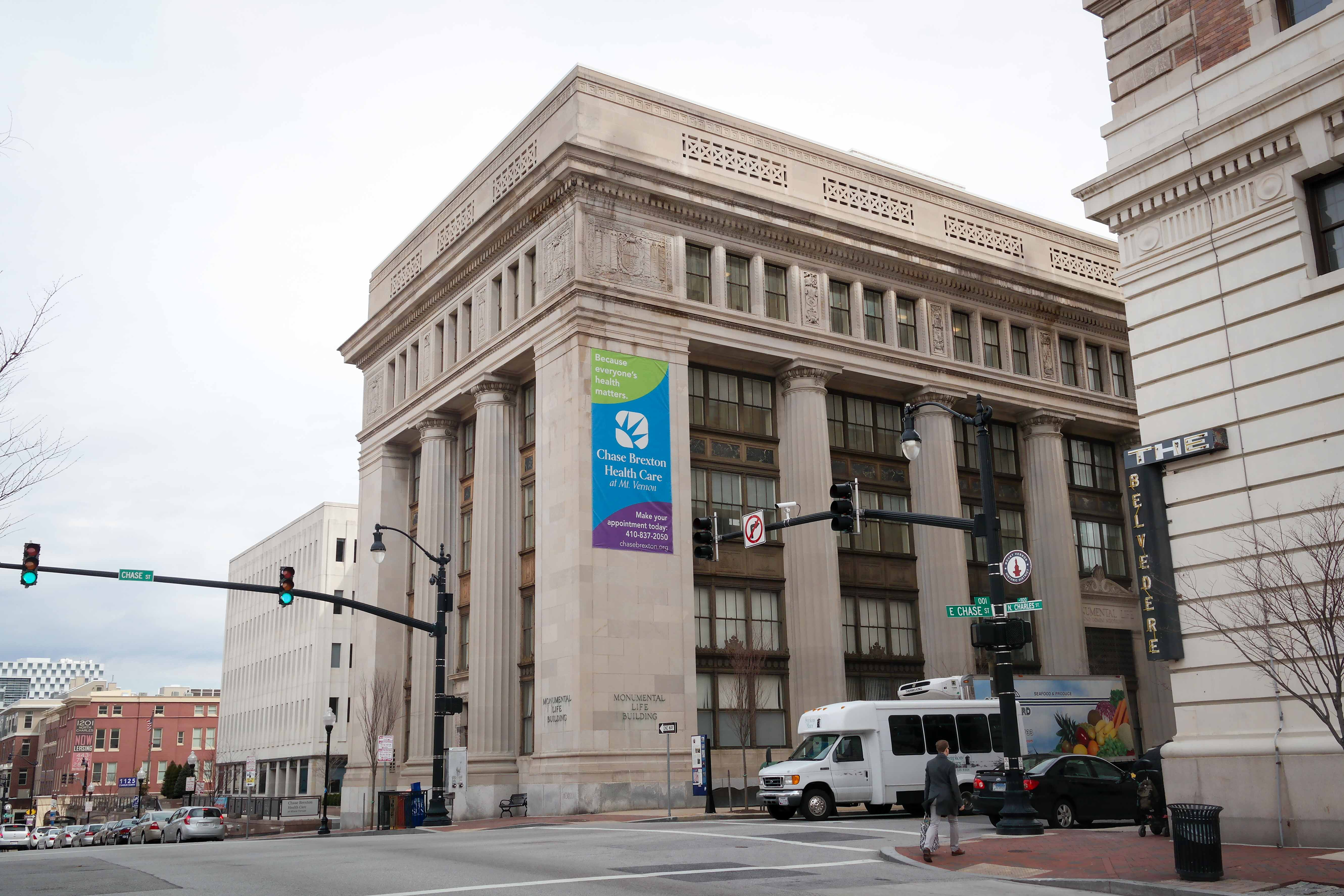
The Monumental Life Insurance Company Building (1926) in Baltimore, designed in the Neoclassical style

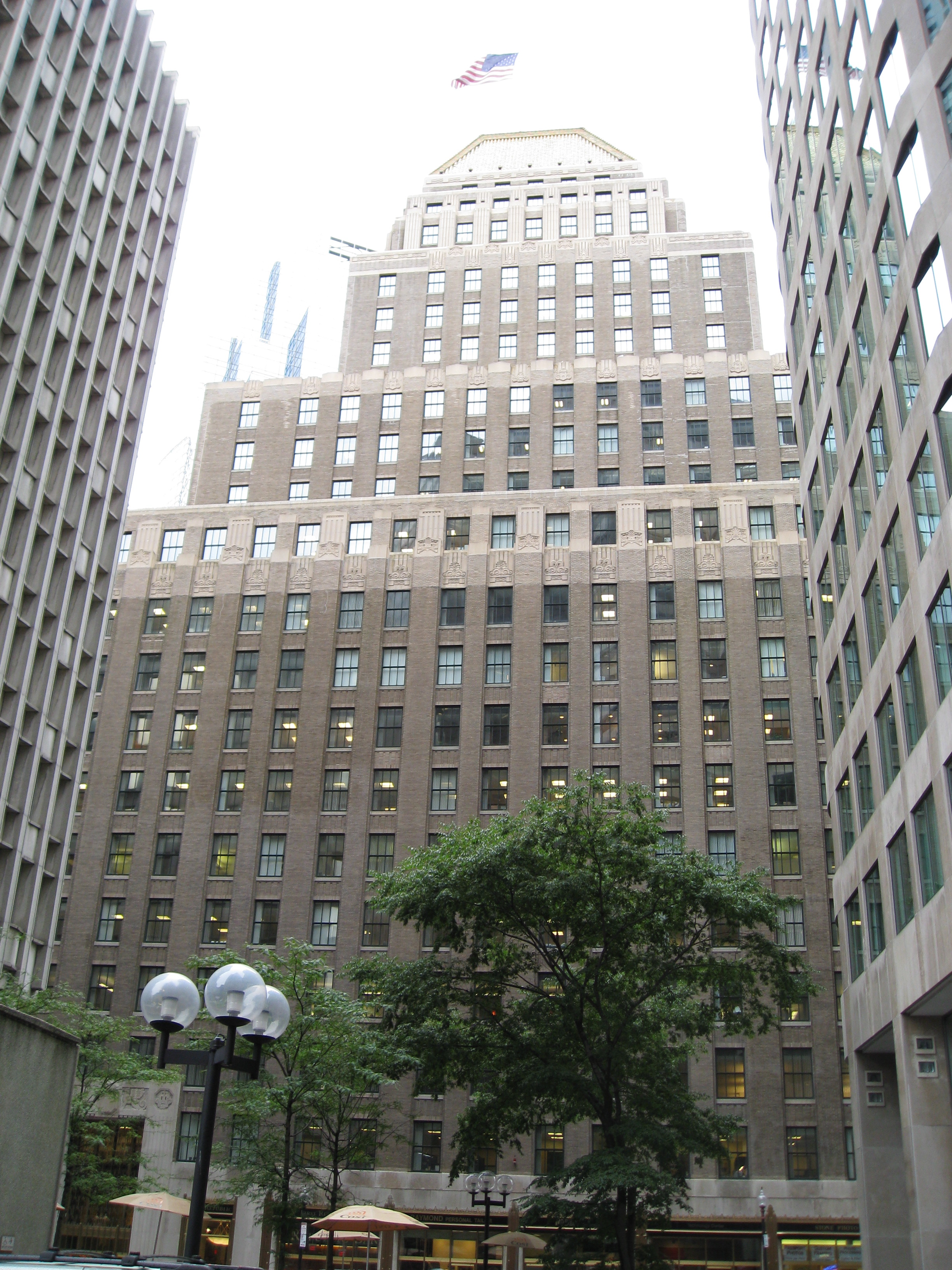
The United Shoe Machinery Corporation Building (1930) in Boston, designed in the Art Deco style

Parker, Thomas & Rice, known as Parker & Thomas before 1907, was an American architectural firm formed in 1900 by partners J. Harleston Parker and Douglas H. Thomas Jr. and later expanded to include Arthur W. Rice. It operated out of dual offices in Boston and Baltimore and was dissolved in 1933.

== History ==
The firm of Parker & Thomas was formed in Boston and Baltimore in 1900 by architects J. Harleston Parker and Douglas H. Thomas Jr., two young graduates of the Massachusetts Institute of Technology (MIT) and the Beaux-Arts de Paris. Parker and Thomas came from established Boston and Baltimore families and each managed the office in his home city. Early successes came in 1903 and 1906, respectively, when the firm won competitions to design the Sidney L. Christie Federal Building (1910, NRHP-listed) in Huntington, West Virginia, and to plan the new campus of Johns Hopkins University, Thomas's undergraduate alma mater. Planning and construction lagged and the only building the firm designed for the university was the monumental Gilman Hall (1915), not completed until shortly after Thomas's death.

In Boston during this time the firm designed the Tennis and Racquet Club (1904) in the Back Bay and country houses for Frederick Lothrop Ames Jr. (1905) in Easton and for Frederick Ayer (1907, demolished) in Beverly. In 1907 the partnership was reorganized as Parker, Thomas & Rice to include Arthur W. Rice, an older architect who was the surviving partner of the Boston firm of Peters & Rice. During the next few years the work of the Boston office included the Harvard Club of Boston (1913) in the Back Bay and the Essex County Club (1914) in Manchester-by-the-Sea, social clubs for the Boston Brahmin elite. In June 1915 Thomas died after accidentally driving his car into a ditch. To make up for this loss, Parker and Rice invited Robert E. Lee Taylor, a Norfolk, Virginia, architect and fellow MIT graduate to lead the Baltimore office. During the next twelve year period, the most important work completed in Boston was the John Hancock Building (1922); in Baltimore, the Forest Park High School (1924, demolished). In 1924 the Hancock Building was awarded the second Harleston Parker Medal, which Parker had endowed in 1921, by the Boston Society of Architects.

In 1927 the partnership was reorganized, separating the Boston and Baltimore offices after 27 years. Parker and Rice continued the Boston office under the old name while Taylor and D. K. Este Fisher, a partner since 1924, continued the Baltimore office as the independent firm of Taylor & Fisher. The major work of the firm's final years was the United Shoe Machinery Corporation Building (1930, NRHP-listed), a notable example of Art Deco architecture which was then the tallest privately-owned building in Boston. Parker died in May 1930 as the United Shoe building was underway; Rice retired in 1933 and died in January 1938.

== Legacy ==
In 1913, critic Herbert Croly described the partners of Parker, Thomas & Rice as being notable in their application of Beaux-Arts architectural principles to their work, principally in the Colonial Revival style. Their work was contrasted with contemporary architecture firms such as Carrère & Hastings which maintained the bombastic style of the Beaux-Arts in addition to its principles of planning and was summed up as being simply in "persistent good taste."

Employees of Parker & Thomas and Parker, Thomas & Rice included Henry Bailey Alden and Franklin H. Hutchins.

A number of their works are listed on the United States National Register of Historic Places.

== Architectural works ==
- 1900: A.D. Club, Cambridge, Massachusetts
- 1901: Alex. Brown & Sons Building, Baltimore
  - NRHP-listed
- 1902: Mills Building, Washington, DC
  - Demolished in 1964 for the second Mills Building, completed in 1966
- 1903: Belvedere Hotel, Baltimore
  - NRHP-listed
- 1903: John Whitridge Williams house, "Ram Point," Westerly, Rhode Island
  - NRHP-listed
- 1904: Tennis and Racquet Club, Back Bay, Boston
- 1905: Frederick Lothrop Ames Jr. estate, "Stone House Hill," Easton, Massachusetts
  - Now (2026) Donahue Hall of Stonehill College
- 1905: Bourne High School (former), Bourne, Massachusetts
  - NRHP-listed
- 1905: Fenway Studios, Fenway–Kenmore, Boston
  - A National Historic Landmark, also NRHP-listed
- 1905: Rosenfeld Building, Baltimore
  - Contributes to the NRHP-listed Heiser, Rosenfeld, and Strauss Buildings complex
- 1905: William D. Sawyer house, Milwaukee
  - Designed by Parker & Thomas, architects, with Buemming & Dick, associate architects; contributes to the NRHP-listed North Point South Historic District
- 1906: B&O Railroad Headquarters Building, Baltimore
  - Designed by Herbert D. Hale and Parker & Thomas, associated architects, with Henry G. Morse, associate architect
- 1906: William Finney house, "Little Greenwood," Churchville, Maryland
  - Contributes to the NRHP-listed Finney Houses Historic District
- 1906: National Bank of Commerce Building, Norfolk, Virginia
  - The tallest building in Norfolk until the construction of Icon Norfolk (1967); demolished in 1988
- 1907: Frederick Ayer estate, "Avalon," Beverly, Massachusetts
  - Demolished
- 1907: Savings Bank of Baltimore Building, Baltimore
- 1907: Tarratine Club, Bangor, Maine
  - Contributes to the NRHP-listed Great Fire of 1911 Historic District
- 1908: Lincoln Center School (former), Lincoln, Massachusetts
  - Now (2026) the Lincoln Town Officers; contributes to the NRHP-listed Lincoln Center Historic District
- 1909: R. H. Stearns Building, Downtown Crossing, Boston
  - NRHP-listed
- 1910: Sidney L. Christie Federal Building, Huntington, West Virginia
  - NRHP-listed
- 1910: Gilman School, Baltimore
- 1910: Union Boat Club, Beacon Hill, Boston
- 1912: Columbian Life Building, Downtown Crossing, Boston
- 1912: Hansa Haus, Baltimore
  - NRHP-listed
- 1912: Ellen Dexter Sharpe house, Providence, Rhode Island
  - Since 1989 Brown University's Antonio Machado House, or Casa Machado
- 1913: Harvard Club of Boston, Back Bay, Boston
- 1914: Essex County Club, Manchester, Massachusetts
- 1915: Gilman Hall, Johns Hopkins University, Baltimore
- 1915: Stephens and Newell Halls, Towson University, Towson, Maryland
- 1916: 39 West Lexington, Baltimore
- 1919: Lincoln Street development, Bath, Maine
  - A United States Housing Corporation development, designed by Loring Underwood, planner, and Parker, Thomas & Rice, architects
- 1919: George F. Lindsay House, Saint Paul, Minnesota
- 1921: The Hartford headquarters, Hartford, Connecticut
  - Designed by Edwin Sherrill Dodge and Parker, Thomas & Rice, architects
- 1922: John Hancock Building, Back Bay, Boston
  - Recipient of the second Harleston Parker Medal in 1924; enlarged in 1928
- 1924: Chamber of Commerce Building, Financial District, Boston
  - Demolished to make way for 100 Federal Street
- 1924: Forest Park High School, Baltimore
  - Demolished
- 1924: George F. Schrafft house, Newton Centre, Massachusetts
  - Now home to the Rappaport Center for Law and Public Policy
- 1926: Boston Five Cents Savings Bank Building, Downtown Crossing, Boston
  - Enlarged in 1972 by Kallmann & McKinnell
- 1926: Monumental Life Insurance Company Building, Baltimore
- 1927: Boston Consolidated Gas Company Building, Back Bay, Boston
- 1927: Leakin Hall, Peabody Institute, Baltimore
- 1928: First English Lutheran Church, Guilford, Baltimore
- 1929: Henry Dexter Sharpe and Mary Elizabeth Sharpe house, Providence, Rhode Island
  - Mrs. Sharpe, a self-educated landscape architect, planned the house's grounds; since 1985 Brown University's Rochambeau House
- 1930: United Shoe Machinery Corporation Building, Financial District, Boston
  - Designed by Parker, Thomas & Rice, architects, with Henry Bailey Alden, associate architect; NRHP-listed
- 1931: John R. Macomber estate, "Raceland," Framingham, Massachusetts
  - Originally built in 1925 and burned in 1930; rebuilt in a similar style but on an enlarged scale
