= J. Harleston Parker =

American architect (1873–1930)

- c. 1918
- Born: John Harleston Parker; November 27, 1872; Boston, Massachusetts, US
- Died: May 5, 1930 (aged 57); Boston, Massachusetts, US
- Education: Harvard University; Massachusetts Institute of Technology; École des Beaux-Arts
- Occupation: Architect
- Spouse: Edith Value Stackpole (m. 1904)
- Children: 4

John Harleston Parker (November 27, 1872 – May 5, 1930) was an American architect active in Boston, Massachusetts.

== Biography ==
At Harvard, c. 1893

Parker was born in Boston on November 27, 1872. He graduated from Harvard University in 1893, then studied architecture at the Massachusetts Institute of Technology and, after a further four years at the École des Beaux-Arts in Paris, took his degree in 1899. In 1900, he formed the firm of Parker & Thomas in Boston with Douglas H. Thomas Jr., which later in 1907 added Arthur Wallace Rice to become Parker, Thomas & Rice. As head of the firm, he designed many notable buildings and served as chairman of the Boston Art Commission.

In 1921, he established the "Harleston Parker Medal" in memory of his father, awarded annually by the Boston Society of Architects and City of Boston to recognize "such architects as shall have, in the opinion of the Boston Society of Architects for any private citizen, association, corporation, or public authority, the most beautiful piece of architecture, building, monument or structure within the limits of the City of Boston or of the Metropolitan Parks District".

He married Edith Value Stackpole in Nahant, Massachusetts on September 12, 1904, and they had four children.

Parker died at his home in Boston on May 5, 1930.

== Selected works ==
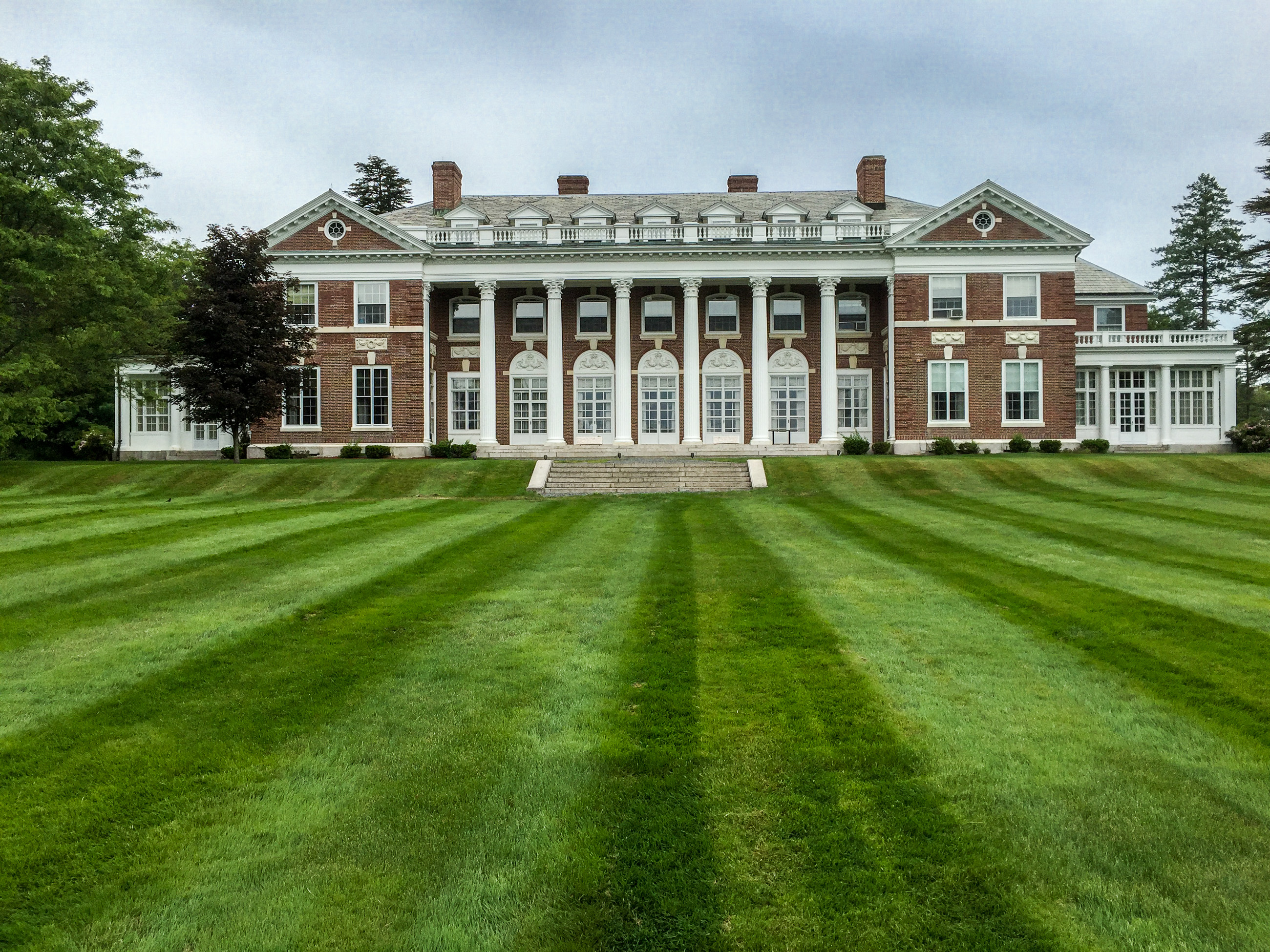
A 1905 portrait by Parker of Stone Hill House, home of Frederick Lothrop Ames Jr. and now part of Stonehill College

A number of their works are listed on the U.S. National Register of Historic Places, maintained by the National Park Service of the U.S. Department of the Interior.

=== As Parker & Thomas ===
- Alex Brown Building (1901), 135 East Baltimore Street at North Calvert Street, (southwest corner), Baltimore, (Parker & Thomas), NRHP-listed
- Belvedere Hotel (1903), 1 East Chase Street off North Charles Street, Baltimore, (Parker & Thomas), NRHP-listed
- Tennis and Racquet Club, (1904), Boston. (Parker & Thomas)
- Baltimore & Ohio Railroad Building (1904-1906), 2 North Charles Street at West Baltimore Street, (northwest corner), Baltimore, (Parker & Thomas), with Herbert D. Hale and Henry G. Morse. Now the Hotel Monaco Baltimore.
- Stone House Hill House (1905), mansion of Frederick Lothrop Ames Jr., later part of Stonehill College
- Rosenfeld Building, (1905), 32-42 South Paca Street, Baltimore, (Parker & Thomas), NRHP-listed
- Fenway Studios (1905-1906), 30 Ipswich Street, Boston, (Parker & Thomas), NRHP-listed
- Finney Houses Historic District (1906), Glenville Road. near junction with MD 155, near Churchville, Maryland in Harford County, (Parker & Thomas), NRHP-listed
- World Relief Headquarters (1907), (former Savings Bank of Baltimore Building, founded 1818), East Baltimore Street at North Charles Street, (southeast corner), Baltimore (Parker & Thomas)
- U.S. Post Office and Courthouse, (1905-1907), 9th Street and 5th Avenue, Huntington, West Virginia, (Parker & Thomas), NRHP-listed
- Maryland Casualty Building, of the Maryland Casualty Company, (1912), also known as "The Tower Building" with landmark roof tip clock, 400 block East Baltimore Street at Holliday Street, (northwest corner), Baltimore, razed early 1980s, a parking lot still exists.

=== As Parker, Thomas & Rice ===
- R. H. Stearns Building, (1908-1909), 140 Tremont Street, Boston, (Parker, Thomas & Rice), NRHP-listed
- The Union Boat Club Boathouse, (1908), 75 Embankment Road, Boston, (Parker, Thomas & Rice)
- The Union Boat Club, (1910), 144 Chestnut Street, Boston, (Parker, Thomas & Rice)
- Baltimore Gas and Electric Company Building (1916), of old Consolidated Gas, Electric Light and Power Company, (later renamed Baltimore Gas and Electric Company - founded 1816), 39 West Lexington Street, at North Liberty/Sharp Street/Hopkins Place, (northeast corner), Baltimore, (Parker, Thomas and Rice), NRHP-listed
- John Hancock Building, (1922), The Stephen L. Brown Building, 197 Clarendon Street, Boston, (Parker, Thomas and Rice)
- United Shoe Machinery Corporation Building, (1929), 138-164 Federal Street, Boston, (Parker, Thomas & Rice), NRHP-listed
