= Arthur Rice =

Arthur Rice may refer to:

- Arthur Rice, 6th Baron Dynevor (1836–1911), British peer
- Arthur W. Rice (1869–1938), architect in Boston
