= John Hancock building =

The John Hancock building may refer to the following:

- John Hancock Center (875 North Michigan Avenue), Chicago, Illinois, United States
- John Hancock Building (multiple buildings), Boston, Massachusetts, United States
  - John Hancock Tower (200 Clarendon Street), Boston, Massachusetts, United States
  - Berkeley Building (200 Berkeley Street), Boston, Massachusetts, United States
