= Arthur W. Rice =

American architect (1869–1938)

- Born: July 18, 1869; Roxbury, Massachusetts
- Died: March 23, 1938 (aged 68); Milton, Massachusetts
- Education: Massachusetts Institute of Technology
- Occupation: Architect
- Spouse: Martha Davis Brewer
- Partner(s): William York Peters; J. Harleston Parker and Douglas H. Thomas, Jr.
- Parent(s): George Woods Rice and Adalaide Walker
- Practice: Peters and Rice; Parker, Thomas & Rice

Arthur Wallace Rice, FAIA (July 8, 1869 – March 23, 1938) was a prominent architect in Boston during the early 20th Century as a major contributor to the Beaux-Arts architectural movement in America. In his early years in partnership with William Y. Peters, he focused on large residences in the Back Bay neighborhood of Boston, primarily in the Georgian Revival style. As a partner in the firm of Parker, Thomas & Rice, he produced a number of landmark buildings and early skyscrapers in the Beaux-Arts style. Near the end of his career, his 1929 United Shoe Machinery Corporation Building in Boston was notable as one of the first skyscrapers in America to be built in the Art-Deco style that would become very popular in the following two decades.

== Early life and education ==
Arthur W. Rice was born 18 July 1869 in Boston to George Woods Rice (14 July 1828 – 14 November 1882) and Adelaide (Walker) Rice. The elder Rice was born in South Boston to David Rice and Hanna Thompson (Bangs) Rice. George Woods Rice was President of the Massachusetts Loan and Trust Company in Boston. Arthur Wallace Rice’s mother, Adelaide Walker, was born 21 October 1830 to Lemuel and Mary I. Walker in Boston, and she married G.W. Rice on 7 September 1853 in Roxbury. Adelaide (Walker) Rice died 27 August 1917 in Boston. Rice attended the Massachusetts Institute of Technology in Cambridge, MA, earning a degree in architecture in 1891. In the next year, he studied architecture in Paris under the direction of famed architect Henri Duray at the prestigious École des Beaux-Arts, returning to Boston in late 1892.

== Architectural career ==
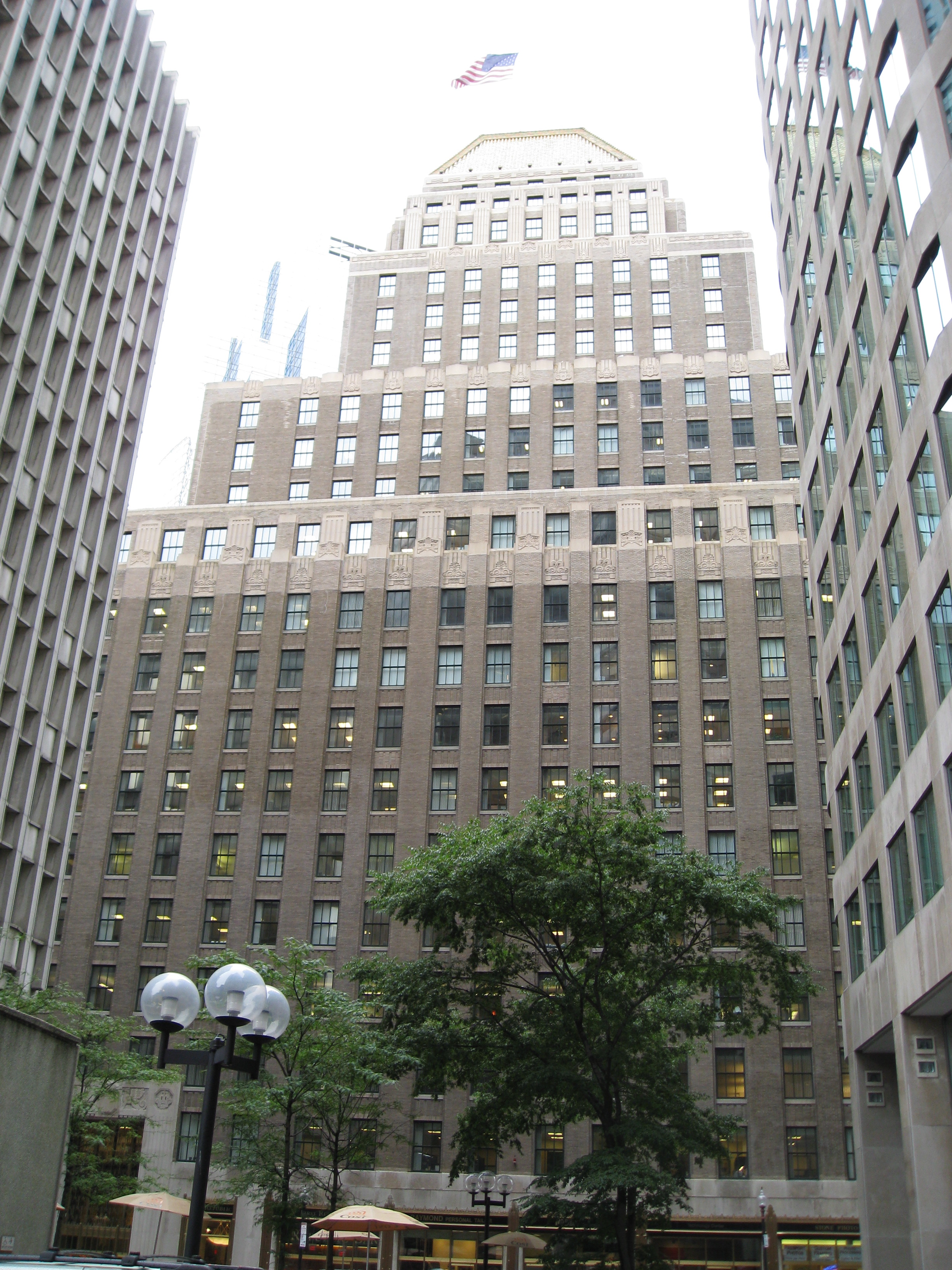
The United Shoe Machinery Company Building in Boston is one of Arthur Wallace Rice's later architectural works that pioneered the Art Deco style in America

Rice began his career as a junior architect with architectural firms in Boston, and later became a partner with William Y. Peters to form the firm of Peters and Rice in 1898, with offices in the Pemburton Building on Pemburton Square in Boston. They specialized in large residences, particularly in the Back Bay of Boston, Brookline and in the suburbs. Rice's early work included the Georgian Revival Phi Delta Theta House (1900) at 97 Bay State Road, and the old Weld Mansion (1900) at 149 Bay State Road, both in Boston Back Bay. Rice became the sole manager of the firm in 1903 when Peters retired from the practice, and Rice began work with Beaux-Art design. His first major Beaux-Art work was the remodel of the Walter Cabot Baylies House (1905) at 5 Commonwealth Ave. also in the Back Bay. Rice followed up the same year by his Beaux-Arts design of the Jones, McDuffee and Stratton Company Building (1905) in downtown Boston that later became incorporated into the Filene's Department Store building designed by Daniel Burnham. He also became an Associate of the American Institute of Architects (AIA) in 1905, and later at the December 1912 meeting of the AIA in Washington, DC, he was elected by his peers as an AIA Fellow.

In 1900, Baltimore architect Douglas H. Thomas formed a partnership with J. Harleston Parker of Boston, and they maintained offices in their home cities operating under the name of Parker & Thomas. In 1907, Rice became a partner in the firm and the name was changed to Parker, Thomas & Rice, with main offices at 20 Beacon Street in Boston. The firm had a varied and distinguished practice in both Boston and Baltimore designing banks, hotels, educational, governmental, and commercial buildings, as well as large residences and exposition buildings. The firm’s work is described as traditional in style, deriving its forms from the French and English Renaissance, as well as classic Italian and Greek forms, with the influence of the Beaux-Arts movement evident in their work. The firm was responsible for the design of a number of major buildings around the country including: The R. H. Stearns Building (1909), at 140 Tremont St., Boston; Gilman Hall at Johns Hopkins University (1914); Baltimore Gas and Electric Company Building (1916); and the United Shoe Machinery Corporation Building (1929), at 138-164 Federal St. in Boston. Despite the death of his partners in 1915 (Thomas) and 1930 (Parker), Rice maintained the name of the firm as Parker, Thomas & Rice until his retirement in 1935.

== Family and genealogy ==
Arthur Wallace Rice married Martha D. Brewer in 1911 in Marion, Massachusetts. Martha Brewer was born in Honolulu, Hawaiian Islands on 23 April 1877, and she died in 1958 in Milton, Massachusetts. They had three children, Adelaide Rice Browne (b. 20 July 1912 in Boston; d. 21 Mar 1989); Martha Rice Crocker (b. 24 August 1914 in Milton; d. 3 Oct 1998), and Arthur Wallace Rice Jr. (b. 1 Nov 1915 in Milton; d. 17 Aug 1995 in Wareham, Massachusetts). Rice died on 24 March 1938 at his home in Milton. Arthur Wallace Rice was a direct patrilineal descendant of Edmund Rice an early immigrant to Massachusetts Bay Colony as follows.

- Arthur Wallace Rice, son of

- George Woods Rice (1828 – 1882)

- David Rice (1779 – 1830), son of
- Elijah Rice (1749 – 1827), son of
- Elijah Rice (1722 – 1818), son of

- Elisha Rice (1679 – 1761), son of
- Thomas Rice (1626 – 1681), son of

- Edmund Rice (1594 – 1663)
