= John Hancock Center (disambiguation) =

John Hancock Center usually refers to a skyscraper in Chicago at 875 North Michigan Avenue. It may also refer to:

- John Hancock Tower, the tallest building in Boston
- John Hancock Building, various headquarters of the John Hancock Insurance Company
