= George F. Lindsay House =

Historic house in Minnesota, United States

- Location: 294 Summit Avenue
- Area: Saint Paul, Minnesota
- Built: 1919
- Architect: Parker, Thomas & Rice
- Architectural style: Georgian Revival

The George F. Lindsay House is a historic home on Summit Avenue in Saint Paul, Minnesota, located at 294 Summit Avenue.

== History ==
The house was built in 1919 by George F. Lindsay and designed by architecture firm Parker, Thomas & Rice. Lindsay was a timber buyer for Weyerhaeuser. He was born in Iowa in 1871. The house is Georgian Revival in style and is one of the few historic mansions built of wood on Summit Avenue.

In 1932 the house was sold to Frederick K. Weyerhaeuser, the grandson of lumber baron Friedrich Weyerhäuser.

It was owned by author Garrison Keillor from 2008 to 2020. Keillor bought the house in 2008 for $2.15 million.
