= B&O Railroad Headquarters Building =

B&O Railroad Headquarters Building - Hotel Monaco
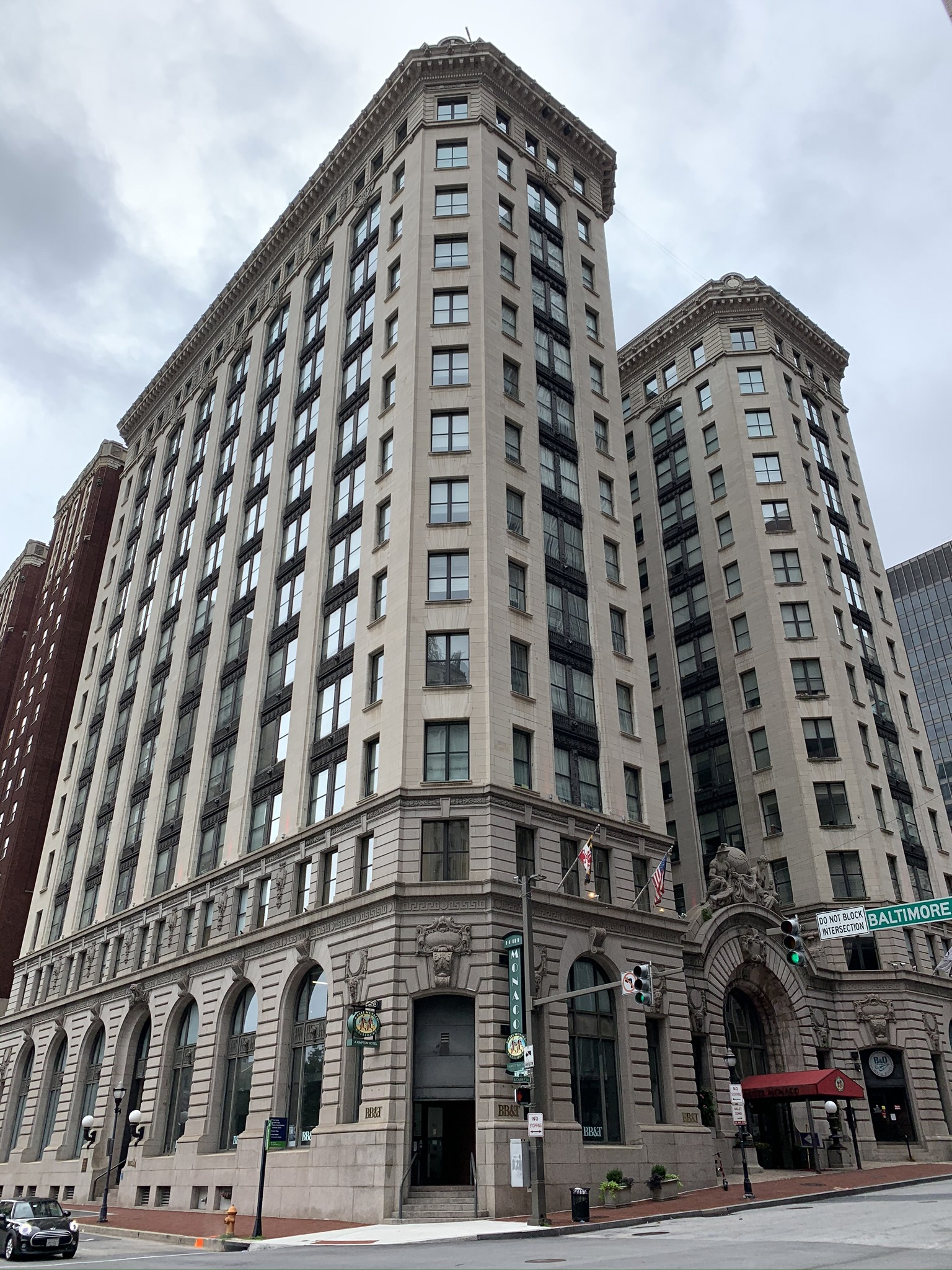
- B&O Headquarters Building, now Hotel Monaco, in Baltimore

- Location within Baltimore

General information
- Type: Mixed-use
- Architectural style: Beaux-Arts architecture
- Location: Baltimore, Maryland, U.S., 2 North Charles St.
- Coordinates: 39°17′23″N 76°36′58″W
- Completed: 1906

Technical details
- Floor count: 13

Design and construction
- Architects: Parker & Thomas assisted by Herbert D. Hale and Henry G. Morse

The B&O Railroad Headquarters Building is a historic office building at 2 North Charles Street in Baltimore, Maryland. It is a 13-story, 220-foot structure designed by the Boston and Baltimore-based architectural firm of Parker & Thomas, and constructed in 1904–1906.

== History ==
=== 20th century ===
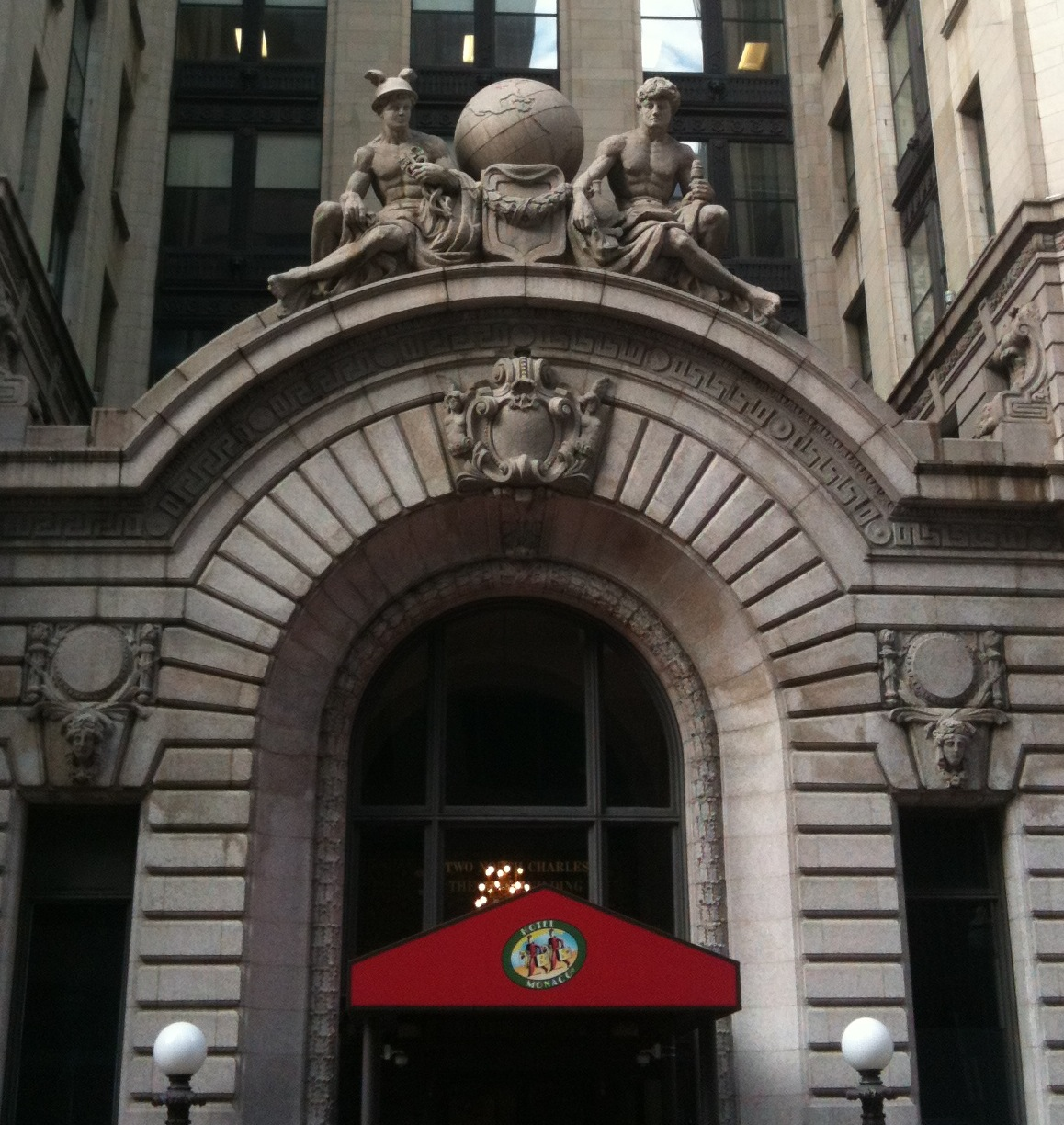
Mercury, the Roman god of commerce, (left) and an allegorical feature called Progress of Industry, (right) cradling a locomotive, adorn the front entrance

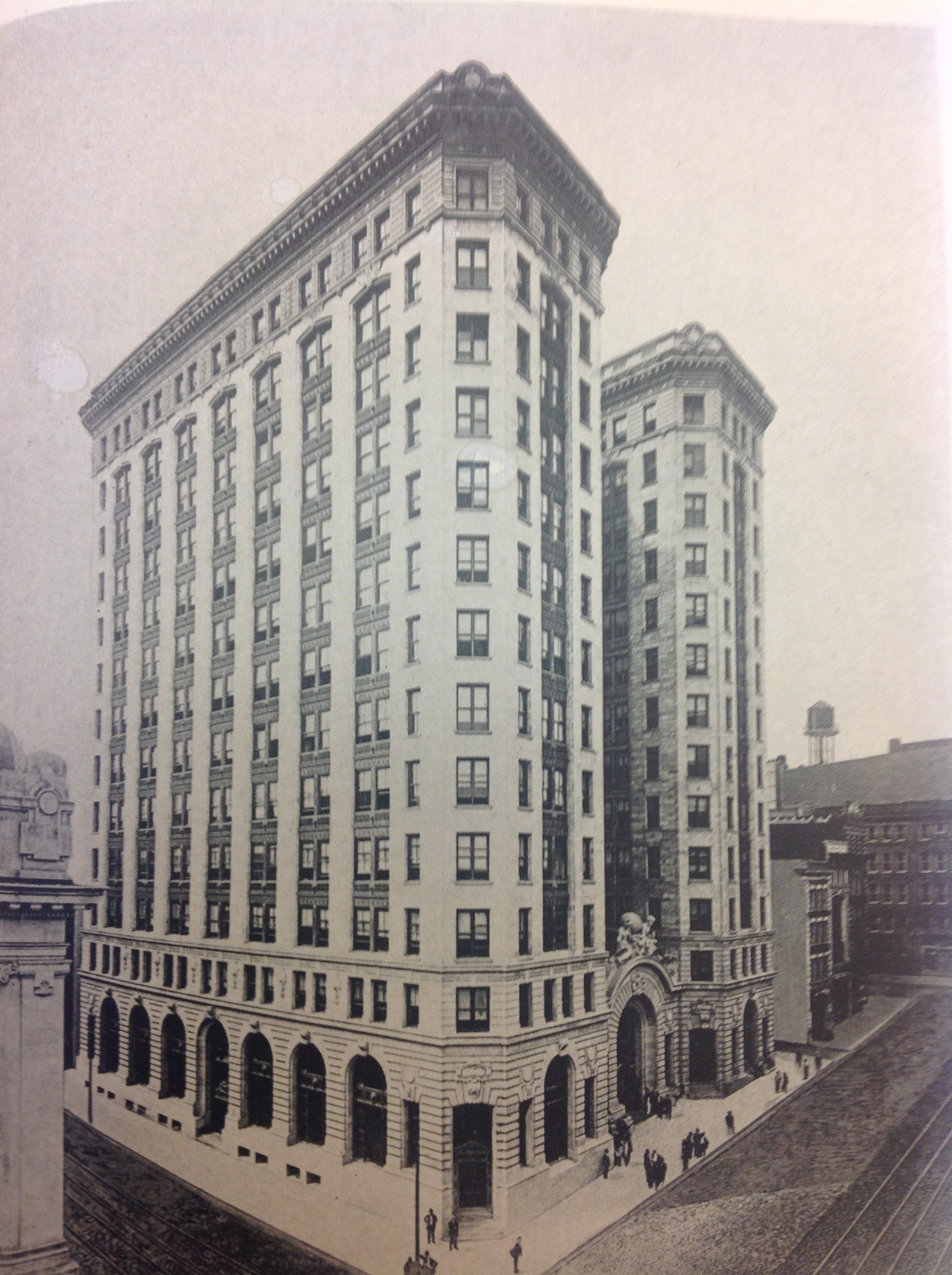
B&O Headquarters Building soon after the completion of construction in c. 1910

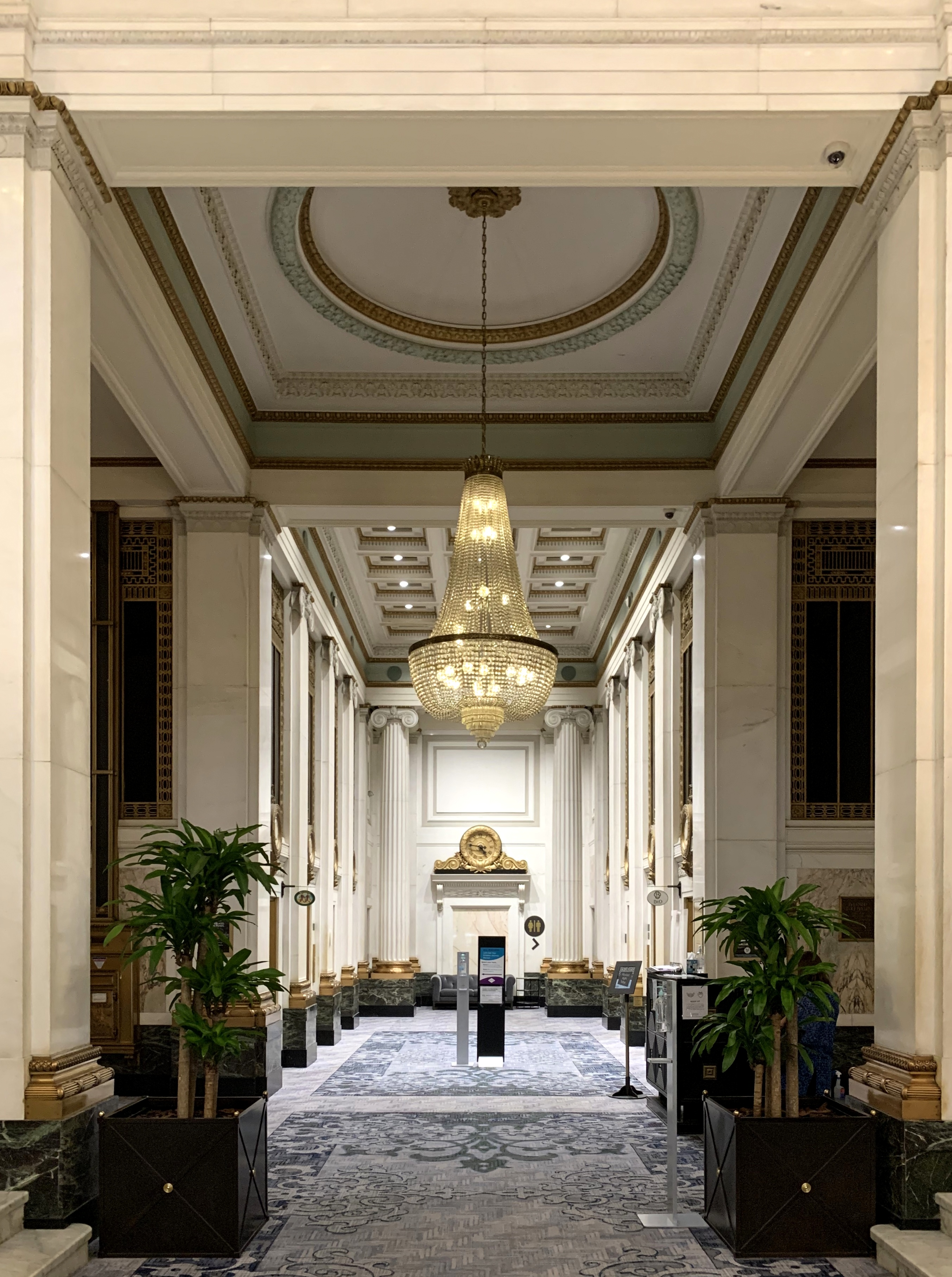
B&O Railroad Headquarters Building lobby

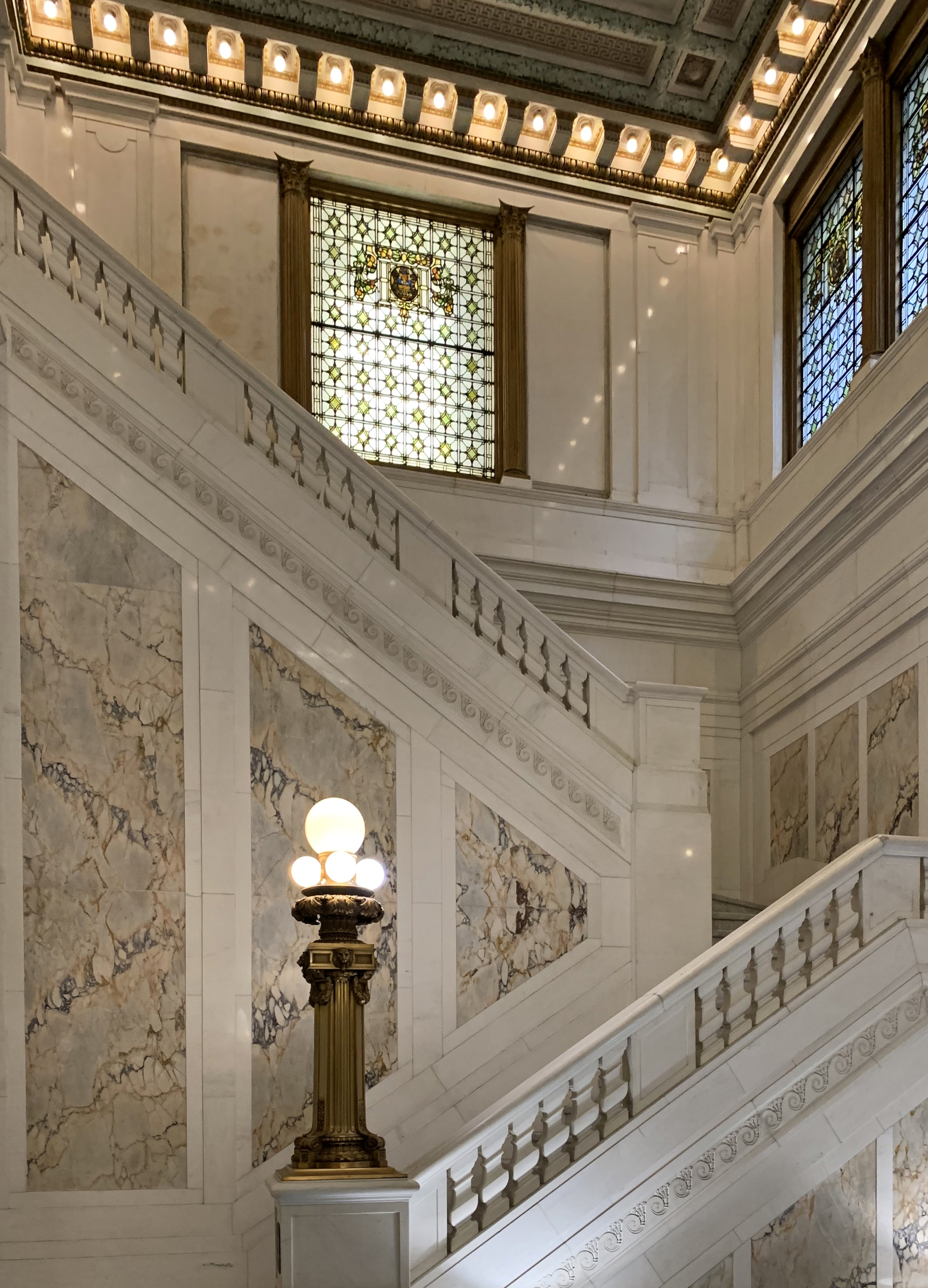
B&O Railroad Headquarters Building lobby stairway

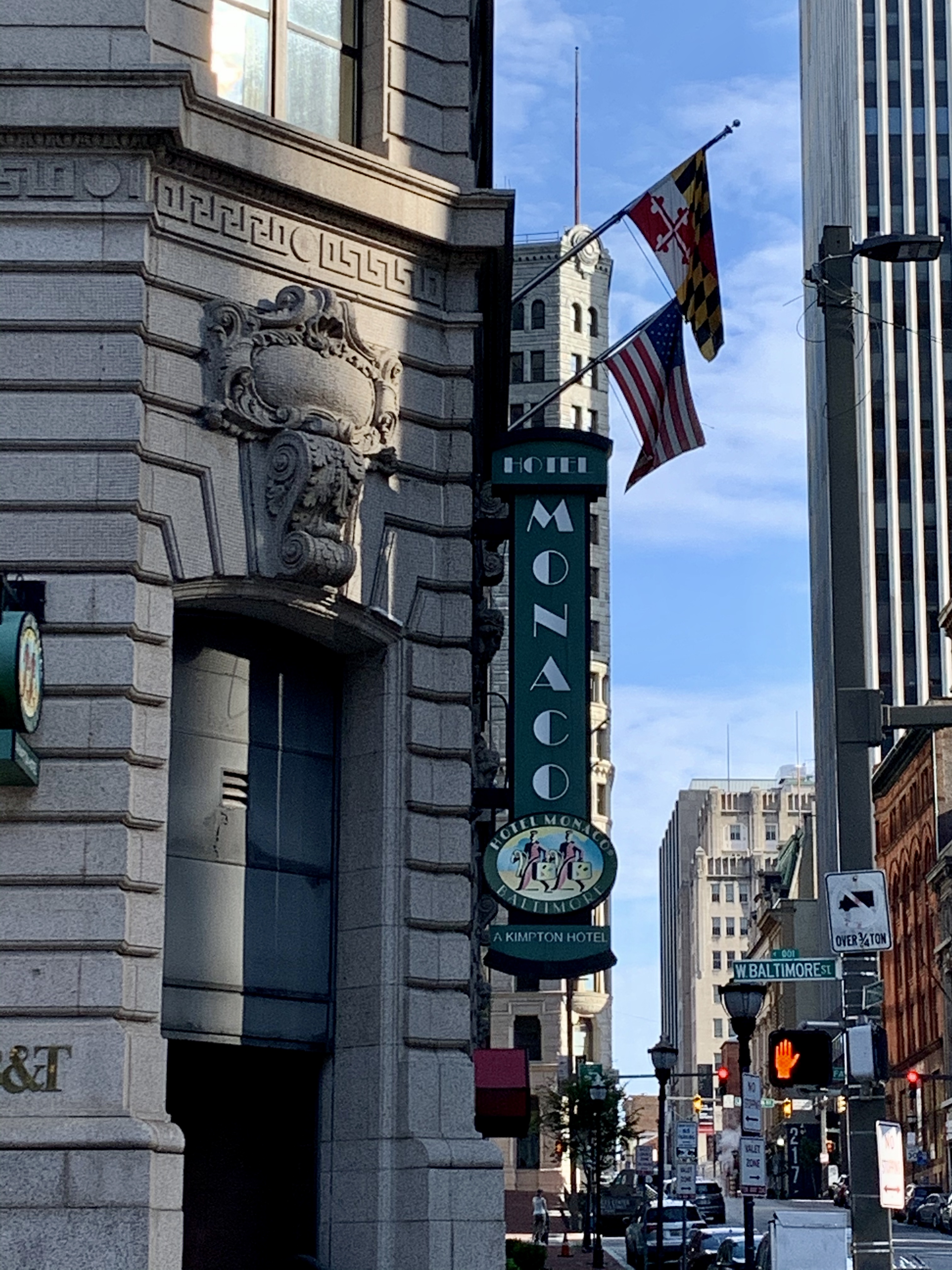
Hotel Monaco sign on the corner

According to B&O Railroad's summary of its history, "when the original Second Empire style headquarters on the corner of Baltimore and Calvert street was destroyed in the Great Baltimore Fire of 1904, Baltimore and Ohio Railroad executives decided to build a new 13 story steel-framed building two blocks west of the old site. The building's entrance is adorned by two sculptures: Mercury, the Roman god for commerce, and a figure named Progress of Industry, which holds a torch and a locomotive; Progress of Industry clearly invokes the company's position not only as an industry leader, but also the company's aspiration to be a vehicle of progress."

It was designed by the architectural firm of Parker and Thomas of Baltimore and Boston, assisted by Herbert D. Hale and Henry G. Morse, and built by the construction firm of the brothers W. W. and E. A. Wells of Chicago. The same group had successfully teamed up a couple of years earlier on the Belvedere Hotel, an eleven-story Beaux-Arts building, about one mile up N. Charles Street in the Mount Vernon area of downtown Baltimore.

"The 13-story office building, built in 1906, served as headquarters for the Baltimore & Ohio Railroad for 75 years. The building's beauty and elegance of its marbled lobbies, ornate stairs and Tiffany stained-glass windows became an instant landmark in downtown Baltimore and it symbolized the power and prestige of America's largest and oldest railroad." The impressive building includes seven different kinds of marble imported from six countries representing four continents. The first 3 floors of the exterior façade are clad in New Hampshire granite, while Bedford stone is utilized from the fourth floor and above. The trim is terra cotta tile. The building's H shape design provides for a large number of window offices. The ornate main lobby contains two white marble staircases, grand chandeliers and many decorative details.

As the building neared completion in 1906, The Baltimore Sun ran a glowing piece under the headline, A Palace for B. and O. - Headquarters a Monument to City's Progressiveness, "A model of architecture, with ornamentation and decorations, inside and out, of the richest and most up-to-date design, the new Baltimore and Ohio building, now nearing completion at the northwest corner of Baltimore and Charles Streets, opposite the new home of the Baltimore Sun, will be a lasting monument to Baltimore's progressiveness. Not only is it the largest office building in Maryland, and perhaps along the Atlantic Coast south of Philadelphia, but it ranks among the finest in the world in style and completeness." The article went on to relate the tremendous skill of the craftsmen, the gigantic size of the structure, including 1,600 windows, and the great number of employees, who would work there, 1,000 in all, 500 of whom could be fed at any one time in the company dining room.

When the B&O Headquarters Building was completed, it was the second tallest structure in Baltimore to the 16 story 249 foot Continental Trust Company Building, two blocks away at 201 East Baltimore St., which was constructed in 1900–1901 to designs prepared by the Chicago skyscraper architect D.H. Burnham and Company.

Oscar G. Murray was the president of the B&O Railroad when their new Headquarters Building opened in 1906. His 1914 will established a fund for his employees’ widows and orphans. It survives 100 years later and is administered today by the Baltimore Community Foundation.

The 13-story building was officially dedicated on September 12, 1906. The sculptures over the main entrance were designed by Boston-based firm John Evans & Co. According to a later occupant, "the figure of Mercury and an allegorical feature cradling a locomotive represent transportation and commerce."

The B&O Railroad Headquarters Building lies within the Baltimore Business and Government Historic District, which was listed on the National Register of Historic Places in 1987.

=== 21st century ===
In 2001, the City of Baltimore's Commission for Historical and Architectural Preservation and the Maryland Historical Trust designated the B&O Building one the city's ten most historically consequential buildings. The owner of the property, Baltimore and Charles Associates, went bankrupt in 2010 and the property was then subdivided into a "condominium regime" and Kimpton bought the hotel space and restaurant space for approximately $33 million and Kenwood Management Co. of Bethesda, purchased the office space for $1.3 million. Baltimore and Charles Associates, spent about $65 million to buy and renovate the B&O Building from 2007 to 2009. Philadelphia-based Arc Wheeler LLC, was the project's lead developer and at the time was also planning to redevelop the former McCormick & Co. spice plant site at Conway and Light streets downtown, which fell through.

The original $48 million acquisition and construction loan for the B&O Building was arranged by Philadelphia-based, BlueStone Real Estate Capital, a real estate investment bank.

The architect for the historic restoration and renovation project was RCG from Baltimore. The restoration received an Award of Excellence by the Maryland Society of American Institute of Architects and numerous other awards for historic preservation.

== Current usage ==
Since 2009, following a 3-year renovation, the B&O Headquarters Building has been a 202-room Hotel Monaco, a Kimpton property, the largest boutique hotel chain in the U.S., and houses the B&O American Brasserie. It also has three floors of office space and BB&T on the first floor. As configured currently it has 220,500 square feet of space. The hotel began another major renovation of its sleeping rooms, lobby, and restaurant in 2023.
