= John Hancock Building =

Building in Massachusetts, United States

Coordinates: 42°20′54.22″N 71°04′30.07″W

Four buildings in Boston, Massachusetts, have been known as the "John Hancock Building." All were built by the John Hancock Insurance companies. References to the John Hancock building usually refer to the 60-story, sleek glass building on Clarendon Street also known as the John Hancock Tower or Hancock Place.

== 176–178 Devonshire Street ==
The first John Hancock Building was built on Devonshire Street in 1891. It was designed by William G. Preston. On October 2, 1919, the building was purchased by the First National Bank of Boston. In 1922, it was one of the buildings torn down to make way for the new First National Bank building. This building was torn down in 1971 and replaced by One Federal Street.

== 120 Franklin Street, Stone & Webster Building ==
In 1909, John Hancock began work on a new addition to the building on the corner of Franklin and Devonshire Streets. The addition was designed by Shepley, Rutan and Coolidge in the French Renaissance architecture style. The "H type" design allowed for almost every office to have outside windows. Each floor contained marble flooring and wainscoting as well as a fireproof bank vault. The Wells Bros. Co. of New York City were the general contractors. John Hancock occupied the top three floors of the ten-story building and the Library Bureau, Eliot National Bank of Boston, and E. H. Rollins & Sons were among the first tenants. The addition gave the building frontage on Devonshire Street (176–200 Devonshire St.), Franklin Street (120 Franklin St.), and Federal Street (49–75 Federal Street). On January 3, 1920, the remainder of the building was purchased by Massachusetts Trust Company, which renamed it the Massachusetts Trust Company Building. In 1926 the building was purchased by Stone & Webster and became known as the Stone & Webster Building. In 1965, the First National Bank purchased the building with plans to construct their new headquarters there. The Stone & Webster Building was torn down once Stone & Webster moved out. The property was acquired by National Shawmut Bank, which constructed a temporary building to aid in their transition to One Federal Street. The temporary building was torn down and replaced by One Federal Street.

== 197 Clarendon, Stephen L. Brown Building (1922) ==
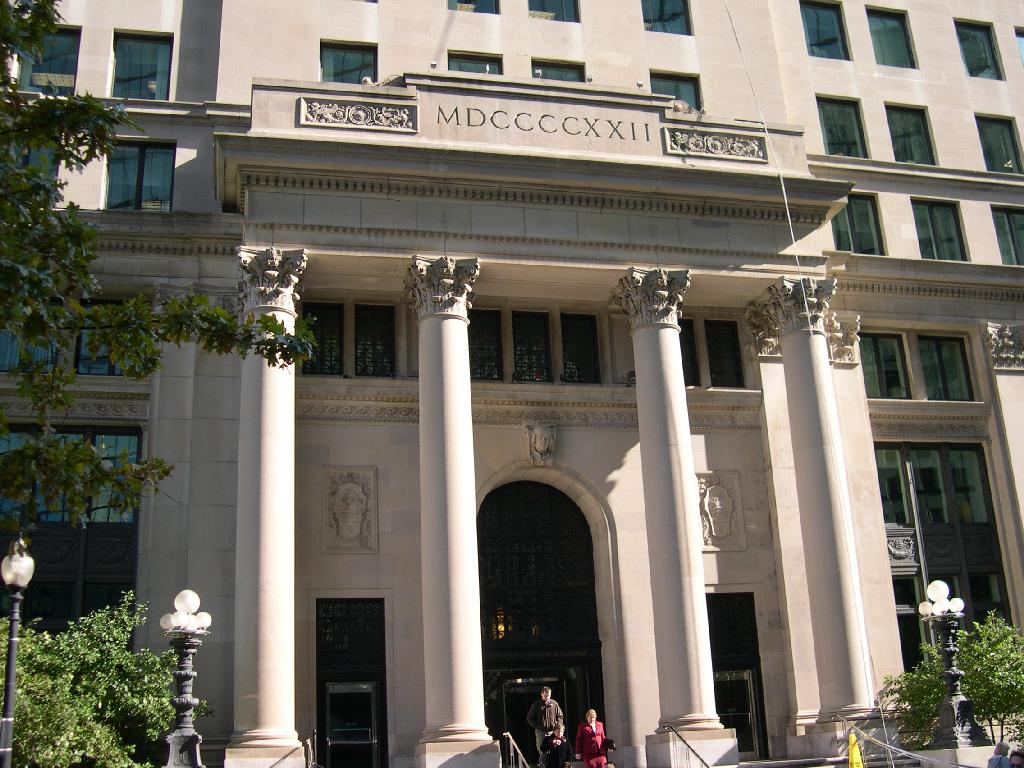
Facade of the Stephen L. Brown Building.

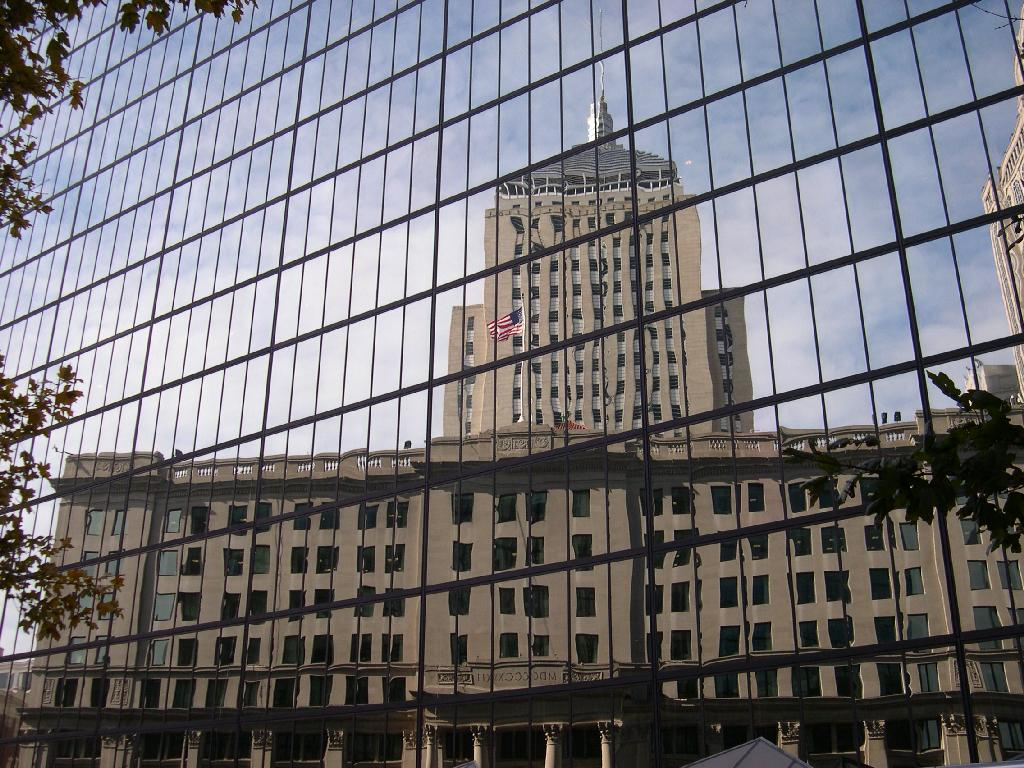
The three John Hancock buildings. The two older structures are reflected in the façade of the newest. The Stephen L. Brown building is the low, flat one.

The next John Hancock building was designed by Parker, Thomas and Rice, best known as architects of the United Shoe Machinery Corporation Building. It was completed in 1922. It is located at 197 Clarendon St. across from the Hancock tower. It was known as the "John Hancock Life Insurance Company Building." Parker, Thomas and Rice received the Harleston Parker Medal for its design in 1924. More recently, it was known as "The Clarendon Building", and circa 2001 it was renamed "The Stephen L. Brown Building" in honor of Stephen L. Brown, chairman of John Hancock Financial Services, Inc. According to Donlyn Lyndon, "if you stand on the corner of Clarendon Street and St. James Avenue and look directly into the mirrored surface of the third Hancock, you will see reflected there the first two, aligned hierarchically in an ethereal family portrait."

Originally, the Planned Development Area (PDA) agreement for the building of the 60-story John Hancock Tower called for 197 Clarendon to be demolished to make way for open space or a public square. In 1982, the Boston Redevelopment Authority, responding to a request from the John Hancock company, decided that it would be better to keep the building on the tax rolls. It was also thought that open space near the base of the tower might not be desirable, due to the tower's "wind tunnel" effect.

== 200 Berkeley Street, Old John Hancock (1947) ==
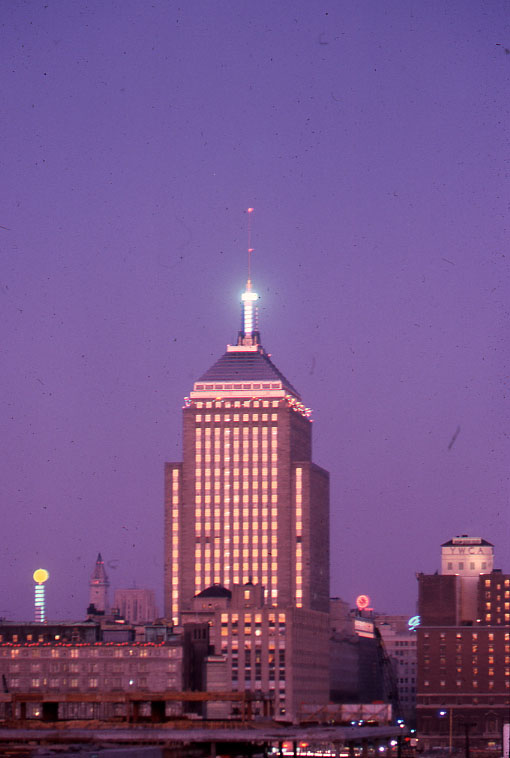
Berkeley Building with illuminated weather beacon on top

The Berkeley Building (also known as the Old John Hancock Building) is a 26-story, 495-foot (151 m) structure located at 200 Berkeley Street, the second of the three John Hancock buildings built in Boston. The building, located in Boston's Back Bay, was designed by Cram and Ferguson and completed in 1947. It is known for the weather beacon at its summit, which displays light patterns as weather forecasts.

== 200 Clarendon Street, John Hancock Tower (1976) ==
The John Hancock Tower, on the southeast corner of Copley Square, is a 60-story, 790 ft (240 m) skyscraper. It was designed by Henry N. Cobb of I. M. Pei & Partners and was completed in 1976. In 1977, the American Institute of Architects presented the firm with a National Honor Award for the building, and in 2011 conferred on it the Twenty-five Year Award. It has been the tallest building in Boston for more than 30 years and is the tallest building in New England.

== 601 Congress Street ==
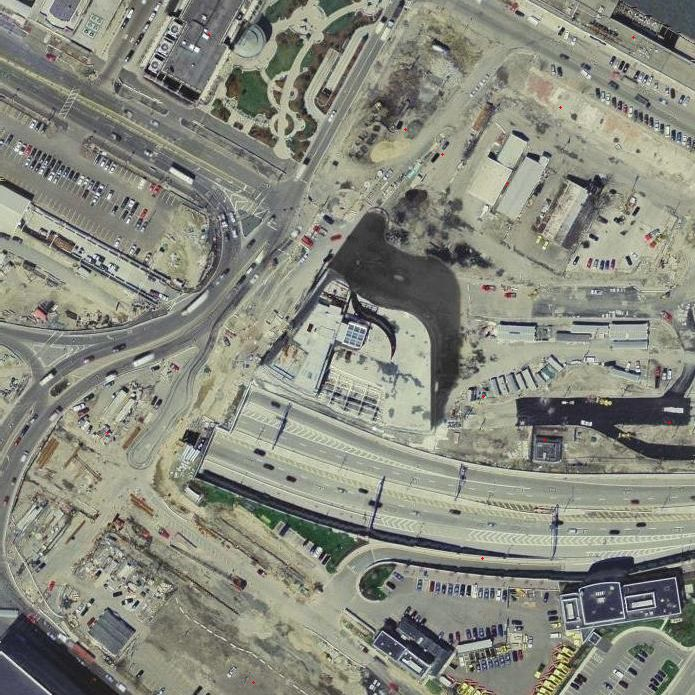
Construction site of Manulife building (601 Congress Street), taken 2003.

In 2002, Manulife Financial began construction of a 14-story building in the Seaport District at 601 Congress Street (Picture). The building was designed by Skidmore, Owings and Merrill LLP of Chicago, designers of the John Hancock Center in Chicago and the Sears Tower, also in Chicago. The building features a "green" (energy-efficient) dual glass curtain wall construction, making it among the first buildings in Boston to win national LEED (Leadership in Energy and Environmental Design) certification.

On April 28, 2004, the then-head of Manulife's Boston operations announced that the building would be renamed the "John Hancock Building." According to Manulife, this is not quite correct; the building, completed in fall of 2004, will house the John Hancock Wealth Management Group and will bear conspicuous "John Hancock" exterior and interior signage featuring the John Hancock logo. However, the company will refer to the building simply as "601 Congress."

As of 2018, Emporis lists the official name of the building as the "Manulife Tower".
