= Hansa Haus =

- U.S. Historic district – Contributing property
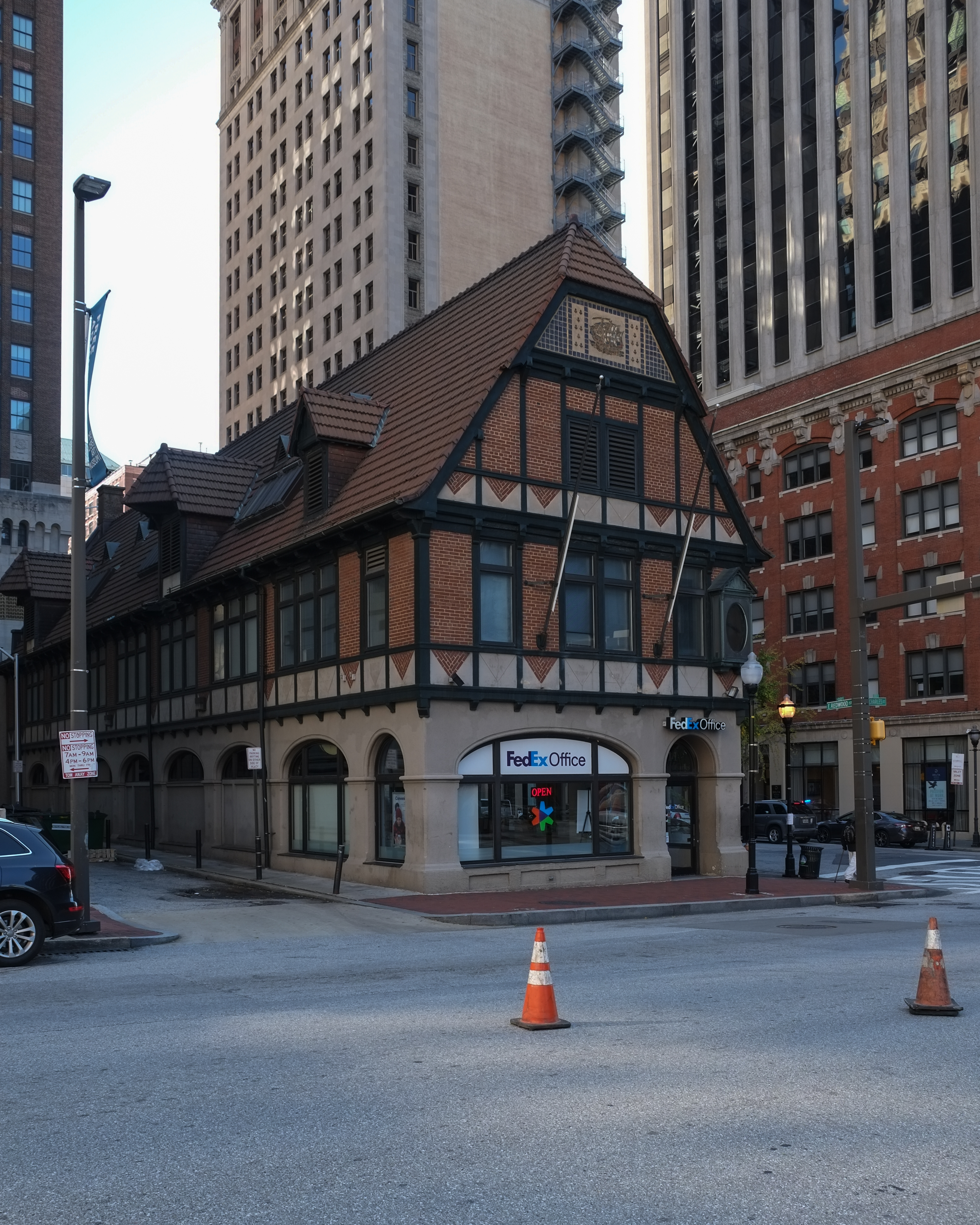

- Location within Maryland
- Location: Baltimore, Maryland
- Coordinates: 39.2889°N 76.6148°W
- Built: 1911
- Part of: Business and Government Historic District (ID87002065)

The Hansa Haus is a historic building in Downtown Baltimore, Maryland, United States. The structure is a Baltimore City Landmark, and a contributing property of the Business and Government Historic District, on the National Register of Historic Places.

== Attributes and history ==
The building was designed by the firm Parker, Thomas & Rice in 1911. It was built for the Savings Bank of Baltimore, especially for their tenant Albert Schumacher and Company, a German shipping agent. The building is designed to resemble a medieval courthouse standing in Halberstadt, Germany. It is named in honor of the Hanseatic League, a medieval confederation of German city-states.

The building has 2.5 stories, with an exterior of brick and stucco. The building's upper floors have a half-timber style. It is decorated with the coats of arms of cities that were part of the Hanseatic League, along with a carved panel of a ship in full sail, the logo of the league. Despite a large and prominent German population in Baltimore history, the Hansa Haus is the only early Germanic-style building in the city.

Second-floor tenants included the Imperial German Consulate and the Royal Swedish Vice-Consulate. The Swedish consulate moved out around the 1920s, though the German consulate remained in the building through the 1930s. After 1945, tenants changed frequently, with the same owner. In the early 1970s, the building's demolition was considered, as its small space limited its use. First Maryland Bank purchased the building and restored it, using the structure for the office of their president, and for their personnel department. There have been additional tenants since then, including the present printing and office service company.

The building was listed as contributing to the Business and Government Historic District, on the National Register of Historic Places, in 1987. In 2011, it was listed as an individual Baltimore City Landmark.
