= One Federal Street =

Office in Boston, Massachusetts, United States

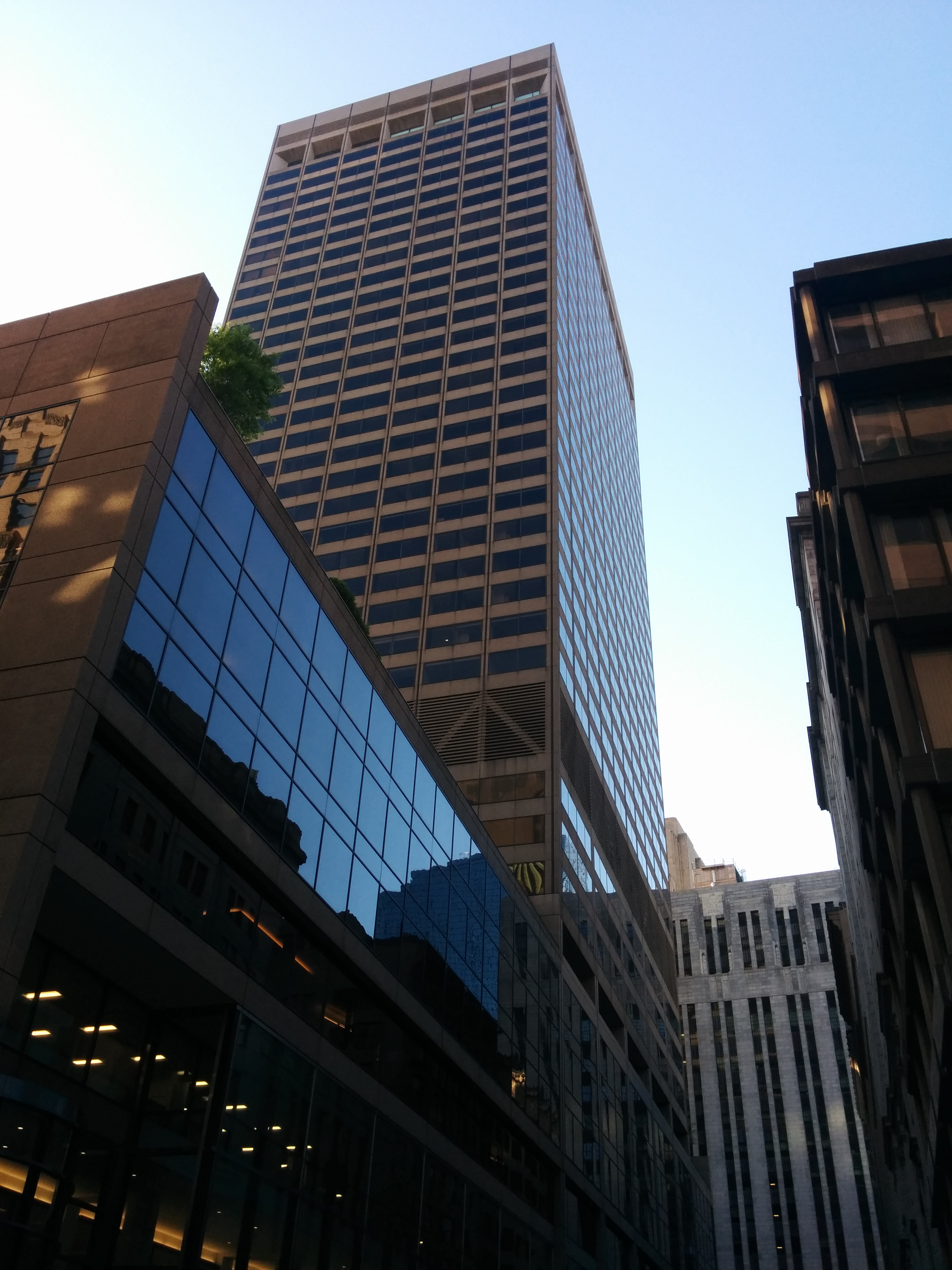
- One Federal Street, Boston

General information
- Type: Office
- Location: 1 Federal Street, Boston, Massachusetts
- Coordinates: 42.356564°N 71.056963°W
- Completed: 1975

Height
- Roof: 520 ft (160 m)

Technical details
- Floor count: 39
- Floor area: 1,199,993 sq ft (111,483.0 m^{2})

Design and construction
- Architect: The Architects Collaborative
- Developer: Jamestown US-Immobilien GmbH

One Federal Street is a skyscraper in the Financial District neighborhood of Boston, Massachusetts. Completed in 1975, it is Boston's 16th-tallest building, standing 520 feet (159 m) tall, and housing 38 floors. It is very close to the Rose F. Kennedy Greenway and to Faneuil Hall Marketplace. Construction of the building was completed in 1976. However, it underwent renovations between 1992 and 2011. Some of the most notable tenants include: AON Service Corporation, Morgan Lewis & Bockius LLP, Credit Suisse, J.P. Morgan, Oppenheimer, and U.S. Bank.

== Design and features ==
The building boasts an area spanning 1,118,355 square feet for rent as well as a two-story parking garage underneath.

Other features of the building include: covered parking, an on-site restaurant and coffee stand, banking facilities, and outstanding views of the surrounding area and Boston Harbor. As well, the building's penthouse is home to the Harvard Club. Further, it is very accessible to all the city's major highways and public transportation.

Once known as the Shawmut Bank Building, it was renamed when that bank was purchased. It is built on the site of the former First National Bank Building, the offices of which were moved to the modern First National Bank Building in 1971. Today, both One Federal Street and the FNB Building are occupied by Bank of America. This building is currently under study as a pending landmark by the Boston Landmarks Commission.

== Notable tenants ==
- AECOM
- Aon plc
- Arthur D. Little
- Bank of America
- Credit Suisse
- Greystar
- LevelUp
- Morgan, Lewis & Bockius
- Oppenheimer & Co
- US Bank
- Verrill Dana

== Gallery ==
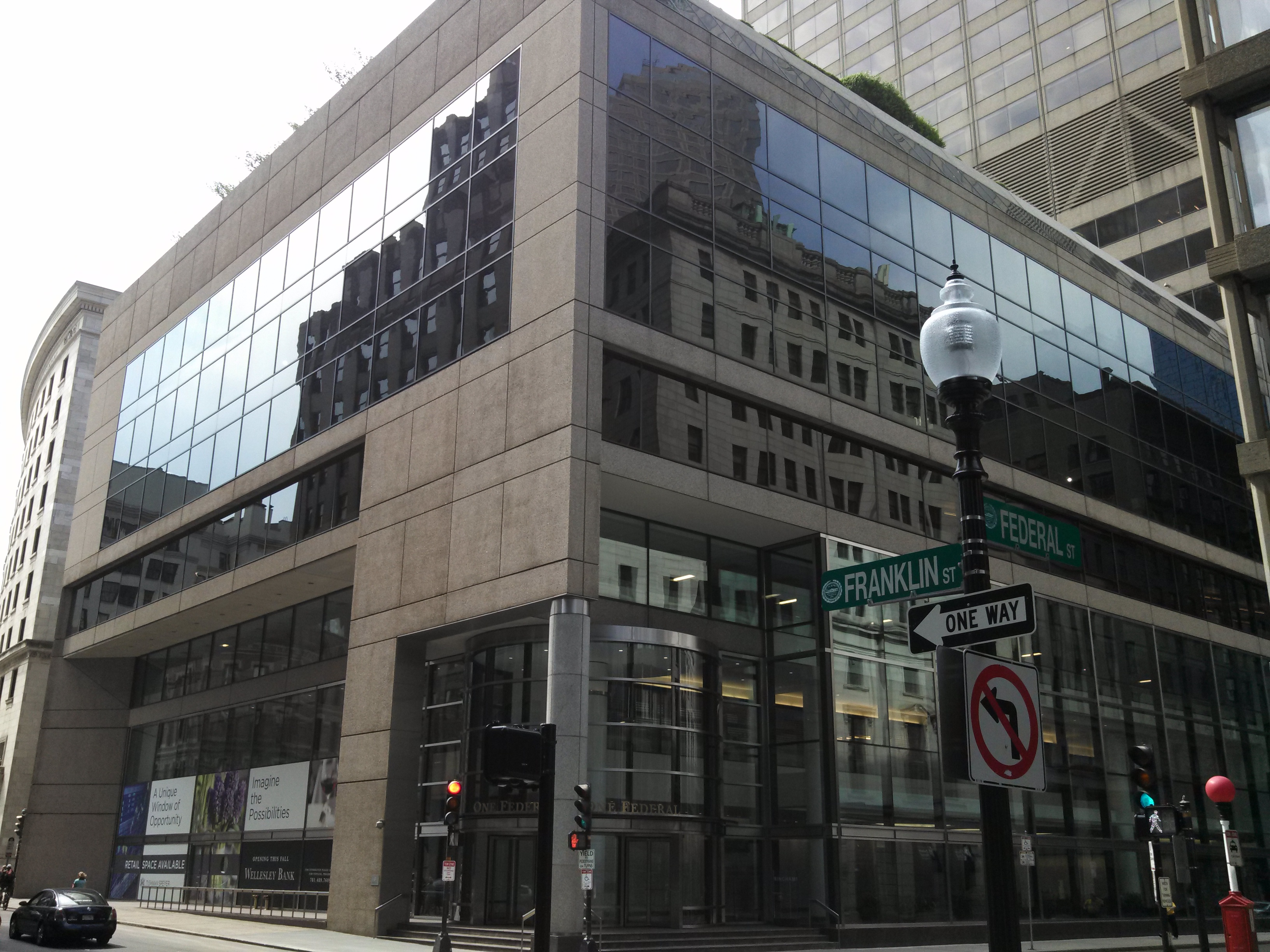
One Federal Street

== See also ==
- List of tallest buildings in Boston
