= 39 West Lexington =

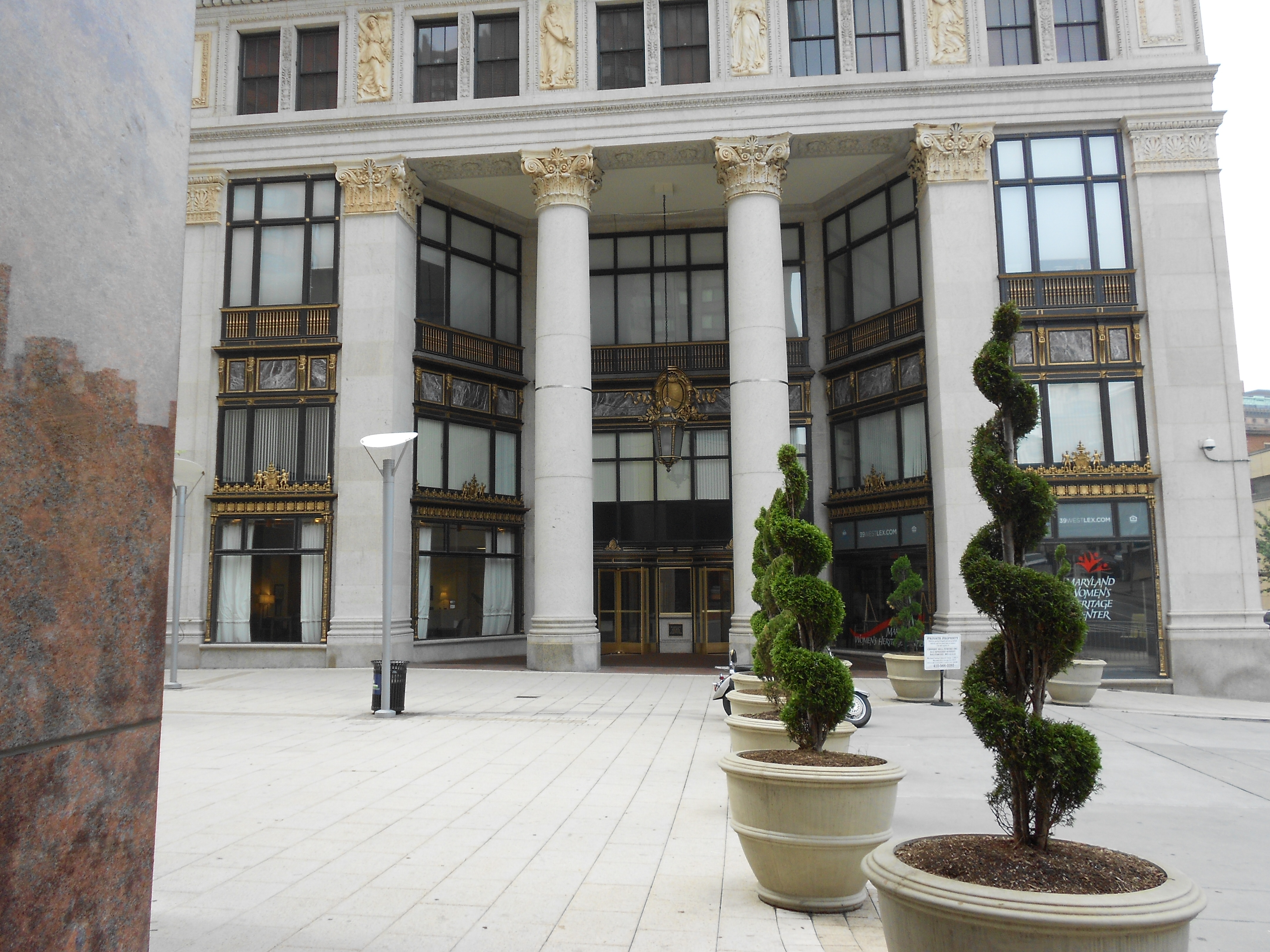
- Entrance to building at 39 West Lexington Street (southeast corner with North Liberty Street)
- Interactive map of the 39 West Lexington area
- Former names: Baltimore Gas & Electric Building; Consolidated Gas Company Building; Lexington Street Building; West Tower; Constellation Energy/BG&E Building

General information
- Type: Residential apartments
- Architectural style: Beaux-Arts architecture
- Location: 39 W. Lexington St. Baltimore, Maryland
- Coordinates: 39.2912°N 76.6171°W
- Completed: 1916

Height
- Roof: 88 m (289 ft)

Technical details
- Floor count: 21

Design and construction
- Architects: Parker, Thomas & Rice
- 39 West Lexington
- U.S. National Register of Historic Places
- Location within Baltimore Location within Maryland Location within the United States
- Built: 1916
- Architectural style: Beaux Arts, Skyscraper
- NRHP reference No.: 03001325
- Added to NRHP: December 29, 2003

39 West Lexington, previously the Baltimore Gas and Electric Company Building, is a historic office building located at Baltimore, Maryland, United States. It is the former headquarters of the old Consolidated Gas, Light and Electric Power Company of Baltimore City, which was a merger at the turn of the 20th century of the former century old Gas Light Company of Baltimore with several other formerly competing gas and electric power companies which had risen in the late 19th century, to form a single metropolitan wide unified utility system. In 1955, the old cumbersome Consolidated title was jettisoned and the utility rebranded as the Baltimore Gas and Electric Company (BG&E).

== History and construction ==
A 21-story skyscraper designed by the Boston and Baltimore-based architectural firm of Parker, Thomas and Rice, and was constructed in 1916. Standing at 88 m (289 ft) it was tied with the Emerson Bromo-Seltzer Tower from 1916 to 1923 as the tallest building in Baltimore. It was constructed with a structural steel skeleton and tile arch flooring structure. The exterior is clad with gray granite and gray and white marble from the first through third floors (including the mezzanine) and glazed terra cotta in a Beaux-Arts Classical Style. The building includes sculptures at the fourth floor representing "knowledge", "light", "heat" and "power."

Baltimore Gas and Electric Company Building was listed on the National Register of Historic Places in 2003.

A smaller addition was built in 1966, designed by Fisher, Nes, Campbell & Associates.

It was purchased in 2006 and reopened in 2007 as luxury apartments complete with two penthouse levels by Southern Management Companies.
