= Federal Street (Boston) =

Street in Boston, Massacushetts

Coordinates: 42°21′23.45″N 71°3′24.1″W

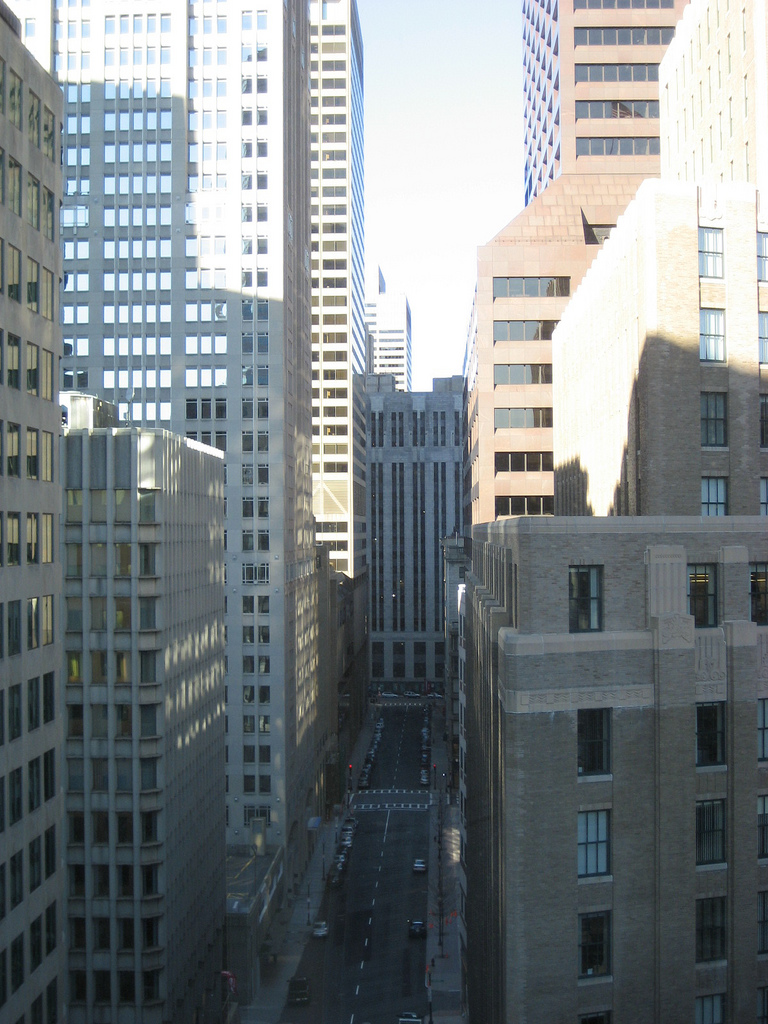
- Federal Street, Boston, 2008
- Interactive map of Federal Street
- South end: High Street
- Major junctions: Franklin Street
- North end: Milk Street

Federal Street is a street in the Financial District of Boston, Massachusetts. Prior to 1788, it was known as Long Lane. The street was renamed after state leaders met there in 1788 to determine Massachusetts' ratification of the United States Constitution.

== History ==
In 1727 the Long Lane Meeting House was established; it changed its name to the Federal Street Church in 1788. Henry Knox was born on Long Lane in 1750. The Federal Street Theatre was built in 1793, designed by Charles Bulfinch; it remained until 1852.

By 1806, residents included engraver Joseph Callender; printer Nathaniel Coverly; merchant Stephen Higginson; comedian Snelling Powell; dancing master William Turner. In 1823, residents included the Federal Street Coffee House; hairdresser William Lenox; Esther Newell and her "female intelligence office;" grocer Henry Sweetser; seamstress Martha Vincent. Dorothy Quincy and John Mackay also lived on Federal St. in the early 19th-century. Auctioneer J.L. Cunningham worked from Corinthian Hall, 1826-1843. J. H. Bufford's Sons ran a lithography printing business in the 1870s.

In 1928 arose Boston's "first art deco skyscraper," the United Shoe Machinery Building. In 1929, the "art deco jewel" at 75 Federal Street was built. The Blue Cross/Blue Shield building, designed by Paul Rudolph was built 1957-1960. 150 Federal Street, designed by Hugh Stubbins Jr. was built in 1988.

== Images ==
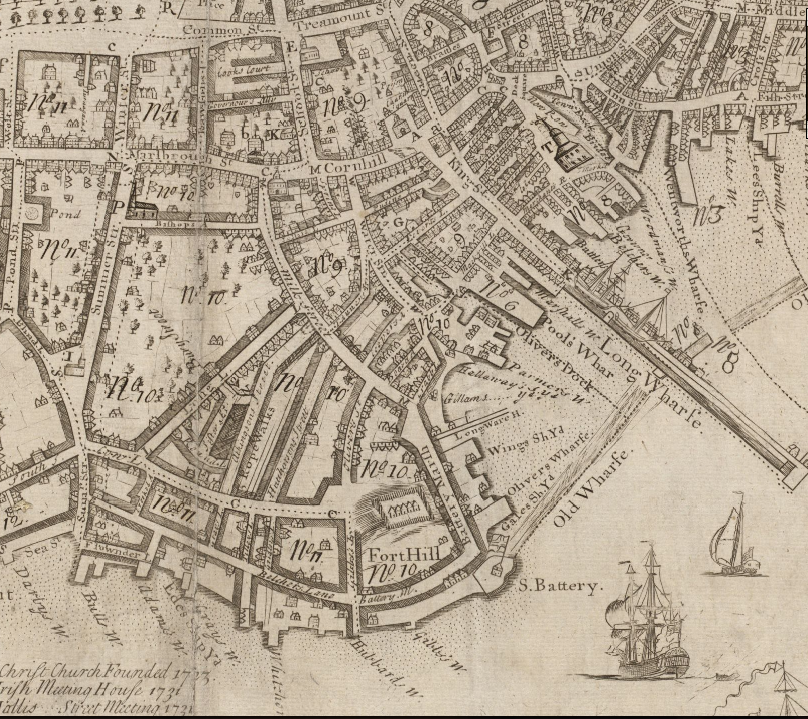
Detail of 1743 map of Boston, showing Long Lane and vicinity

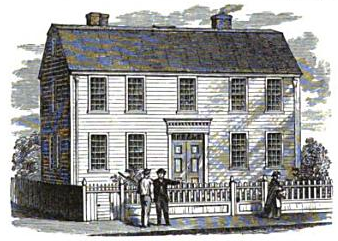
Birthplace of Henry Knox, 18th century

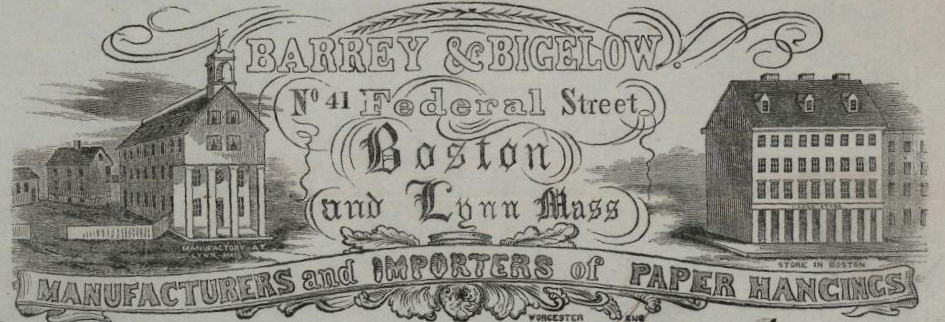
Barry & Bigelow, 41 Federal St., manufacturers and importers of paper hangings, c. 1840s

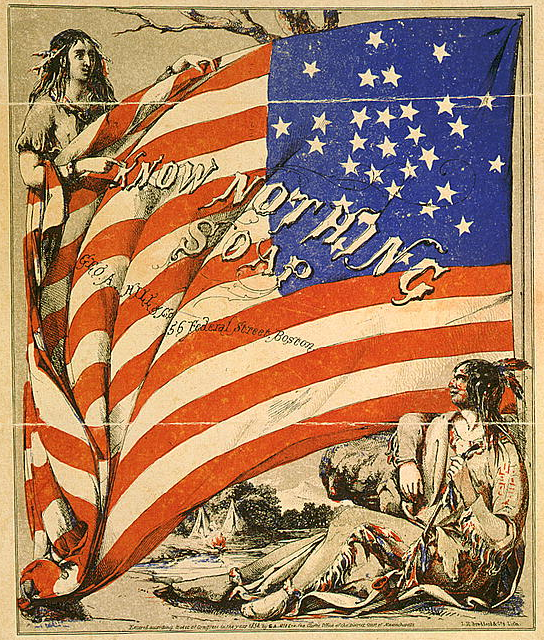
Label for "Know Nothing Soap", by George A. Hill & Co., 56 Federal St., 1854

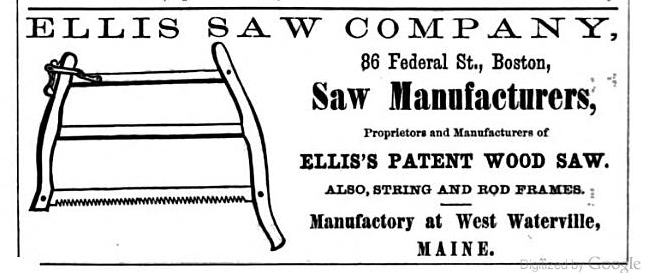
Ellis Saw Co., 1868

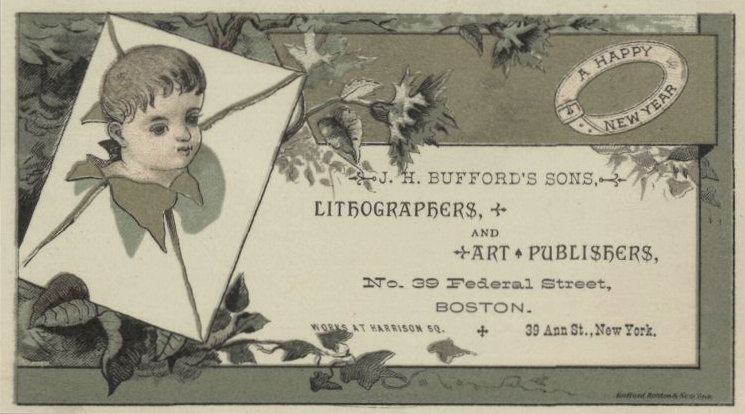
J.H. Bufford's Sons, lithographers, 1870

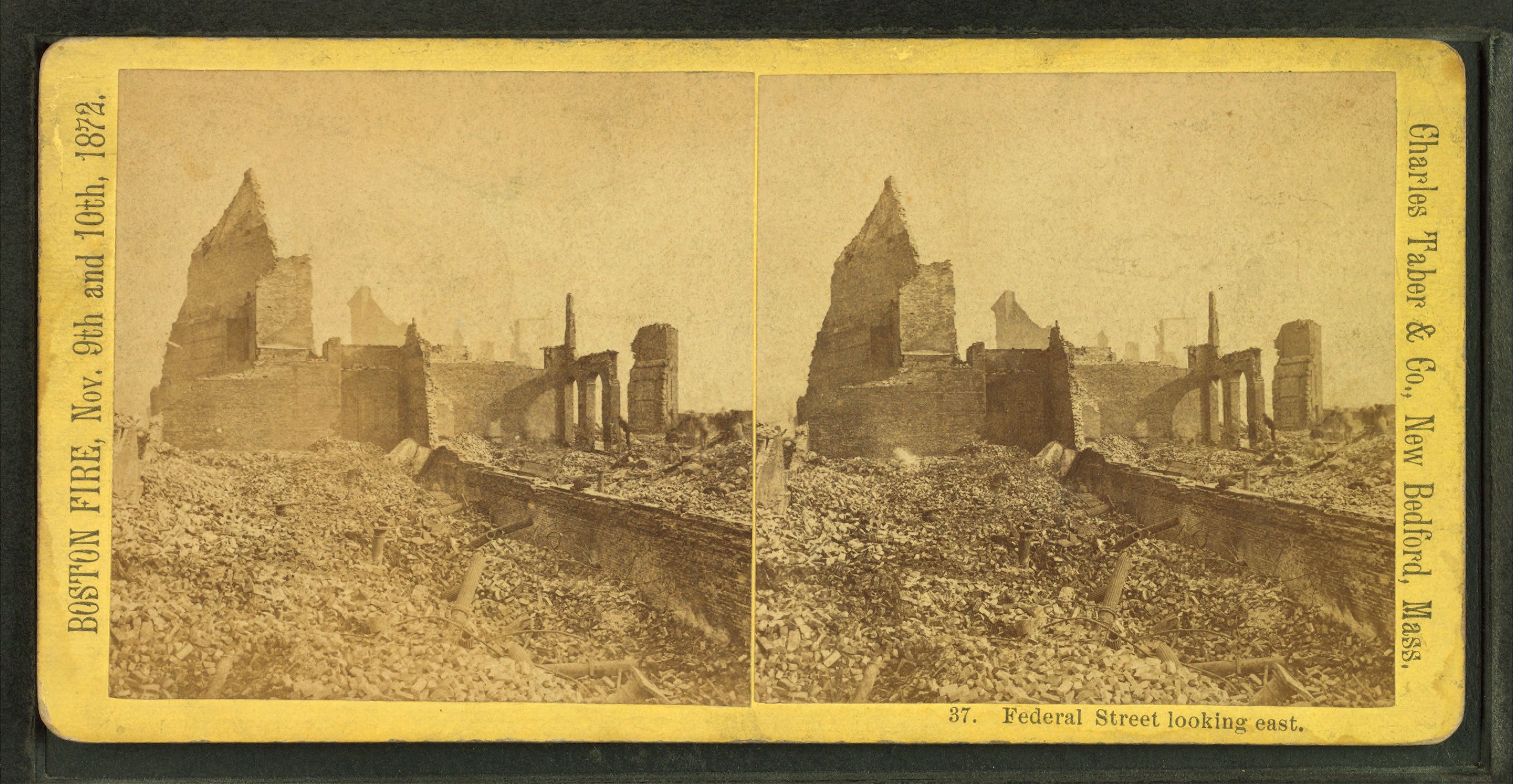
Federal Street after the Great Boston Fire of 1872

== See also ==
- 101 Federal Street
- Dewey Square
- Federal Street Church (Boston)
- Federal Street Theatre
- First National Bank Building (Boston, Massachusetts)
- Odeon, Boston
- One Federal Street
- Trans National Place
- United Shoe Machinery Corporation Building
