= Finney Houses Historic District =

Historic district in Maryland, United States

- U.S. National Register of Historic Places
- U.S. Historic district
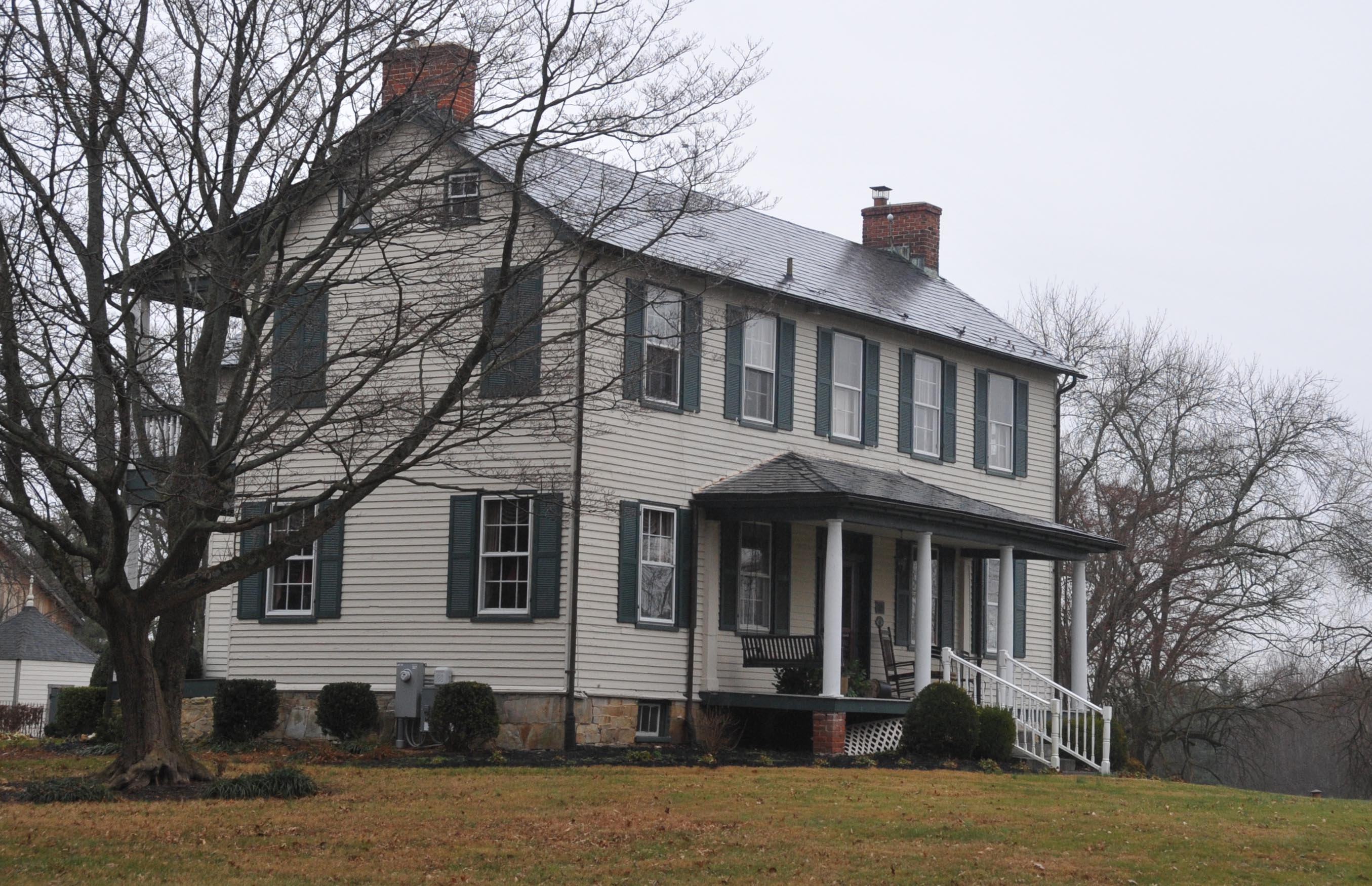
- Finney Houses Historic District in 2007

- Location within Maryland Location within the United States
- Location: Glenville Rd. near its junction with Maryland Route 155, Churchville, Maryland
- Coordinates: 39°34′20″N 76°14′20″W
- Area: 200 acres (81 ha)
- Built: 1921
- Architect: Parker & Thomas
- Architectural style: Colonial Revival, Gothic Revival, Federal
- NRHP reference No.: 89000502
- Added to NRHP: June 16, 1989

Finney Houses Historic District is a national historic district near Churchville, Harford County, Maryland, United States. It stretches along both sides of Glenville Road in central Harford County, Maryland. The district takes in four houses and their outbuildings erected by members of the locally important Finney family between 1821 and 1906.

It was added to the National Register of Historic Places in 1989.
