= United States Post Office and Court House (Huntington, West Virginia) =

- U.S. Post Office and Courthouse
- U.S. National Register of Historic Places
- U.S. Historic district – Contributing property
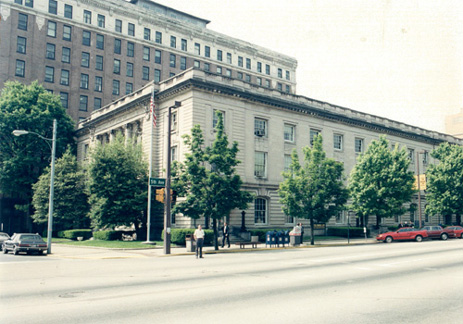

- Location within West Virginia Location within the United States
- Location: 845 5th Ave., Huntington, West Virginia
- Coordinates: 38°25′8″N 82°26′38″W
- Built: 1905
- Architect: Parker & Thomas
- Architectural style: Beaux Arts
- NRHP reference No.: 82004314
- Added to NRHP: April 15, 1982

The United States Post Office and Court House in Huntington, West Virginia is a federal building housing the United States District Court for the Southern District of West Virginia. It was built in 1907 and expanded in 1907, and again in 1937. The original construction was the result of the Tarsney Act of 1893. The federal courthouse is part of a group of significant civic structures in the center of Huntington that includes the Cabell County Courthouse, the Huntington City Hall and the Carnegie Public Library. The original design was by Parker and Thomas of Boston and Baltimore. The post office has since been moved to another location. In 1980, the United States Congress passed legislation renaming the building the Sidney L. Christie Federal Building, in honor of District Court judge Sidney Lee Christie.

== See also ==
- List of United States post offices
- National Register of Historic Places listings in Cabell County, West Virginia
