= United Shoe Machinery Corporation Building =

- U.S. National Register of Historic Places
- Boston Landmark
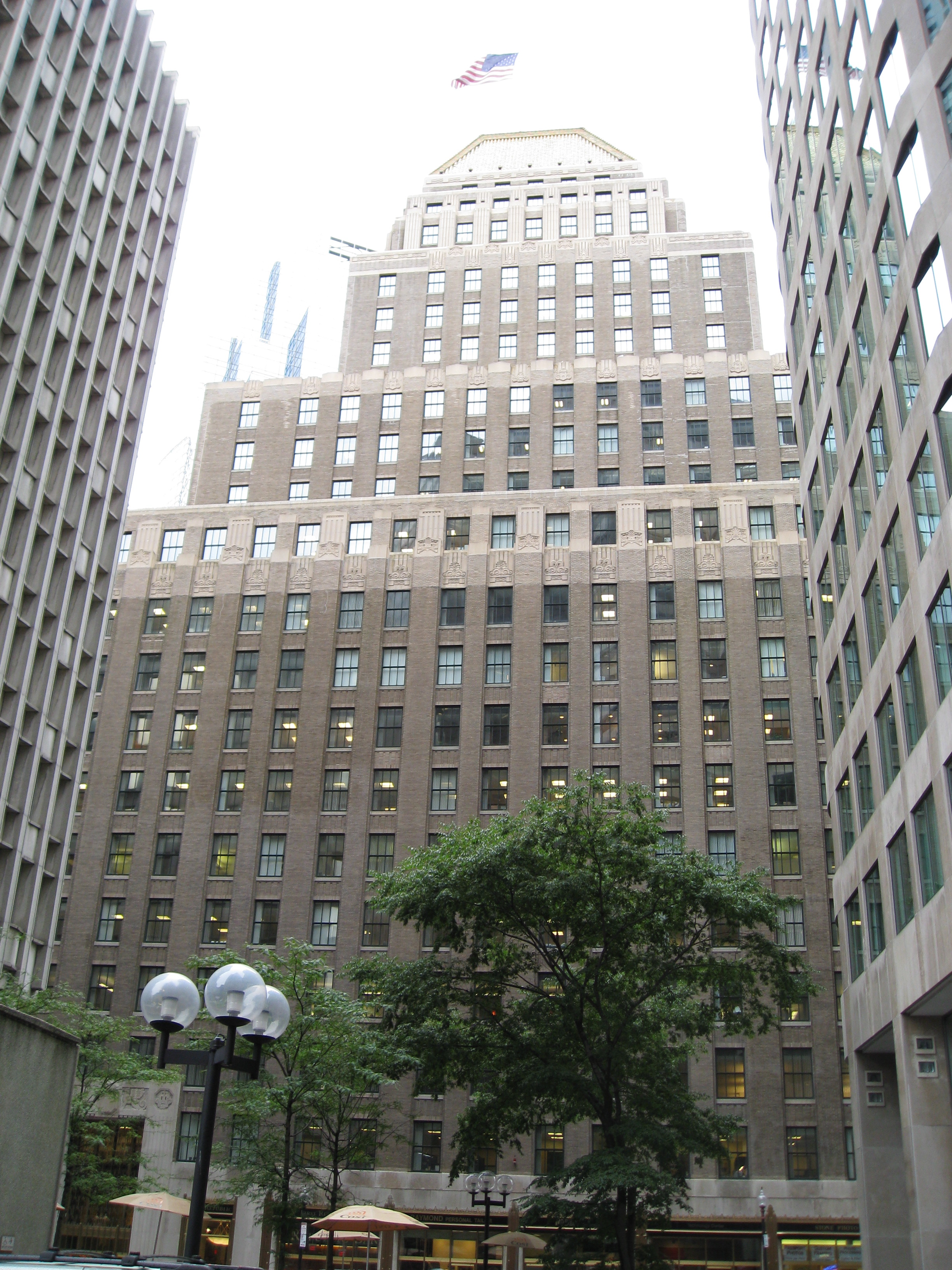

- Location within Boston Location within Massachusetts Location within the United States
- Location: 160 Federal Street; Boston, Massachusetts
- Coordinates: 42°21′14″N 71°3′23″W
- Built: 1929–1930
- Architect: George W.Fuller Co.; Parker, Thomas & Rice
- Architectural style: Art Deco
- NRHP reference No.: 80000668

Significant dates
- Added to NRHP: August 19, 1980
- Designated BOSL: December 20, 1983

The United Shoe Machinery Corporation Building is a historic office building at 160 Federal Street in the Financial District of Boston, Massachusetts. The steel-frame skyscraper has 24 stories and a penthouse, and was built in 1929–1930 to a design by George W. Fuller and Parker, Thomas & Rice for the United Shoe Machinery Corporation. It is one of Boston's finest Art Deco buildings, including an elaborately decorated lobby. It was built for the United Shoe Machinery Corporation, which at the time controlled 98% of the nation's shoe machinery business.

The building was listed on the National Register of Historic Places in 1980 and in 1983 it was designated a Boston Landmark with rare interior (lobby) as well as exterior protection by the Boston Landmarks Commission.

== See also ==
- National Register of Historic Places listings in northern Boston, Massachusetts
