= Arista AH =

- Type: Absorbable surgical hemostat agent
- Inventor: Medafor, Inc.
- Inception: October 2006
- Manufacturer: Becton Dickinson
- Website: Official website

Arista AH Absorbable Hemostat, referred to as Arista AH, is a plant-derived, absorbable topical hemostatic agent used during surgery as an adjunct to control capillary, venous, and arteriolar bleeding when pressure, ligation, and other conventional methods are ineffective or impractical.

It was developed by Medafor, Inc. and received U.S. Food and Drug Administration (FDA) premarket approval in 2006 before subsequent acquisitions by C. R. Bard, Inc., and Becton Dickinson. The agent is a white, dry, sterile powder of microporous polysaccharide hemospheres (MPH), particles made from purified potato starch.

When applied to a bleeding wound or surgical site, MPH acts as a dehydrator, rapidly absorbing the fluid components of blood, such as water and other low-molecular-weight substances, concentrating platelets and natural coagulation factors (blood solids) to accelerate the body's physiological clotting process.

The starch-based particles are broken down by the enzyme amylase and are typically absorbed within 24 to 48 hours. In the clinical trial supporting its FDA approval, Arista AH was non-inferior to an absorbable gelatin sponge, and no adverse events were deemed related to the device. Later studies comparing it with other hemostatic agents have reported mixed results.

== Developmental History ==
The technology behind Arista AH was developed by Medafor, Inc., a privately held company based in Minneapolis, Minnesota. In December 2001, the FDA cleared two Medafor wound dressings through the 510(k) process: Traumadex for prescription use and Bleed-X for over-the-counter use. Both contained Medafor’s Hemadex clotting beads, which are dry, sterile spherical particles made from purified plant-based polysaccharide. They were intended as topical dressings for bleeding wounds such as cuts, lacerations, and abrasions, and, under the care of a health care professional, for more severe surgical and traumatic wounds.

Medafor’s HemaDerm dressing, cleared in 2002, also contained Hemadex clotting beads. In HemaDerm’s 2003 clearance, Medafor described the same product as containing microporous polysaccharide hemospheres (MPH).

Medafor later introduced Arista AH, a flowable powder of microporous polysaccharide hemospheres (MPH) intended for use as an absorbable hemostat during surgery. Arista AH was first marketed in the European Union in August 2002, in Canada in October 2002, and in Australia in June 2004. The FDA granted it premarket approval (PMA) on September 26, 2006, as an adjunctive hemostatic device for most surgical procedures.

In August 2013, C. R. Bard, Inc. agreed to acquire Medafor for $200 million, plus up to $80 million in additional payments tied to revenue milestones, adding the Arista product line to the surgical specialties business of Bard’s Davol subsidiary. On December 29, 2017, Becton Dickinson completed its acquisition of Bard, which became a subsidiary of BD. Arista AH is now marketed by BD.

== Mechanism of Action ==
Arista AH consists of microporous polysaccharide hemospheres (MPH), which are water-insoluble, hydrophilic particles prepared from purified potato starch. The particles are made by reacting purified starch with epichlorohydrin.

Each particle has a controlled pore size that lets it act as a molecular sieve. On contact with blood, the particles draw in water and other low-molecular-weight substances by osmotic action, while blood cells and large proteins are excluded. This dehydrates the blood at the wound site's surface, concentrating platelets, red blood cells, and blood proteins such as albumin, thrombin, and fibrinogen. The concentration of these materials forms a thick, gel-like coagulum, with the particles acting as a scaffold on which a fibrin clot can form quickly. The effect is limited to the area where the powder is applied. MPH does not cause clotting on its own; it rather accelerates the body’s natural clotting process. It contains no thrombin or other biological components, thereby avoiding the risk of virus transmission associated with biologic hemostatic agents.

The manufacturer states that clotting begins on contact regardless of the patient’s coagulation status. Galarza and colleagues disputed this claim, arguing that it could not be specifically tested and that the powder’s effectiveness in patients with hypercoagulable conditions had not been examined. The manufacturer does not recommend Arista AH for the primary treatment of coagulation disorders.

Because Arista AH is a dry powder, it conforms to irregular wound surfaces and can be delivered into deep or hard-to-reach areas through a long, flexible applicator. Galarza and colleagues found it less precise to deliver than a gelatin-based hemostatic matrix because of its powder form. On contact with blood or other fluids, the particles swell to about five times their original volume. The powder must be applied dry, because contact with saline before hemostasis is achieved causes it to lose its hemostatic effect.

The particles are broken down by amylase enzymes and are typically absorbed within 24 to 48 hours.

== Clinical Efficiency ==
The effectiveness of Arista AH has been evaluated in pre-clinical studies and across several surgical disciplines, including cardiothoracic, orthopedic, and general surgery. In the various pre-clinical studies, which included testing on pig, mouse, and rabbit models with different modes of application, along with in vitro analysis on human blood, Arista AH accelerated clot formation, achieved hemostasis faster than the control treatments it was compared against, and was absorbed by the body within approximately 24 to 48 hours.

In a 2014 single-center retrospective study of 240 cardiothoracic surgery patients, 103 patients treated with Arista AH were compared with 137 who did not receive it. The use of Arista AH was associated with a significantly shorter time to localized hemostasis and reduced postoperative chest tube drainage in the first 48 hours. There was no significant difference in 30-day mortality or postoperative complications.

Arista AH is a flowable powder that can be applied throughout the surgical field. However, in a porcine liver abrasion model, it was less effective than a flowable thrombin-gelatin hemostatic matrix, which achieved better hemostasis and less blood loss at 5 and 10 minutes.

Results with MPH-based hemostats in other settings have been mixed. A 2004 randomized pilot study of 24 patients (48 wound stages) undergoing Mohs micrographic surgery compared an MPH-containing bandage with electrocautery. Wounds treated with the bandage bled through the dressing more often (9 of 22 vs. 1 of 26), but the rate of active bleeding when the dressing was removed did not differ significantly (2 of 22 vs. 5 of 26). The authors attributed several cases of bleeding through the dressing to the bandage being placed off-center, so that the powder did not cover the entire wound. They suggested that applying pressure for longer than one minute might improve results. The study was funded by the MPH manufacturer, Medafor.

== Safety and Contradictions ==
Arista AH is biocompatible, non-pyrogenic, and amylase enzymes typically absorb it within 24 to 48 hours. Starch contains amorphous regions, which amylases can break down easily, and crystalline regions, which are broken down more slowly. Unlike several other starch-based hemostats, Arista AH showed no starch crystallinity in preclinical testing, which the manufacturer attributes to a proprietary process that removes it.

Arista AH must not be injected or applied into blood vessels because of a potential risk of embolization and death. Current labeling excludes neurological and ophthalmic procedures, in which its safety and effectiveness have not been established. Because the particles swell on contact with fluid, excess powder should be removed once hemostasis is achieved, especially near the spinal cord, optic nerve, and confined spaces. It has not been clinically evaluated in children or pregnant women, may take longer than 48 hours to absorb in infants up to 10 months old because of reduced amylase activity, and should be limited to 50 grams in patients with diabetes.

In the clinical trial supporting its FDA approval, no adverse events were deemed related to Arista AH, although a rat study reported increased tissue death in skin flaps. A BD-sponsored review noted that oxidized regenerated cellulose, another plant-derived hemostat, can take weeks to be absorbed and has been linked to foreign body reactions and adhesions, whereas Arista AH was cleared more quickly in animal studies.
