= Tissuemed =

British medical device manufacturer

Tissuemed Ltd.
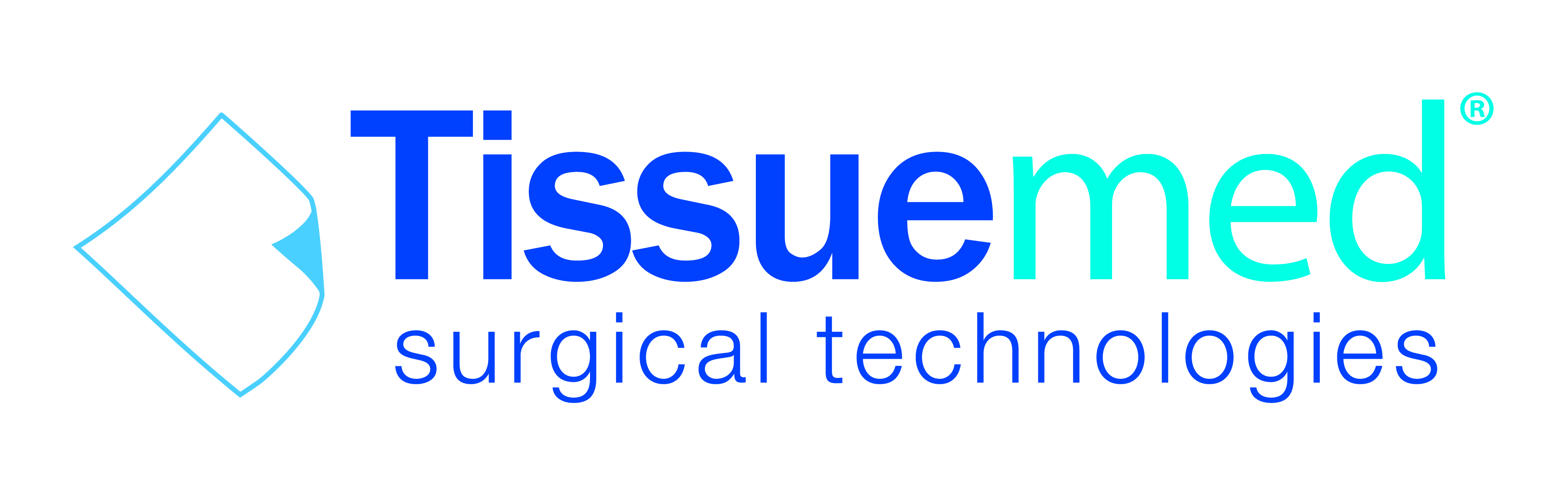
- Type: Private
- Industry: Medical Devices
- Headquarters: Leeds, West Yorkshire, U.K.
- Products: TissuePatch product family of surgical sealant films
- Website: www.tissuemed.com

Tissuemed is a medical device developer and manufacturer based in Leeds, UK.

The company was founded in 1985 and developed the first tissue heart valve (derived from pigs) to receive regulatory approval (CE mark) in Europe. This business was divested in 1999, and the heart values are currently sold by Vascutek, a Terumo company, under the Aspire brand. Thereafter, Tissuemed focused on the development of innovative tissue adhesives for internal surgical use, including a light activated tissue sealant to prevent blood loss during vascular anastomosis, the TissueBond system.

More recently in 2007, Tissuemed launched TissuePatch, a range of surgical sealant films for the prevention of leaks during surgery, including thoracic, general and neurosurgery.

These products incorporate a unique synthetic bioadhesive that forms a covalent bond with tissue proteins, enabling adhesion to internal organs and achieving a sealing effect. In June 2016, Tissuemed won approval from China's FDA for its TissuePatch surgical sealant.

The company was acquired by Becton Dickinson in 2021.
