= Maxwell Becton =

American industrialist (1868–1951)

- Born: Maxwell Wilber Becton; August 22, 1868; Kinston, North Carolina, US
- Died: January 2, 1951 (aged 82); Rutherford, New Jersey, US
- Education: Rutherford College
- Occupations: Industrialist and businessman
- Employer: Becton, Dickinson and Company
- Known for: Co-founder of Fairleigh Dickinson College

Maxwell Wilber Becton (August 22, 1868 – January 2, 1951) was an American industrialist and businessman. He co-founded Becton, Dickinson and Company in 1897 with Fairleigh S. Dickinson. He also co-founded Fairleigh Dickinson College.

== Early life ==
Becton was born on his family's plantation in Kinston, North Carolina on August 22, 1868. His parents were Eliza and Jarman Becton. Growing up, he attended the Woodington Methodist Church. He attended local schools. He attended Rutherford College. However, the college burned in 1888, so he only completed two years of college. He then moved to New York.

== Career ==
In New York in 1888, Becton worked as a salesman. In 1891, he moved to Montana where he worked in real estate. He moved to Boston in 1895 and co-founded Randall and Becton, a medical thermometer company. While in Texas on a sales trip, he met Fairleigh S. Dickinson (1866–1948), co-founder of Becton Dickinson and the named benefactor of Fairleigh Dickinson University who was a paper salesman. The two men discovered that they grew up fifty miles apart in North Carolina and had the same birthday. They quickly became close friends.

After buying out Randall, Becton and Dickinson created a partnership to sell medical thermometers and syringes, in 1897. Later, the company also produced hypodermic needles and syringes to inject insulin. The company incorporated as Becton, Dickinson & Company in 1906 and built a manufacturing plant in East Rutherford, New Jersey. Becton served as the company's secretary and treasurer, and later served as the chairman of the board.

Becton, Dickinson & Company supplied medical instruments to the United States Army during the Spanish–American War, World War I, and World War II. As the company expanded, it grew to become a manufacturer of instruments for surgery, dentistry, and veterinary. They also made medical bags and invented new instruments, including the binaural stethoscope and the mercurial sphygmomanometer that measured blood pressure. They also developed an all cotton elastic bandage, named the ACE bandage in 1918. In 1948, the founder's sons took over management of the company.

In the 1920s, Becton and Fairleigh purchased the South Bergen Savings and Loan Association together, with Becton serving as its president. The bank was later known as the National Community Bank of New Jersey. He was also vice president and a director of the Rutherford National Bank. He was president of the Bergen County Chamber of Commerce.

== Personal life ==
Becton married Valarie Prentiss of Rutherford, New Jersey, in 1913. They had three children, Henry Becton, Suzanne Becton, and Valerie Becton. The family built a home in Rutherford, across the street from Dickinson's house.

Becton was a major donor to Fairleigh Dickinson College when it was established in 1941, allowing the construction of Becton Hall. He served on the college's board of trustees. On the campus, Becton Hall and the Maxwell Becton School of Arts and Science were named in his honor. He was a trustee of Hackensack Hospital. He donated in his mother's memory to build a new building for the Woodington Methodist Church in Woodington, North Carolina. Later, he donated a Hammond electric organ to the church.

He was a member of the Freemans, belonging to the Boiling Springs Lodge, the Knights Templar, and the Lafayette Commandery. He was president of the Rutherford Rotary Club, a director of the YMCA, and a member the New York Southern Society. He also belonged to the New Jersey Senior Golf Association.

Becton had a stroke in 1943 and cut back on working. He died in his home in Rutherford, New Jersey on January 2, 1951, at the age of 83 years. He was buried in the Hillside Cemetery in Lyndhurst, New Jersey.
