= Hillside Cemetery (Lyndhurst, New Jersey) =

Coordinates: 40°48′40″N 74°06′31″W

Hillside Cemetery is a non-profit, non-sectarian cemetery in Lyndhurst, New Jersey. It was established in 1882.

== Notable burials ==
- Maxwell Becton (1868–1951), co-founder of Becton-Dickinson
- Fairleigh S. Dickinson (1866–1948), co-founder of Becton-Dickinson and benefactor of Fairleigh Dickinson University
- Joey Ramone (1951–2001), member of the Ramones
- Alexander Russell Webb (1846–1916), writer, publisher, early American convert to Islam and the United States Ambassador to the Philippines
- William Carlos Williams (1883–1963), poet

== See also ==
- Bergen County cemeteries
