= Frederic Foley =

American urologist (1891–1966)

Frederic Eugene Basil Foley, MD, (April 5, 1891 – March 24, 1966) was an American urologist who designed the Foley catheter.

== Biography ==
Frederic Foley was born in St. Cloud, Minnesota in 1891. He studied languages at Yale University, receiving a bachelor's degree in 1914, and then trained in medicine at the Johns Hopkins School of Medicine until his graduation in 1918. He subsequently worked with William Halsted and Harvey Cushing, and worked at the Peter Bent Brigham Hospital, Boston on the junior surgical staff.

Although there is no record of his training in urology, he was certified by the American Board of Urology in 1937. Foley worked as a urologist in Boston, Massachusetts and later became chief of urology at Ancker Hospital in St. Paul, Minnesota. (Ancker Hospital was renamed St. Paul Ramsey Medical Center and is now known as Regions Hospital.) He died in 1966 of lung cancer.

== Foley catheter ==
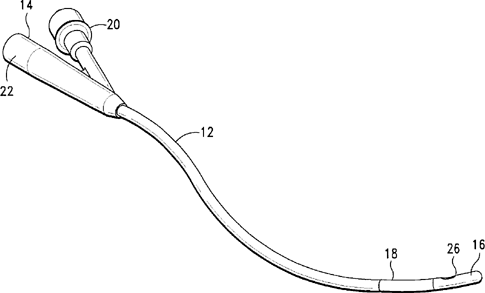
Diagram of a Foley catheter

Foley first described the use of a self-retaining balloon catheter in 1929, to be used to achieve hemostasis after cystoscopic prostatectomy. He worked on development of this design for use as an indwelling urinary catheter, to provide continuous drainage of the bladder, in the 1930s. His design incorporated an inflatable balloon towards the tip of the tube which could be inflated inside the bladder to retain the catheter without external taping or strapping. He demonstrated this to the American Urologists Society in 1935, and published a paper describing it in 1937.

While he was still developing his catheter, a patent was issued to Paul Raiche of the Davol Rubber Company of Providence, Rhode Island in 1936. Four months later, in October 1936, Foley applied for the patent, and was awarded this after appearing before the patent office Board of Appeals. Raiche appealed this decision in court, and it was overturned, returning the patent to Raiche. A further request for a hearing made by Foley was refused, and so the patent stayed with Raiche.

== Legacy ==
The C. R. Bard Company of New Jersey started distributing the catheters, under the name of Foley catheters, from 1935; consequently, the name has remained with Foley despite the patent having remained with the Davol Company. Although the materials used to make catheters have changed, the basic design of the 1930s has not.

In addition to his work on urinary catheters, Foley also described a novel technique for treating strictures of the pelvi-ureteric junction which is known as the Foley Operation or the Foley Y-plasty pyeloplasty. He also invented a hydraulic operating table and a rotatable resectoscope, and described the first artificial urethral sphincter.

== Sources ==
- Genealogy
