= Harleston Parker Medal =

American architectural prize

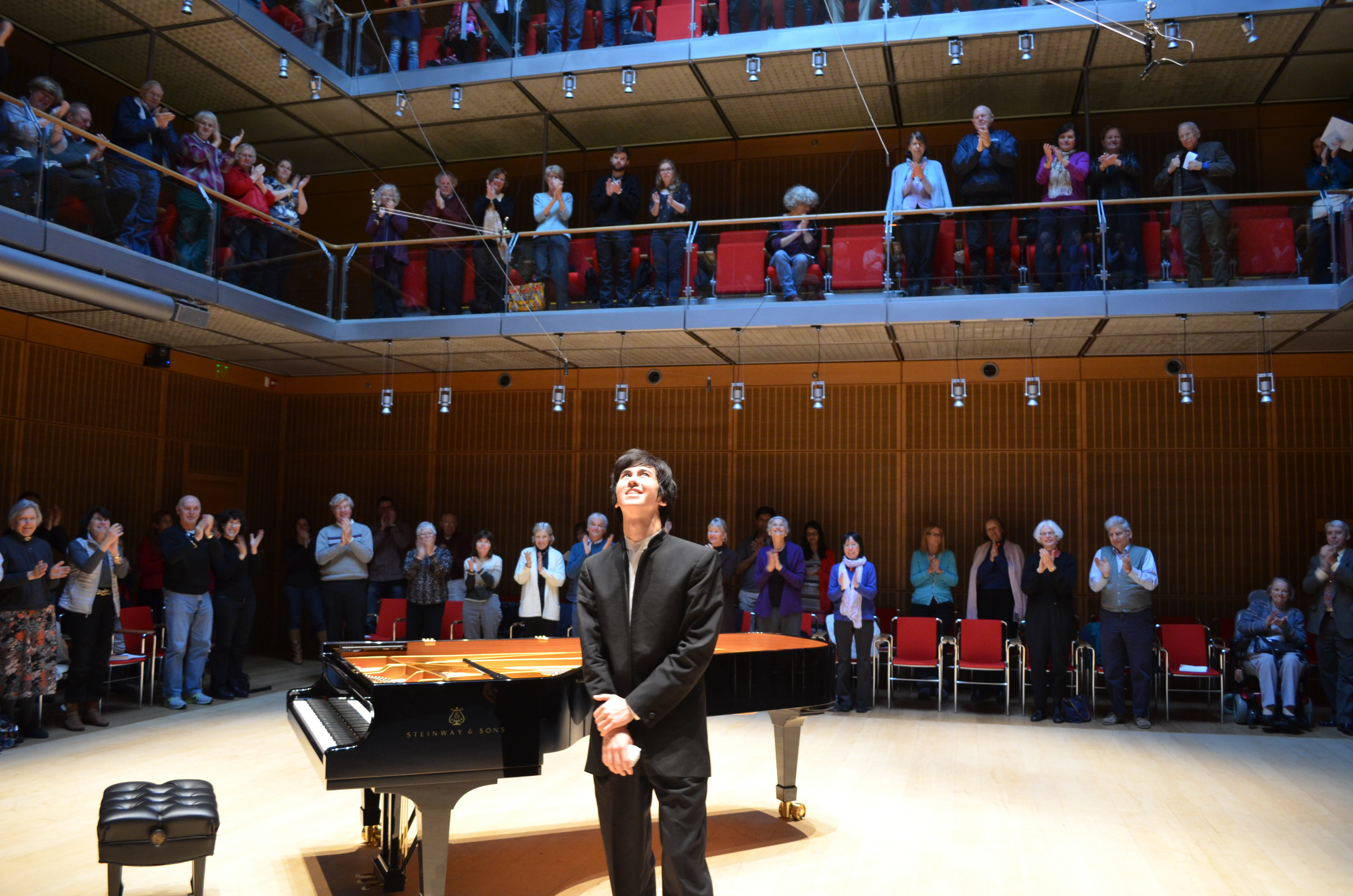
Inside the Isabella Stewart Gardner Museum Addition, winner of the 2015 Harleston Parker Medal. Designed by Renzo Piano Building Workshop with Stantec

The Harleston Parker Medal was established in 1921 by J. Harleston Parker to recognize “such architects as shall have, in the opinion of the Boston Society of Architects for any private citizen, association, corporation, or public authority, the most beautiful piece of architecture, building, monument or structure within the limits of the City of Boston or of the Metropolitan Parks District”.

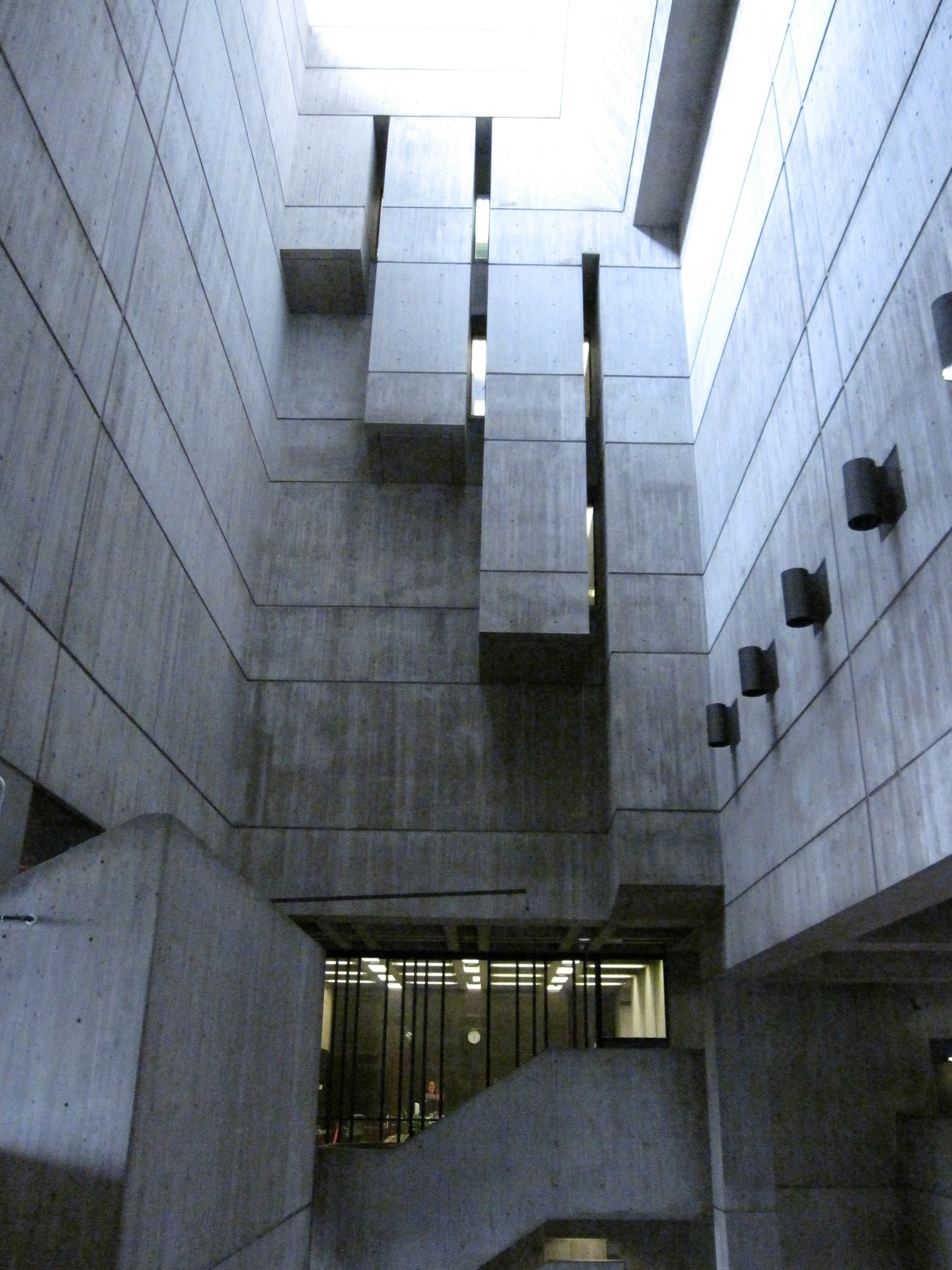
Interior of Boston City Hall, 1969 recipient of the Harleston Parker Medal. Designed by Kallmann McKinnell and Knowles in association with Campbell, Aldrich & Nulty and LeMessurier Associates

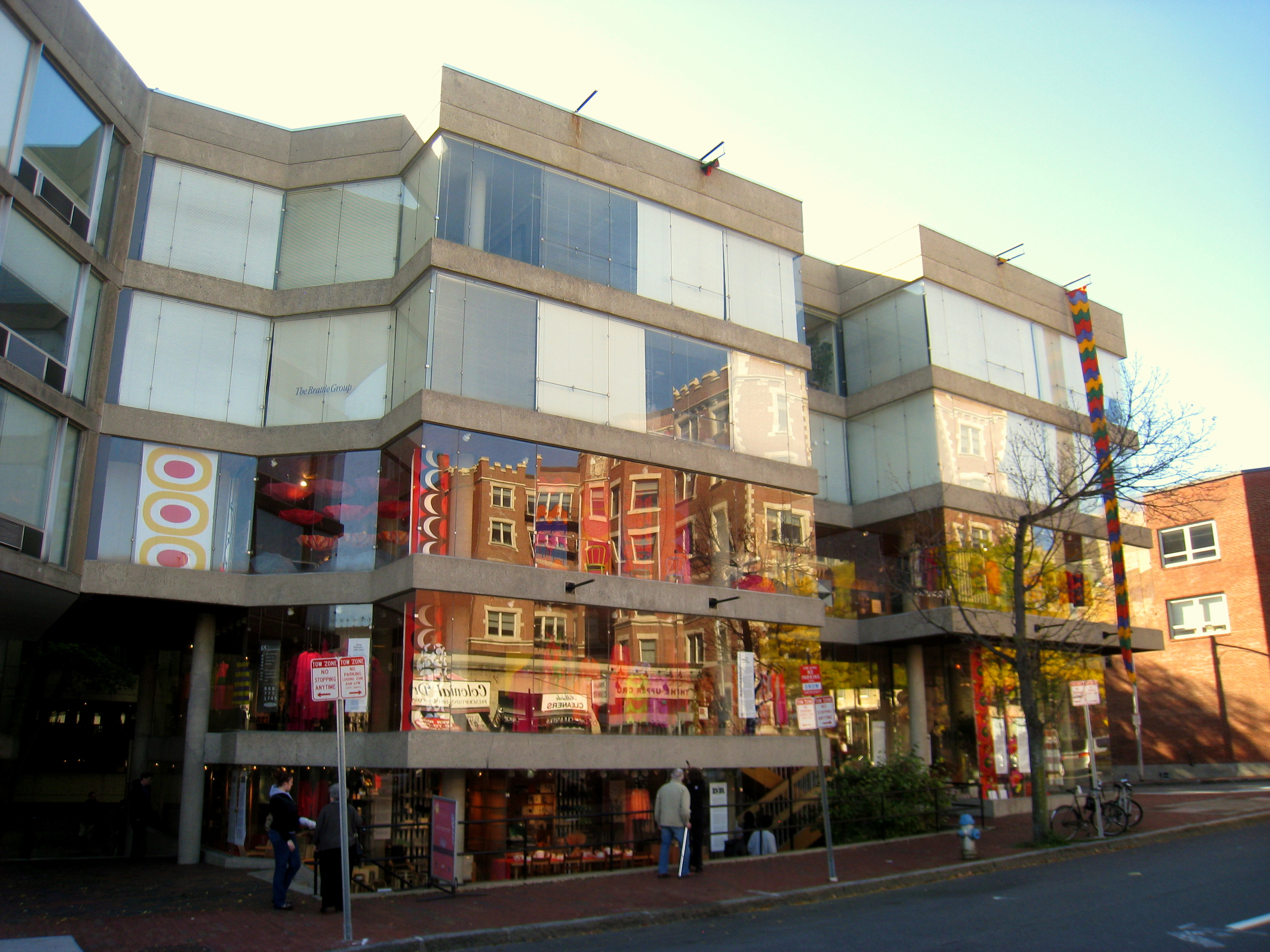
Design Research International, 1970 Harleston Parker Medal recipient, designed by Benjamin Thompson and Associates

Projects in the Greater Boston area built in the past 10 years by any architect anywhere in the world are eligible. This area includes Arlington, Belmont, Boston, Braintree, Brookline, Cambridge, Canton, Chelsea, Dedham, Dover, Everett, Hingham, Hull, Lynn, Malden, Medford, Melrose, Milton, Nahant, Needham, Newton, Quincy, Revere, Saugus, Somerville, Stoneham, Swampscott, Wakefield, Waltham, Watertown, Wellesley, Weston, Weymouth, Winchester, Winthrop and Woburn.

== List of medal recipients ==
Year	Architect	Building	Location
1923	Coolidge and Shattuck	Boston Lying-in Hospital	Boston
1924	Parker, Thomas and Rice	John Hancock Building	Boston
1925	No award		
1926	Maginnis & Walsh	Science Building, Boston College	Boston
1927	Ralph Harrington Doane	Motor Mart Garage	Boston
1928	No award		
1929	No award		
1930	Richard J. Shaw	Immaculate Conception Convent	Malden
1931	No award		
1932	No award		
1933	No award		
1934	Perry, Shaw & Hepburn	Alice Longfellow Hall, Radcliffe	Cambridge
1935	No award		
1936	Allen, Collens & Willis	Newton City Hall	Newton
1937	No award		
1938	Coolidge Shepley Bulfinch and Abbott	Lowell House, Harvard	Cambridge
1939	Cram & Ferguson	Conventual Church of St. Mary and St. John	Cambridge
1940	No award		
1941	Richard J. Shaw	Edward Hatch Memorial Music Shell	Boston
1942	No award		
1943	Perry, Shaw & Hepburn	Houghton Library, Harvard University	Cambridge
1944	No award		
1945	No award		
1946	Richard J. Shaw	St. Clement's Church	West Somerville
1947	No award		
1948	No award		
1949	Richmond & Goldberg	Southern Brookline Community Center, Temple Emeth	Brookline
1950	Cram & Ferguson	John Hancock Mutual Life Insurance Co., Berkeley St.	Boston
1951	Brown, DeMars, Kennedy, Koch & Rapson	100 Memorial Drive apartment building	Cambridge
1952	Arland A. Dirlam	University Lutheran Church	Cambridge
1953	Shepley Bulfinch Richardson and Abbott	Allston Burr Lecture Hall, Harvard	Cambridge
1954	Maginnis & Walsh & Kennedy	Nazareth Child Care Center	Boston
1955	Hugh Stubbins & Associates	Country School	Weston
1956	Richard J. Shaw	Corpus Christi Church	Auburndale
1957	Anderson Beckwith & Haible	Boston Manufacturers Mutual and Mutual Boiler Machinery Co. Office Building	Waltham
1958	Skidmore, Owings & Merrill	Karl Taylor Compton Laboratories, MIT	Cambridge
1959	José Luis Sert	Sert Residence at 64 Francis Street	Cambridge
1960	Shepley Bulfinch Richardson and Abbott	Quincy House, Harvard	Cambridge
1961	The Architects Collaborative	Academic Quadrangle, Brandeis	Waltham
1962	No award		
1963	No award		
1964	Le Corbusier (Charles-Edouard Jeanneret) in association with Sert, Jackson & Gourley	Carpenter Visual Arts Center, Harvard	Cambridge
1965	I.M. Pei & Associates	The Earth Sciences Building (The Green Center for Earth Sciences), MIT	Cambridge
1966	Sert, Jackson & Gourley	Peabody Terrace, Harvard	Cambridge
1967	Sert Jackson and Associates	Holyoke Center, Harvard	Cambridge
1968	No award		
1969	Kallmann McKinnell and Knowles in association with Campbell, Aldrich & Nulty and LeMessurier Associates	Boston City Hall	Boston
1970	Benjamin Thompson and Associates	Design Research International	Cambridge
1971	Edward Larrabee Barnes FAIA and Emery Roth and Sons, Associated Architects	New England Merchants National Bank Building	Boston
1972	The Architects Collaborative	Children's Hospital Medical Center	Boston
1973	Benjamin Thompson and Associates	Monroe C. Gutman Library, Graduate School of Education, Harvard	Cambridge
1974	Kallmann and McKinnell	Boston Five Cents Savings Bank	Boston
1975	I.M. Pei & Partners, in association with Araldo Cossutta, Architect	Christian Science Center, Boston	Boston
1976	Sert Jackson and Associates	Harvard University Science Center	Cambridge
1977	Benjamin Thompson and Associates	Quincy Market Building, Faneuil Hall Marketplace	Boston
1978	The Architects Collaborative	Josiah Quincy Community School	Boston
1979	Charles G. Hilgenhurst Associates	East Cambridge Savings Bank	Cambridge
1980	I.M. Pei & Partners	Dreyfus Laboratory, MIT	Cambridge
1981	The Stubbins Associates	Federal Reserve Bank of Boston	Boston
1982	Kallmann McKinnell & Wood	American Academy of Arts and Sciences	Cambridge
1983	I.M. Pei & Partners	John Hancock Tower	Boston
1984	No award		
1985	Graham Gund Architects	Church Court Condominiums	Boston
1986	No award		
1987	Perry Dean Rogers & Partners	Wellesley College Science Center	Wellesley
1988	Koetter, Kim & Associates	Codex World Headquarters	Canton
1989	Kallmann McKinnell & Wood	Hynes Convention Center	Boston
1990	Kallmann McKinnell & Wood	Shad Hall, Harvard Business School	Allston
1991	Frank O. Gehry & Associates with Schwartz/Silver Architects	360 Newbury Street	Boston
1992	SOM, Parsons Brinkerhoff Quade & Douglas, The Halvorson Company, Ellenzweig Associates, and LeMessurier Consultants	The Park and Garage at Post Office Square	Boston
1993	Schwartz/Silver Architects	Rotch Library, MIT	Cambridge
1994	Kallmann McKinnell & Wood	Hauser Hall, Harvard Law School	Cambridge
1995	No award		
1996	Leers Weinzapfel Associates in association with Chisholm Washington Architects	George Robert White Youth Development Center	Boston
1997	Stanley Saitowitz	New England Holocaust Memorial	Boston
1998	No award		
1999	Shared Award: Graham Gund Architects; TAMS/Gannet Fleming/URS/Wallace Floyd Design Group/Stull and Lee	The Lincoln School, Brookline; Vent Building #7 at Logan Airport	Brookline; Boston
2000	Jose Rafael Moneo, Arquitecto and Payette Associates	Davis Art Museum and Cultural Center, Wellesley College	Wellesley
2001	Shepley Bulfinch Richardson and Abbott	Boston Public Library renovation of the original McKim Mead & White building	Boston
2002	Office dA in association with SmartArchitecture	Northeastern University Multi-Faith Spiritual Center	Boston
2003	Machado and Silvetti Associates	Boston Public Library, Honan-Allston Branch	Allston
2004	Steven Holl Architects with Perry Dean Rogers Partners	Simmons Hall, MIT	Cambridge
2005	William Rawn Associates	Northeastern University's College of Computer and Information Science & Residence	Boston
2006	Mack Scogin Merrill Elam Architects	Wang Campus Center, Wellesley College	Wellesley
2007	Diller Scofidio + Renfro and Perry Dean Rogers Partners	Institute of Contemporary Art, Boston	Boston
2008	Behnisch, Behnisch + Partner with Next Phase Studio	Genzyme Center	Cambridge
2009	Anmahian Winton Architects	Community Rowing, Inc.	Brighton
2010	William Rawn Associates, Architects, Inc. with Ann Beha Architects	Cambridge Public Library	Cambridge
2011	Kyu Sung Woo Architects	10 Akron Street at Memorial Drive	Cambridge
2012	Fumihiko Maki | Maki and Associates with Leers Weinzapfel Associates	MIT Media Lab	Cambridge
2013	Jonathan Levi Architects, Lead Design Architect/Architect of Record with Burt Hill Architects (now Stantec), Associated Architect	Roger E. Wellington Elementary School	Belmont
2014	Foster + Partners with CBT Architects	The Art of the Americas Wing - Museum of Fine Arts, Boston	Boston
2015	Renzo Piano Building Workshop with Stantec	Isabella Stewart Gardner Museum Addition	Boston
2016	Mecanoo Architecten with Sasaki	Bruce C. Bolling Municipal Building	Boston
2017	William Rawn Associates, Architects, Inc.	Boston Public Library, Johnson Building Transformation	Boston
2018	Payette	Interdisciplinary Science and Engineering Complex	Boston
2019	Hopkins Architects with Bruner/Cott	The Richard A. and Susan F. Smith Campus Center, Harvard University	Cambridge
2020	Jonathan Levi Architects	Dearborn STEM Academy	Boston
2021	Renzo Piano Building Workshop with Payette	Harvard Art Museums Renovation and Expansion, Harvard University	Cambridge
2022	Studio Echelman	As If It Were Already Here	Boston
2023	William Rawn Associates	Berklee Tower, Berklee College of Music	Boston
2024	Utile, Inc.	Roxbury Branch of the Boston Public Library	Roxbury
