= Carl B. Stokes United States Courthouse =

Carl B. Stokes U.S. Courthouse
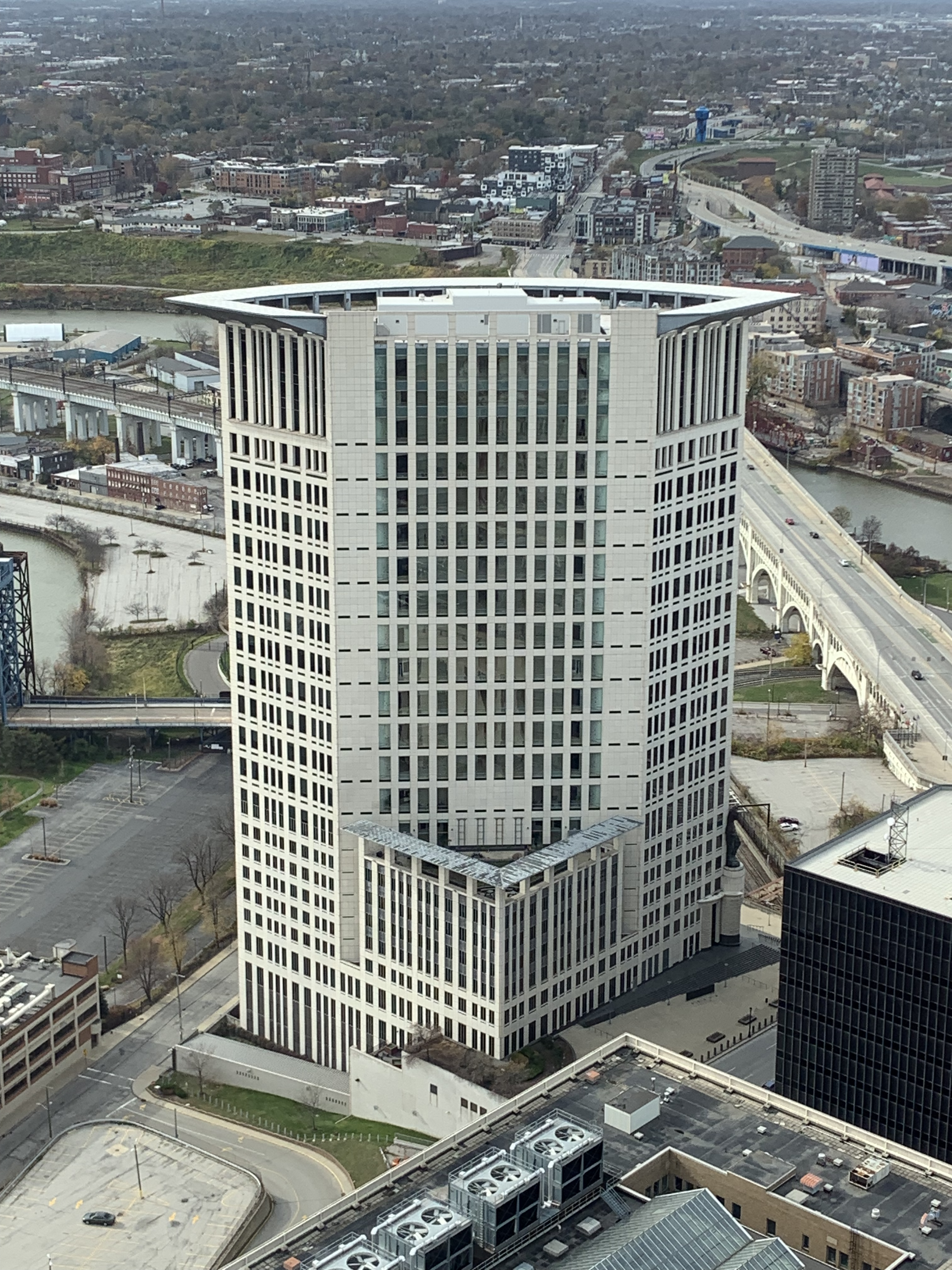
- View of the courthouse from the Terminal Tower observation deck
- Interactive map of the Carl B. Stokes U.S. Courthouse area

General information
- Status: Completed
- Type: Federal courthouse
- Architectural style: Postmodern
- Location: 801 W. Superior Ave., Cleveland, Ohio, United States
- Coordinates: 41.496428°N 81.697458°W
- Groundbreaking: May 28, 1997
- Construction started: 1999
- Completed: 2002
- Landlord: General Services Administration

Height
- Height: 430 feet (130 m)

Technical details
- Floor count: 23

Design and construction
- Architecture firm: Kallmann McKinnell & Wood

The Carl B. Stokes Federal Court House Building is a skyscraper located in downtown Cleveland, Ohio. It is also known as the Carl B. Stokes Federal Court House Tower, Federal Court House Tower, and the Stokes Tower. The 23-story building is 430 feet (130 m) tall and is located at the corner of Huron Road and Superior Avenue. It is currently the fourth tallest United States courthouse in the country.

The tower is named after Carl Stokes, the 51st Mayor of Cleveland and the first African American mayor of a major city. Construction began in 1999 and was completed in 2002.

Tenants include the Cleveland-based federal circuit, district, and magistrate judges, the Clerk of Court for the Northern District of Ohio, the U.S. Probation and Pretrial Services Office, the offices of the United States Attorney for the Northern District of Ohio, the U.S. Marshal's Office, and the U.S. Department of Justice Antitrust Division's Cleveland Field Office, as well as the U.S. Immigration Court.

The building is adorned by Cleveland Venus, a 37-foot (11 m) tall, 11.5 ton bronze sculpture created by Ohio artist Jim Dine. The headless and armless statue is one of the sculptor's variations on the Venus de Milo.

== See also ==
- List of tallest buildings in Cleveland
