= Foley catheter =

Medical device

- Diagram of a Foley catheter
- [edit on Wikidata]

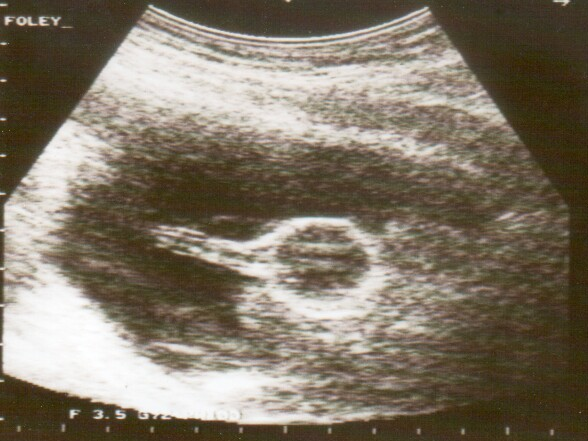
Ultrasound image of a Foley catheter

In urology, a Foley catheter is one of many types of urinary catheter (UC). The Foley catheter was named after Frederic Foley, who produced the original design in 1929. A Foley catheter is an indwelling UC, often referred to as an IDC or sometimes IDUC. This is in contrast to in/out catheters, which have a single tube and no valves, and are designed to go into the bladder, drain it, and come straight back out. A UC comprises a flexible tube if it is indwelling and is intended to remain in place, or made of rigid materials (glass or plastic) if it is the in/out type. In use, a clinician or, often, the patient themselves in the case of in/out UC, passes the device through the urethra and into the bladder to drain urine.

Foley and similar brand catheters usually have two separated channels, or lumina (or lumen), running down their length. One lumen, with opening at each ends, drains urine into a collection bag. The other has a valve on the outside end and connects to a balloon at the inside tip. The balloon is inflated with sterile water or saline while inside the bladder to prevent it from slipping out. A "three-way" urinary catheter has three lumens and thereby permits bladder washouts, such as are required post prostate surgery: the additional lumen is for saline flow in (bladder washout solution), the other two being for urine flow out and balloon inflation as in the two-way variety.

Manufacturers usually produce Foley catheters using silicone or coated natural latex. Coatings include polytetrafluoroethylene, hydrogel, or a silicone elastomer – the different properties of these surface coatings determine whether the catheter is suitable for 28-day or 3-month indwelling duration.

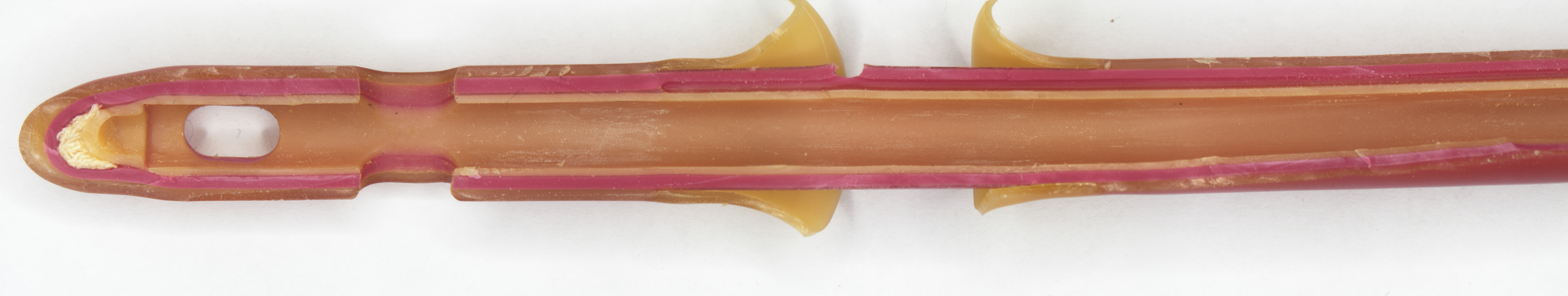
A section cut of the distal end of a Foley catheter. The image shows a burst balloon, balloon lumen, and main drain lumen.

Indwelling catheters/IDCs should be used only when indicated, as use increases the risk of catheter-associated urinary tract infection (UTI) and other adverse effects. While female sex is generally recognised as a risk factor for UTIs, the differences in biological sex are reduced while carrying catheters.

== History ==
The name comes from the designer, Frederic Foley, a surgeon who worked in Boston, Massachusetts in the 1930s. His original design was adopted by C. R. Bard, Inc. of Murray Hill, New Jersey, who manufactured the first prototypes and named them in honor of the surgeon.

There are now multiple companies worldwide who produce IDCs and in/out catheters, made of a range of materials, such as silicone, plastic, latex. Due to the rise in latex allergies, medical equipment made of latex is becoming less common. There are, in rare cases, some glass in/out catheters in use today. Many older people who have been self-catheterising for a very long time prefer them to the plastic ones, one benefit being the reduction in waste.

Currently, in most countries, plastic in/out catheters have to be discarded after use. There is a study currently (2022) under way called "Single use versus reusable catheters in intermittent catheterisation for treatment of urinary retention: a protocol for a multicentre, prospective, randomised controlled, non-inferiority trial".

== Types ==
Indwelling urinary catheters come in several types:

- Coudé (French for elbowed) catheters have a 45° bend at the tip that facilitates easier passage through an enlarged prostate.
- Councill tip catheters have a small hole at the tip so they can be passed over a wire.
- Three-way, or triple lumen catheters have a third channel used to infuse sterile normal saline for irrigation. These are used primarily after surgery on the bladder or prostate, to wash away blood and blood clots.
- In/out catheters that are almost always made of a semi rigid plastic. The in/out catheters are simply a double open ended tube, with no valves. The average female would use a 10Fr to a 12Fr and the average male would use a 12Fr to 14Fr.

== Sizes ==
The relative size of an indwelling urinary catheter is described using French units (Fr). Alternatively, the size of a 10 Fr catheter might be expressed as 10 Ch (Charriere units – named after a 19th century French scientific instrument maker, Joseph-Frédéric-Benoît Charrière). The most common sizes are 10 Fr to 28 Fr. 1 Fr is equivalent to 0.33 mm = .013" = 1/77" of diameter. Foley catheters are usually color coded by size with a solid color band at the external end of the balloon inflation tube, allowing for easy identification of the size. Note: Colors for French sizes 5, 6, 8, 10 may vary significantly if intended for pediatric patients. Color for French size 26 may also be black instead of pink.

Color	French units	mm
Yellow-green	6	2.0
Cornflower Blue	8	2.7
Black	10	3.3
White	12	4.0
Green	14	4.7
Orange	16	5.3
Red	18	6.0
Yellow	20	6.7
Purple	22	7.3
Blue	24	8.0
Pink	26	8.7

== Medical uses ==
=== Urinary tract ===
Indwelling urinary catheters are most commonly used to assist people who cannot urinate on their own. Indications for using a catheter include providing relief when there is urinary retention, monitoring urine output for critically ill persons, managing urination during surgery, and providing end-of-life care.

Foley catheters are used during the following situations:

- On patients who are anesthesized or sedated for surgery or other medical care
- On comatose patients
- On some incontinent patients
- On patients whose prostate is enlarged to the point that urine flow from the bladder is cut off
- On patients with acute urinary retention
- On patients who are unable due to paralysis or physical injury to use either standard toilet facilities or urinals
- Following urethral surgeries
- Following ureterectomy
- On patients with kidney disease whose urine output must be constantly and accurately measured
- Before and after cesarean section
- Before and after hysterectomy
- On patients who have had genital injury
- On anorexic patients who are unable to use standard toilets due to physical weakness and whose urine output must be constantly measured
- On patients with fibromyalgia who cannot control their bladder
- On patients who have severe skin impairment and/or breakdown

=== Cervical ===
A Foley catheter can also be used to ripen the cervix during induction of labor. When used for this purpose, the procedure is called extra-amniotic saline infusion. In this procedure, the balloon is inserted behind the cervical wall and inflated, for example with 30-80 mL of saline. The remaining length of the catheter is pulled slightly taut and taped to the inside of the leg. The inflated balloon applies pressure to the cervix as the baby's head would prior to labor, causing it to dilate. As the cervix dilates over time, the catheter is readjusted to again be slightly taut and retaped to maintain pressure. When the cervix has dilated sufficiently, the catheter drops out.

=== Other ===
They are also used in cases of severe epistaxis (nosebleed) to block blood from freely flowing down the nasal passage into the mouth. Foley catheters are also used in abdominal surgery.

== Contraindications ==
Indwelling urinary catheters should not be used to monitor stable people who are able to urinate or for the convenience of the patient or hospital staff. Urethral trauma is the only absolute contraindication to the placement of a urinary catheter. Examination findings such as blood at the urethral meatus, or a high riding prostate necessitate a retrograde urethrogram prior to insertion.

In the United States, catheter-associated urinary tract infection is the most common type of hospital-acquired infection. While UTIs are generally more common among females, the risk factor associated to anatomy is reduced while carrying catheters, some studies even showing no significant differences between the sex. Indwelling catheters should be avoided when there are alternatives, and when patients and caregivers discuss alternatives to indwelling urinary catheters with their physicians and nurses then sometimes an alternative may be found. Physicians can reduce their use of indwelling urinary catheters when they follow evidence-based guidelines for usage, such as those published by the Centers for Disease Control and Prevention.

== Adverse effects ==
Catheterized bladders become colonized by microorganisms very quickly, with a daily incidence of 3-10%; after four days, between 10-30% of patients develop bacteriuria. Whilst the presence of a catheter does increase the incidence of bloodstream infections secondary to a urinary origin, there is a huge amount of unnecessary, and likely harmful, antimicrobial prescribing on the basis of detection of asymptomatic bacteriuria. The industry is moving to silver-coated catheters in an attempt to reduce the incidence of urinary tract infections, although there is limited evidence of efficacy. An additional problem is that Foley catheters tend to become coated over time with a biofilm that can obstruct the drainage. This increases the amount of stagnant urine left in the bladder, which further contributes to urinary tract infections. When a Foley catheter becomes clogged, it must be flushed or replaced. There is currently not enough adequate evidence to conclude whether washouts are beneficial or harmful.

There are several risks in using a Foley catheter (or catheters generally), including:

- The balloon can break as the healthcare provider inserts the catheter. In this case, all balloon fragments must be removed.
- The balloon might not inflate after it is in place. In some institutions, the healthcare provider checks the balloon inflation before inserting the catheter into the urethra. If the balloon still does not inflate after placement into the bladder, it is discarded and replaced.
- Urine stops flowing into the bag. The healthcare provider checks for correct positioning of the catheter and bag, or for obstruction of urine flow within the catheter tube.
- Urine flow is blocked. The Foley catheter must be discarded and replaced.
- The urethra begins to bleed. The healthcare provider monitors the bleeding.
- Catheterization introduces an infection into the bladder. The risk of bladder or urinary tract infection increases with the number of days the catheter is in place.
- If the balloon is opened before the Foley catheter is completely inserted into the bladder, bleeding, damage and even rupture of the urethra can occur. In some individuals, long-term permanent scarring and strictures of the urethra occur.
- Defective catheters may be supplied, which break in situ. The most common fractures occur near the distal end or at the balloon.
- Catheters can be pulled out by patients while the balloon is still inflated, leading to major complications or even death. This may occur when patients are mentally impaired (e.g. they have Alzheimer's) or are in a mentally altered state (e.g. they are coming out of surgery).
