= Fairleigh S. Dickinson =

American businessman and donor (1866–1948)

- Born: August 22, 1866; Core Creek near Beaufort, North Carolina
- Died: June 23, 1948 (aged 81)

Colonel Fairleigh Stanton Dickinson Sr. (August 22, 1866 – June 23, 1948) was an American businessman who was the co-founder of the Fortune 500 medical technology company Becton Dickinson and the named benefactor of Fairleigh Dickinson University.

== Biography ==
Born in Core Creek near Beaufort, North Carolina, he was the son of David Owen and Margaret Ann Tillman Dickinson. As a young man he was a sailor on a square rigger for two years, before moving to Elizabeth, New Jersey, where he worked for the Singer Sewing Machine Co. while attending night high school. After being associated with the Saugerties Manufacturing Company, Dickinson and Maxwell Becton founded their surgical firm in New York in 1897, and moved it to Rutherford several years later. It soon became one of the largest surgical instrument manufacturing concerns in the U.S. On December 20, 1916, he married Grace Bancroft Smith (1887–1973) in Rutherford, New Jersey, and in 1919 they had a son, Fairleigh Dickinson, Jr. (1919–1996) who would eventually go on to run his father's company and become a New Jersey state senator.

During World War I, Dickinson was inducted into the United States Army Reserve as a lieutenant colonel, working with the Army Medical Corps on supplying surgical instruments. In 1926 he was appointed a member of the War Department's business council with the rank of colonel. Colonel Dickinson was named chairman of the medical and surgical committees for the medical departments of both the Army and Navy in 1940 and was reappointed to the post in 1944.

From 1927 until his death, he was president of the Rutherford National Bank. He also was director of the American Surgical Trade Association for nineteen years and president of the Manufacturers Surgical Trade Association from 1919 to 1944. He was a charter member and past president of the Rutherford Rotary Club; a member of the Masons and the Knights Templar; and a member of the executive committees of the national and regional councils of the Boy Scouts of America. In 1938 he returned to his home town in North Carolina to build the Core Creek Community Church (now Core Creek Methodist Church) and Social Center Community Clubhouse.

In 1942, he used his wealth to found Fairleigh Dickinson College, which is today Fairleigh Dickinson University with four campuses, located in Madison/Florham Park, New Jersey; Teaneck/Hackensack, New Jersey; Wroxton, England; and Vancouver, British Columbia, Canada.

Dickinson was interred in Hillside Cemetery, in Lyndhurst, New Jersey.
