= Gerhard Kallmann =

German-American architect (1915–2012)

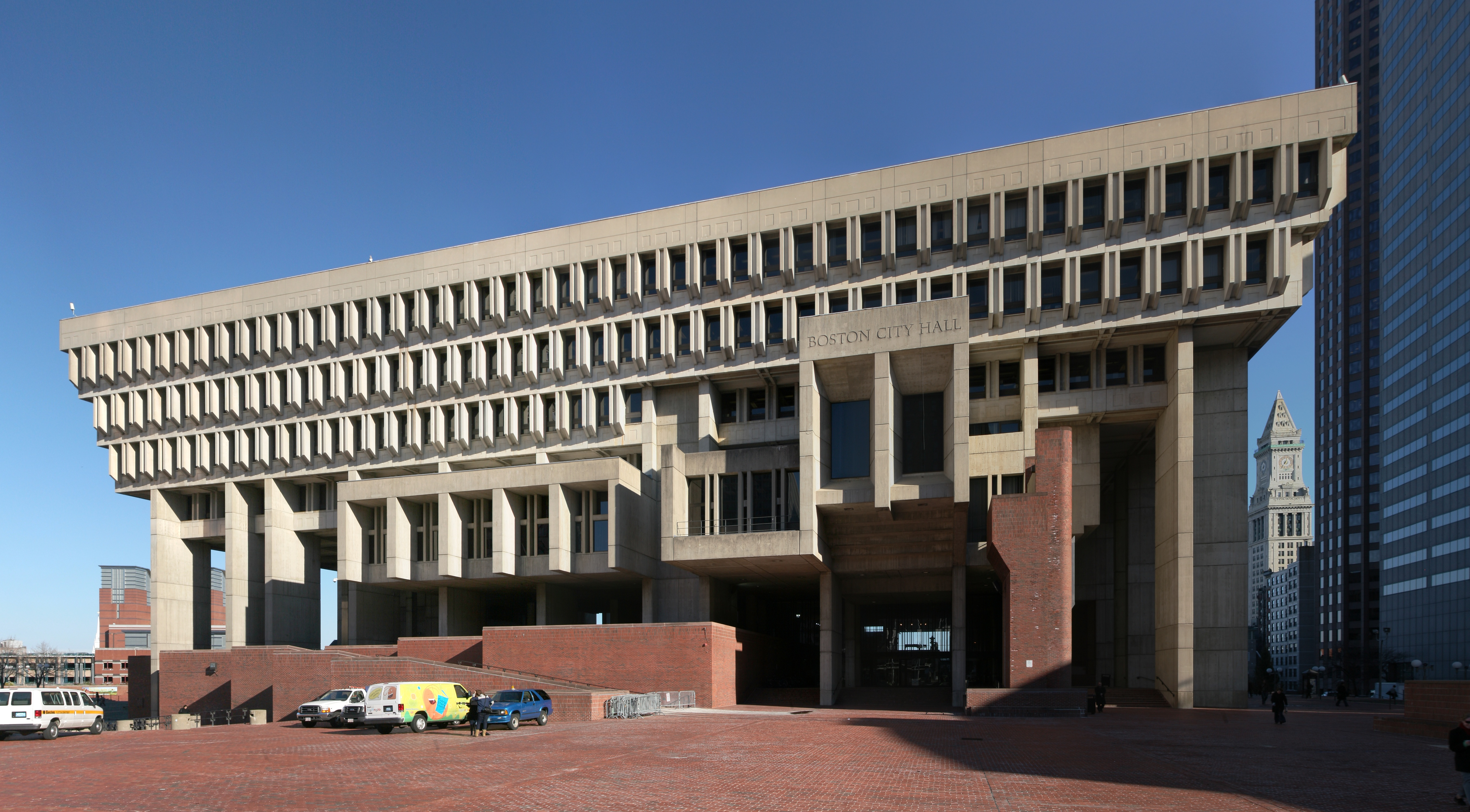
Boston City Hall

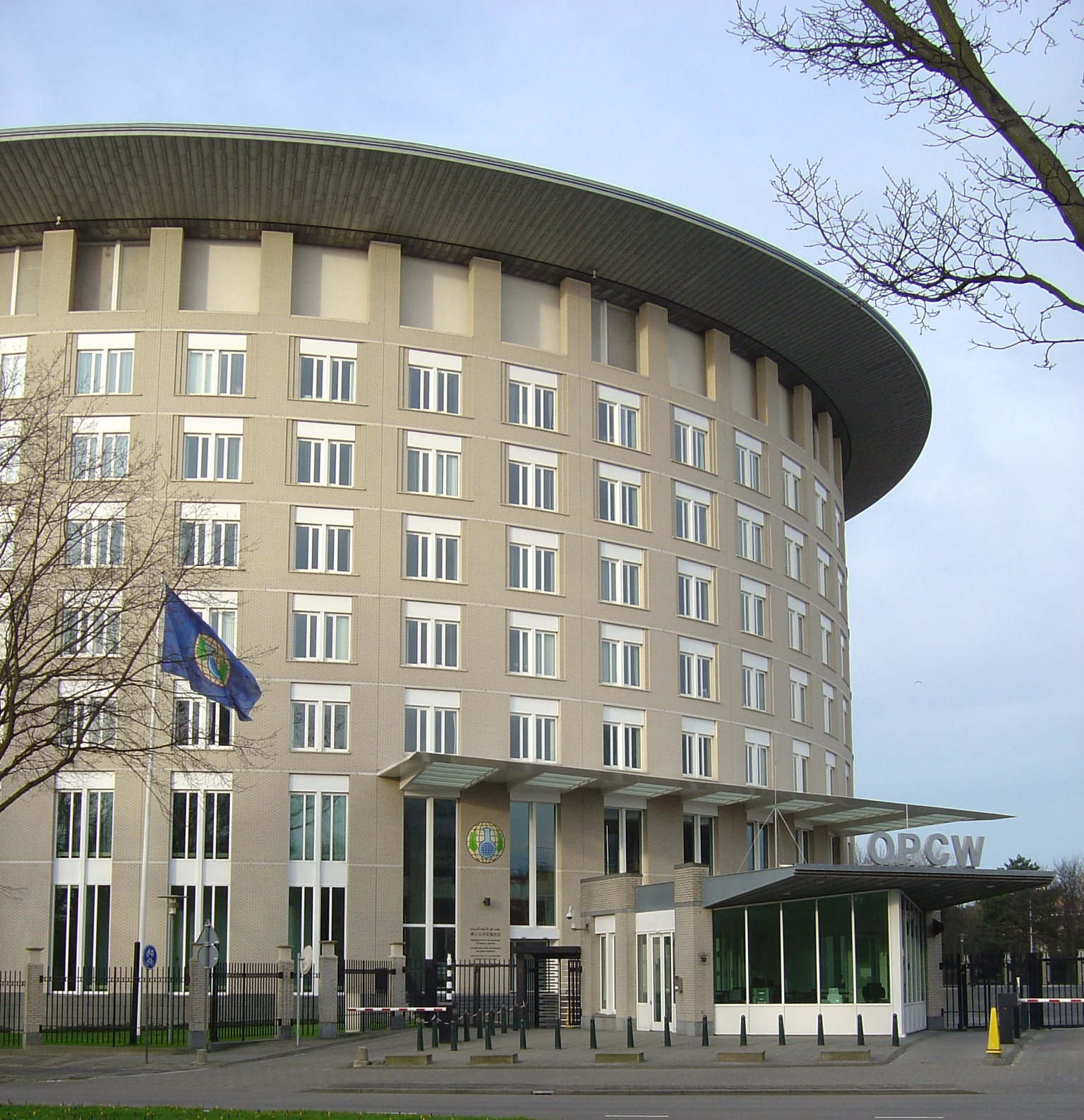
Organisation for the Prohibition of Chemical Weapons headquarters

Gerhard Michael Kallmann (February 13, 1915 – June 19, 2012) was a German-born American architect and academic. Together with Michael McKinnell, Kallman is best known as the lead designer of Boston City Hall, which was constructed in 1968 by their architectural design firm, Kallmann McKinnell & Wood.

== Life and career ==
Kallman was born to Theodore and Olga Jarecki Kallmann in Berlin, Germany, on February 13, 1915. His family was Jewish and intellectual. They moved to the United Kingdom in 1937 and Kallman enrolled at the Architectural Association School of Architecture in London. He immigrated to the United States with his family in 1948. He began teaching at the Chicago Institute of Design less than one year after arriving in the U.S. Kallman became an assistant professor of architecture at Columbia University in 1954.<Central Files, Butler Library, Columbia University>

In the early 1960s, Boston Mayor proposed a new city hall as part of plan to revitalize a declining section of the city's downtown. A competition was held to design a new city hall. Kallman, then a professor at Columbia University, and Michael McKinnell, a Columbia graduate student submitted a design for the proposed Boston City Hall in 1962. Kallman and McKinnell defeated many established, better known architects to win the contest for the new city hall. Kallman and McKinnell founded their new firm in 1962 shortly after winning the competition, Kallmann, McKinnell & Knowles (now called Kallmann, McKinnell & Wood), and moved to Boston to work on their city hall design. Influences for city hall, a large concrete structure, included the Le Corbusier’s monastery at La Tourette, France.

Boston City Hall, which they designed in a New Brutalism style popular in 1960s, was completed in 1968. Though controversial and even derided among some Bostonians, who have called it a "giant concrete harmonica" and a "dungeon," Boston City Hall had an important impact on the city. While called a "hall of shame" by the urban planning nonprofit, Project for Public Spaces, a 1976 survey of architects named it one of the top ten buildings in the United States.

Kallman remained best known for Boston City Hall. However, he also designed the headquarters of the Organisation for the Prohibition of Chemical Weapons in The Hague and the Embassy of the United States in Bangkok, Thailand. Kallman also designed entire campuses for the University of California and buildings for Ohio State University and Brandeis University.

Gerhard Kallmann died in Boston on June 19, 2012, at the age of 97.
