= Aroa Biosurgery =

Regenerative medicine company background

- Type: Public
- Founded: 2008; 18 years ago
- Founder: Brian Ward
- Headquarters: Auckland, New Zealand
- Area served: Worldwide
- Key people: Jim McLean (Chairman), Brian Ward (CEO)
- Products: Medical and surgical products
- Number of employees: >270
- Website: aroa.com

Aroa Biosurgery Limited (formerly Mesynthes Limited) is a regenerative medicine company that develops, manufactures and distributes products for wound healing and soft tissue reconstruction. Aroa Biosurgery is headquartered in Auckland, New Zealand with a US office in San Diego, CA, and is listed on the Australian Securities Exchange (ASX: ARX).

The company, originally known as Mesynthes Limited, was founded in 2008 by Veterinarian Surgeon Dr Brian Ward (BVSc). The company develops and commercializes products based on its proprietary ovine forestomach matrix technology platform with products in wound healing (Endoform, Natural, Endoform, Antimicrobial and Symphony) as well as plastics and reconstructive surgery (Myriad Matrix, Myriad Forme, Myriad Morcells, Ovitex PRS) and repair of hernia (Ovitex and Myriad Ultra).

== Technology ==
Aroa Biosurgery develops medical devices using its proprietary ovine forestomach matrix (OFM) technology. OFM is a layer of decellularized extracellular matrix (ECM) biomaterial isolated from the propria submucosa of the rumen of sheep. OFM is used in tissue engineering and as a tissue scaffold for wound healing and surgical applications.

== History ==
- 2008 – Mesynthes Limited (Wellington, New Zealand) was founded by Brian Ward.
- 2008 – First patent of ovine forestomach matrix and reinforced biologics.
- 2009 – Endoform Natural™ cleared by the US FDA for treatment of acute and chronic wounds.
- 2010 – OFM first described in the scientific literature.
- 2010 – OFM reinforced biologics first described in scientific literature.
- 2011 – Partnership with Hollister Wound Care (Libertyville, IL) to launch and commercialize Endoform Natural™.
- 2012 – Partnership with Tela Bio Inc. to commercialize reinforced biologics.
- 2013 – OFM reinforced biologics (Ovitex®) cleared by US FDA for hernia repair.
- 2014 – Corporate headquarters relocated from Wellington New Zealand to Auckland New Zealand.
- 2015 – Company rebrands to Aroa Biosurgery Limited.
- 2016 – Ovitex® launched in USA in partnership with Tela Bio Inc (Malvern, PA).
- 2017 – Endoform Antimicrobial™ cleared by the US FDA.
- 2017 – Myriad Matrix™ cleared by the US FDA.
- 2018 – Endoform Antimicrobial™ launched in USA.
- 2018 – Aroa Biosurgery establishes a joint venture with Hydrofera LLC (Manchester, CT) to sell products for wound care and plastics and reconstructive surgery.
- 2018 – Aroa Biosurgery opens first US office (San Diego, California).
- 2019 – Myriad Matrix™ launched in USA for plastic and reconstructive surgery.
- 2020 – Symphony™ cleared by US FDA.
- 2020 – Aroa Biosurgery lists on the Australian Securities Exchange.
- 2021 – Joint venture with Hydrofera LLC dissolved and Aroa's direct sales expanded.
- 2021 – Myriad Morcells™ cleared by US FDA.
- 2021 – Myriad Morcells™ launched in USA for plastic and reconstructive surgery.
- 2022 – First scientific publication describing novel dead-space management negative pressure system.
- 2023 – Symphony™ launched in USA for advanced wound care.

== Awards ==
- 2009 – Bayer Innovators Award; awarded by Bayer New Zealand.
- 2011 – Supreme Award, Endoform by Mesynthes; awarded by Wellington Gold Awards.
- 2014 – Fastest Growing Manufacturer; awarded by Deloitte Fast 50.
- 2015 – New Zealand's Bioscience Company of the Year; awarded by NZBio.
- 2022 – Most Innovative Dressing or Device, Gold Award; awarded by Journal of Wound Care.
