= Michael McKinnell =

British-born American architect (1935–2020)

- Born: Noel Michael McKinnell; December 25, 1935; Salford, England
- Died: March 27, 2020 (aged 84); Rockport, Massachusetts, U.S.
- Education: Salford Grammar School; University of Manchester; Columbia University
- Occupation: Architect
- Practice: Kallmann McKinnell & Wood
- Buildings: Boston City Hall

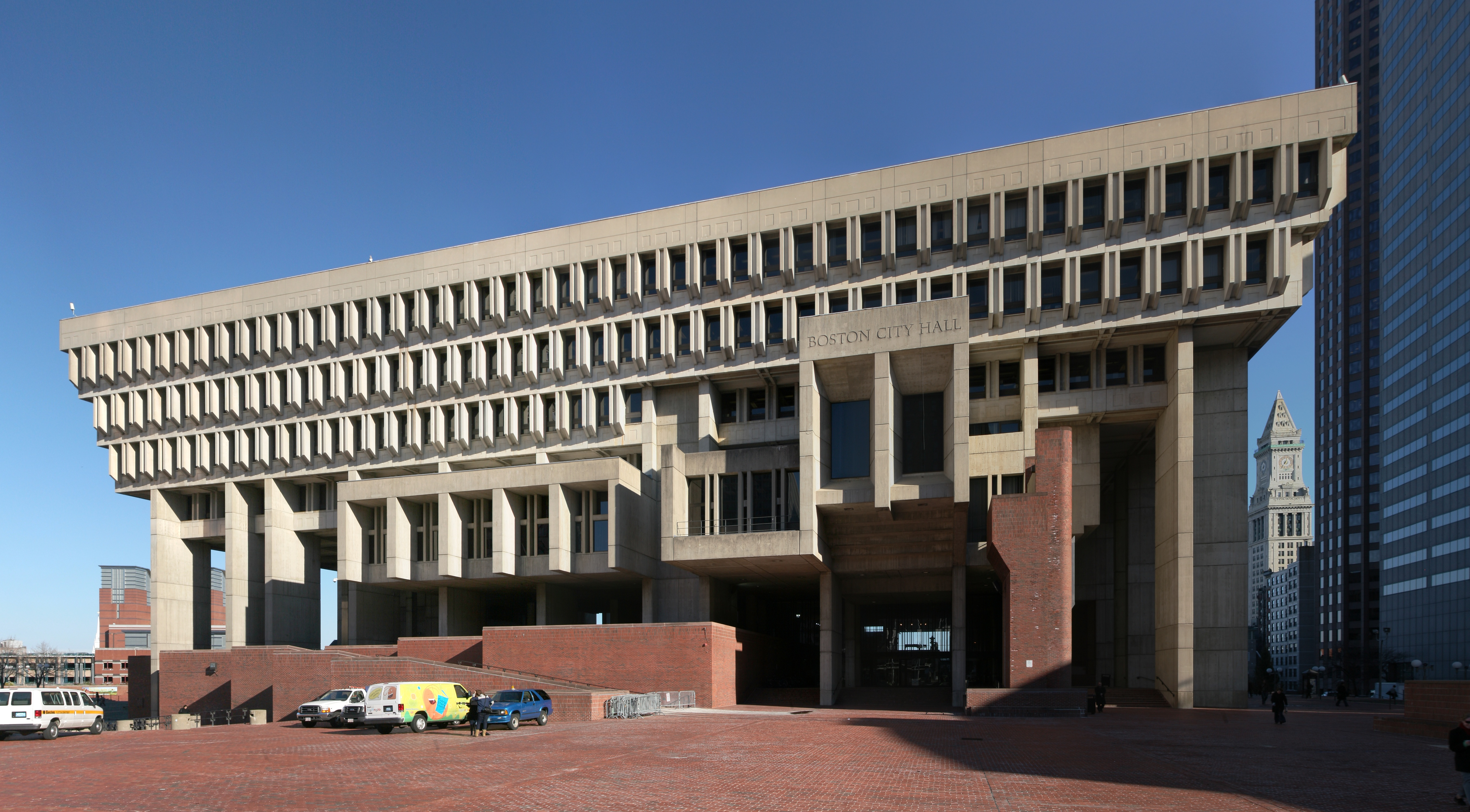
Boston City Hall

Noel Michael McKinnell (December 25, 1935 – March 27, 2020) was a British-born American architect and co-founder of the Kallmann McKinnell & Wood architectural design firm. In 1962, McKinnell, who was a Columbia University graduate student at the time, and Columbia professor Gerhard Kallmann submitted the winning design for Boston City Hall, which opened in 1968. McKinnell and Kallman moved to Boston shortly after winning the competition and founded their firm, now known as Kallmann McKinnell & Wood, in 1962.

== Early life and education ==
McKinnell was born on December 25, 1935, in Salford area of Manchester, England, His father was an accountant and war veteran. He graduated from the University of Manchester in 1958 with a first class degree in architecture. He studied architecture at Columbia University on a Fulbright Scholarship, graduating with a master's degree. At Columbia, McKinnell first met Gerhard Kallmann, who was then an associate professor to whom McKinnell was a teaching assistant. Kallmann and McKinnell entered a design competition for Boston City Hall in 1962, and won, beating 255 other submissions.

== Career ==
McKinnell's architectural firm, Kallmann McKinnell & Wood, was originally known for its design of concrete buildings, but in the late 1970s began to focus on other materials, as in the firm's design of the American Academy of Arts and Sciences headquarters in Cambridge, Massachusetts.

McKinnell's other projects have included Boston's Hynes Convention Center, and the Independence Visitor Center in Philadelphia, as well as embassies, courthouses, libraries, and buildings at numerous universities including Harvard, Yale, Princeton, and Emory. He served on the faculty of Harvard's Graduate School of Design for 25 years and as the Professor of the Practice of Architecture at the Massachusetts Institute of Technology. McKinnell has lectured and taught at many other universities, and in 1989 was the Architect in Residence at the American Academy in Rome. McKinnell received the Royal Manchester Institution Silver Medal and was recognized by the Boston Society of Architects with its Award of Honor in 1994. McKinnell was appointed to the U.S. Commission of Fine Arts in 2005 and served until 2011.

McKinnell Kallman & Wood has received eight honor awards and the 1984 Firm of the Year award from the American Institute of Architects.

McKinnell was a fellow of the American Institute of Architects, a fellow of the American Academy of Arts and Sciences, and a member of the Royal Institute of British Architects.

== Death ==
He died March 27, 2020, in Beverly, Massachusetts, from complications of COVID-19.

== Personal life ==
McKinnell married Jane D'Esopo in 1961; they had two children and subsequently divorced. McKinnell married Stephanie Mallis, his architectural partner, in 2003. In addition to his two children, McKinnell was survived by four grandchildren.
