= Richard J. Shaw =

American architect (1887–1958)

Richard Shaw
- Born: September 22, 1887; Boston, Massachusetts, United States
- Died: August 23, 1958 (aged 70); Cohasset, Massachusetts, United States
- Occupation: Architect
- Awards: Fellow, American Institute of Architects (1942); Harleston Parker Medal (1930, 1941, 1946 and 1956)

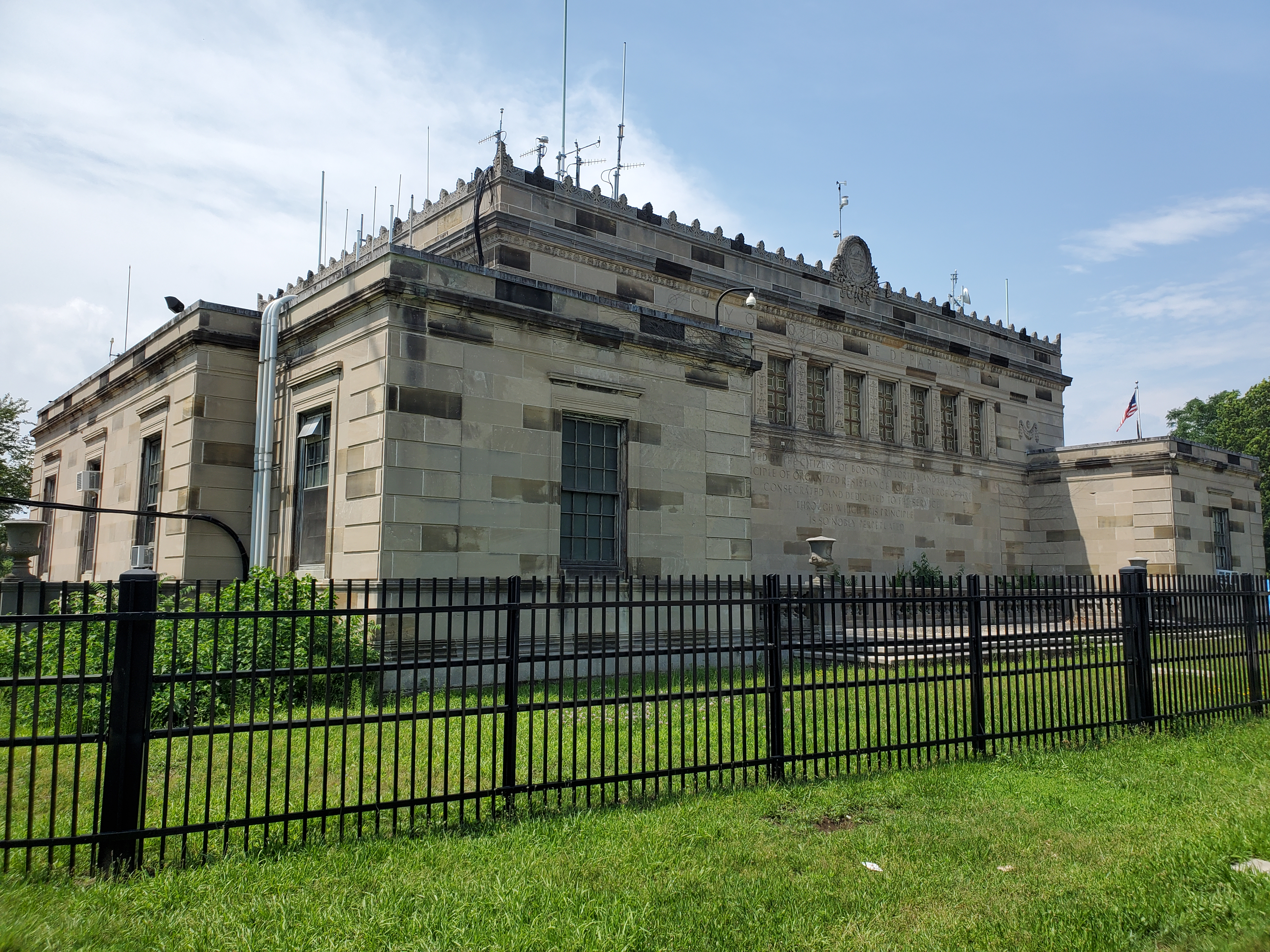
The Fire Alarm Office in the Back Bay Fens, designed by Shaw for O'Connell & Shaw in the Neoclassical style and completed in 1925

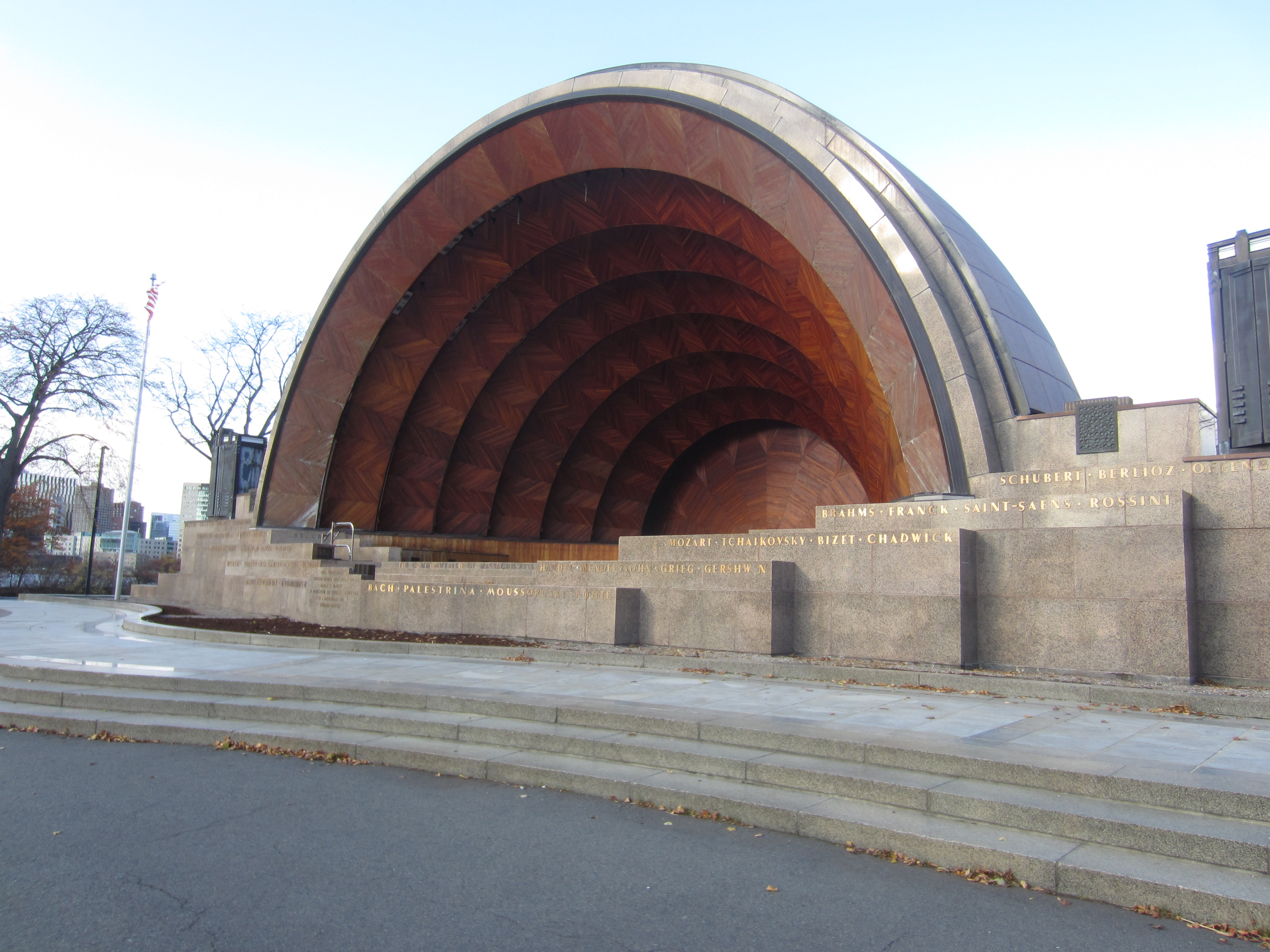
The Hatch Memorial Shell on the Charles River Esplanade, designed by Shaw in the Art Deco style and completed in 1940

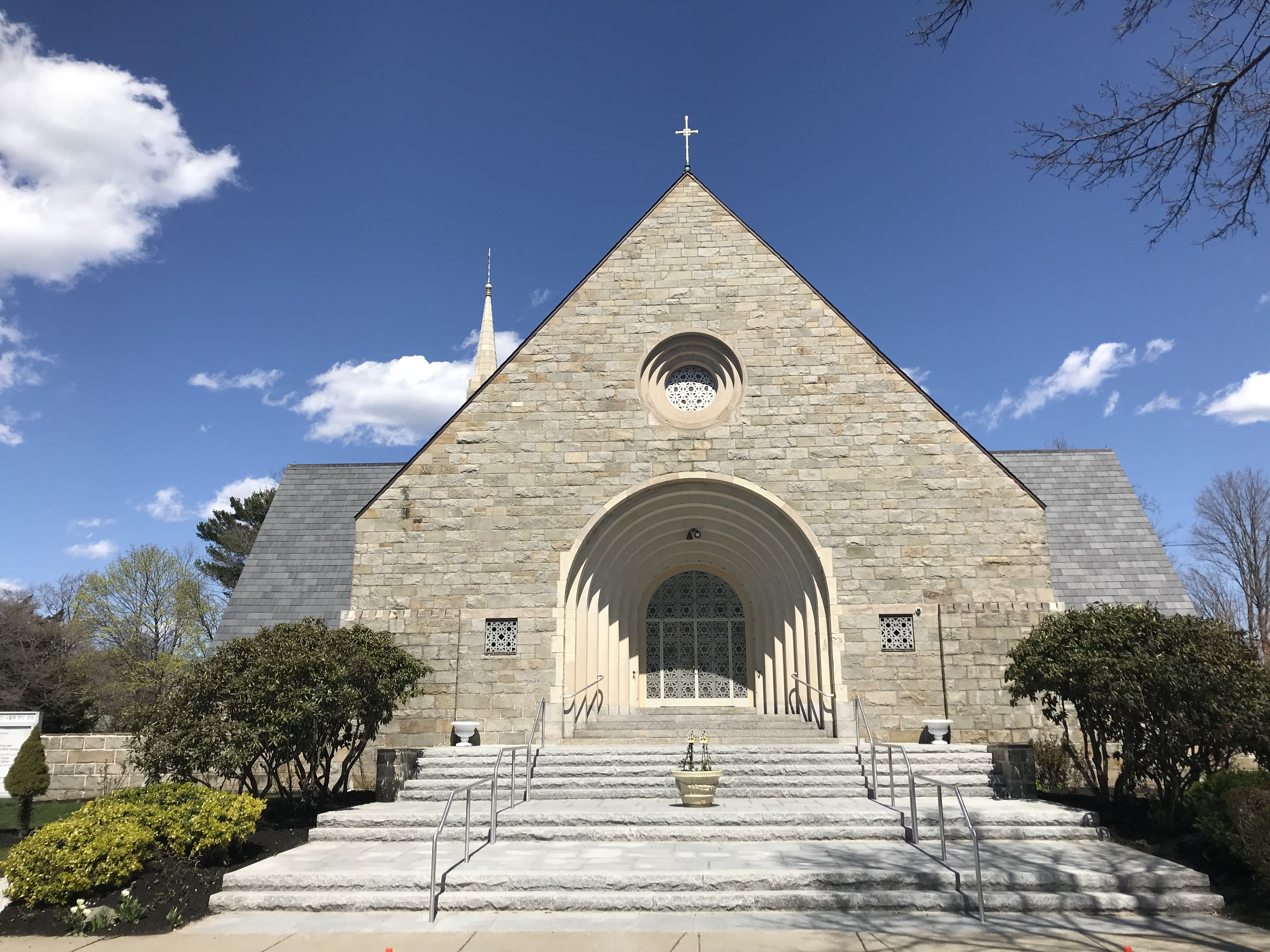
Corpus Christi Catholic Church in Newton, designed by Shaw in the Neo-Byzantine style and completed in 1955

Richard Shaw (September 22, 1887 – August 23 1958) was an American architect active in twentieth-century Boston. He specialized in the design of institutional buildings and churches, many of which were designed in partnership with Timothy G. O'Connell, and is best remembered for the Hatch Memorial Shell on the Charles River Esplanade.

== Early life and education ==
Richard Joseph Shaw, known professionally as Richard Shaw, was born September 22, 1887, in Boston to Thomas Shaw and Abbie Shaw, née O'Brien. He was educated in the Boston public schools. Shaw was a member of the Boston Architectural Club (BAC) and took advantage of the club's night classes in architecture and design. Through his activities with the BAC he was awarded a scholarship from the Architectural League of America, of which the BAC was a part, enabling him to study as a special student in architecture at Harvard University during the year 1910–11. Before and after his Harvard experience he was employed by architects Maginnis & Walsh and was their chief drafter from 1912 to 1917.

== Architectural practice ==
In January 1926 the Boston Globe noted that Shaw was "a close friend" of four-time Boston mayor James Michael Curley. In January 1918 Curley, in the final days of his first administration, appointed Shaw, then still a drafter, chairman of the Schoolhouse Commission. In February Curley was out and so was Shaw. Shaw spent World War I serving as a superintendent at Naval Station Newport.

In 1919 Shaw and architect Timothy G. O'Connell formed the firm of O'Connell & Shaw. O'Connell had been appointed architect of the West Roxbury Municipal Courthouse (1923) during the first Curley administration. The project had been delayed by the war and the architects completed it together. Through Curley's influence, O'Connell & Shaw received the largest number of major city design contracts during his second administration, including those for the Fire Alarm Office (1925) and the Brighton Municipal Courthouse (1927). During the last months of the administration they were also contracted to design the proposed L Street Bathhouse in South Boston and a hospital for chronic diseases on Parker Hill, both of which were canceled by the administration of Malcolm Nichols soon after taking office. In May 1926 city councillors alleged that the firm and their contractors may have been committing fraud in the completion of the Brighton courthouse, but this did not make it to legal proceedings.

The Curley administration had also approved a contract with O'Connell & Shaw to design the new Brighton High School (1930); which was not canceled. Construction did not begin until 1929 and the school was completed during the third Curley administration.

In 1930 Shaw and O'Connell dissolved their partnership and Shaw continued independently for the rest of his career. Shaw was a four-time recipient of the Harleston Parker Medal, given for outstanding architectural work in the greater Boston community. The awards were for the Immaculate Conception Convent (1927, demolished) in Malden in 1930, the Hatch Memorial Shell (1940) in 1941, St. Clement's Catholic Church (1942) in Medford in 1946 and Corpus Christi Catholic Church (1955) in Newton in 1956. His other works include the former Oratory of St. Thomas More (1935) on Franklin Street downtown, the rectory of the Cathedral of the Holy Cross (1937) in Boston and St. Mary's Catholic Church (1947) in Lynn.

Shaw was a Fellow of the American Institute of Architects (AIA), a director of the Boston Society of Architects, a president and director of the Massachusetts State Association of Architects and a director of the Boston Architectural Center. He was also a member of the Harvard Club and served the public as a member of the Massachusetts Art Commission and the Massachusetts Board of Registration of Architects

== Personal life and death ==
Shaw was married in 1916 to Lillian McMorrow. They lived in Brookline and Cohasset, where he died August 23, 1958, at the age of 70.
