= Kallmann McKinnell & Wood =

American architectural design firm

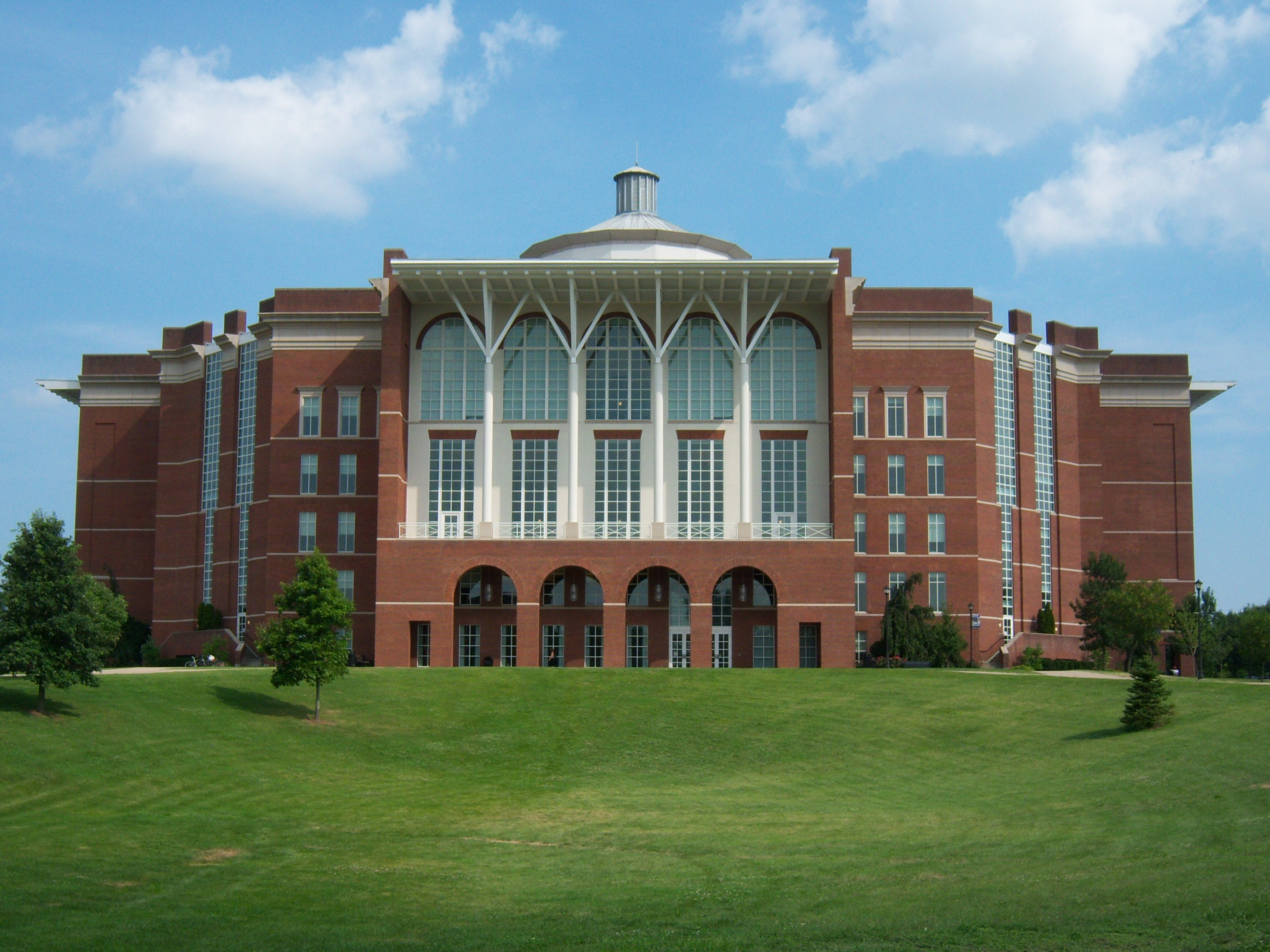
William T. Young Library of the University of Kentucky, Lexington, Kentucky (completed in 1998).

Kallmann McKinnell & Wood is an architecture firm based in Boston, Massachusetts, United States. It established in 1962 as Kallmann McKinnell & Knowles by Gerhard Kallmann (1915-2012), Michael McKinnell (1935–2020), and Edward Knowles.

== History ==
The firm originated when it won an international competition to design the Boston City Hall in 1962. Soon reconstituted as Kallmann McKinnell and Wood, ("Kallmann, the eldest member of the team, [is] German born and English educated. ... McKinnell [is] English born and educated. ... Both have served as ... educators at the Harvard Graduate School of Design." Henry A. Wood "joined the firm in 1965.") the firm would go on to design structures across the United States and abroad.

While the firm's "early period" consisted of bold structures of poured and pre-cast concrete, its later innovative work more often utilized brick, stone, copper, slate and cast stone, among other materials, for buildings that were less Brutalist in style and more postmodernist. In particular, the American Academy of Arts and Sciences in Cambridge, Massachusetts, established KMW's new direction with a copper-roofed villa set amidst a stand of woods. The course of the firm's work through the late 1980s was charted in Alex Krieger's exhibition at Harvard's Graduate School of Design and published in the catalog that he edited, The Architecture of Kallmann McKinnell & Wood. In 2004, David Dillon's tome of the same title carried the office's work through the early 21st century.

KMW buildings have won the Harleston Parker Medal, given out for the best new building in Greater Boston, more times than any other firm in the history of the medal, as documented in the major exhibit of KMW's original drawings for Boston City Hall, from 2008. Drawn from the KMW archive in the collection of Historic New England, this exhibition was presented at the Wentworth Institute of Technology in Boston and organized by architect Gary Wolf.

=== Boston City Hall ===
Boston City Hall and City Hall Plaza, built 1969 (photo 2008)

The firm's design for Boston City Hall was selected after a two-stage national design competition with 256 entrants. The jury composed of major architects and three prominent Boston businessmen unanimously chose the project because of its logical and successful handling of the competition's complex building program, because of its inventive response to the urban site, and because of its powerful symbolism of a "New Boston." Boston historian Walter Muir Whitehill proclaimed the KMK design to be "as fine a building for its time and place as Boston has ever produced." Horizon Magazine lauded both the design and the competition process itself: "Boston's jury...has turned in a decisive verdict that will stand for some time as a model of responsible civic conduct."

With its concrete massing echoing in an abstract fashion not only the classical cornices of ancient Greece but also the Neo-Classical forms of Federal Boston, and with its brick base creating a continuity with the nearby masonry structures of the Blackstone Block, the building engaged the historic city in ways that the other competition entries did not.

Shortly after the building's opening, New York Times architecture critic Ada Louise Huxtable wrote: "Boston can celebrate with the knowledge that it has produced a superior public building in an age that values cheapness over quality as a form of public virtue. It also has one of the handsomest buildings around, and thus far, one of the least understood.... It is a product of this moment and these times.... The result is a tough and complex building for a tough and complex age, a structure of dignity, humanism, and power." Public opinion has been mixed, and remains so to this day.

In breaking with the smooth, curtain-wall surfaces and the simplified forms of the then-popular post-Miesian corporate modernism, Kallmann, McKinnell and Knowles' design asserted the civic presence of City Hall on the large surrounding plaza. McKinnell spoke of how concrete allowed architects to return to early modernist principles of truthful expression of structure and materials, while reacting critically to the corporate architectural establishment of the time. "After we won the City Hall competition, we were walking along Madison Avenue, and we spied [Philip] Johnson coming towards us, waving his arms in typical Johnsonian fashion. 'Ah! I'm so happy for you two young boys who have won this competition. Absolutely marvelous. I think it's wonderful. And it's so ugly!' We thought that was the greatest praise we could get."

City Hall was published internationally both at the time of its design and upon its completion, and popular publications and tourist guide books featured the building prominently, but unlike the Gateway Arch in St. Louis and Sydney's Opera House (also products of widely publicized design competitions), Boston City Hall never became a symbol of the city, except perhaps in a negative way. Although some tried to associate it with the city's successful reinvention of itself following decades of decline, this never caught on. For many it became symbolic of all that was wrong with Boston's government: rigid, mean, and uncaring of the masses. Said McKinnell: "As we all know, Boston's mayor wants to sell or preferably tear down City Hall. But as [structural engineer] Bill LeMessurier once said, it will take a controlled nuclear device to get rid of this building. So in a very real way, perhaps, we have made our legacy using concrete because it is so bloody difficult to get rid of.... We were right in the sense that architecture had to be rethought as something which is long-lived and, over time, could be decorated, embellished, and adorned by subsequent generations."

== Designs ==
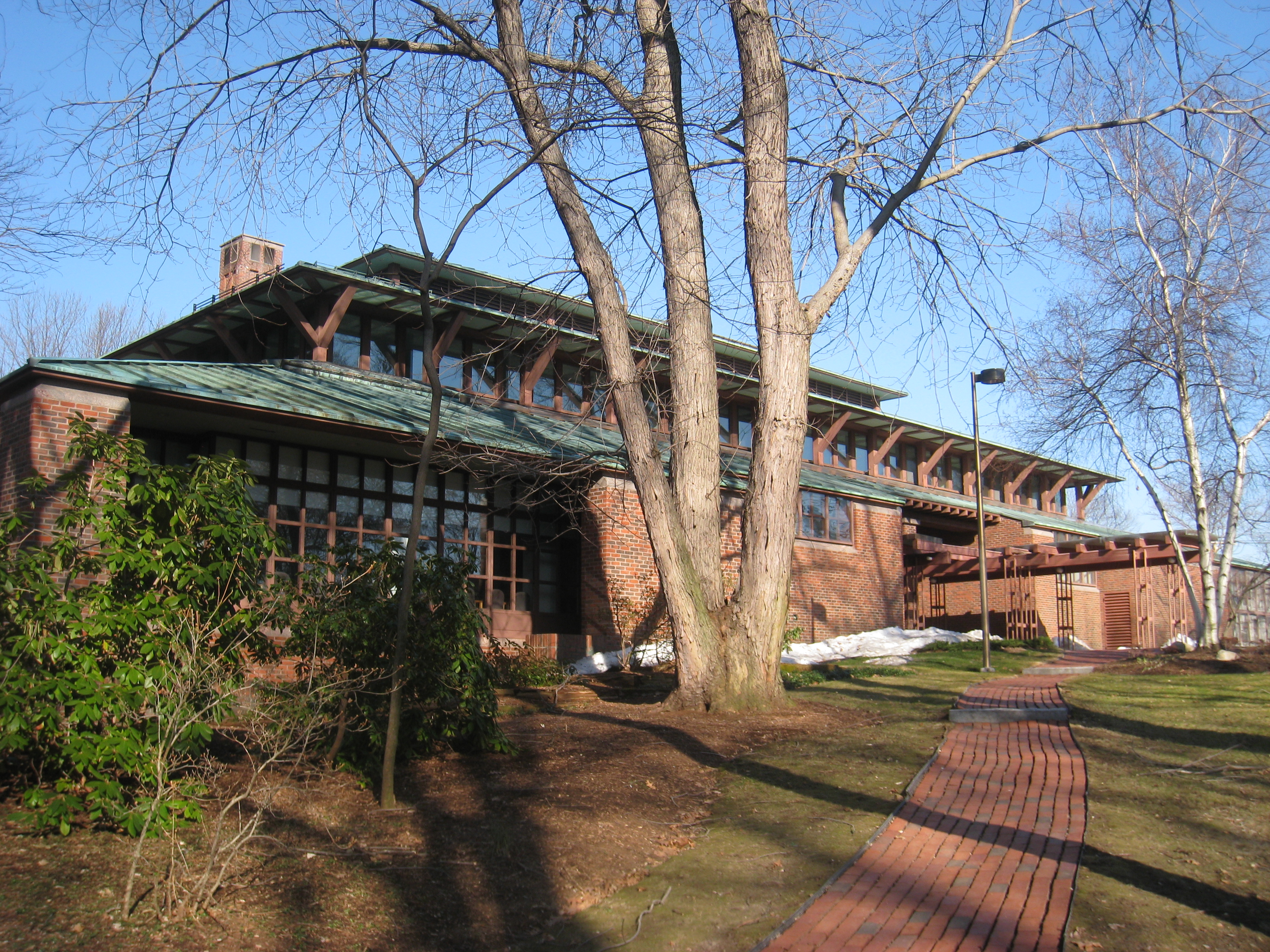
American Academy of Arts and Sciences Building.

Blanton Museum of Art at the University of Texas at Austin in 2014.

After being established to see Boston City Hall through to completion, Kallmann McKinnell & Wood continued to design major buildings in Boston, throughout New England, and world-wide. Locally, its many buildings range from Newton, with the City's Public Library, to Boston's Columbia Point, with the University of Massachusetts Boston Campus Center. In New Jersey, the Becton Dickinson corporate headquarters can be found. The Embassy of the United States in Bangkok, Thailand. The Krieger and Dillon volumes provide comprehensive overviews of the firm's work.

- Boston City Hall and City Hall Plaza, Boston, Massachusetts
- Becton, Dickinson and Company headquarters
- Carl B. Stokes United States Courthouse, Cleveland Ohio
- Back Bay (MBTA station), Boston, Massachusetts
- Blanton Museum of Art
- University of Massachusetts Boston, Boston, Massachusetts
- Phillips Exeter Academy athletics building, Exeter, New Hampshire (1970)
- William T. Young Library, Lexington, Kentucky
- American Academy of Arts and Sciences, Cambridge, Massachusetts
- Mandel Center for the Humanities at Brandeis University (2010)

== Publications ==
- Dillon, David, The Architecture of Kallmann McKinnell & Wood, 2004, Edizioni Press.
- Krieger, Alex, editor, The Architecture of Kallmann McKinnell & Wood, 1988, Rizzoli.
