= Hatch Memorial Shell =

Concert venue in Back Bay

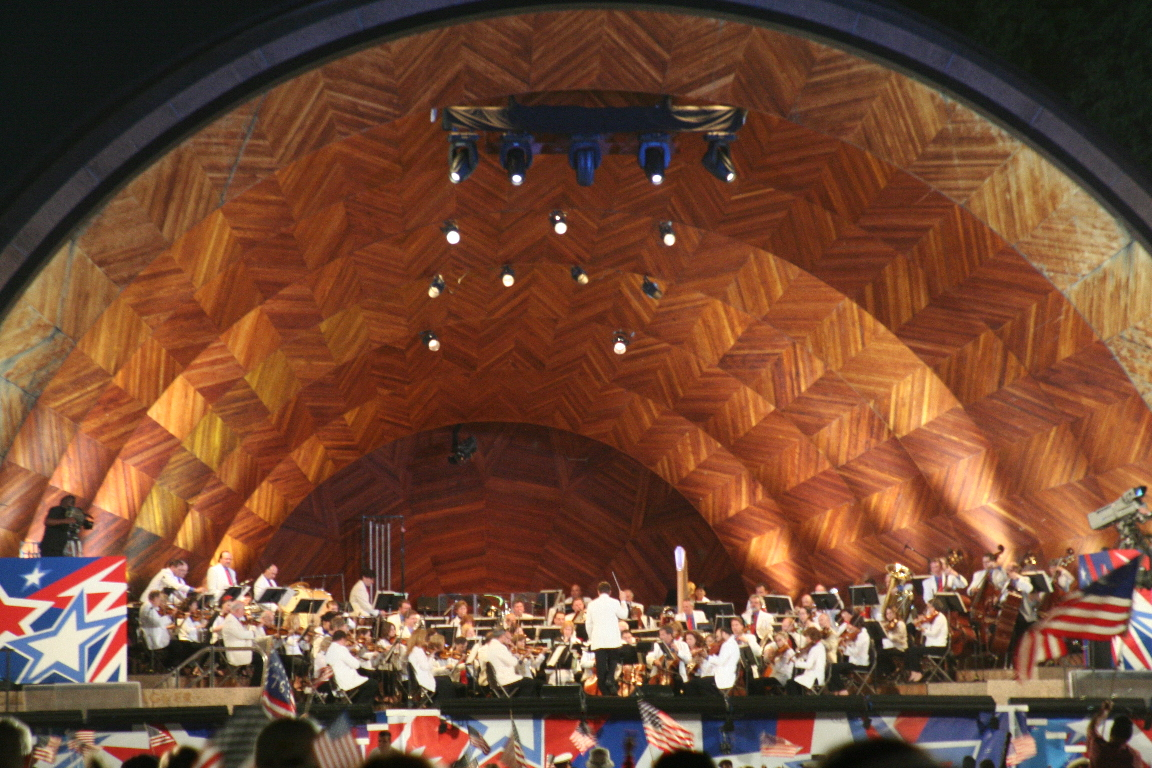
- The Boston Pops performing at the Hatch Shell on July 4, 2005
- Interactive map of Hatch Memorial Shell
- Former names: Edward A. Hatch Memorial Shell
- Location: Boston, Massachusetts
- Coordinates: 42.357311°N 71.073687°W
- Owner: Department of Conservation and Recreation
- Seating type: open
- Capacity: 10,000
- Type: Outdoor amphitheater

Construction
- Opened: 1928

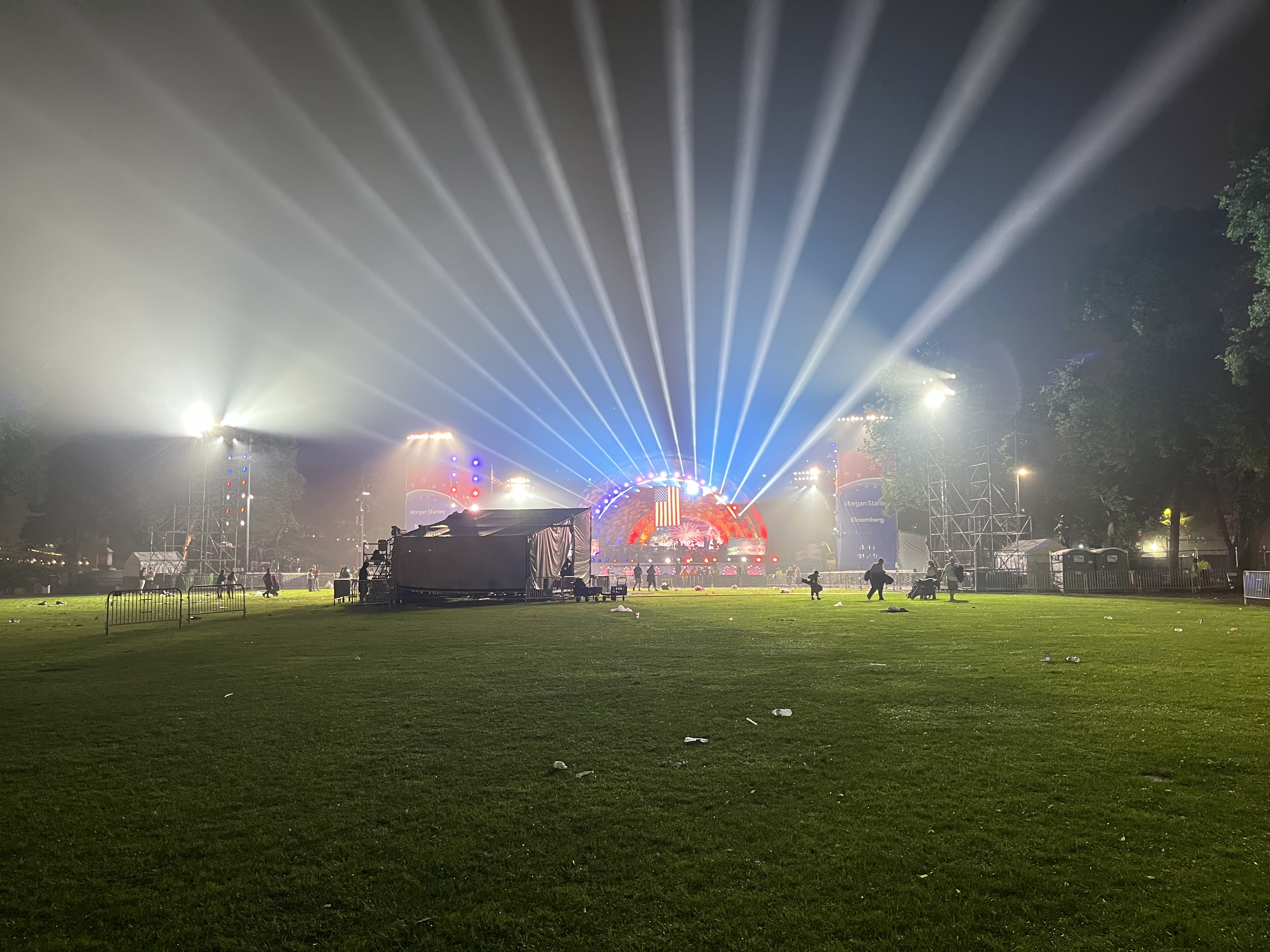
The Hatch Shell on a foggy night following Independence Day festivities in 2023

The Edward A. Hatch Memorial Shell, commonly referred to as the Hatch Shell, is an outdoor concert venue on the Charles River Esplanade in the Back Bay neighborhood of Boston, Massachusetts. Built in 1939–1940, it is one of the city's prominent examples of Art Deco architecture.

The Hatch Shell is best known for hosting the Boston Pops annually for the Boston Fourth of July celebration, but is also used for free concerts most weekends and many weeknights during the summer months. The grass pavilion in front of the stage has no permanent seating. There is a memorial nearby to Arthur Fiedler, first permanent conductor of the Pops.

== Name ==
The Hatch Shell is named in memory of Edward Hatch, the descendant of a family with deep roots in colonial Massachusetts and a fortune made in foreign trade. Hatch died in 1910, and his sister Maria died without descendants in 1926, leaving a substantial portion of her estate in a trust which was to be used for "a park, playground or memorial" in or near Boston that would be "open to the public at such times and under such circumstances as may from time to time best minister to the public need for a beauty spot." The executor of Maria Hatch's estate died before the terms of the trust could be executed, and it remained undiscovered until 1936, when Massachusetts Attorney General Paul A. Dever discovered it and instituted probate action to complete its terms. New trustees, selected by the court, determined that a permanent concert shell on the Charles River Esplanade would satisfy the terms of the trust. The Hatch Shell is commonly known to memorialize Edward Hatch, while Maria Hatch remains largely forgotten, despite the fact that it was Maria, Edward's sister and heir, who made the decision to bequeath the property to the city as a green space for public enjoyment 16 years after his death.

== History ==
The original, wooden shell was built in 1928 as a temporary venue for the Pops with expectations of construction of a permanent structure in the near future. It was first used for a concert on July 4, 1929, with Arthur Fiedler conducting the Boston Pops Orchestra. A second, temporary shell, made of metal, was built in 1934.

The permanent shell was designed by architect Richard J. Shaw, and was dedicated on July 2, 1940. In preparation for its 50th anniversary in 1991, it underwent significant renovation and repair along with modernization of its acoustics by Boston architecture firm Notter Finegold & Alexander. Bostonian Howard Brickman, a master craftsman specializing in wood floors, re-created the intricate interior paneling of the shell by hand.

An 8-foot (2.4 m) bronze statue of George S. Patton, by James Earle Fraser, commemorates the general's June 7, 1945 address at the site before a crowd of 20,000 persons.

Uses of the Hatch Shell include concerts, movie showings and speeches, and as a meeting place for large events, such as AIDS Walk Boston and the Larry Kessler 5K Run. The grass pavilion is used for picnics, casual sports and sunbathing, in a manner typical of urban parks.

The Hatch Shell underwent a $2.4 million renovation in 2018, the first since 1989. The exterior panels of the shell were replaced, which required a laser scan of the shell and fabrication of 673 separate panels in 93 different shapes.

== Architecture ==
The Hatch Shell is a wood-frame structure with a semicircular arched opening that is 40 feet (12 m) high and 110 feet (34 m) wide. It is fronted by a stone platform with stairs that extend the structure's width to 160 feet (49 m). On the front of this platform are engraved the names of famous (at least through the period of its construction) composers. The exterior of the shell is finished in terrazzo tile, and the interior is finished in wood. The interior floor consists of stepped tiers in semicircular form. The outside of the shell is ringed by a single-story flat-roof structure housing dressing rooms and storage facilities for performers.

List of 88 names of composers

Front

Half left

PUCCINI SULLIVAN STRAUSS SCHUMANN LOEFFLER MACDOWELL FOSTER DEBUSSY BEACH HERBERT GLUCK CHOPIN RAVEL WAGNER WEBER RIMSKY-KORSAKOV VERDI HAYDN MONTEVERDI DVORAK LISZT BEETHOVEN

Half right

BACH PALESTRINA MUSSORGSKY FOOTE HANDEL MENDELSSOHN GRIEG GERSCHWIN MOZART TCHAIKOVSKY BIZET CHADWICK WILLIAMS BRAHMS FRANCK SAINT-SAENS ROSSINI SCHUBERT BERLIOZ OFFENBACH GOUNOD

Rear

COUPERIN DINDY ELGAR DELIBES WOLF BUXTEHUDE BYRD CORELLI LASSO SCARLATTI VIVALDI BOCCHERINI CHERUBINI GRETRY LULLY BORODIN BRUCKNER CHABRIER SMETANA DUKAS FAURE GLAZUNOV RESPIGHI ROUSSEL SCRIABIN BELLINI DONIZETTI HUMPERDINCK LEONCAVALLO MASSENET MEYERBEER GILBERT GRIFFES HADLEY MASON ALBENIZ AUBER RUBINSTEIN STRAVINSKY SIBELIUS RAMEAU PURCELL MAHLER SOUSA PAINE
