= Ovine forestomach matrix =

Regenerative medical device platform

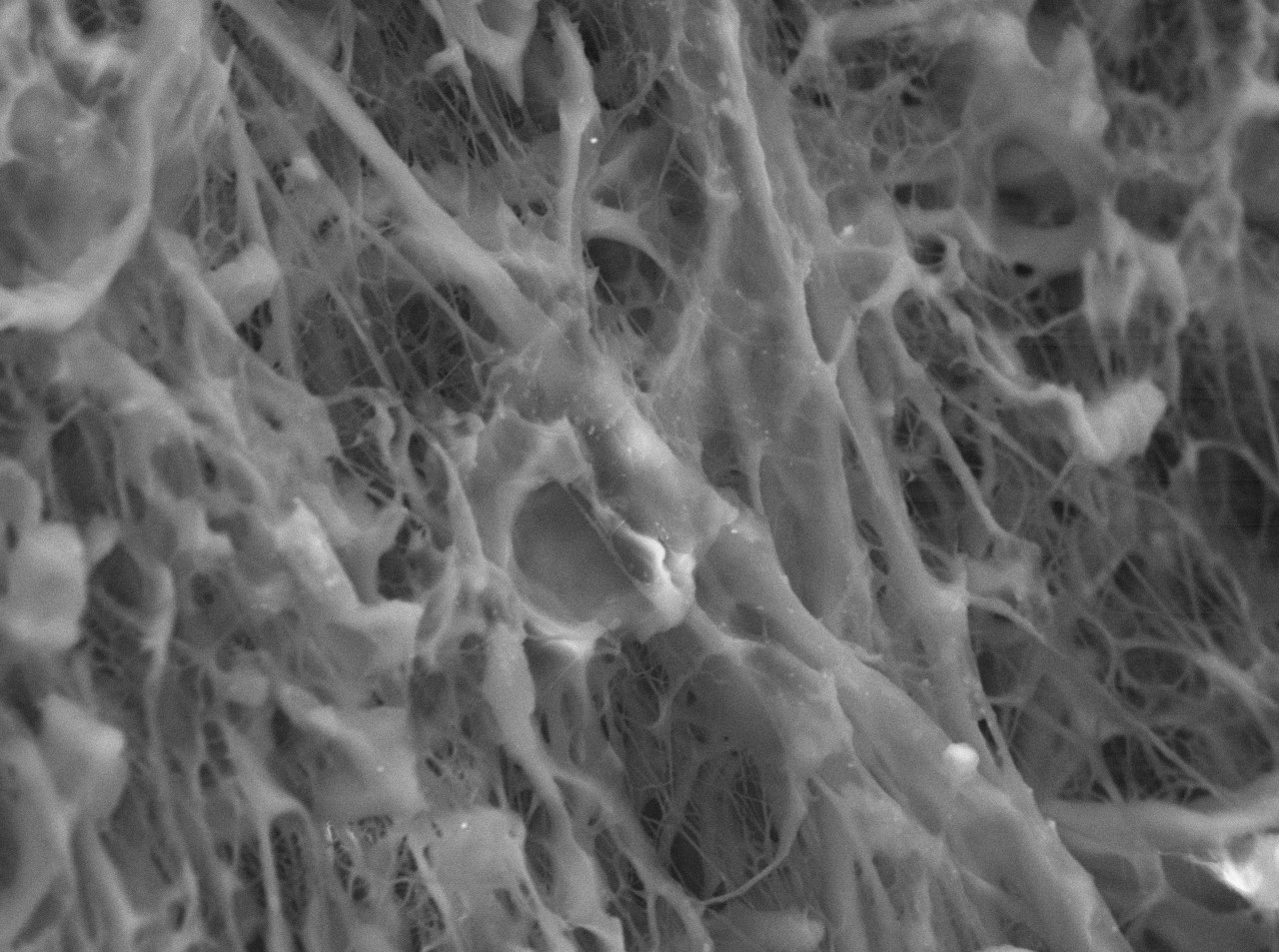
A scanning electron microscopy (SEM) image highlighting the complex collagenous microarchitecture underlying the luminal surface of OFM.

Ovine forestomach matrix (OFM), marketed as AROA ECM, is a layer of decellularized extracellular matrix (ECM) biomaterial isolated from the propria submucosa of the rumen of sheep. OFM is used in tissue engineering and as a tissue scaffold for wound healing and surgical applications.

== History ==
OFM was developed and is manufactured by Aroa Biosurgery Limited (New Zealand, formerly Mesynthes Limited, New Zealand) and was first patented in 2008 and described in the scientific literature in 2010. OFM is manufactured from sheep rumen tissue, using a process of decellularization to selectively remove the unwanted sheep cells and cell components to leave an intact and functional extracellular matrix. OFM comprises a special layer of tissue found in rumen, the propria submucosa, which is structurally and functionally distinct from the submucosa of other gastrointestinal tissues.

OFM was first cleared by the FDA in 2009 for the treatment of wounds. Since 2008 there have been >70 publications describing OFM and its clinical applications, and over 6 million clinical applications of OFM-based devices.

== Composition ==
OFM comprises more than 24 collagens (most notably types I and III), but also contains many growth factors, polysaccharides and proteoglycans that naturally exist as part of the extracellular matrix and play important roles in wound healing and soft tissue repair. The composition includes more than 150 different proteins, including elastin, fibronectin, glycosaminoglycans, basement membrane components, and various growth factors, such as vascular endothelial growth factor (VEGF), fibroblast growth factor (FGF) and platelet derived growth factor (PDGF). OFM has been shown to recruit mesenchymal stem cells, stimulate cell proliferation, angiogenesis and vascularogenesis, and modulate matrix metalloproteinase and neutrophil elastase. The porous structure of OFM has been characterized by differential scanning calorimetry (DSC), scanning electron microscopy (SEM), atomic force microscopy (AFM), histology, Sirius Red staining, small-angle x-ray scattering (SAXS), and micro computerized topography (MicroCT). OFM has been shown to contain residual vascular channels that facilitate blood vessel formation through angioconduction.

== Tissue engineering ==
OFM can be fabricated into a range of different product presentations for tissue engineering applications, and can be functionalized with therapeutic agents including silver, doxycycline and hyaluronic acid. OFM has been commercialized as single and multi-layered sheets, reinforced biologics and powders.

When placed in the body OFM does not elicit a negative inflammatory response and is absorbed into the regenerating tissues via a process called tissue remodeling.

== Clinical significance ==
=== Wound healing ===
Aroa Biosurgery Limited first distributed OFM commercially in 2012 as Endoform™ Dermal Template (later Endoform™ Natural) through a distribution partnership with Hollister Incorporated (IL, USA). Endoform™ Natural and Endoform™ Antimicrobial (0.3% ionic silver w/w), are single layers of OFM used in the treatment of acute and chronic wounds, including diabetic foot ulcers (DFU) and venous leg ulcers (VLU). Endoform™ Natural has been shown to accelerate wound healing of DFU. The wound product Symphony™ combines OFM and hyaluronic acid and is designed to support healing during the proliferative phase particularly in patients whose healing is severely impaired or compromised due to disease.

=== Complex plastics and reconstructive surgery ===
OFM was cleared by the FDA in 2016 and 2021 for surgical applications in plastics and reconstructive surgery as a multi-layered product (Myriad Matrix™) and powdered format (Myriad Morcells™). OFM-based surgical devices are routinely used in complex lower extremity reconstruction, pilonidal sinus reconstruction, hidradenitis suppurativa and complex traumatic wounds.

OFM-based surgical devices are routinely used in plastics and reconstructive surgery for the regeneration of soft tissues when used as an artificial skin.

=== Hernia repair ===
Multi-layered OFM devices, reinforced with synthetic polymer were first described in 2008 and in the scientific literature in 2010. These devices, termed ‘reinforced biologics’ have been designed for applications in the surgical repair of hernia as an alternative to synthetic surgical mesh (a mesh prosthesis). OFM reinforced biologics are distributed in the US by Tela Bio Inc. Clinical studies have shown that OFM reinforced biologics have lower hernia recurrence rates versus synthetic hernia meshes. or biologics such as acellular dermis.
