= BD (company) =

American biotechnology Company

Coordinates: 41.015834°N 74.210136°W

Becton, Dickinson and Company
- Trade name: BD
- Type: Public
- Traded as: NYSE: BDX; S&P 500 component
- Industry: Medical equipment, Consulting
- Founded: 1897; 129 years ago in East Rutherford, New Jersey, U.S.
- Founders: Maxwell Becton; Fairleigh S. Dickinson
- Headquarters: 1 Becton Drive, Franklin Lakes, New Jersey, U.S.
- Area served: Worldwide
- Key people: Tom Polen (chairman, CEO and president); Christopher DelOrefice (CFO)
- Revenue: ▲US$21.8 billion (2025)
- Operating income: ▲US$2.58 billion (2025)
- Net income: ▼US$1.68 billion (2025)
- Total assets: ▼US$55.3 billion (2025)
- Total equity: ▼US$25.4 billion (2025)
- Number of employees: 72,000 (2025)
- Divisions: BD Interventional; BD Life Sciences; BD Medical
- Website: bd.com
- Footnotes; Financials as of September 30, 2025.

Becton, Dickinson and Company (BD; also Becton Dickinson or Becton) is an American multinational medical technology company that manufactures and sells medical devices, instrument systems, and reagents. BD also provides consulting and analytics services in certain areas.

BD is ranked #211 in the 2024 Fortune 500 list based on its revenues for the fiscal year ending September 30, 2023.

== History ==
The company was founded in 1897 in New York City by Maxwell Becton and Fairleigh S. Dickinson. It later moved its headquarters to New Jersey.

In 2004, BD agreed to pay out US$100 million to settle allegations from competitor Retractable Technologies that it had engaged in anti-competitive behavior to prevent the distribution of Retractable's syringes, which are designed to prevent needlestick injury. The lawsuit touched off a series of legal conflicts between the companies. Retractable would accuse BD of patent infringement after BD released a retractable needle of its own. Later Retractable would claim BD was falsely advertising its own brand of retractable needle as the “world’s sharpest needle”.

In October 2014, the company agreed to acquire CareFusion for a price of US$12.2 billion in cash and stock.

In April 2017, Becton, Dickinson and Company announced it would acquire C. R. Bard. The transaction was completed later that year, and the company became a wholly-owned subsidiary of BD, rebranded as Bard.

In May 2021, BD announced that it would spin off its diabetes care business (https://investors.bd.com/news-events/press-releases/detail/85/bd-announces-completion-of-embecta-corp-spinoff). The spinoff was completed on April 1, 2022, to form Embecta Corporation. Embecta Corporation is a standalone public company focused on diabetes care. The name "embecta" represents the company's commitment to people living with diabetes and its corporate heritage, with the "em-" prefix evoking empathy for people living with diabetes and the empowerment of the new company and the "bect" imbibed from Becton. Becton, Dickinson and Company entered into an agreement with Embecta Corporation to be their sole supplier of cannulas through 2032. This agreement protects patents and intellectual properties of both companies ensuring the quality and integrity of Embecta Corporation's cannulas used in their products.

In July 2021, BD announced it would acquire surgical scaffold maker Tepha, after having acquired Velano Vascular earlier the same month. It acquired Leeds-based Tissuemed in December 2021.

In 2024, BD announced it would acquire Edwards Lifesciences' critical care unit for $4.2 billion.

== Finances ==
For the fiscal year 2017, Becton Dickinson reported earnings of US$1.030 billion, with an annual revenue of US$12.093 billion, an increase of 10.5% over the previous fiscal cycle. Becton Dickinson's shares traded at over US$192 per share, and its market capitalization was valued at over US$63 billion in November 2018.

Year	Revenue in mil. USD	Net income in mil. USD	Total Assets in mil. USD	Price per Share in USD	Employees
2005	5,341	722	6,133	44.554	
2006	5,738	752	6,825	52.89	
2007	6,283	890	7,329	63.81	
2008	6,898	1,127	7,913	67.23	
2009	6,987	1,232	9,305	58.34	
2010	7,124	1,318	9,651	64.62	
2011	7,584	1,271	10,430	70.38	
2012	7,708	1,170	11,361	68.57	
2013	8,054	1,293	12,149	90.12	29,979
2014	8,446	1,185	12,447	111.84	30,619
2015	10,282	695	26,478	137.28	49,517
2016	12,483	976	25,586	158.98	50,928
2017	12,093	1,030	37,734	192.11	41,933
2018	15,983	159	53,904		76,032
2019	17,290	1,082	51,765		76,093
2020	17,117	767	54,012		72,000
2021	20,248	2,002	53,866		75,000

== Business segments ==
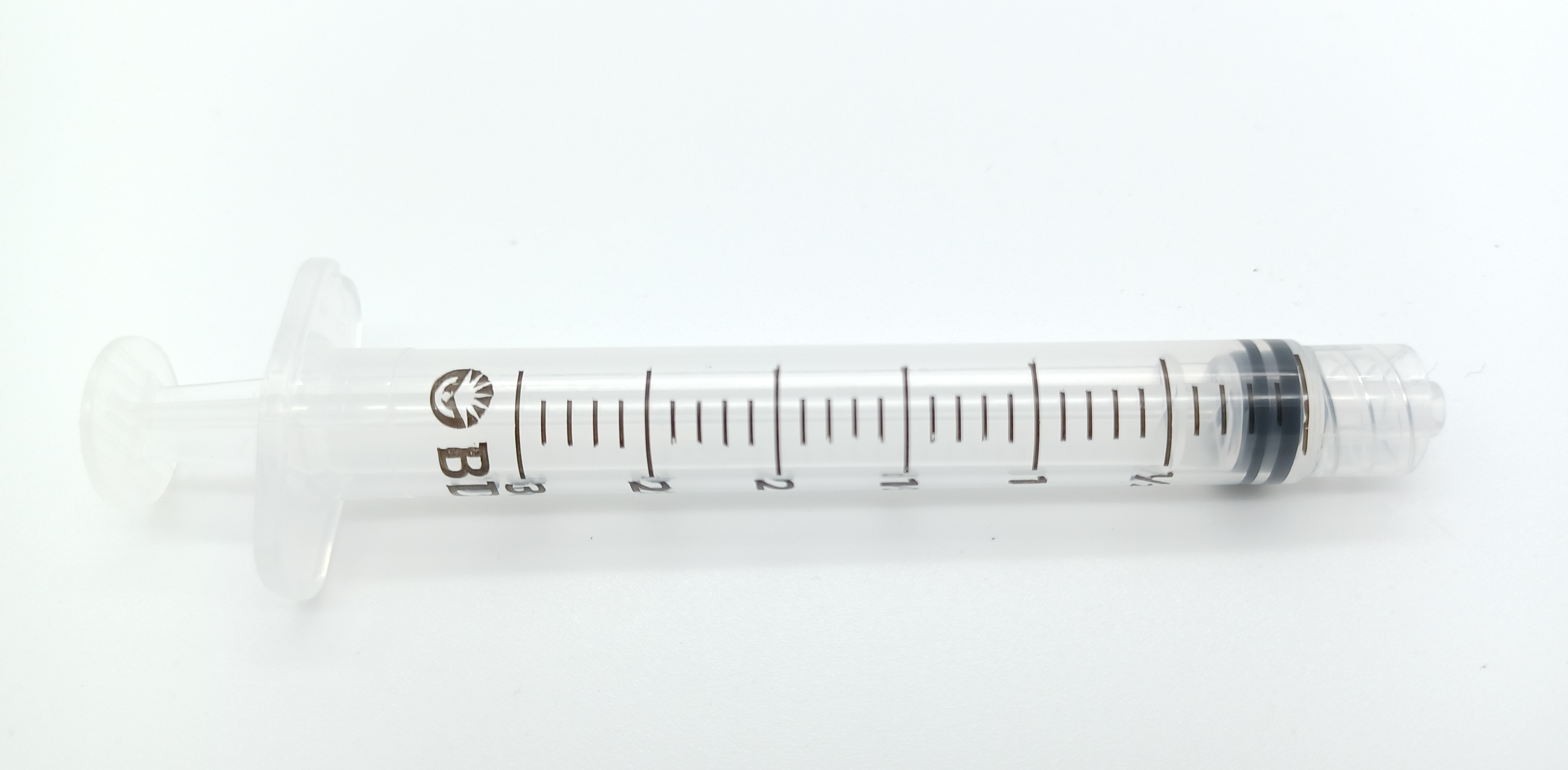
A syringe made by BD

Currently there are three business segments.

=== BD Medical ===
In certain places, BD Medical also offers consulting and analytics related services. BD Medical's Consulting services are primarily targeted at hospitals, healthcare systems and networks of healthcare providers.

=== BD Life Sciences ===
Business units include Biosciences and Integrated Diagnostic Solutions.

Offerings include preanalytical solutions for sample management; immunology research, including flow cytometry and multiomics tools; microbiology and molecular diagnostics; lab automation and informatics; and differentiated reagents and assays.

In February 2026, BD Life Sciences was spun out and combined with the businesses of Waters Corporation.

=== BD Interventional ===
The company's line of plastic conical screwtop test tubes, known as 'Falcon tubes', is popular and the term is sometimes used as a generic term for such tubes.

== Environmental and social track record ==
As of February 2010, BD was ranked 18th in the EPA Fortune 500 List of Green Power Purchasers. BD was also listed among the top 100 companies in Newsweek's 2009 Green Rankings ranking of the 500 largest American corporations based on environmental performance, policies, and reputation. BD placed third in the health care sector and 83rd overall. In addition, BD has been a component of the Dow Jones Sustainability World Index and the Dow Jones Sustainability North America Index for the four and five consecutive years, respectively.

Pfitzer et al. (2013) identify BD's development of a needleless injection system as an example of leading businesses' role in creating shared value.

=== Health and safety issues ===
In April 2016, the Occupational Safety and Health Administration fined BD US$112,700 for safety violations. They found repeat and serious violations of health and safety law that had resulted in two employees having partial finger amputations.

In 2020, C.R. Bard, Inc. and its parent company BD were fined $60 million USD for failing to adequately inform patients about health risks related to their transvaginal mesh devices.

== Recalls ==
=== 2007 Discardit II incident in Poland ===
In mid-2007, the firm's Discardit II series of syringes numbered 0607186 was withdrawn from hospitals and other medical services around Poland, about half a year after the discovery of remains of dark dust in some syringes, which were alleged to have been from this series. The newspaper Dziennik Online claimed that other series such as 06022444, 0603266, and 0607297 were also suspected of being contaminated. BD recalled and tested the syringes in question, and revealed sterile particulates in 0.013 percent of the products.

=== 2010 Q-Syte Luer and IV Catheter partial recall ===
In February 2010 BD announced a voluntary product recall of certain lots of BD Q-Syte Luer Access Devices and BD Nexiva Closed IV Catheter Systems. BD stated that the use of the affected devices may cause an air embolism or leakage of blood and/or therapy, which may result in serious injury or death. The approximately 2.8 million BD Q-Syte and 2.9 million BD Nexiva units containing 5 million BD Q-Syte devices that were recalled were distributed in the United States, Asia, Canada, Europe, Mexico, the Middle East, South Africa, and South America. The recall was initiated on Oct. 28, 2009 after BD received complaints of problems due to air entry through a part of the device. BD stated that the cause of the problem was manufacturing deviation and claimed that it corrected the problem. BD announced that it notified customers about the recall by letter and has been working with the U.S. Food and Drug Administration and worldwide health agencies to coordinate recall activities.

=== 2021 IV Giving Sets ===
In March 2021 BD announced a recall of infusion sets for CC, GP, VP, GW/GW800, SE, and IVAC 590 Alaris Pumps and gravity infusion sets and connectors following the news that a supplier falsified sterilisation documents going back ten years.

== Lawsuits ==
In October 2024, BD agreed to settle around 38,000 US lawsuits brought by plaintiffs who claimed they were injured by BD's hernia meshes.

In December 2025, BD was sued by Tela Bio Inc., makers of a ovine forestomach matrix hernia mesh, who alleged that BD engaged in anticompetitive practices to push Tela out of the market for surgical meshes while raising prices for providers and patients.

Viral Orlando delivery driver incident

On September 6, 2026, in Orlando, Florida, a man identified on social media as Eric Smith, reportedly an employee of medical technology company Becton, Dickinson and Company (BD), drew widespread criticism after a confrontation with a food-delivery worker was captured on video and circulated online.

The video gained significant attention after being shared by social-media commentator Tizzyent on Instagram. During the encounter, the man was recorded making racist remarks toward the delivery worker, demanding her name. The footage subsequently went viral, generating calls on social media for BD to investigate the incident and address the alleged conduct of its employee.

Social-media users subsequently identified the man as Eric Smith and linked him to BD.

Incident recap

The incident reportedly occurred around 8:30 p.m. in Orlando, Florida, while a female delivery driver was making a food delivery. According to the driver, a man confronted her for allegedly blocking the road during her delivery, before questioning her immigration status, making remarks about "illegal immigrants," threatening to call ICE, and saying he would follow her.

The driver said she initially apologized and did not provoke the confrontation. Video of the encounter was later shared by Tizzyent on Instagram, where it went viral and drew widespread criticism.

== See also ==
- Becton, Dickinson and Company headquarters
- List of biotech and pharmaceutical companies in the New York metropolitan area
