= Becton, Dickinson and Company headquarters =

Becton, Dickinson and Company Corporate Headquarters
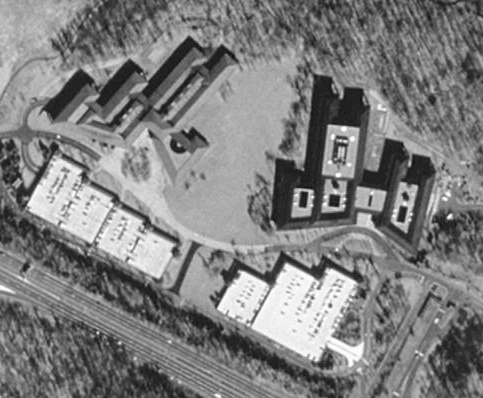
- Becton, Dickinson divisional headquarters (left), corporate headquarters (right), parking garages (below)
- Interactive map of the Becton, Dickinson and Company Corporate Headquarters area

General information
- Type: Corporate headquarters
- Architectural style: Tuscan Villa
- Location: 1 Becton Drive, Franklin Lakes, NJ 07417-1815
- Coordinates: 41.01570°N 74.20911°W
- Completed: 1986, 1992
- Inaugurated: 1988
- Owner: Becton Dickinson

Technical details
- Floor count: 3
- Floor area: 800,000 sq ft (74,000 m^{2})

Design and construction
- Architecture firm: Kallmann, McKinnell & Wood

The Becton, Dickinson and Company Corporate Headquarters is a corporate campus in Franklin Lakes, New Jersey. Built between 1986 and 1992, the buildings serve as the corporate and divisional headquarters of the Becton, Dickinson (BD) medical technology company. Designed by the architecture firm Kallmann McKinnell & Wood, the complex has won numerous awards for its unique modern design.

== Structure ==
Located alongside Route 208, the campus consists of four buildings, the corporate headquarters constructed during phase one, the divisional headquarters including research laboratories constructed during phase two, and two partially concealed parking garages which contain 1,500 parking spaces for the company's employees. In planning the building, Becton indicated that it wanted a campus in the style of a country house and not in the dominant institutional style of other suburban office buildings of the era. The architects of Kallmann McKinnell & Wood designed the buildings around several atria with office space radiating to the sides of the finger-like structures to meet this goal. The parking garages were designed to blend into the surrounding area while still being visible, a technique inspired from Palladio.

The corporate headquarters building is three stories tall and consists primarily of offices and communal meeting areas. It totals 350,000 sq ft (33,000 m^{2}). The first floor exterior is done in stone with windows in the shape of french doors. The second floor uses the same stone exterior with square windows in limestone settings. The third floor is faced entirely in glass divided into squares with metal mullions.

The divisional headquarters building is laid out in the same style with three finger-like wings connected by a traverse concourse. It totals 450,000 sq ft (42,000 m^{2}). Each wing contains an atrium that is surrounded by either laboratory facilities in the two longer wings or a cafeteria and classrooms in the shorter wing. The exterior is done using the same materials at the corporate headquarters building, namely a honey colored brick and granite base, the limestone on the second level, and a copper overhanging roof that provides shades to the lower levels.

The sculptures present throughout the buildings and the surrounding garden terraces were designed by Michael Singer as part of a comprehensive site plan that saw the large open spaces on the campus designed by Morgan Wheelock and the smaller connecting spaces laid out by Richard Fleischner.

== Awards ==
- 1998 AIA Honor Award for Architecture
- 1994 Boston Society of Architects Honor Award for Interior Architecture
- 1993 Boston Society of Architects Honor Award for Architecture
- 1991 BSA/Artist Collaboration Award
- 1990 AIA Honor Award for Architecture
- 1990 BSA Honor Award for Architecture
- 1989 Honor Award, NJ/American Society of Landscape Architects
- 1988 BSA Export Award, Highest Honor
- 1988 Excellence in Architecture Award, New England Regional Council
- 1986 Bridge Award, Steel Construction Prize, American Institute of Steel
