= Surgical sealant film =

Implantable medical device used during surgery

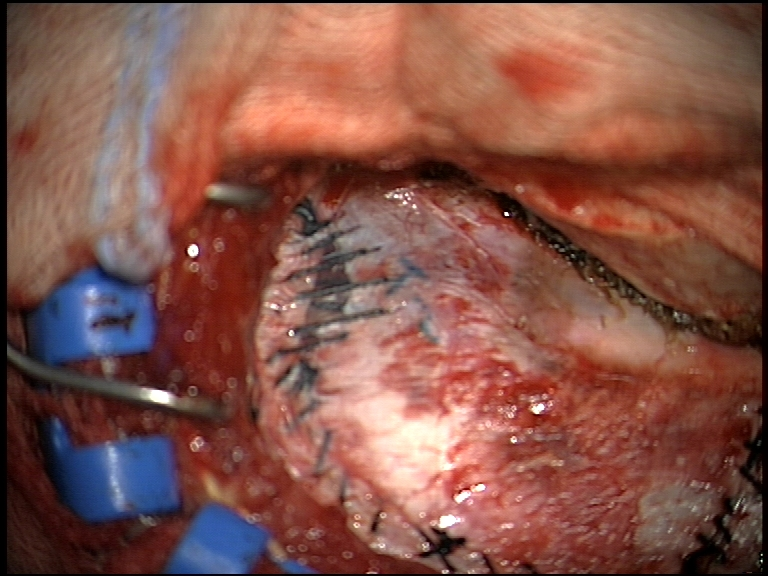
Use of a surgical sealant film to reinforce and seal gaps in the dura mater.

A surgical sealant film is an implantable medical device used during surgery. It is a preformed flexible patch that is applied to supplement sutures and surgical staples to seal tissues and prevent leaks of fluid (including blood and cerebrospinal fluid) and air.

The sealant film is synthetic and incorporates absorbable polymers, including poly(lactide-co-glycolide). The polymeric components impart structural and adhesive properties with the sealing effect achieved by incorporation of a bioadhesive polymer. This forms a covalent bond to primary amines present on the tissue surfaces. In turn this results in the film rapidly becoming effective in providing a form of secondary wound closure.

The film can be used for sealing the dura mater, preventing blood loss in general surgery and eliminating air leaks following lung resection.
