= Bard (company) =

Pharmaceutical company

C. R. Bard, Inc.
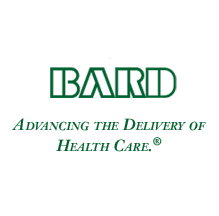
- Company type: Subsidiary
- Founded: 1907; 119 years ago
- Founder: Charles Russell Bard
- Headquarters: New Providence, New Jersey, U.S.
- Area served: Worldwide
- Key people: Timothy M. Ring (chairman) & (CEO)
- Products: Vascular, Urology, Oncology, and Surgical Specialties
- Revenue: ▲US$2.72B (FY 2010)
- Operating income: ▲US$730M (FY 2010)
- Net income: ▲US$509M (FY 2010)
- Total assets: ▲US$3.17B (FY 2010)
- Total equity: ▼US$1.63B (FY 2010)
- Number of employees: 14,000 (2015)
- Parent: Becton, Dickinson and Company

C. R. Bard, Inc., headquartered in Murray Hill, New Jersey, USA, was a developer, manufacturer, and marketer of medical technologies in the vascular medicine, urology, oncology, and surgical specialty fields. C. R. Bard marketed its products and services worldwide to hospitals, individual health care professionals, extended care facilities, and alternate site facilities. An S&P 500 company with approximately 14,000 employees in 2015, Bard is perhaps best known for having introduced the Foley catheter in 1934.

In April 2017, C. R. Bard announced that it would be acquired by Becton, Dickinson and Company (BD). The transaction was completed later that year, and the company became a wholly-owned subsidiary of BD, rebranded as Bard.

== History ==
C. R. Bard, Inc. was founded in New York City by Charles R. Bard in 1907. Bard's first business involved importing Gomenol, which was used to treat urinary discomfort. The company formally incorporated in 1923, and three years later, in 1926, Charles R. Bard sold the company to John F. Willits and Edson L. Outwin for $18,000. Under Willits and Outwins, the company expanded into the catheter business, introducing the Foley catheter in 1934 and the America Woven Catheter in 1940.

In 1948, C. R. Bard's annual sales topped $1 million for the first time, and the company moved its headquarters from New York City to Summit, New Jersey. In 1954, a Bard scientist, Dr. Michael DeBakey (1908–2008), developed the first arterial prosthesis. Three years later the company began selling Foley catheters that came in sterile packaging for the first time ever. Bard continued to innovate in the world of catheters, rolling out the bipolar temporary pacing catheter in 1958 and the first latex balloon catheter in 1960. In 1961, Bard expanded beyond catheters, and began manufacturing products related to cardiology, radiology, and anesthesiology.

C. R. Bard went public in 1963 and was listed on the New York Stock Exchange in 1968. Over time, the company introduced a variety of new health care products, and its net sales first exceeded $1 billion in 1994. Around 2012, Bard acquired the company Lutonix.

On April 23, 2017, it was announced that C. R. Bard would be bought by BD for $24 billion. On December 29, 2017, the acquisition was completed.

== Legal issues ==
=== Illegal kickback settlement ===
In 2006, a complaint was filed against C. R. Bard, alleging that the company paid illegal kickbacks to both physicians and consumers. In 2013, Bard agreed to pay $48.26 million to resolve the allegations relating to submitting false claims to Medicare.

=== Vaginal mesh devices ===
The transvaginal mesh is a device that is surgically implanted into the vagina to strengthen pelvic muscles or organs, or to treat incontinence.

By 2010, Bard and other makers of vaginal mesh were being sued by women who alleged that the devices were responsible for their medical pain and injuries. Their legal cases cited poor design and unsafe materials, and claimed that some patients required "multiple surgeries to remove" the device. In 2012, the U.S. Food and Drug Administration (FDA) required that Bard and other manufacturers study the rates of organ damage linked to the mesh devices.

Although Bard maintained that their vaginal mesh was "safe and effective", they began negotiations in 2013 to settle the nearly 30,000 legal claims. By August 2015, Bard had agreed to pay more than $200 million, thereby resolving about one-fifth of the outstanding lawsuits at that time.

=== Inferior vena cava (IVC) filters ===
An inferior vena cava filter (or "blood clot filter") is a device that is percutaneously implanted in the IVC. It is used to prevent deep-vein blood clots in the legs from moving into the heart or lungs (a condition that can be fatal).

Introduced in 2002, Bard's Recovery brand IVC filter was associated with 27 deaths and several hundred non-fatal problems. A "confidential study commissioned by Bard showed that the Recovery filter had higher rates of relative risk for death, filter fracture and movement than all of its competitors." Bard never recalled the Recovery filter, but instead developed G2 series filters to replace it.

On December 31, 2015, NBC News released their investigation of the G2 series filters. According to the NBC report, the G2 filter was just a modified version of the Recovery filter with "similar and potentially fatal flaws". Bard was reported to be aware of this shortly after the G2 was put on the market, but rather than recalling the filters, kept them on the market for five years. According to Bard and FDA records, at least 12 deaths and hundreds of problems had been linked to the G2 series filters.

In 2018, an Arizona court ordered Bard to pay $1.6 million to a plaintiff for injuries sustained from a G2 IVC filter implanted in 2007, plus an additional $2 million in punitive damages. Bard challenged the verdict, but in October 2020, a court of appeals refused to overturn the ruling.
