= Harvard Collection of Historical Scientific Instruments =

Museum collection at Harvard University

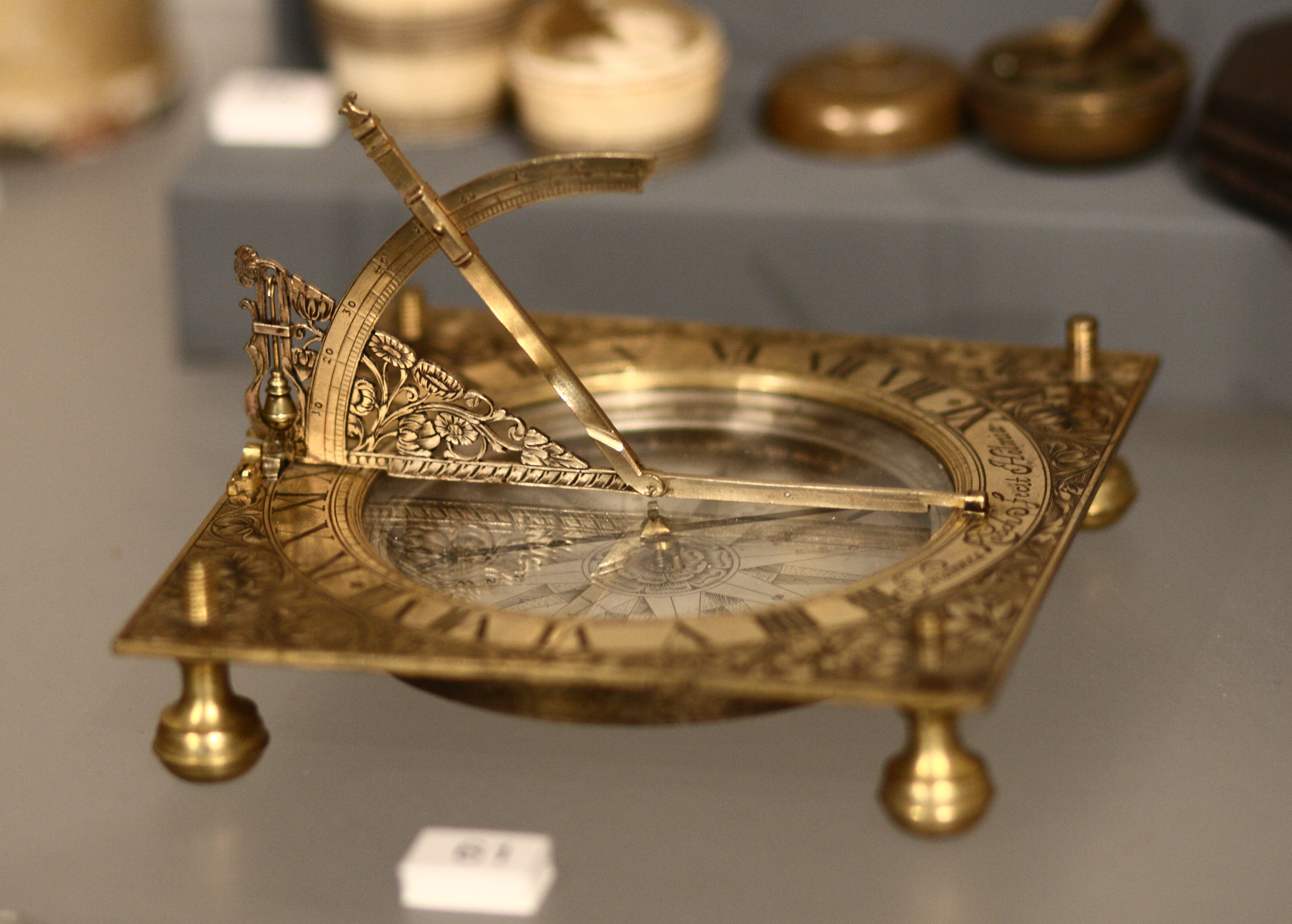
- A universal compass sundial from Stockholm c. 1650 – 1679, on display in the Putnam Gallery

- Location within Boston Location within Massachusetts Location within the United States
- Coordinates: 42.3765°N 71.1161°W
- Accreditation: AAM
- Collection size: 20,000
- Owner: Harvard University
- Public transit access: Harvard (MBTA Red Line)

Harvard University's Collection of Historical Scientific Instruments (CHSI), established 1948, is "one of the three largest university collections of its kind in the world". Waywiser, the online catalog of the collection, lists over 60% of the collection's 20,000 objects as of 2014. The collection was originally curated by Mr. David P Wheatland in his office to prevent obsolete equipment from being cannibalized for its component parts and materials.

== Physical facilities ==
A selection of instruments and artifacts from the collection comprise the exhibition Time, Life, & Matter: Science in Cambridge. This permanent display can be found in the Putnam Gallery on the first floor of the Harvard Science Center, which is free and open to the public during regularly scheduled hours, Sunday through Friday. In addition, rotating collaborative exhibitions drawn in part from the collection are shown in the Special Exhibitions Gallery on the second floor, as well as the more modest Foyer Gallery on the third floor.

The physical facilities in the Science Center were expanded in 2004, by replacing a one-story wing of the building with a four-story "townhouse"-style structure with offices, classrooms, and a fully-glazed internal stairway. The new wing houses the Department of the History of Science as well as public display spaces for CHSI. The modifications to the Science Center (originally by Josep Lluís Sert) were designed by Leers Weinzapfel Associates of Boston.

== Collection ==
The CHSI includes a number of scientific instruments and demonstration apparatus purchased circa 1765 under the advice of Benjamin Franklin, to replace original equipment which had been lost in a disastrous fire which also destroyed the university's library in the original Harvard Hall. This display includes apparatus for experimenting with electricity, as well as demonstrating the laws of physics as they were understood in the late 18th century.

Other highlights of the permanent exhibit include a fine assemblage of sundials (part of the largest private collection in North America), a geometrical compass designed by Galileo Galilei, and the control console from the former Harvard Cyclotron Laboratory.

One of the larger items in the collection is the Harvard Mark I, a historic room-sized electromechanical computer commissioned in 1944, which was exhibited next to the central stairwell in the main lobby of the Science Center, and has since been moved to the Harvard John A. Paulson School of Engineering and Applied Sciences.

== Governance ==
The collection continues to be expanded, under the guidance of David P. Wheatland Curator Sara J. Schechner. Originally a part of the Harvard Library system, the CHSI is now presented under the auspices of Harvard's Department of the History of Science, and is one of the four Harvard Museums of Science and Culture. The CHSI is also affiliated with the American Alliance of Museums.

A strategic plan has been developed to expand the CHSI's missions of preservation, education, research, and display, including expanded educational outreach and higher-profile public exhibitions.
