= Zimmer Hall =

Building in Cambridge, Massachusetts, US

Coordinates: 42.3764°N 71.1166°W

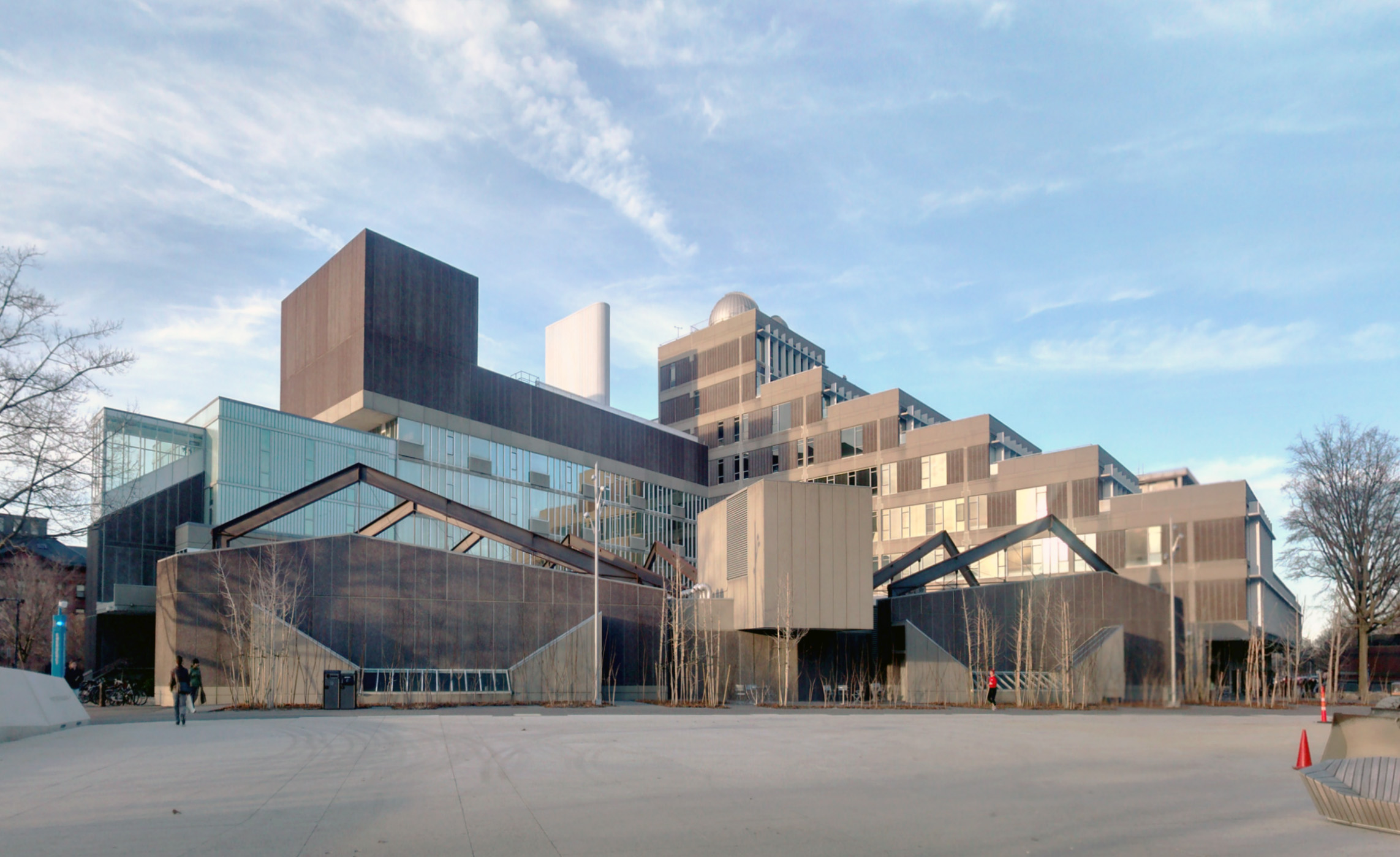
Harvard Science Center at Harvard University seen from the southwest with roof house astronomical optical telescopes visible

Zimmer Hall, formerly known as the Harvard University Science Center, is Harvard University's main classroom and laboratory building for undergraduate science and mathematics, in addition to housing numerous other facilities and services. Located just north of Harvard Yard, the Science Center was built in 1972 and opened in 1973 after a design by Josep Lluís Sert, who was then dean of the Harvard Graduate School of Design. Harvard announced in June 2026 that the building would be renamed Zimmer Hall in honor of a $100 million donation from the Zimmer Family Foundation.

== History ==
=== Planning ===
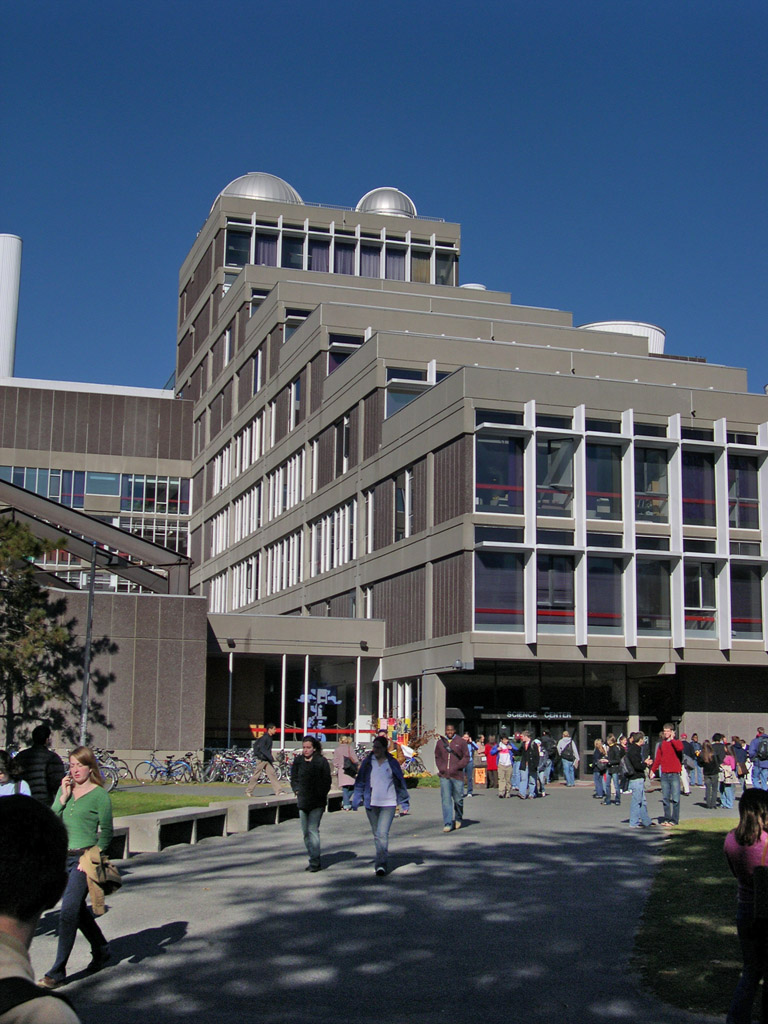
The building sits astride a major pedestrian passage between Harvard Yard and the northern parts of campus

Harvard had been interested in building an undergraduate science center in the 1950s and 1960s. However, in the midst of an economic decline, funding could not be found. No concrete plans were made until in 1968, Edwin Land, inventor of the Polaroid "Land" camera, made a $12.5 million donation to construct a science center specifically for undergraduates.

Opponents of the plan feared that funding would be insufficient to complete the project, and that the building's maintenance costs would be unreasonably high. The Biology Department also protested the move of its undergraduate-instruction facilities far from the department's main quarters. Professor George Wald argued that this would degrade the quality of instruction. There was also dissatisfaction with cancellation of plans at that time for a new biochemistry building.

The plan called for demolition of Lawrence Hall, a laboratory and a living space built in 1848. By the time of the scheduled demolition, a commune of students and "street people" calling themselves the "Free University" had taken residence in the unused building. The controversy was rendered moot when fire gutted the building a month later in May 1970.

As part of the project, in 1966–68 the portion of Cambridge Street running along the north edge of Harvard Yard was depressed into a 4-lane motor vehicle underpass, thus allowing unhindered pedestrian movement between the Yard and Harvard facilities to the north, including the new Science Center. Architectural historian Bainbridge Bunting wrote that this was the "most important improvement in Cambridge since the construction of [what would later be called] Memorial Drive in the 1890s".

=== Construction ===
Harvard commissioned architects Sert, Jackson and Associates to design and build the facility. Josep Lluis Sert, who had become Dean of the Harvard School of Design in 1953, had designed a number of other Harvard buildings, including Peabody Terrace, Holyoke Center (now the Smith Campus Center), and the Harvard Divinity School's Center for the Study of World Religions. These buildings were part of a modernist movement that sought to break away from the Georgian and related styles used at Harvard for hundreds of years. Thus, the Science Center is largely steel and concrete, with abundant natural light. Construction lasted from 1970 to 1972.

From 2001 to 2004 a $22 million, 32,000-square-foot (3,000 m^{2}) renovation created space for the Collection of Historical Scientific Instruments and expanded other facilities. A room-sized historic electromechanical computer built in 1944, the Harvard Mark I, was displayed on the ground floor next to the central stairwell in the main lobby of the building (it has since been moved to the Science and Engineering Complex (SEC) in Allston, Massachusetts).

== Facilities ==
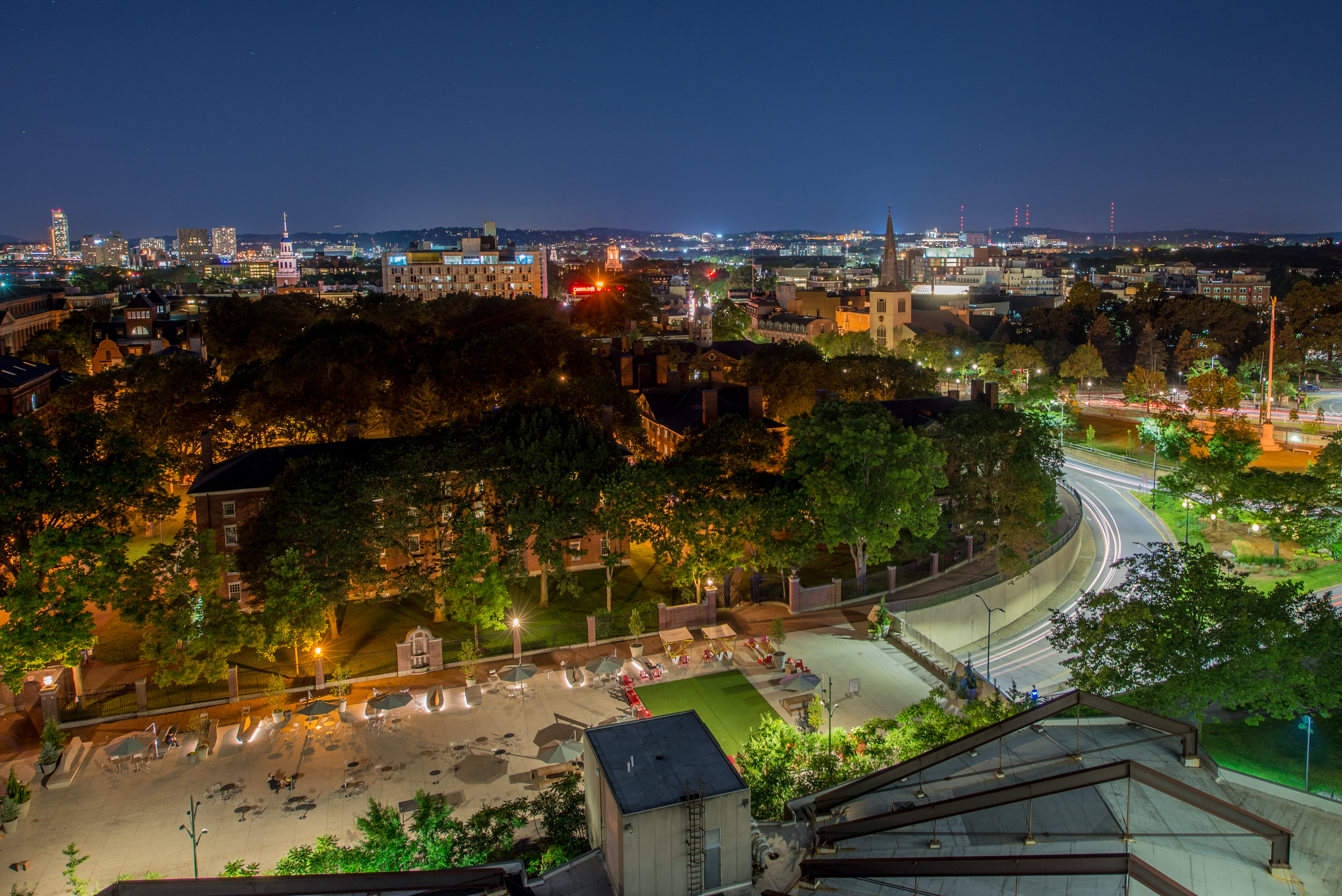
The Science Center's plaza (foreground) as seen from the Harvard Science Center overlooking Harvard Yard

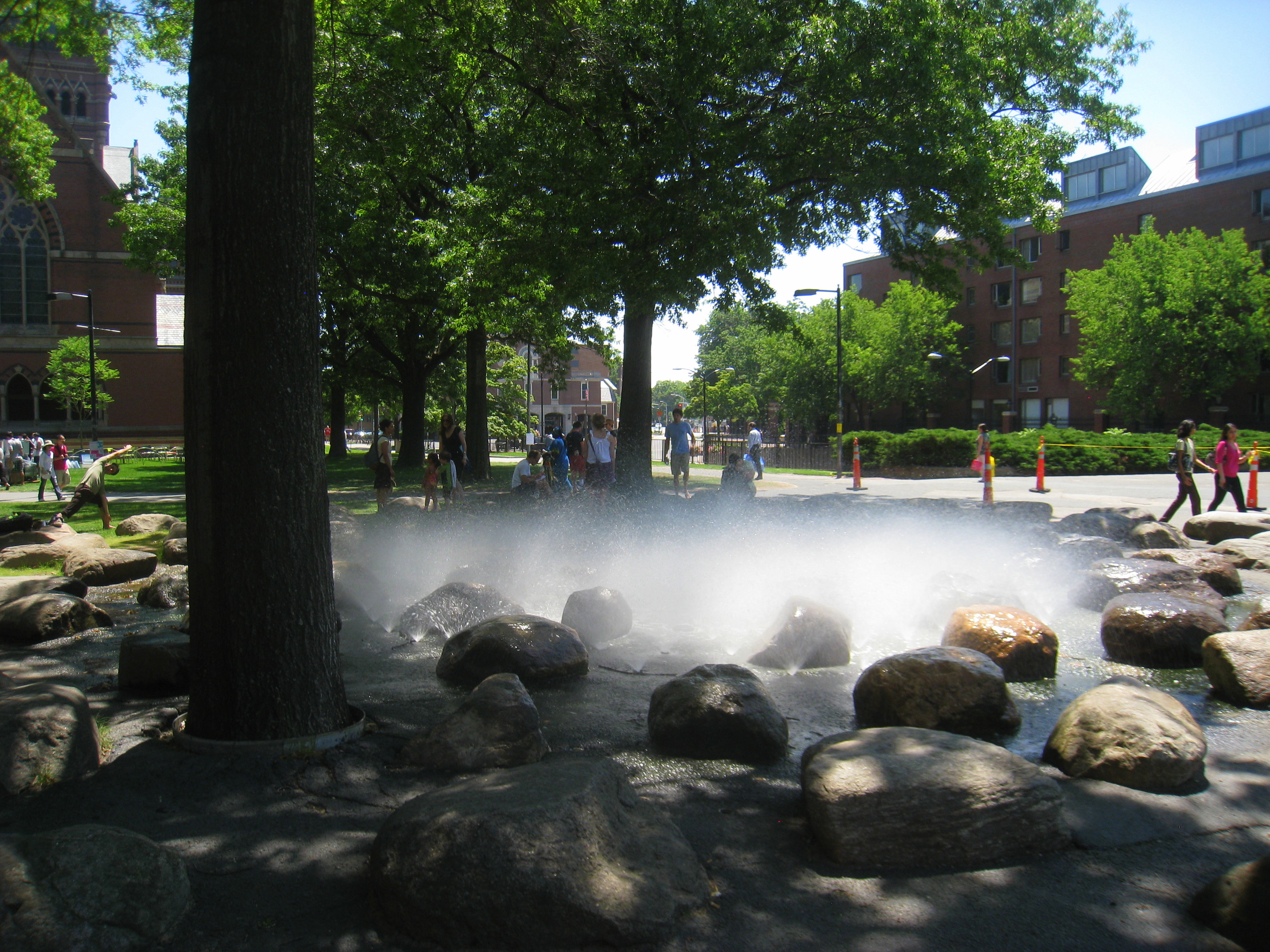
Tanner Fountain in front of the Science Center

The Science Center comprises nine stories, plus a basement and observatory floor. It houses the History of Science and the Mathematics Departments. Other facilities include:

- Cabot Science Library
- Collection of Historical Scientific Instruments (CHSI), housing the History of Science Department's 20,000 objects, dating back to 1400
- 5 large lecture halls, seating between 132 and 500
- 15 smaller general-use classrooms
- Teaching laboratories for chemistry, physics, biology, and other sciences
- Rooftop astronomical observatory with large optical telescopes
- Faculty and staff offices

Secreted beneath the Science Center itself and its courtyard (and largely unknown those who work and study at Harvard) is a "gargantuan" chilled water plant, "a magnificent Piranesi-like interior with the volume of Boston's Symphony Hall" providing cooling to many Harvard buildings from the Science Center northward. The building itself was first opened around the time of the 1973 oil crisis, and was plagued with huge energy costs, temperature control problems, and roof leaks for decades.

The plaza between the Science Center and Harvard Yard, created by the depression of Cambridge Street and Broadway into a large tunnel, is used at various times for food trucks, roller skating, ice skating, and other activities such as markets and concerts. Tents are erected for special events such as Commencement. The Tanner Fountain, a sculptural installation of large boulders and landscaping, operates during warm weather.

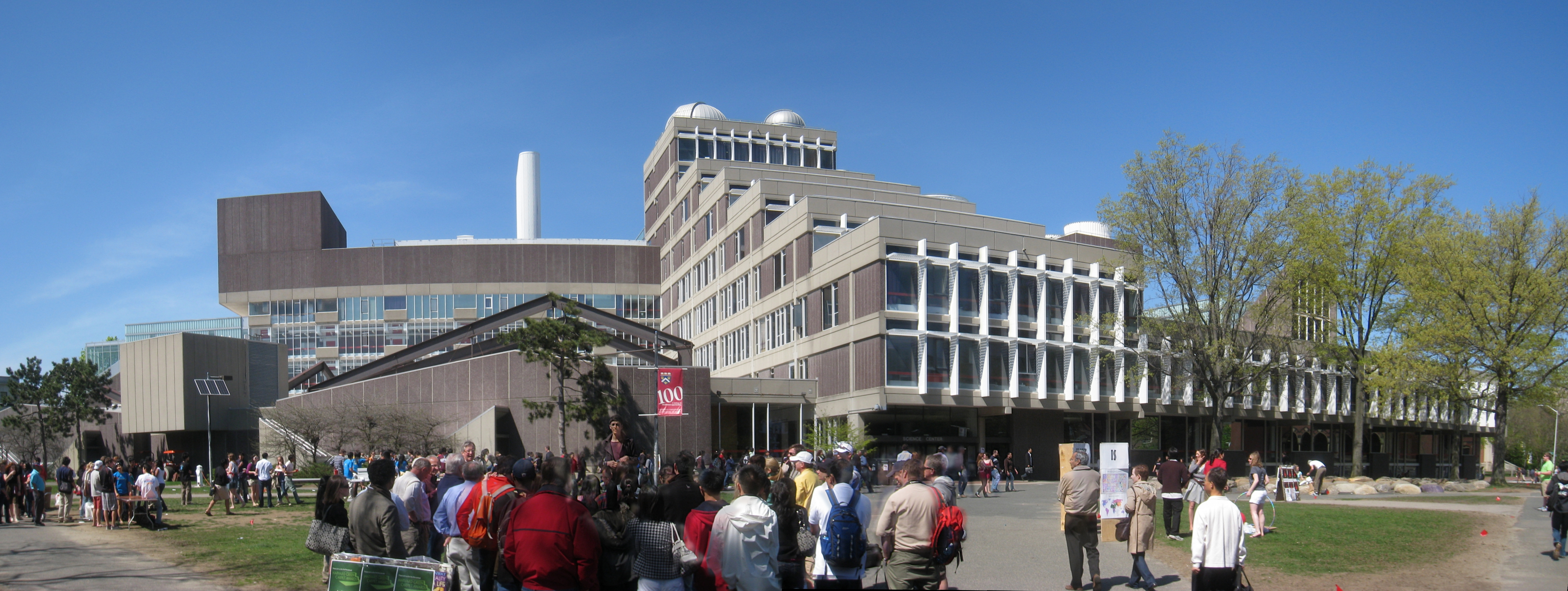
Panorama of Harvard Science Center, viewed from the plaza in front
