= CHSI =

CHSI may refer to:

- Comcast, an American multinational mass media company
- Harvard Collection of Historical Scientific Instruments, a collection at Harvard University
