= Harvard University Health Services =

Harvard University Health Services (HUHS) is an arm of Harvard University serving students, faculty, staff, retirees, and their dependents.

At the beginning of the spring semester 2015, HUHS began restructuring services, closing their Stillman Infirmary to focus on other services. The current central operation is in the Smith Campus Center (formerly Holyoke Center) in Harvard Square.

== Sources ==
- Harvard University Health Services – About
- Cromie, William (November 19, 1988). "UHS Celebrates A Century". Harvard Gazette.
