= Leers Weinzapfel Associates =

Leers Weinzapfel Associates Architects, Inc. is the first women-owned firm in history to win the American Institute of Architects Architecture Firm Award in 2007. Founded by Andrea Leers and Jane Weinzapfel in 1982, the work of Leers Weinzapfel Associates is known for its design innovation and excellence in the public realm.

== Projects ==
- The Paul S. Russell, MD Museum of Medical History and Innovation at Massachusetts General Hospital
- Expansion of the Harvard Science Center, Harvard University
- Harvard New College Theater/Farkas Hall (formerly Hasty Pudding Club)
- University of Pennsylvania Chiller Plant
- Zachs Hillel House, Trinity College, Hartford, Connecticut (2002)
- The John W. Olver Design Building at the University of Massachusetts Amherst in Amherst, Massachusetts (2017)
- Adohi Hall at the University of Arkansas in Fayetteville, Arkansas (2019)

== Bibliography ==
- Andrea Leers; Jane Weinzapfel; Joe Pryse; Josiah Stevenson (2011). Made to Measure: The Architecture of Leers Weinzapfel Associates. New Jersey: Princeton Architectural Press. ISBN 978-1568989570.
- Szenasy, Susan S. (8 August 2013). "Q&A: Andrea Leers and Jane Weinzapfel". Metropolis (architecture magazine). Archived from the original on 7 June 2015.
- "Women of Architecture: Andrea Leers, FAIA and Jane Weinzapfel, FAIA". National Building Museum. Archived from the original on 29 March 2015.
