= Casa Bloc =

Residential building in Barcelona, Spain

Coordinates: 41°26′29″N 2°11′26″E

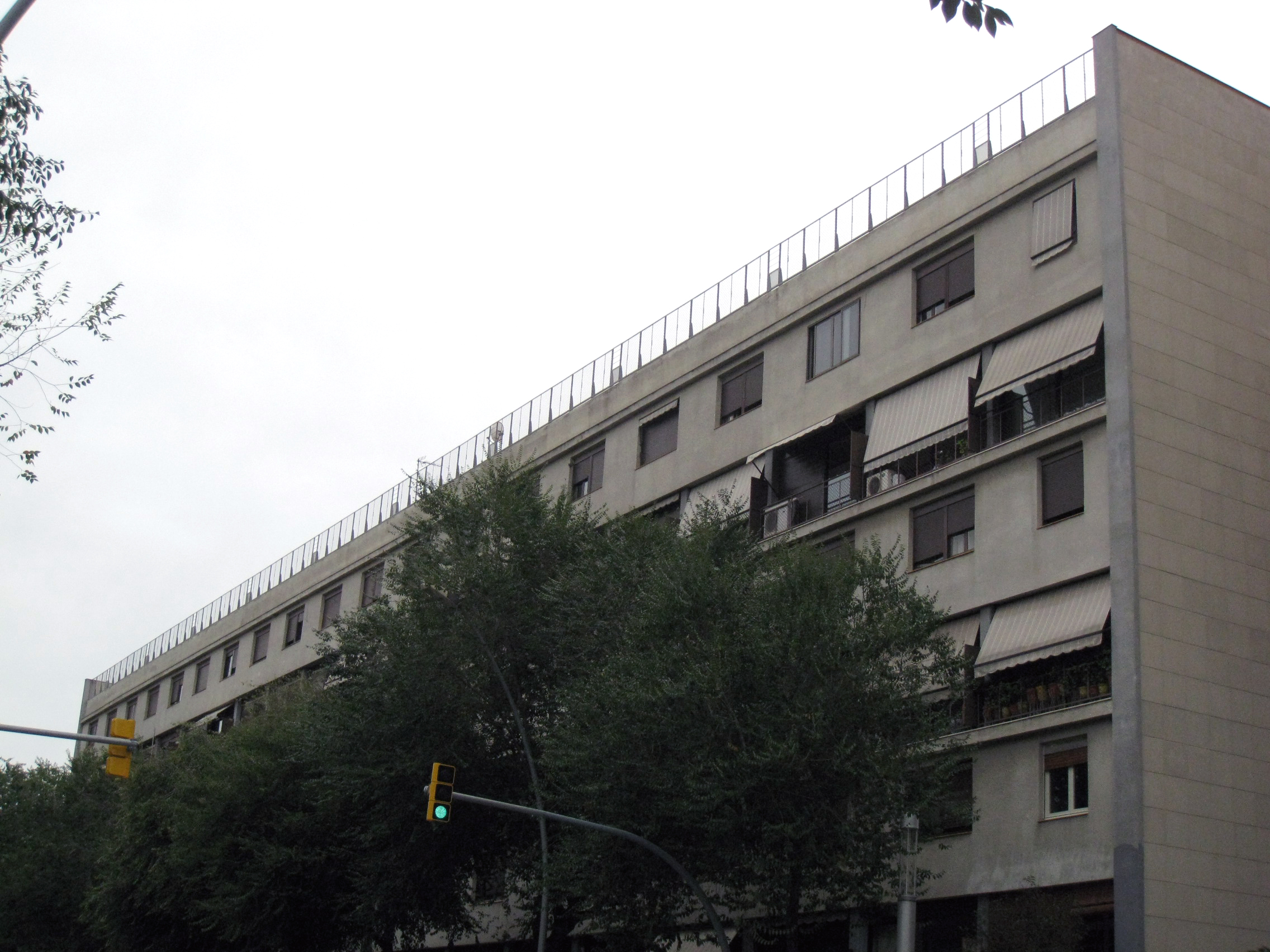
Casa Bloc

Casa Bloc is a residential building constructed between 1932 and 1936, located at 101 Passeig de Torras i Bages, in the Sant Andreu district of the city of Barcelona (Catalonia, Spain). Its architects were Josep Lluís Sert (1902–1983), Josep Torres Clavé (1906–1939) and Joan Baptista Subirana (1904–1978), all members of GATCPAC (Catalan Group of Architects and Technicians for the Progress of Contemporary Architecture). Catalan architects of the Second Republic, brought together by the GATCPAC, proposed a new way of living that was just, accommodated co-existence and defended the collective identity. The creation of Casa Bloc was one of the first steps towards dignifying workers' living conditions. As a result of the Spanish Civil War, the project was cut short. In 2012, after a careful restoration by the Institut Català del Sòl and Institut de Cultura of Barcelona through the Disseny Hub Barcelona, the doors to apartment number 1/11 are open and furnished just as its creators had originally wanted.

Today, the Casa Bloc is considered a symbol of the rationalist architecture in Barcelona promoted by the Catalan Government during the Second Spanish Republic, since it was once an innovative social project, integrated in the urban environment and housing functional accommodation designed as minimum standard for workers. In 1992, the Generalitat de Catalunya declared the building as a protected heritage in the category of Monuments.

== History ==
Between 1932 and 1933, the so-called Worker's Housing Group was built, a collection of small houses (casetes) commissioned by the Generalitat de Catalunya. During the construction of the Worker's Housing Group, the working hours of the construction workers and quantities of materials used to build the casetes were kept under exact control, so that the exact cost of the development could be calculated. The living area of each of these buildings was 35m² plus a small garden. In addition, in order to save money, an attempt was made to solve the problem of a low maximum occupancy of the buildings, which was solved by adding a second floor to each of the buildings. With regards to the success of this scheme, the Generalitat de Catalunya considered building a larger project, and the idea of the Casa Bloc arose.

Josep Lluís Sert (1902-1983), Joan Baptista Subirana (1904-1978), and Josep Torres Clavé (1906-1939) designed a large building with more than 200 apartments for workers in the industrial district of Sant Andreu, many of whom at that time still lived in shacks, generally in very poor conditions. The project was supported by the Casa Obrera, a body under the Government of Catalonia in charge of building housing for workers and improve the living conditions of the socially disadvantaged. The official laying of the first stone in 1933 was attended by the President of the Generalitat, Francesc Macià.

The Spanish Civil War prevented the completion of the Casa Bloc and the conclusion of the three-year conflict put an end to the philosophy that had underpinned its construction. The building was allocated not to workers but to the families, widows, and orphans of members of the Nationalist forces and, a little later, to the national police.

Structurally, the finished building was at odds with the aims of the GATCPAC architects: the communal spaces on the ground floor were completed in other ways, part of the original system of vertical access and corridors was discarded, and the primary purpose of the project and its social and cultural function was lost.

The GATCPAC members had sought to embody key elements of the group's thinking in the Casa Bloc, with a program designed to provide decent housing at low cost while suggesting new forms of social living and collective identity, formalized in a new urbanism based on a new concept of the city.

This creative freedom, closely aligned with the tenets of the European avant-garde of the time, and reflecting a significant social commitment, was swept away in Francoist Spain, and was not recognized and recovered until the restoration of democracy.

=== Change to Museum ===
The museumizing of Room 1/11 of the Casa Bloc recognises the building as an example of socially committed rationalist architecture in Catalonia. With the restoring of the apartment to its original structure and appearance and its opening to the public as a museumized space, Disseny Hub Barcelona added a new project as part of their mission to further our knowledge, understanding and appreciation of the design of objects and spaces.

For two years, INCASÒL and DHUB have worked together on this project, initially on the architectural rehabilitation and subsequently on the conceptual, documentary and museologicalaspects, in order to restore Room 1/11 to its original structure and appearance.

The museumization of the apartment has consisted in returning it to its initial state: the various elements added or altered during almost eighty years of use have been removed and the interior has been restored in its entirety. This has involved fitting out a period kitchen, bathroom, laundry area and shower, laying original cement tiles and replacing the folding doors in the dining room, all from other apartments in the Casa Bloc.

A number of other items, such as taps and light switches, have been expertly matched with corresponding original pieces from the 1930s. In addition, in order to make it easier to understand the living and circulation spaces, both the dining room and the bedrooms have been furnished in period style. The success of this project is due to the painstaking process of research and restoration and thanks to the active involvement of the residents of the Casa Bloc.

The Casa Bloc -Room 1/11 project is a joint initiative of the INCASÒL Catalan Land Institute of the Generalitat de Catalunya, the owners of the building, and Barcelona City Council's ICUB (Institute of Culture), by way of DHUB. The two institutions signed a collaboration agreement on 2 December 2009 for the realization of the Apartment-Museum.

== Apartment-House Museum 1/11 ==
The Apartment-House 1/11 of the Casa Bloc (1932–1939) is an apartment-museum run by Disseny Hub Barcelona. Inside you can visit the structure and the original look of the floor of this architectural complex, a reference to architectural ideas about worker housing at the time of the Second Spanish Republic. The opening of this museum floor space is a tribute to the work of Josep Lluís Sert, Josep Torres Clavé and Joan Baptista Subirana and the innovation that its approach embodied in the 1930s.

The Room 1/11 of the Casa Bloc is an apartment open to everyone, with a regime of guided tours by reservation, from March 2012. The housing 1/11 is a duplex measuring 60 square meters. It is located in Block 2, Level 1, Gate 11, the architecture of the Casa Bloc. The internal layout is very simple and clear difference of day and night.

Downstairs is the entrance, a hallway leading to the laundry with shower, kitchen, bathroom with toilet, dining room and terrace. Upstairs are two bedrooms (other homes in the Casa Bloc have three or four bedrooms, a variable that was expected to meet the needs of families). All rooms are exterior, with natural light and ventilation. The house also has openings on both sides of the block, allowing easy cross ventilation.
