= Cala d'en Serra =

Beach on Ibiza, Spain

Cala d’en Serra
- Beach
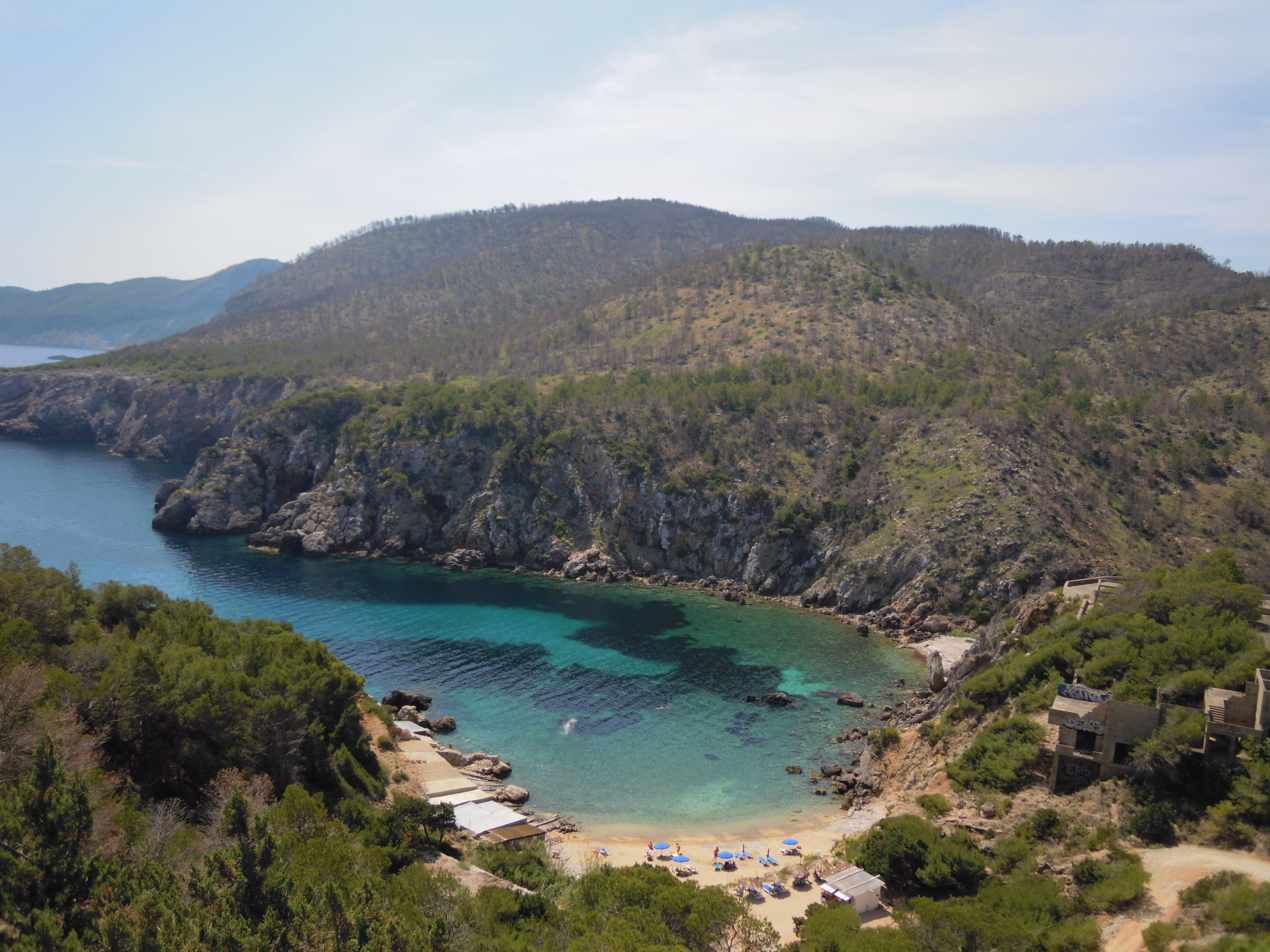
- The Bay of Cala d’en Serra

- Location within Ibiza
- Coordinates: 39°6′27″N 1°32′13″E
- Location: Sant Joan de Labritja, Ibiza, Spain

Cala d’en Serra is a beach in the northern part of the island of Ibiza. It is in the municipality of Sant Joan de Labritja and is 4.3 miles (6.9 km) north of the village of Sant Joan de Labritja, and 1.5 miles (2.4 km) east of the beach resort of Portinatx.

The beach of Cala d’en Serra is a small horseshoe bay with further satellite coves nearby. The sandy beach has clean clear water and was once named in The Guardian newspaper as.one of Europe’s best beaches. The bay is surrounded by steep cliffs.

== Abandoned hotel ==
This building project was started in 1969 by acclaimed Catalan Architect Josep Lluís Sert, who was exiled in the United States at the time, was planned to be a luxury hotel resort complex. Sert’s clerk of works, Antonio Ferran signed off on his projects back in Catalonia to get around the fact that Spain's fascist government ensured that Sert himself could not be accredited as an architect in the Catalonia & Balearic islands region. By the middle of the 1970s a lot of work had already been completed but project was put on hold, and then abandoned completely after Sert died of lung cancer in 1983.

In the years following Sert’s death there have been many proposals and heated debates over what should be done with the half finished project. Many islanders consider the half constructed hotel a blight on an area of outstanding natural beauty while others see the project as an important piece of cultural heritage, since Sert has now been elevated to one of Catalonia's most acclaimed architects. In the year 2000 plans were drawn up to complete the complex in the style intended by Sert, for use as an exclusive tourist attraction and Thalassotherapy centre. These plans were also eventually abandoned, mainly due to the 2008 financial crisis and the subsequent downturn in the island tourist economy.

== Gallery ==
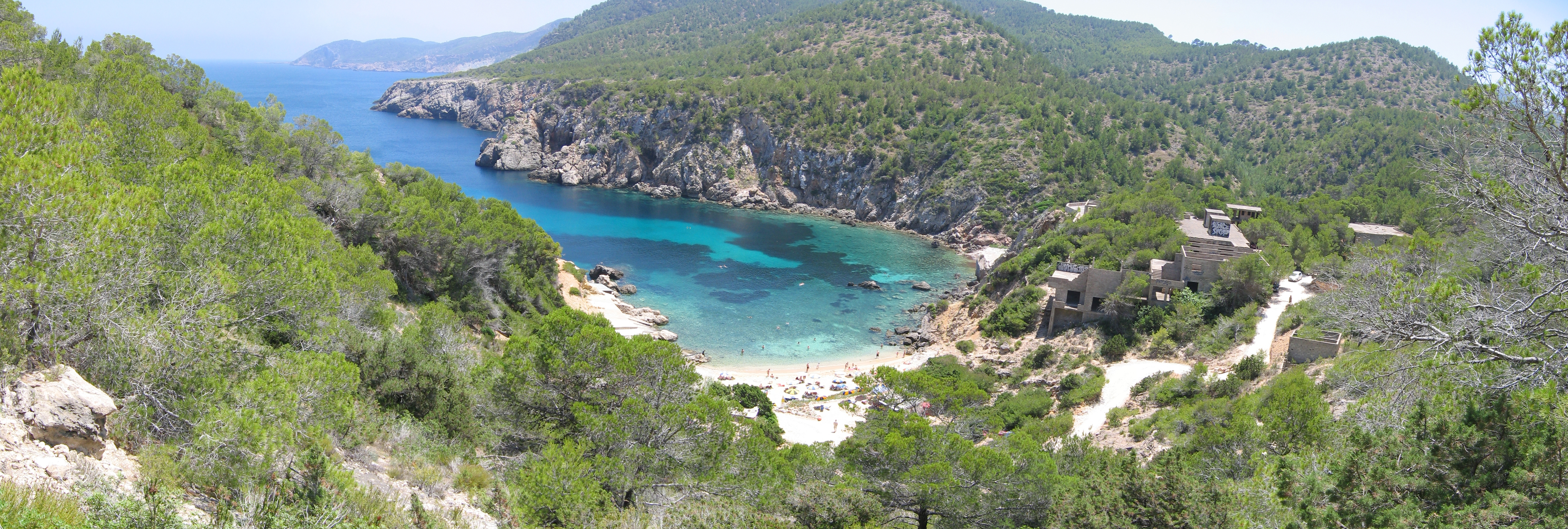

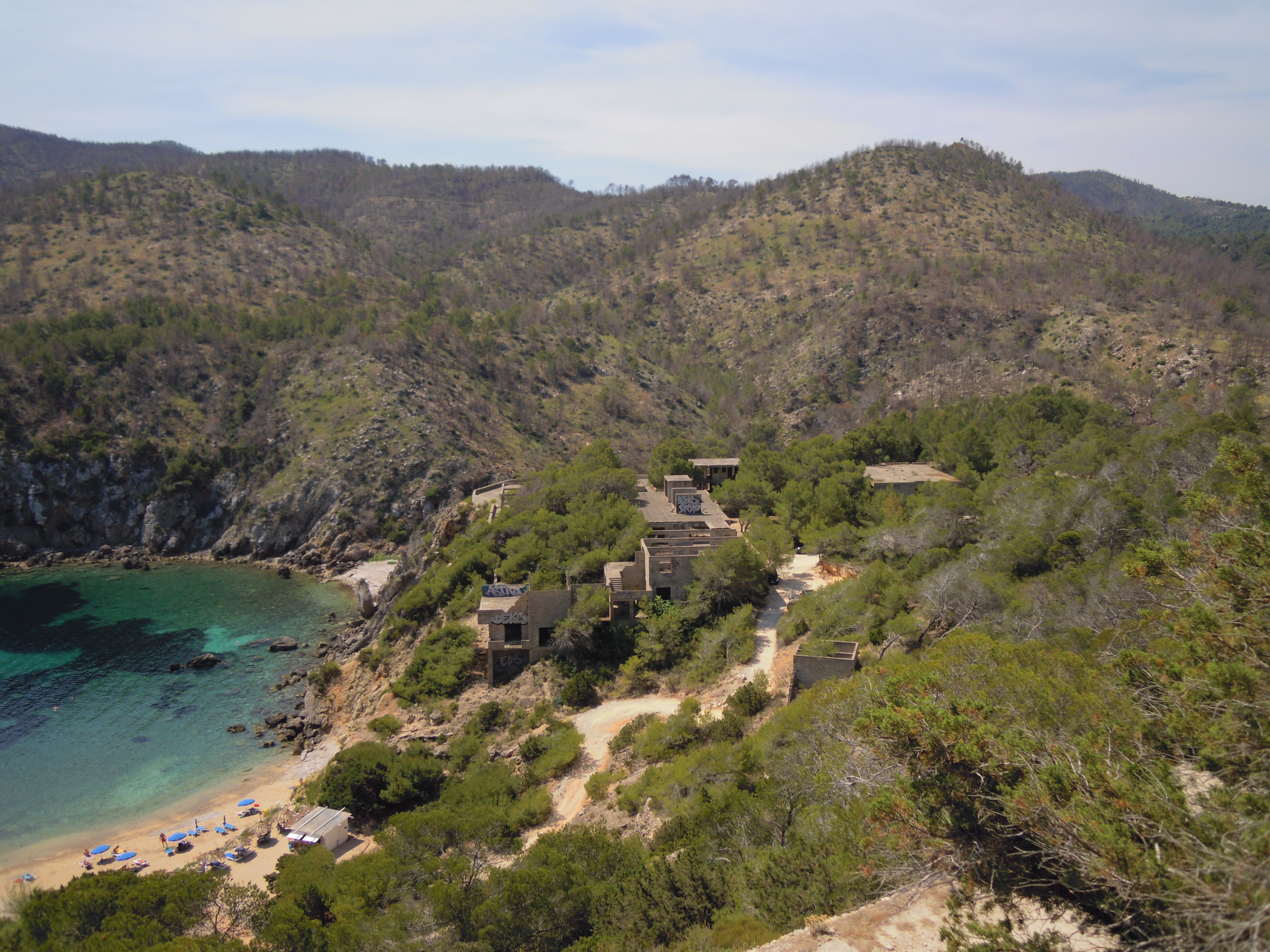

== See also ==
- Josep Lluís Sert, the architect of the abandoned Hotel
