= Cabot Science Library =

Library at Harvard University

Coordinates: 42.3761145°N 71.116359°W

Godfrey Lowell Cabot Science Library
- Established: 1973

Other information
- Website: https://library.harvard.edu/libraries/cabot

The Godfrey Lowell Cabot Science Library is a library at Harvard University. The library opened in 1973 as part of the Harvard Science Center and was named after Godfrey Lowell Cabot, a Harvard graduate and chemist.

The library was redesigned in 2016 and reopened in 2017, with more flexible spaces and updated media resources.
