= Andrea Leers =

American architect and educator

- Born: Miami, Florida
- Education: Wellesley College; The University of Pennsylvania
- Occupation: Architect
- Awards: Architecture Firm Award (2007)
- Projects: MIT Media Lab;

Andrea Leers is an American architect and educator. Together with Jane Weinzapfel, Leers created the Boston-based architecture firm Leers Weinzapfel Associates which was the first woman-owned firm to win the American Institute of Architects Architecture Firm Award in 2007. In 1991, she was elected to the American Institute of Architects College of Fellows.

Leers is former Director of the Master in Urban Design Program at the Harvard Graduate School of Design where she was Adjunct Professor of Architecture and Urban Design from 2001 to 2011. Her academic career includes teaching positions at Yale University's School of Architecture (1981-1988), the University of Pennsylvania Graduate School of Fine Arts (1990, 1998-1999), the Tokyo Institute of Technology (1991) and the University of Virginia School of Architecture (1995). In 1982 she spent a year in Japan as a NEA/ Japan U.S. Friendship Commission Design Arts Fellow. Leers was a Visiting Artist at the American Academy of Rome (1997), invited to be Chaire des Ameriques at the Sorbonne (Universite de Paris) (2007), and was Chair Professor at the National Chiao Tung University (2011-2014). In 2018, Leers was appointed to serve as Chair of Commission for the city of Boston.

== Early life and education ==
Leers was born in Miami, Florida and raised in Springfield and Longmeadow, Massachusetts. She holds an undergraduate degree in art history from Wellesley College and a Master of Architecture from the University of Pennsylvania Graduate School of Fine Arts during the tenure of Louis I. Kahn. After an apprenticeship period in Cambridge, Massachusetts, Leers founded a practice in 1970 with former husband Hugh Browning, and when they divorced in 1978 she led the firm until 1982. In 1982 she and Jane Weinzapfel established Leers Weinzapfel Associates in Boston, Massachusetts.

== Significant projects ==
- MIT Media Lab Expansion (in association with Fumihiko Maki Associates), Cambridge, Massachusetts
- Harvard University Science Center Expansion, Cambridge, Massachusetts
- Harvard University Farkas Hall (Formerly Hasty Pudding), Cambridge, Massachusetts
- United States Federal Courthouse, Orlando, Florida
- Blue Hill Avenue Youth Development Center, Boston, Massachusetts
- MBTA Operations Control Center, Boston, Massachusetts
- Tobin Bridge Administration Building, Boston, Massachusetts
- Franklin County Justice Center, Greenfield, Massachusetts
- University of Arkansas Adohi Hall, Fayetteville, Arkansas
- University of Pennsylvania Gateway Complex, Philadelphia, Pennsylvania
- John W. Olver Design Building, Amherst, Massachusetts
- Dudley Square Neighborhood Police Station, Boston, Massachusetts

== Significant lectures ==
- Jury Member International Competition: Paris-Saclay Student Housing, France (2015)
- "Making Connections" at University of Cyprus (2014)
- “Women of Architecture: Extended Territories: Leers Weinzapfel Associates” National Building Museum, with Jane Weinzapfel (2014)
- Keynote Speaker, “No Site in Sight: Making Architecture in the Urban Fabric,” 2010 International Design Conference, Shih-Chien University, Taipei, R.O.C. (2010)
- "Crossing Scales / Cultures / Disciplines: A Personal Reflection on 10 Years of Design Studios" at Harvard Graduate School of Design.
- AIA New York's "Cocktails & Conversations"

== Awards ==
- Boston Society of Architects Award of Honor (2009)
- Award of Excellence, BSA Women in Design Committee (2002)
- Architecture Firm Award (2007)
- Architect Top 50 (2014, 2015, 2016, 2017, 2018, 2019)
- Wall Street Journal Best Architecture of 2017
- AIA Architecture Firm Award (2007)
- AIA Honor Award (2001)
- AIA Honor Award for Interiors (1998)
- International Design Award, Institutional Category (2007)
- American Architecture Award (2001, 2008)
- World Architects Building of the Year (2017)
- Business Week/Architectural Record Award (2001)

== Bibliography ==
- Andrea Leers; Jane Weinzapfel; Joe Pryse; Josiah Stevenson (2011). Made to Measure: The Architecture of Leers Weinzapfel Associates. New Jersey: Princeton Architectural Press. ISBN 978-1-56898-957-0.
- Szenasy, Susan S. (8 August 2013). "Q&A: Andrea Leers and Jane Weinzapfel". Metropolis (architecture magazine). Archived from the original on 7 June 2015.
- "Women of Architecture: Extended Territories: Leers Weinzapfel Associates". National Building Museum. Archived from the original on 2 April 2015.
- Spyrou, Spyros (December 2, 2014). "Interview with Ms. Andrea Leers of Leers Weinzapfel Associates". Cy Arch.
- Leers, A. (2017). Collaborative spaces transform teaching, amplify learning, and maximize resources. Planning for Higher Education, 45(4), 15-21.
