= Harvard Hall =

Building at Harvard University

Coordinates: 42°22′29.5″N 71°7′5.5″W

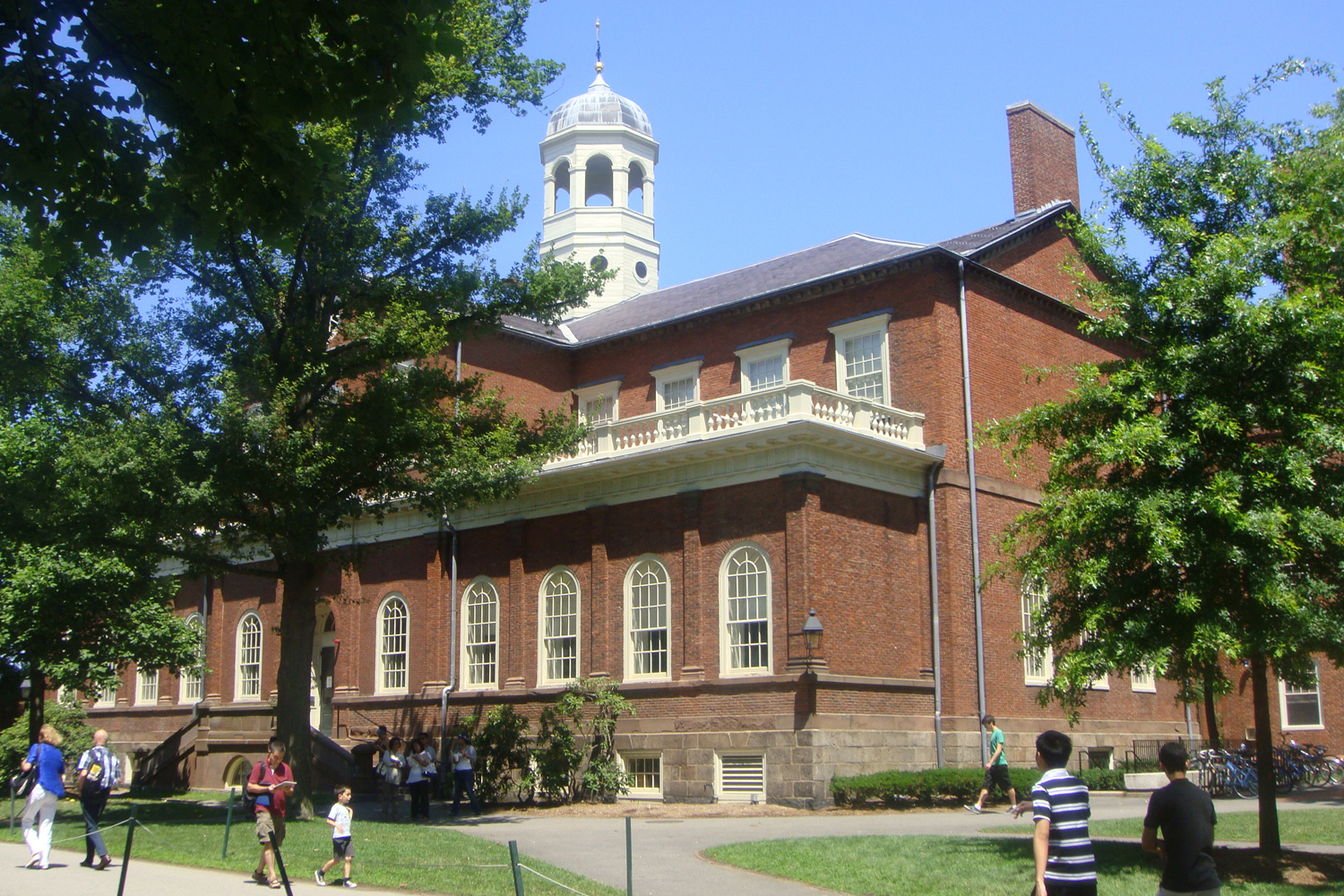
Harvard Hall

Harvard Hall is a Harvard University classroom building in Harvard Yard, Cambridge, Massachusetts.

== First Harvard Hall ==
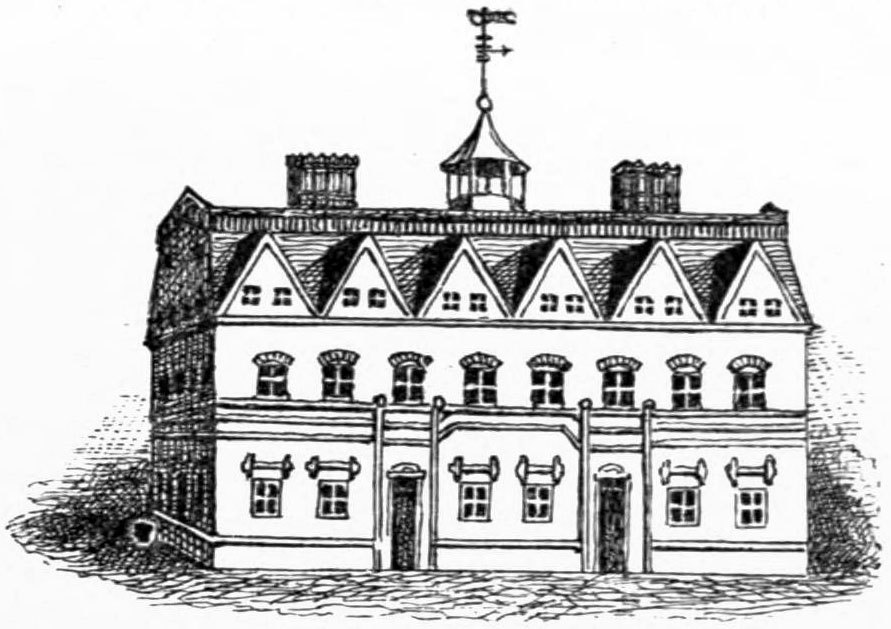
The original Harvard Hall, built in 1677, was destroyed by fire in 1764.

The present Harvard Hall replaces an earlier structure of the same name on the same site. The first Harvard Hall was built between 1674 and 1677. It was Harvard College's first brick building and replaced a decaying wooden building located a few hundred feet to the southeast. Samuel Andrew, a local Cambridge merchant and shipwright, was the master builder.

== Present Building ==
The original Harvard Hall burned on January 24, 1764, destroying 4,500 of the College Library's 5,000 books as well as its collection of "philosophical apparatus" (scientific instruments). The Massachusetts General Court, which had been meeting in Harvard Hall to escape a smallpox epidemic in Boston, took responsibility for the fire and funded reconstruction. Thanks to generous donors such as Thomas Hollis V and John Hancock, within two years the new Harvard Hall housed a library larger than that the college had before the fire. Thomas Dawes, who also built Hollis Hall at Harvard, was the master builder.

Under the specific advice of Benjamin Franklin, a new collection of scientific instruments and electrical demonstration equipment was acquired, mostly in London, to replace the apparatus that had been lost in the fire. The collection he assembled would later become part of the Harvard Collection of Historical Scientific Instruments.
