= Jane Weinzapfel =

American educator and architect

- Education: University of Arizona
- Occupation: Architect
- Awards: Architecture Firm Award (2007)
- Practice: Leers Weinzapfel Associates

Jane Weinzapfel is an American educator and architect. Together with Andrea Leers, Weinzapfel created the Boston-based architecture firm Leers Weinzapfel Associates which was the first woman-owned firm to win the American Institute of Architects Architecture Firm Award in 2007. In 1994, she was elected to the American Institute of Architects College of Fellows.

Her academic career includes teaching positions at the Massachusetts Institute of Technology School of Architecture and Planning (1974–1976) and the University of Arizona College of Architecture, Landscape Architecture and Planning (1996, 1999). Weinzapfel was a Visiting Artist at the American Academy in Rome.

== Early life and education ==
Jane Hanson Weinzapfel was born in Minneapolis, Minnesota and raised in Tucson, Arizona. She holds a Bachelor of Architecture from the University of Arizona. She was an apprentice in Cambridge, Massachusetts with Earl Flansburgh, Weinzapfel worked with Wallace Floyd Ellenzweig Moore, Inc. where notable projects included the Multiple Mirror Telescope at Mt. Hopkins, AZ and the Alewife Multimodal MBTA Station, Cambridge, MA. In 1982 she and Andrea Leers established Leers Weinzapfel Associates in Boston, Massachusetts.

== Significant Projects ==
- The Ohio State University East Regional Chiller Plant, Columbus, OH
- Paul S. Russell, MD Museum of Medical History and Innovation at Massachusetts General Hospital, Boston, MA
- University of Pennsylvania Gateway Chiller Plant, Philadelphia, PA
- MIT School of Architecture, Cambridge, MA
- MBTA Operations Control Center, Boston, MA
- Grainger Observatory at Phillips Exeter Academy, Exeter, NH

== Significant Lectures ==
- "Women of Architecture: Extended Territories: Leers Weinzapfel Associates" National Building Museum & Beverly Willis Architecture Foundation with Andrea Leers (2014)
- "No Site in Sight: Recent Urban Projects" RIBA Oman Chapter and Muscat Municipality Public Lecture, Muscat, Oman (2012)
- "Design Excellence" Sponsored by Committee on Design, AIA National Convention, Washington, DC and public forum in Columbus, IN (2012)
- "Cityscapes" Richard N. Campen Lecture Series, Case Western Reserve University, Cleveland, OH (2007)

== Exhibitions ==
- Chicago Athenaeum Museum of Architecture, The European Centre for Architecture, Art, Design & Urban Studies & Metropolitan Arts Press "The City & The World", Istanbul, Turkey (2014-2015)
- Chicago Athenaeum Museum of Architecture, The European Centre for Architecture, Art, Design & Urban Studies & Metropolitan Arts Press, Athens, Greece (2012)
- World Architecture Festival, Singapore (2012)

== Awards ==
- Boston Society of Architects Award of Honor (2009)
- Award of Excellence, BSA Women in Design Committee (2000)

== Professional Service ==
- Boston Society of Architects, President (2006)
- Boston Architectural College, Overseer (2011-2015) & Board of Directors, Trustee (2006-2010)
- Boston By Foot, Board of Directors, Trustee (2006-2015) & Board of Directors, Chair (2008-2010)

== Bibliography ==
- Andrea Leers; Jane Weinzapfel; Joe Pryse; Josiah Stevenson (2011). Made to Measure: The Architecture of Leers Weinzapfel Associates. New Jersey: Princeton Architectural Press. ISBN 978-1-56898-957-0.
- "Made to Measure: The Architecture of Leers Weinzapfel Associates". ArchDaily. June 2011.
- Szenasy, Susan S. (8 August 2013). "Q&A: Andrea Leers and Jane Weinzapfel". Metropolis (architecture magazine). Archived from the original on 7 June 2015.
- "Women of Architecture: Extended Territories: Leers Weinzapfel Associates". National Building Museum. Archived from the original on 2 April 2015.
