= GATEPAC =

GATEPAC (Grupo de Artistas y Técnicos Españoles Para la Arquitectura Contemporánea) was a group of young forward-looking Spanish architects who assembled during the Second Spanish Republic. The group was formed in 1930 and consisted of three subgroups throughout the eastern, northern, and central parts of Spain. The eastern group was called GATCPAC (Grup d’Arquitectes i Tècnics Catalans per al Progrés de l’Arquitectura Contemporània) and was the main group that was the most prominent and influential of the three. This group also carried out multiple government contracts during the Second Spanish Republic. The ideals GATEPAC sought to incorporate and bring to Spain through architecture were rationalism, modernism, urban reform, efficiency, and overall, an improvement to the quality of life for ordinary people.

GATEPAC also published the magazine A.C., or Actividad Contemporánea, which remains an important document for the history of Modern Movement in Spain. The magazine ran for 25 volumes until the group dissolved many years later after its initial conception .

Most, but not all GATEPAC members fought on the Republican side during the Spanish Civil War. Some members died fighting in the war while others would go on into exile or disappear after the war. GATEPAC became taboo and reference to it was often censored until the 1950s, when their works were taken up by a new generation of Spanish modern architects.

== History ==
=== Formation: 1930 ===
In September of 1930 two prominent architecture / art exhibitions were held in Spain that featured many prominent works of multiple architects and artists. During these exhibitions many of the architects and artists met and came together, exchanging ideals, ideologies, and philosophies with one another. Eventually they decided to come together a month later on October 26th in Zaragoza Spain to form the network and group of architects known as GATEPAC. This group was a coalition of young forward-looking architects that followed the same ideologies of improving the quality of life for ordinary people and sought to promote modernism, rationalist architecture, and urban planning.The group also drew heavy inspiration from Le Corbusier, Bauhaus, and C.I.A.M, specifically their ideas on form following function and functionalism.

The key members of the group consisted of Josep Lluís Sert, Antoni Bonet Castellana, Josep Torres Clavé, José Manuel Aizpurúa, Fernando García Mercadal and Sixte Illescas. The group consisted of multiple students and practitioners across Spain. GATEPAC was split into three separate subgroups throughout Spain, one of which being the northern group in San Sebastian led by José Manuel Aizpúrua, the central group which was located in Madrid led by Fernando García Mercadal, and finally the eastern group located in Barcelona which was led by Josep Torres Clavé and Josep Lluís Sert. The eastern group of GATEPAC was known as GATCPAC, which is the same name as the other groups translated and adapted into the surrounding areas language. This group ended up being the most active and long lasting of the three groups throughout the years the organization was active. GATCPAC and GATEPAC itself was primarily driven by the minds of Josep Torres Clavé and Josep Lluís Sert who were also the groups most distinguished representatives.

=== Active period: 1931-1936 ===
Copy of GATEPAC's journal

From 1931 to 1936 GATEPAC was in its most prominent years with the group having many projects to work on. GATCPAC also charted and published a magazine during this time, it was known as A.C or Documentos de actividad contemporanea and it was published on January 1st, 1931, at the start of the new year. The magazine focused on the groups architectural and urban planning ideas and strategies, it also sought to highlight the interesting forms, ideas, and philosophies that GATCPAC, GATEPAC, and other groups had captured and created. The magazine also had multiple pieces of commentary found within its pages, it criticized the sterile teachings of Spanish architecture at the time that was found in schools, hospitals, and homes. These buildings made life more difficult and uncomfortable for the user and resident which went against what GATEPAC and its subgroups stood for, this in turn helped promote GATEPACS ideology and philosophy, and the magazine series itself helped push their ideas and ideologies out into the world.

Even though the group was in its most active and prominent years (having about 90 members overall in its peak), the northern and central subgroups of GATEPAC ended up dissolving and ceasing to function in 1933 due to a number of reasons. They had fewer active members in the group; they didn't have the financial support (a lot of their work was unpaid and voluntary) and strong institutional backing like the GATCPAC. These and other reasons lead to the dissolvement of the northern and central groups. However, GATCPAC grew to even greater heights and became even more prominent in the architecture scene in Spain during this time. At its peak GATCPAC had about 40-50 active members within its ranks during its peak years along with many new projects and ideas involved with the group during this time. GATCPAC became the face and identity of GATEPAC as a whole and was the most influential and important group out of all the subgroups, this is where the most popular and important projects associated with GATEPAC came from.

=== Disruption & Dissolvement: 1936-1939 ===
In the later 1930's GATEPAC began to face turmoil with the onset and outbreak of the Spanish Civil war. When the war began, collaboration on projects, production, and organization of A.C magazine halted due to the beginning of the war. The A.C magazine officially ended after 25 volumes as the group was unable to continue its production and work during the war.

Many of GATEPACS members decided to flee Spain while some stayed and fought for their republic and its ideals. Others decided to not partake in the war but not leave the country all together. In the end, the republic was toppled by the nationalists and the war was over. Josep Torres Clavé and José Manuel Aizpurúa were killed in combat while Josep Lluís Sert went into exile into the United States. From there he would go on to teach at Harvard Graduate School of Design. Antoni Bonet Castellana established himself in Buenos Aires, Argentina. Fernando García Mercada went into exile in Switzerland but eventually returned to Spain albeit restrained in his practice under the new government. Sixte IIIescas went into exile in France and was unable to return to the practice. The remaining members of GATEPAC were either killed, exiled, or arrested after the war had ended.

With the war over, and many of its members scattered or dead, GATEPAC dissolved due to the fact that the remaining members had no strong leaders to lead them left in the wake of the war. Because of what GATEPAC sought to do and the ideals it followed, the projects the group made, and the group itself was heavily suppressed and censored after the war because it did not line up with the new government's ideals and vision.

== Projects ==
=== Casa Bloc (1932-1936) ===
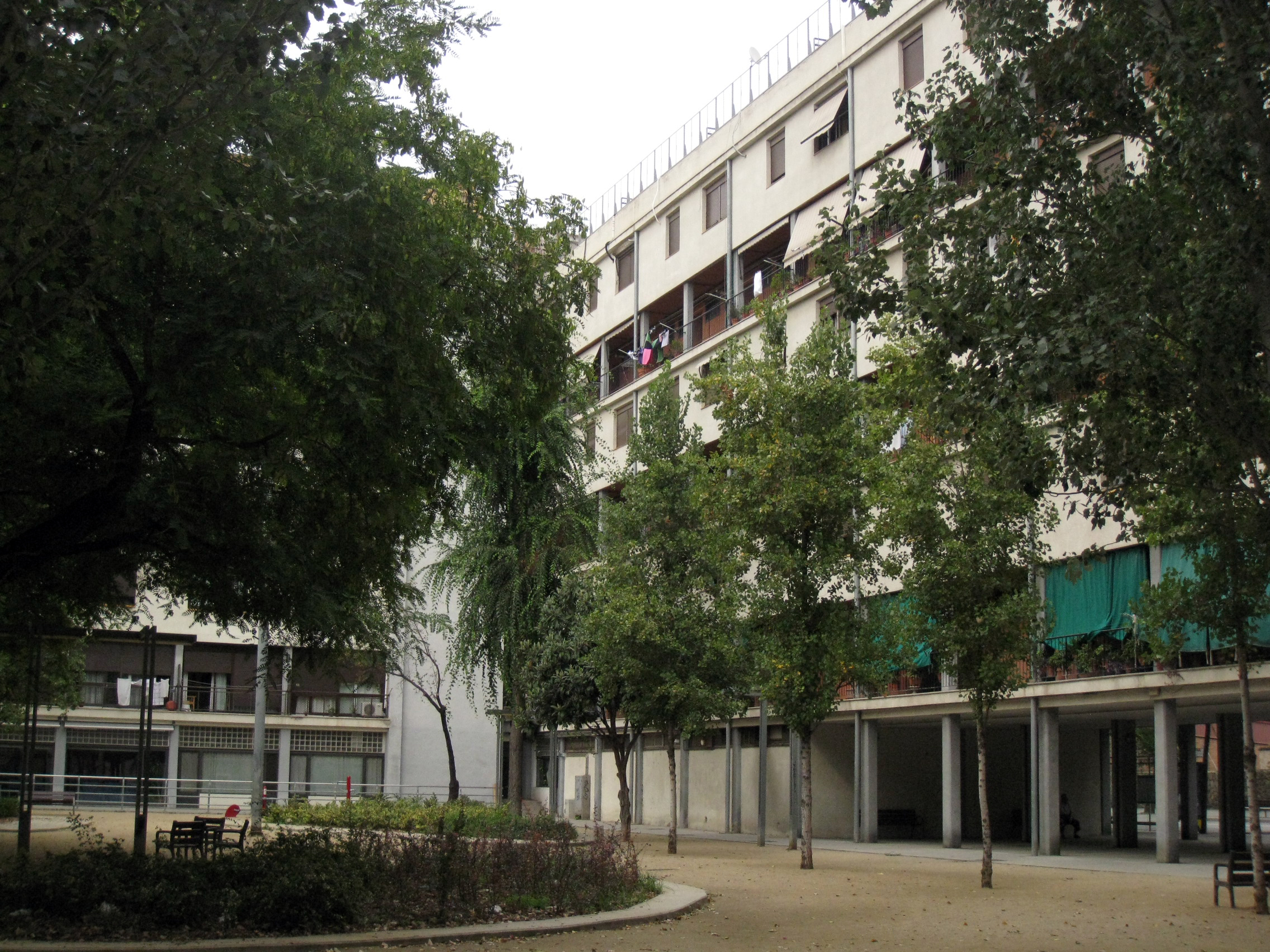
View of Casa Bloc from the ground floor courtyard.

Casa Bloc is a residential social housing project built with the intention of housing industrial workers and their families at a large scale in an urban environment. The project was designed by key figures and members of GATCPAC, those being Josep Lluís Sert, Josep Torres Clavé and Joan Baptista Subirana. The planning of the building began in 1932, and construction finished in 1936. The building is located in Barcelona Spain in the industrial district of Sant Andreu. However, the building would go on to never be inhabited during this time due to the outbreak of the Spanish Civil War. The project meant to house around 200 inhabitants and the living area of each of these buildings was 35m². The building was constructed out of a steel and concrete frame, and the interior portions of the building were fashioned out of wood and brick. It is also a re-creation of the Le Corbusier proposal for residential housing in urban areas that was made in 1922. After the war the building was not used to house workers and their families but was instead used by anyone that purchased a unit. Casa Bloc was noted to be one of the first steps towards dignifying workers living conditions, and in 1992 the Generalitat de Catalunya declared the building as a protected heritage in the category of Monuments. Casa Bloc was also classified as a member of the iconic houses (the international network connecting architecturally significant houses organization) and flat 1/11 was opened as a museum in 2012 with the furnishings and interior formatted to how the original architects intended.

=== Dispensario Central Antituberculoso (1934-1938) ===
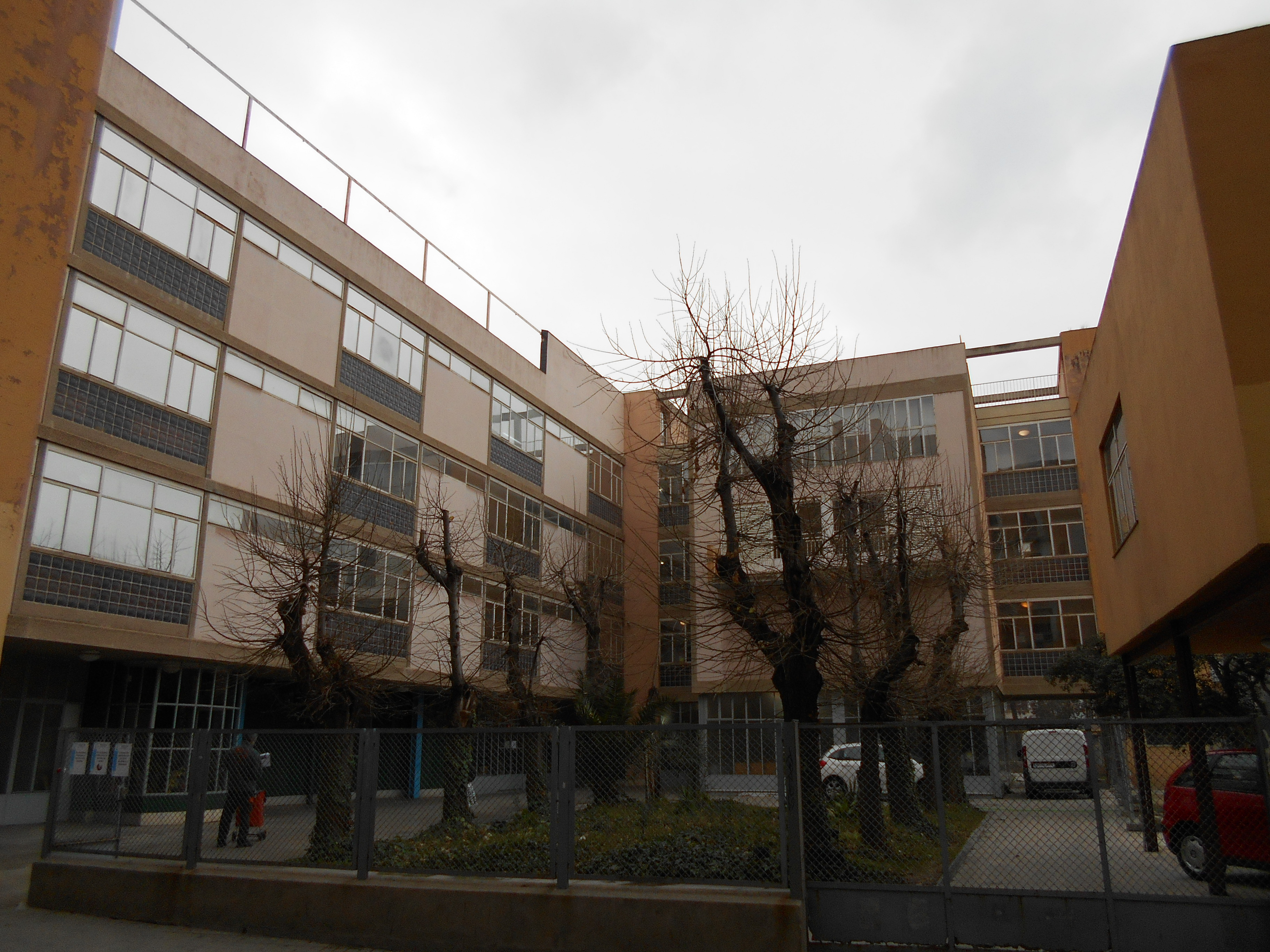
Exterior view of the Dispensario Central Antituberculoso building.

Dispensario Central Antituberculoso was a project that was designed as an anti-tuberculosis center that coordinated the fight against the disease across the country. Located in The Raval of Barcelona, the project was commissioned by the Department of Health and Social Assistance of the Generalitat de Catalunya. It was designed and planned in 1934 and construction finished in 1938 during the Spanish Civil War. The project was worked on by GATCPAC and was designed by Josep Lluís Sert, Josep Torres Clavé, Joan Baptista Subirana and other members of the group. The main goals of this project were for the building to fulfill the processes of screening, vaccination, epidemiological surveys, and the distribution of patients to different institutions. The building also needed to house the general archives. Open space was another quality this project sought to provide. The functional needs of this building were met by utilizing maximum ventilation and sunlit spaces all throughout the building. The clinic had three main sections with different purposes, the first being the caretakers' quarters which was separated from the rest of the building. The first wing housed dispensary core services, which were examinations and diagnoses on the ground floors while the upper floors held administration, archives, and a laboratory. The second wing had a smaller clinic for children on the ground floor while the floors above had a library and conference room. Both the first and second wing were connected and formed a L shaped building apart from the caretakers' quarters. All these sections were connected through the use of a courtyard-garden that acted as an entrance and a buffer for the surrounding urban context. The structure of each of these sections of the project were made from steel and concrete, using lightweight panels made out of numerous materials for the facade. The interior portions of the buildings feature brick walls, concrete structural walls, ceramic tiled surfaces, and painted and plastered walls. The windows of the building are held together by white painted metal frames and wood is primarily used for the furniture of the building. Since the building was finished during the war it was used as a clinic to treat injured soldiers and civilians during the battles and bombings of the city. After the war it was used as the anti-tuberculosis center that it was meant to be. Eventually, it stopped being used for tuberculosis treatment due to the introduction of tuberculosis antibiotics and changes in practices which led to it becoming a primary healthcare center. Nowadays this building is also recognized as a heritage architecture building due to its importance and history within Spain and its architectural design.

=== Pabellón de la República Española (1937) ===
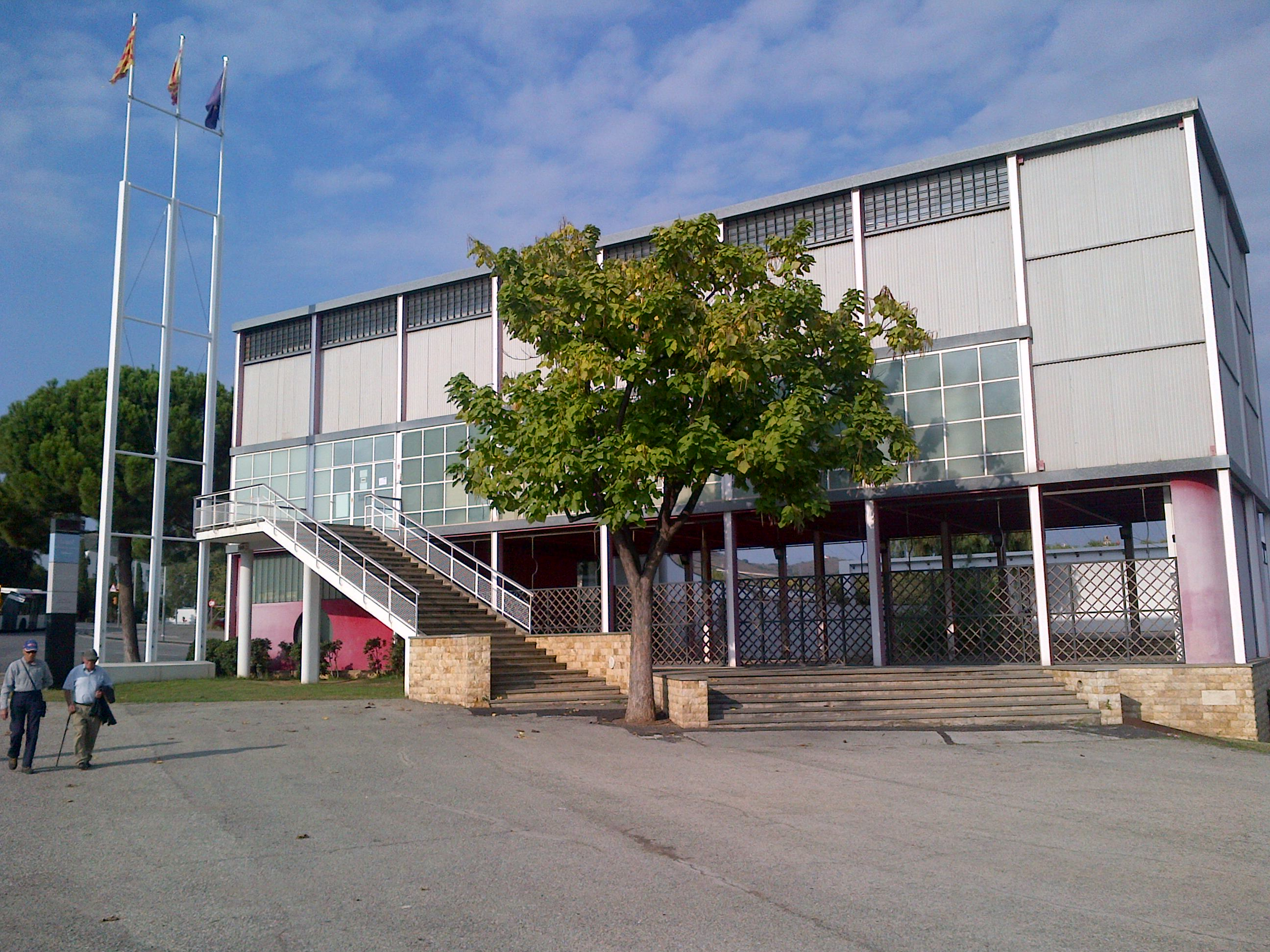
The Pabellón de la República Española 1992 re-creation, not featuring any artwork.

The Pabellón de la República Española is an art and cultural exhibition pavilion that was planned and built in 1937. It was located in Paris France and was featured in the Paris International Exposition. It was designed by GATCPAC member Josep Lluís Sert and Luis Lacasa and was used as anti-fascist republican propaganda during the Spanish civil war. The building itself wasn't made by GATEPAC or GATCPAC, but members of these groups closely worked with other individual architects to get the pavilion ready for the Paris International Exposition. The exterior facades of the pavilion depicted the avant-garde cultural movement of Spain at that time. Many varying works of art decorated the exterior facades of the pavilion turning it into an art piece itself. Multiple types of art were displayed inside the pavilion, these works of art included posters, paintings, drawings, photographs, and films. Some famous artists that had their work displayed in the pavilion included Joan Miro, Alexander Calder, Pablo Picasso, and many others. One of the most famous works within the pavilion at the time was Pablo Picassos Guernica, which depicted the state of Spain at the time, and the disaster of war which had just begun. Since the fair only lasted for a certain amount of time, the pavilion was not permanent and was quickly assembled with materials like wood, plaster, prefabricated panels, and a steel frame for the pavilion itself. At the end of the fair, the pavilion was taken down and soon after GATEPAC would cease operations because of the war. The Spanish Republic Pavillion was one of the last major projects GATEPAC members would work on and many historical drawings, photos, and records would be lost with the change and suppression of the new nationalist government that had won the war in 1939. Some of the documents were recovered years later but not all would be found.

In 1992 the Pavillion was recreated albeit with some things modified. It was created and located in Montjuïc, a hill in Barcelona, Spain. The new Pavillion was reassembled by historian Juan Miguel Hernández León and architects Miquel Espinet and Antoni Ubach using old documents of the pavilion that were recovered. Since this Pavillion was a permanent structure now rather than a temporary one, it was built as a building to be more long lasting and solid. It features a reinforced concrete structure with steel elements, brick walls, and modern glass on the building itself. The building does not feature the artwork that it had within and on it at the fair in 1937. The architects rather sought to capture the interior spaces and layout of the building to showcase its simple yet effective design that was present all those years ago.

=== Plan Macià (1932-1935) ===
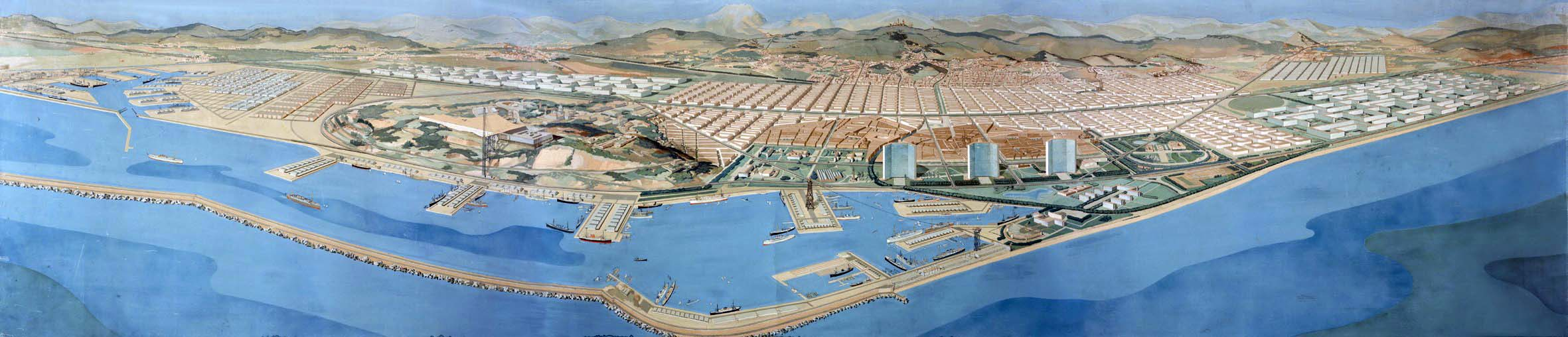
A drawing depicting what the Plan Macià would've looked like.

Plan Macià was the urban planning project that was designed for the city of Barcelona. The main figures and leaders of this project were members of GATCPAC, the most prominent being Josep Lluís Sert, Josep Torres Clavé, and they collaborated with Le Corbusier. The project was offered by the president of the Generalitat de Catalunya in 1932. This urban planning project was a revitalization and replanning of the city of Barcelona organized into five objectives, urban renewal, a new expansion strategy beyond the Cerdà grid, zoning at the metropolitan scale, the creation of a “city of leisure” at the edge of the sea: and reform of housing regulations. Controlled demolitions of areas were planned to make sure that historical zones and monuments weren't effected but also planned in a way to create new spaces for the people such as new community spaces, gardens, libraries, and spaces for children. The city was going to be expanding past the original grid that was set and new areas like business centers were planned for zones of work. The city would be connected through transportation such as trains, buses, and a new highway system. Along the coast many parks were planned to be put in place. The plan attempted to efficiently integrate the city's transport, industrial, residential, and leisure zones. They aimed to construct functional residences, factories, parks, and municipal buildings. The overall goal of this project was to make the city layout more livable and more efficient for the everyday people that inhabited it. Many of these buildings and spaces were planned to be provided with the proper cross ventilation and sunlight needed for the residents. However, due to the outbreak of the war, yet another GATEPAC project was put on hold and was never completed because of the war. This project would've sought to improve the living conditions of the working class and ordinary people. Although the design would never be put into place; its ideas and concepts would influence and inspire other urban planning projects within the city and would still continue to make an impact to this day.

== Legacy ==
Since GATEPAC was heavily censored and suppressed after the war, many of its work and discussion involving the group became taboo to talk about. In 1949 in an international meeting of architects a young man brought up the name of GATEPAC, and the work involved with the group. In response he was publicly reprimanded by a professor at the school of architecture where the international meeting had taken place.GATEPAC would be censored until 1975 when the government changed from a dictatorship to a democracy and topics and discussions relating to GATEPAC and their work were rediscovered and no longer suppressed and hidden, but rather celebrated and recognized as an important piece of Spanish architectural history

75 years after GATEPACS founding, a retrospective exhibition was held by C.O.A.M in Madrid in 2005 to commemorate and celebrate the work of GATEPAC. The exhibition included many projects, designs, and artwork created and related to the group as well as volumes of the A.C magazine. The exhibit was split up into four different time periods; the first period was in 1925-1930 which discussed the creation of the group. The second period was in 1931-1936 which showed the architects of the group and their work, impact, influence, and realization of their ideologies as well as the publication of the A.C magazine. The third period was in 1936-1939 and it focused on how the group dealt with and was affected by the war, and the final period was in 1939, and it examined the demise and collapse of the group due to the war. Overall, this exhibition showcased the most interesting and important projects to the group's history, and it was stated that nothing like this could be observed elsewhere in Spain at the time.

Even though GATEPAC had a short-lived history, its influence can be found all throughout Spain and the world today with many groups taking inspiration or carrying on their works, ideals, and ideologies in the modern day with their architectural designs and practices.
