= Peabody Terrace =

Housing complex at Harvard University

Coordinates: 42°21′58″N 71°6′56″W

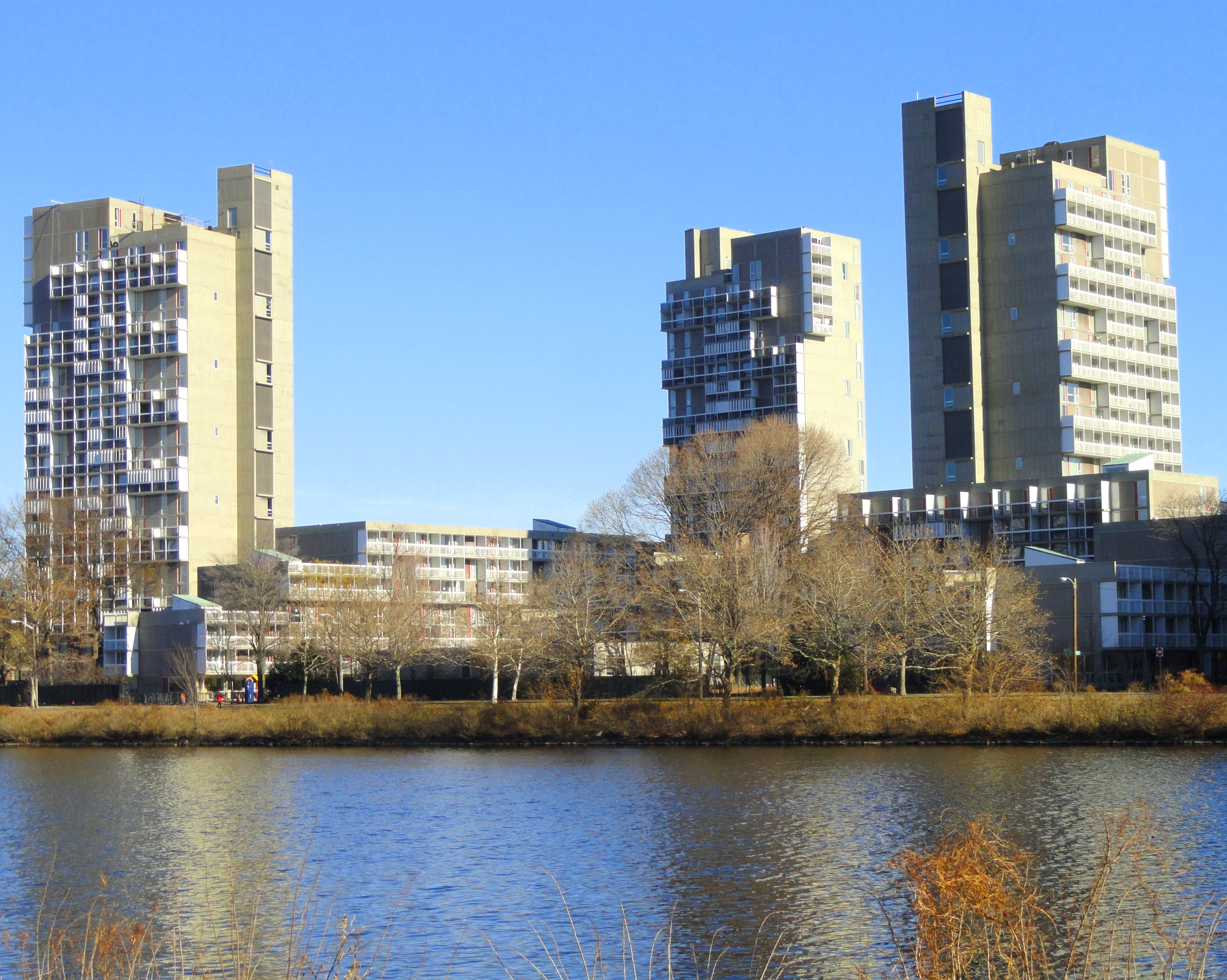
View from southwest across the Charles River in 2012

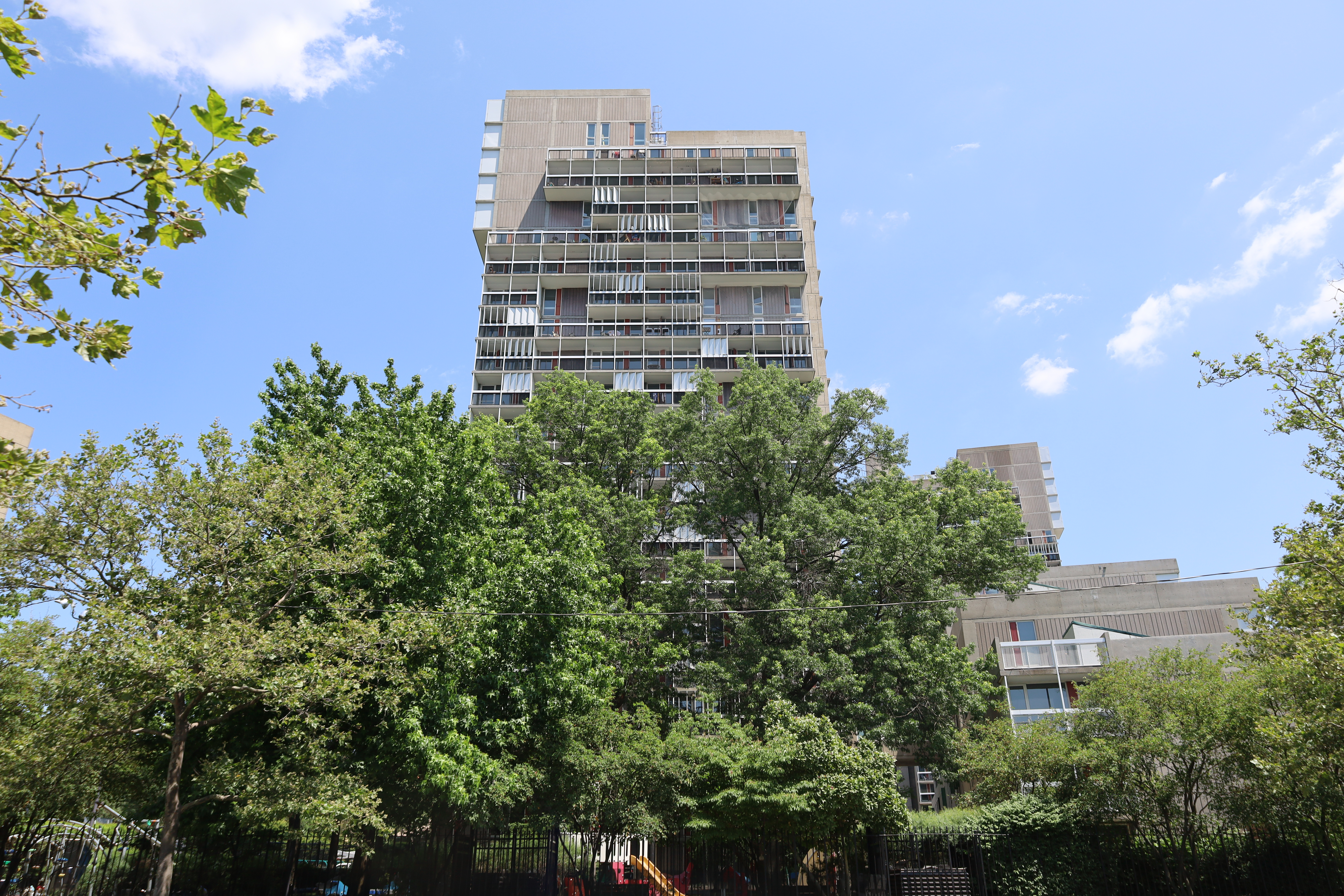
One of the buildings in 2023

Peabody Terrace, on the north bank of the Charles River in Cambridge, Massachusetts, is a Harvard University housing complex primarily serving graduate students, particularly married students and their families. Designed in the brutalist style and constructed in 1964, the complex includes perimeter buildings standing at three to seven stories, and three interior 22-story towers.

It has been described as "beloved by architects and disliked by almost everyone else."

== Description ==
Peabody Terrace was completed in 1965 at a cost of $8.5 million. On 5.9 acres (2.4 ha), the 650,000-square-foot (60,000 m^{2}) complex consists of about 500 apartments (a mixture of "efficiencies" and one-, two-, and three-bedroom units‍—‌all with 7-foot-6-inch (2.3 m) ceilings) plus playgrounds, nurseries, roof terraces, laundromats/laundry rooms, meetings/seminar rooms, study rooms, and a parking garage. In order to maximize usable floor space and speed vertical transportation, the towers' elevators stop on every third floor. The Harvard-affiliated Peabody Terrace Children's Center is housed on the complex grounds.

== Reception ==
In the words of architecture critic Robert Campbell, the exterior reflects the desire of its designer, Harvard Graduate School of Design Dean Josep Lluís Sert, to "bring the color and life of the Mediterranean to the white cubist architecture of northern Europe". It has also been called "an extension of Le Corbusier's communal prototype, the Unité d'Habitation".

Originally designated as housing for married students, the partially completed project appeared in a Harvard Crimson photo over the caption, "University Moves to Thwart Early Marriages", and the Crimson later called it "well on the way to being just as hideous" as another Sert-designed building, Harvard's new administrative high-rise Holyoke Center. Nonetheless it received the Boston Society of Architects' Harleston Parker Medal and the American Institute of Architects Gold Medal.

In 1965 Progressive Architecture said Sert had achieved "an efficiently workable interior arrangement, a lively sequence of exterior spaces, and a fluent continuity from low to high, and from old to new structures." But by 1994 the same publication saw Peabody Terrace as "an embarrassment to Harvard, and the last resort of graduate students who couldn’t find a better place to live." (The living units were renovated between 1993 and 1995 and the common areas overhauled in 2013.)
