= Josep Lluís Sert =

Architect and city planner (1902–1983)

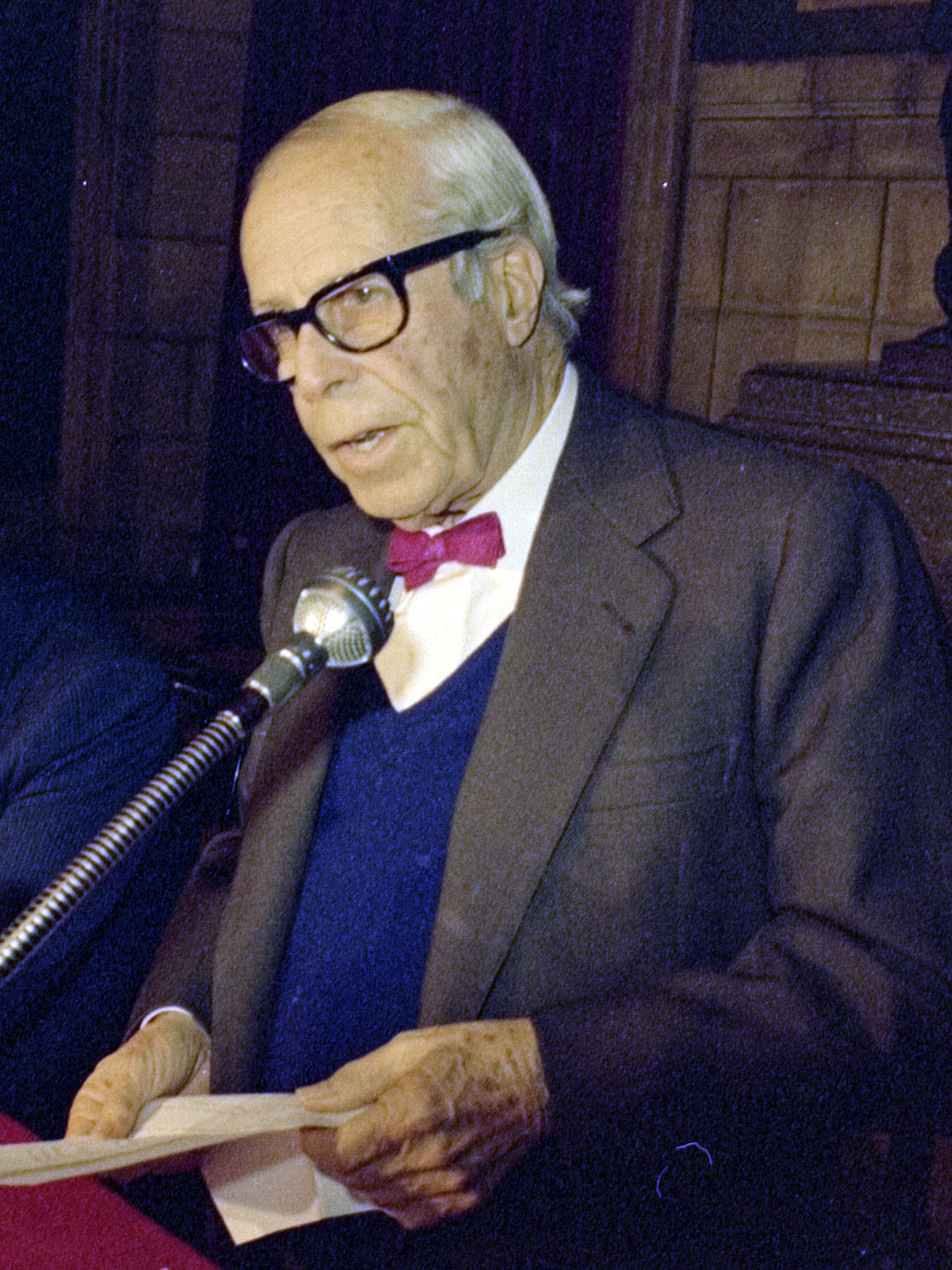
- Sert in 1981
- Born: Josep Lluís Sert i López; 1 July 1902; Barcelona, Spain
- Died: 15 March 1983 (aged 80); Barcelona, Spain
- Occupation: Architect

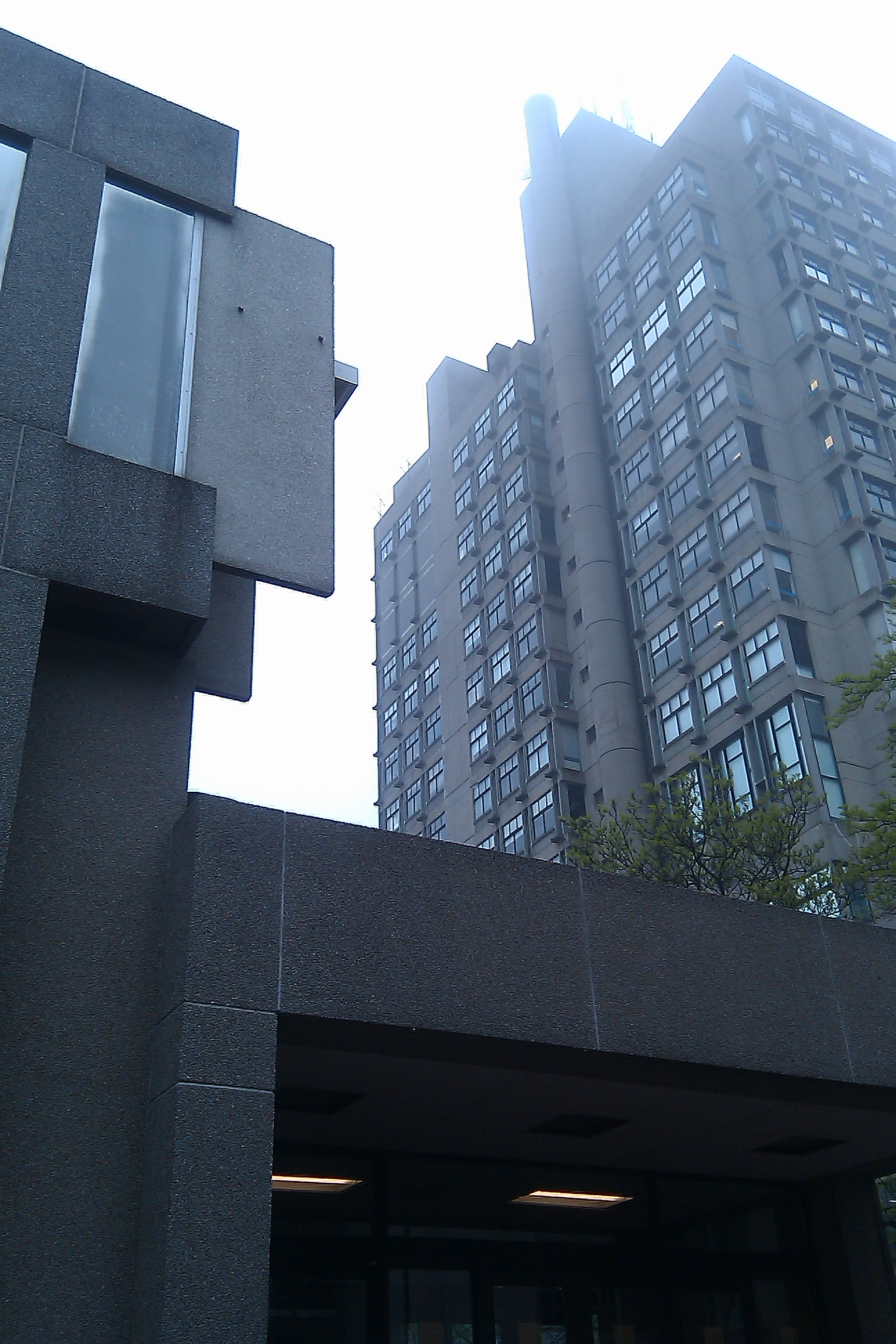
Boston University Library and Law Tower, Boston, Massachusetts

Josep Lluís Sert López (Catalan pronunciation: [ʒuˈzɛb ʎuˈis ˈsɛɾt]; 1 July 1902 – 15 March 1983) was a Catalan architect and city planner who lived and worked in the United States after 1939.

== Biography ==
Born in Barcelona, Catalonia, Spain, Sert showed keen interest in the works of his uncle, the painter Josep Maria Sert, and of Antoni Gaudí. He studied architecture at the Escola Superior d'Arquitectura in Barcelona and set up his own studio in 1929. That same year Sert moved to Paris, in response to an invitation from Le Corbusier to work for him (without payment). Returning to Barcelona in 1930, he continued his practice there until 1937. During the 1930s, Sert co-founded the group GATCPAC (Grup d'Artistes i Tècnics Catalans per al Progrés de l'Arquitectura Contemporània, i.e. Group of Catalan Artists and Technicians for the Progress of Contemporary Architecture), which later was the prominent association, with the addition of the western and north groups, of the GATEPAC (Grupo de Artistas y Técnicos Españoles para el Progreso de l'Arquitectura Contemporánea), which was in turn the Spanish branch of the Congrès International d'Architecture Moderne (CIAM). Sometime later, Sert became President of CIAM (1947–1956). He created several outstanding pieces of modern architecture during this period, such as the week-end house in El Garraf, Catalonia (1935), the Central Dispensary of Barcelona (1935) and the Master Plan for the City of Barcelona (1933–1935). From 1937 through 1939, Sert lived in Paris, where he designed the Spanish Republic's pavilion at the Paris Exposition of 1937. For the artistic content of the building, Sert called on his artist friends Pablo Picasso, Joan Miró, and Alexander Calder. Picasso's contribution was Guernica, which became the focal attraction of Sert's design.

=== Career in the United States ===
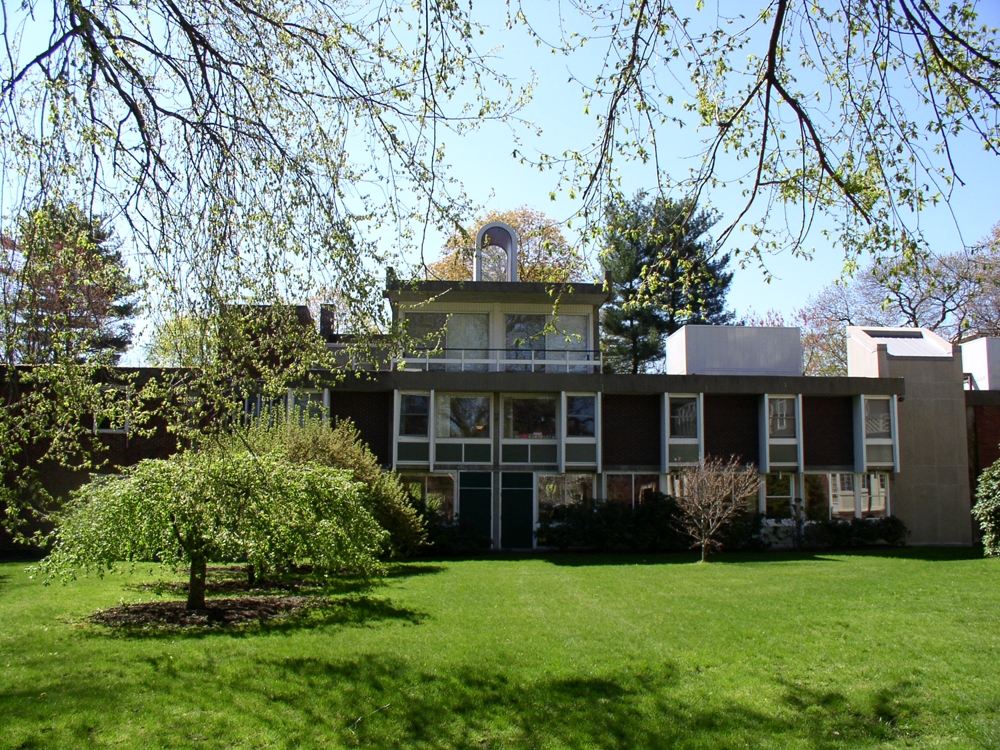
Rear view of the Center for the Study of World Religions at the Harvard Divinity School

After the fascist forces of Francisco Franco won the Spanish Civil War in 1939, Sert, like most members of GATCPAC, was disqualified from practicing as an architect in Spain, and went into exile in the United States, where he lived until Franco's death, when he returned to Barcelona. In his first years in New York City he worked with the Town Planning Associates, carrying out numerous urban plans for cities in South America.

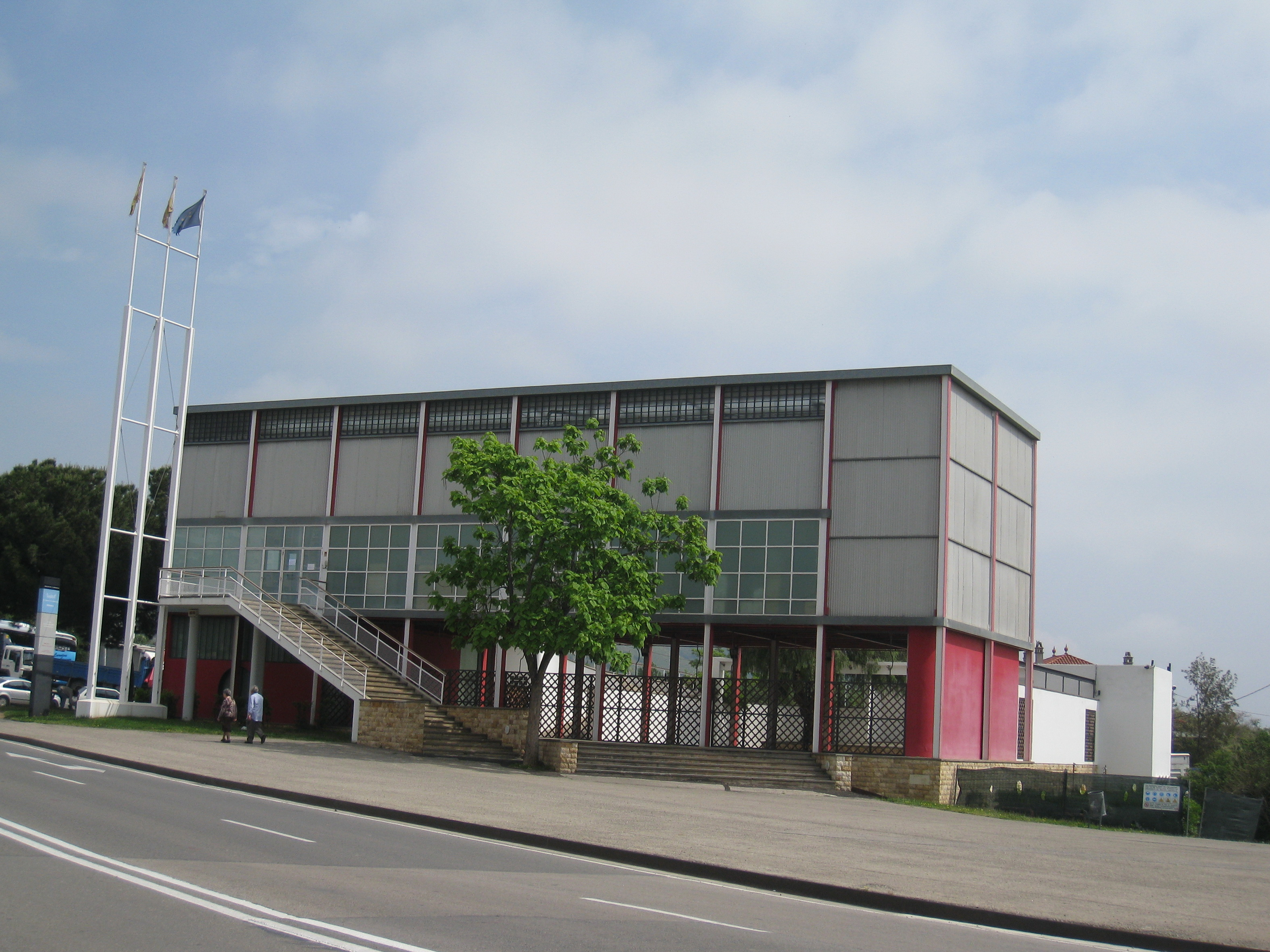
Pavilion of the Spanish Republic in París (1937). Reproduction of 1992 in Barcelona

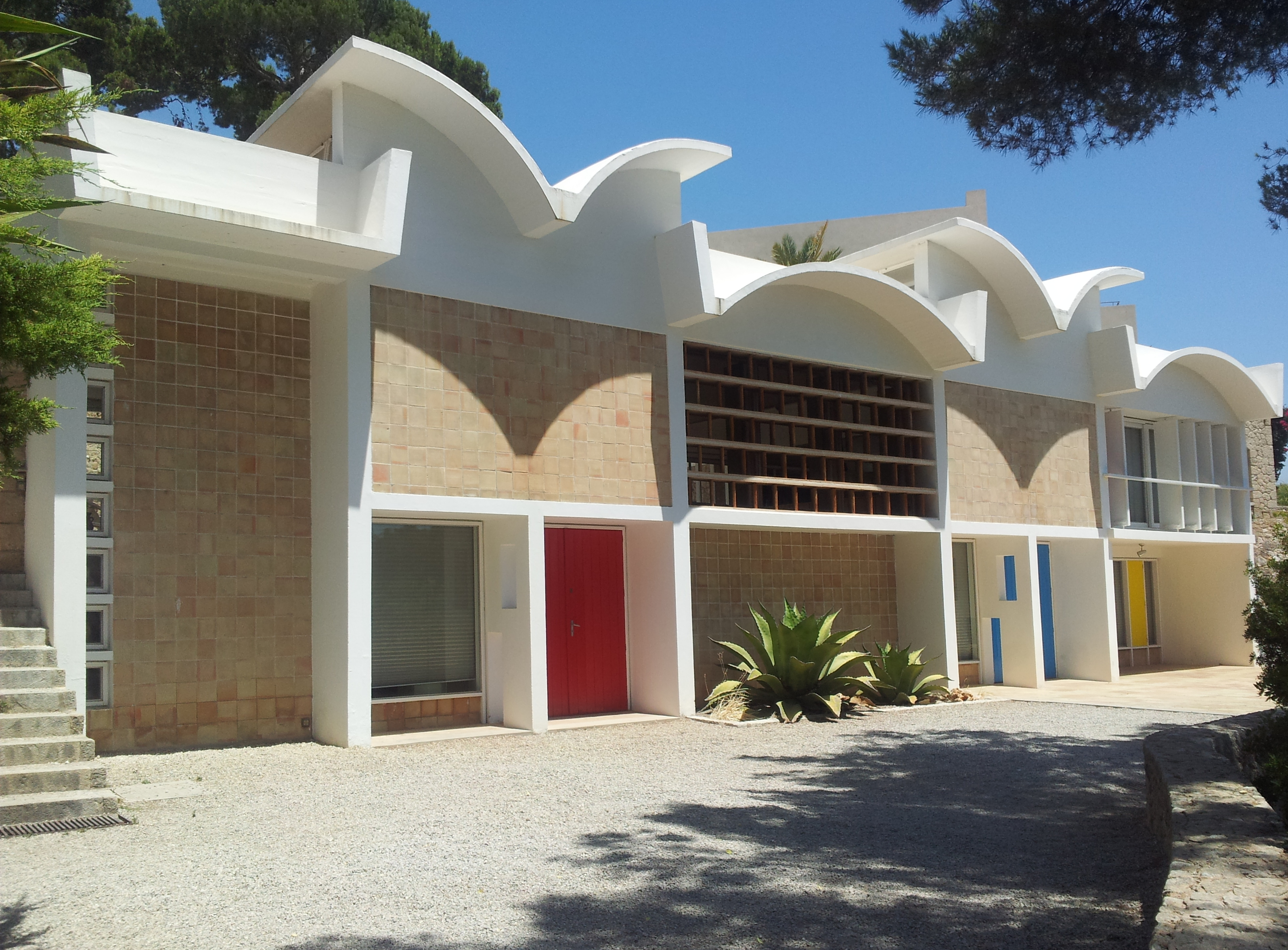
Joan Miró's Studio Sert in Palma de Mallorca

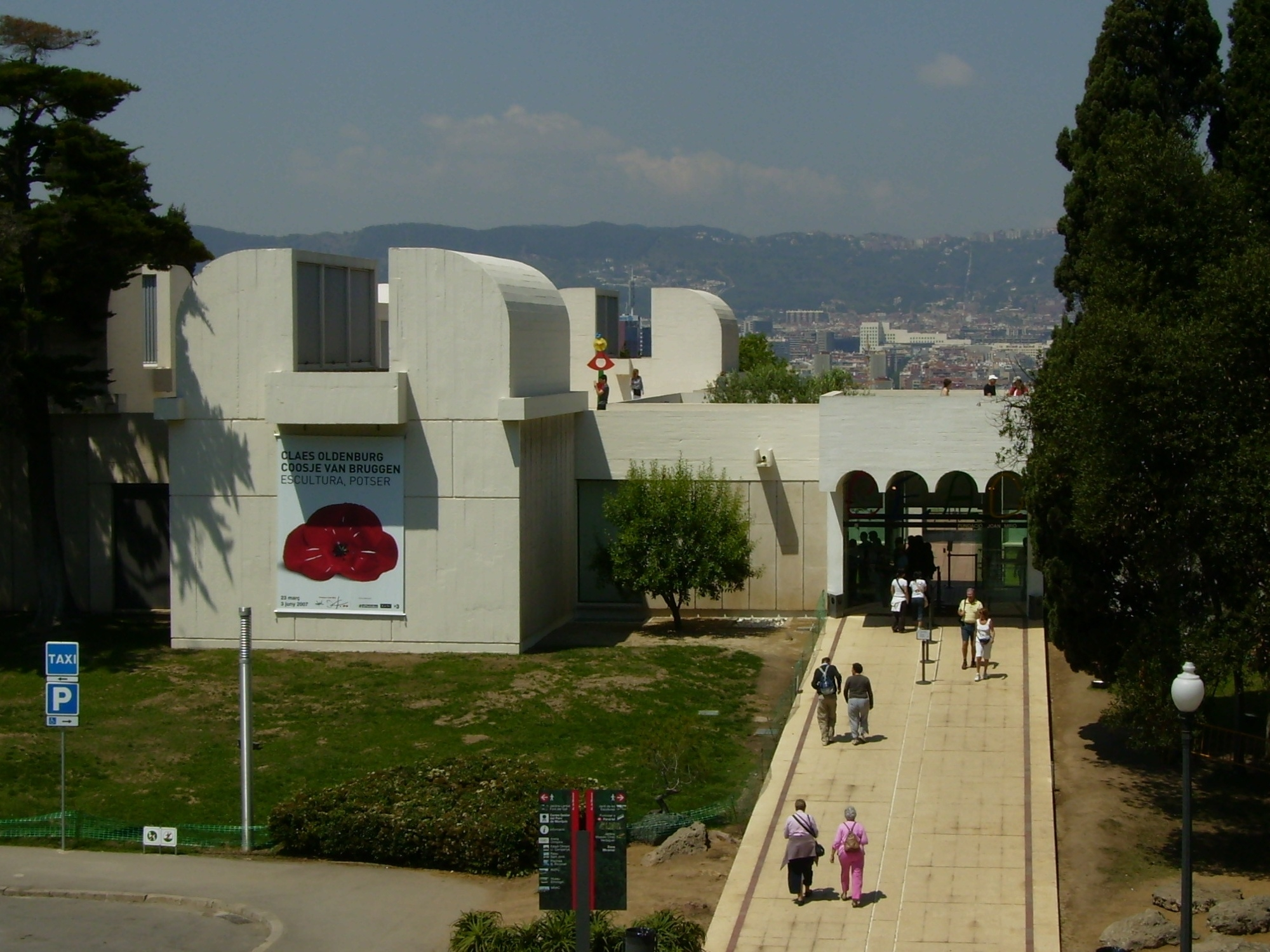
Fundació Joan Miró in Barcelona with sculptural roof forms designed to bring natural light into the galleries

In 1952, Sert held a one-year Visiting Professorship at Yale University. The following year he became Dean of the Harvard Graduate School of Design (1953–1969). There, Sert initiated the world's first degree program in urban design; integrated the programs of architecture, planning, landscape and urban design, and taught many of today's leading architects. During this period, he served on the advisory board of the newly created Graham Foundation in Chicago, Illinois.

In 1955, Sert founded a studio in Cambridge, Massachusetts which in 1958 became a partnership with Huson Jackson and Ronald Gourley. Joseph Zalewski was the Associate and continued to be in the firm Sert, Jackson and Associates founded in 1963. The studio designed many well-known projects including the Maeght Foundation (1959–1964) in southern France, the Fundació Miró (museum) in Barcelona (1975) and quite a few buildings for Harvard University, including Holyoke Center (1958–1965), the Harvard Science Center (1969–1972), Peabody Terrace (apartments, 1962–1964), and the Center for the Study of World Religions at the Harvard Divinity School. Among other notable buildings in the vicinity are a complex at Boston University including its law school, student union, and main library (1960–1965), Sert's home in Cambridge, as well as the Martin Luther King elementary school (1968–1971), located across from Peabody Terrace. In New York, he completed the Eastwood and Westview apartments on Roosevelt Island, NYC (1976).

In 1961, Sert brought Le Corbusier to the United States to design the Carpenter Center for the Visual Arts at Harvard, and a gallery in the Carpenter Center is now named in Sert's honor. In 1981, he received the AIA Gold Medal.

=== The art world ===
Josep Lluis Sert counted amongst his close friends the likes of Alexander Calder, Joan Miró, Georges Braque, and Marc Chagall, for whom he designed studios and homes. He brought art into the Harvard curriculum through his commissioning of the Carpenter Center and his subsequent avid support for it. His design for the Fondation Maeght in Saint-Paul-de-Vence, France, the Fundació Joan Miró in Barcelona and the Museum School were more than an architect-client relationship, they were partnerships in the discovery of modern art.

Among Sert's students and colleagues in his studio were leading and past master architects from the United States, Spain, France, Bolivia and Brazil, Venezuela, as well as Dolf Schnebli of Switzerland, Fumihiko Maki of Japan, and Christopher Charles Benninger of India.

== Major buildings and projects ==
- 1930–1931: Apartment Building at 342 Muntaner Street, Barcelona, Catalonia, Spain
- 1933–1934: Joieria J. Roca (currently, Boutique Rolex) at 18, Passeig de Gràcia, Barcelona, Catalonia, Spain
- 1934: Ciutat de Repòs i de Vacances, project, along the Garraf coast south of Barcelona, Catalonia, Spain
- 1933–1935: Dispensari Antituberculós, Barcelona, Catalonia, Spain
- 1932–1936: Casa Bloc, apartment building, Barcelona, Catalonia, Spain
- 1937: Pavilion of the Spanish Republic, Exposition Internationale des Arts et Techniques dans la Vie Moderne, Paris Rebuilt in 1992 in Barcelona, Catalonia, Spain
- 1955: Joan Miró studio (Fundació Pilar i Joan Miró), Palma, Majorca, Spain
- 1955-1958: Havana Plan Piloto, Havana Cuba.
- 1955–1961: Embassy of the United States, Baghdad, Iraq (abandoned 1990)
- 1957: Sert's home at 64 Francis Avenue, Cambridge, Massachusetts
- 1958–1960: Center for the Study of World Religions, Harvard Divinity School, Cambridge, Massachusetts
- 1958–1965: Holyoke Center (Now) Smith Campus Center, Harvard University, Cambridge, Massachusetts
- 1965: Peabody Terrace, Harvard University, Cambridge, Massachusetts
- 1959–1964: Fondation Maeght in Saint-Paul de Vence, France
- 1964: The Can Pep Simó Estate in Jesús, Ibiza.
- 1969: Hotel at Cala d'en Serra, Ibiza, Spain (abandoned)
- 1969: Eastwood and Westview apartment complexes, Roosevelt Island, New York
- 1971: Carmel de la Paix in Mazille (Saône-et-Loire), France
- 1973: Harvard Science Center, Harvard University, Cambridge, Massachusetts
- 1975: Fundació Joan Miró, Barcelona, Catalonia, Spain

== Bibliography ==
- Mumford, Eric (2015) The Writings of Lluis Sert, 184 pages, Yale University Press, English; ISBN 978-0300207392
- Mumford, Eric, and Sarkis, Eric editors (2008) Harvard University Graduate School of Design: Josep Lluis Sert: The Architect of Urban Design 1953–1969; Yale University Press, English; ISBN 978-0300120653
- VV.AA., 4 Centenarios: Luis Barragán, Marcel Breuer, Ärne Jacobsen, José Luis Sert, (4 volúmenes), Valladolid, Spain, ISBN 84-8448-199-9, 2002, Universidad de Valladolid, Página Web
- Rovira, Josep M. (2000, Spanish); Saavedra, Leonara (2004, English translation): Jose Luis Sert 1901-1983 (Modern Masters) Electra Milano, distributed by Phaidon Press; ISBN 1-904313-21-3.
- Tyrwhitt, J., Sert, J.L., Rogers, E.N., Gropius, W., Neutra, R., Sweeney, J.L., Steinberg, S., et al. editors (1952) CIAM 8: The Heart of the City: Towards the Humanization of Human Life. 185 pages; Lund Humphries; ASIN:B00170PZDO
