= Smith Campus Center =

Administrative and service building at Harvard University

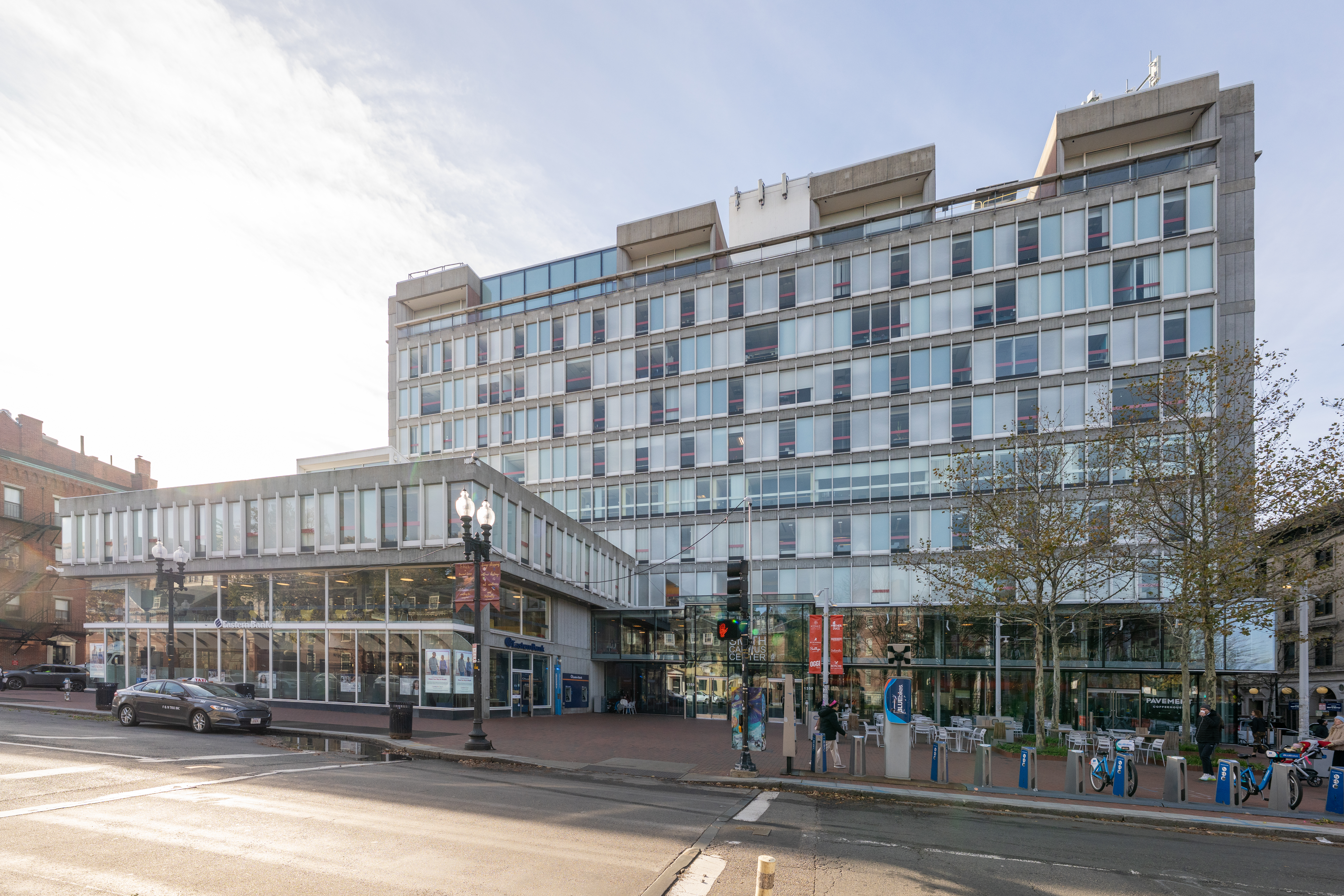
- (2025)
- Interactive map of the Smith Campus Center area
- Former names: Holyoke Center

General information
- Architectural style: Brutalist
- Location: 1350 Massachusetts Avenue, Cambridge, Massachusetts, United States
- Coordinates: 42.37278°N 71.11861°W
- Construction started: 1960
- Completed: 1966
- Owner: Harvard University

Height
- Height: 167 feet (51 m)

Technical details
- Floor count: 10
- Floor area: 360,000 sq ft (33,000 m^{2})

Design and construction
- Architect: Josep Lluís Sert
- Architecture firm: Sert, Jackson and Gourley

Harvard University's Smith Campus Center (formerly Holyoke Center) is a brutalist administrative and service building located in Harvard Square, Cambridge, Massachusetts. Opposite the Wadsworth Gate to Harvard Yard on Massachusetts Avenue, it functions as a student center, as well as housing Harvard administrative offices, University Health Services, and a restaurant arcade.

== Design ==
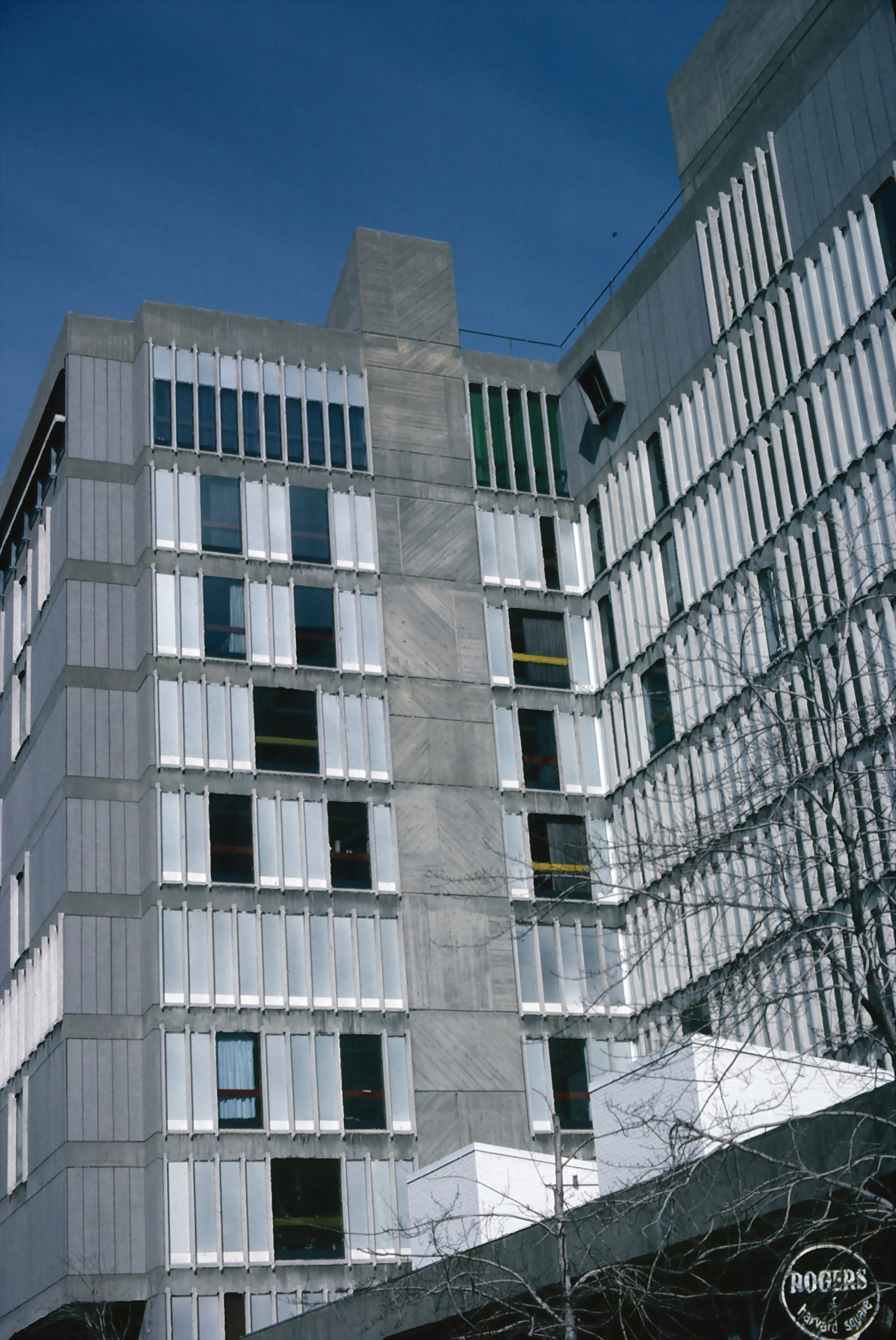
Holyoke Center from Dunster Street (1978)

Primarily designed by Josep Lluís Sert (then dean of the Harvard Graduate School of Design) and completed in 1966, the Smith Campus Center is an H-shaped ten-story reinforced concrete building. Low-rise portions, including an underground parking garage, have a larger footprint of 360,000 square feet (33,000 m^{2}). The building was constructed in two phases over a six-year period between 1960 and 1966. The first phase—the southern half of the building facing Mount Auburn Street—began in 1960 and was occupied in 1962. Construction of the second phase began in 1964 and was completed in 1966. The landscaped area at the corner of Massachusetts Avenue and Dunster Street—known as Forbes Plaza—was completed the following year in 1967. As a permanent tribute, the plaza and arcade inside the Holyoke Center were named in honor of Edward W. Forbes. The occasion was marked by a ceremony on October 17, 1966

After the first phase of construction in 1963, the Harvard Crimson cited a local joke: "The one nice feature about Holyoke Center is that it's the one place in Cambridge from which you can't see Holyoke Center". Within a few years the building's novel design and technical features began to present numerous difficulties, which a Harvard official likened to "a five-car accident at an intersection. You just can't tell what caused it." These included crumbling of exterior structural concrete and an inefficient three-pipe heating and cooling system.

It was Harvard's first highrise building, and has been called a "gray elephant" for the color of its concrete facades.

== Artworks ==
From 1964 to 1979, the penthouse dining room was decorated with five large paintings installed by Mark Rothko, an Abstract Expressionist artist. Due to high levels of direct sunlight onto the paintings and the presence of lithol red's calcium salt, the paintings faded severely and were moved to protective storage in 1979. Since their removal, the artworks have been publicly displayed only five times, most recently from November 2014 to July 2015, at the newly renovated Harvard Art Museums.

== Renaming and renovation ==
Originally known as Holyoke Center, in 2013 it was renamed the Richard A. and Susan F. Smith Campus Center. Over the next several years, its underwent extensive renovation to create gathering, lounge, and study spaces, and space for exhibitions, events, and performances, after reopening in 2018.
