= Architecture of Boston =

Built environment in Massachusetts, USA

Five Centuries of Boston Architecture

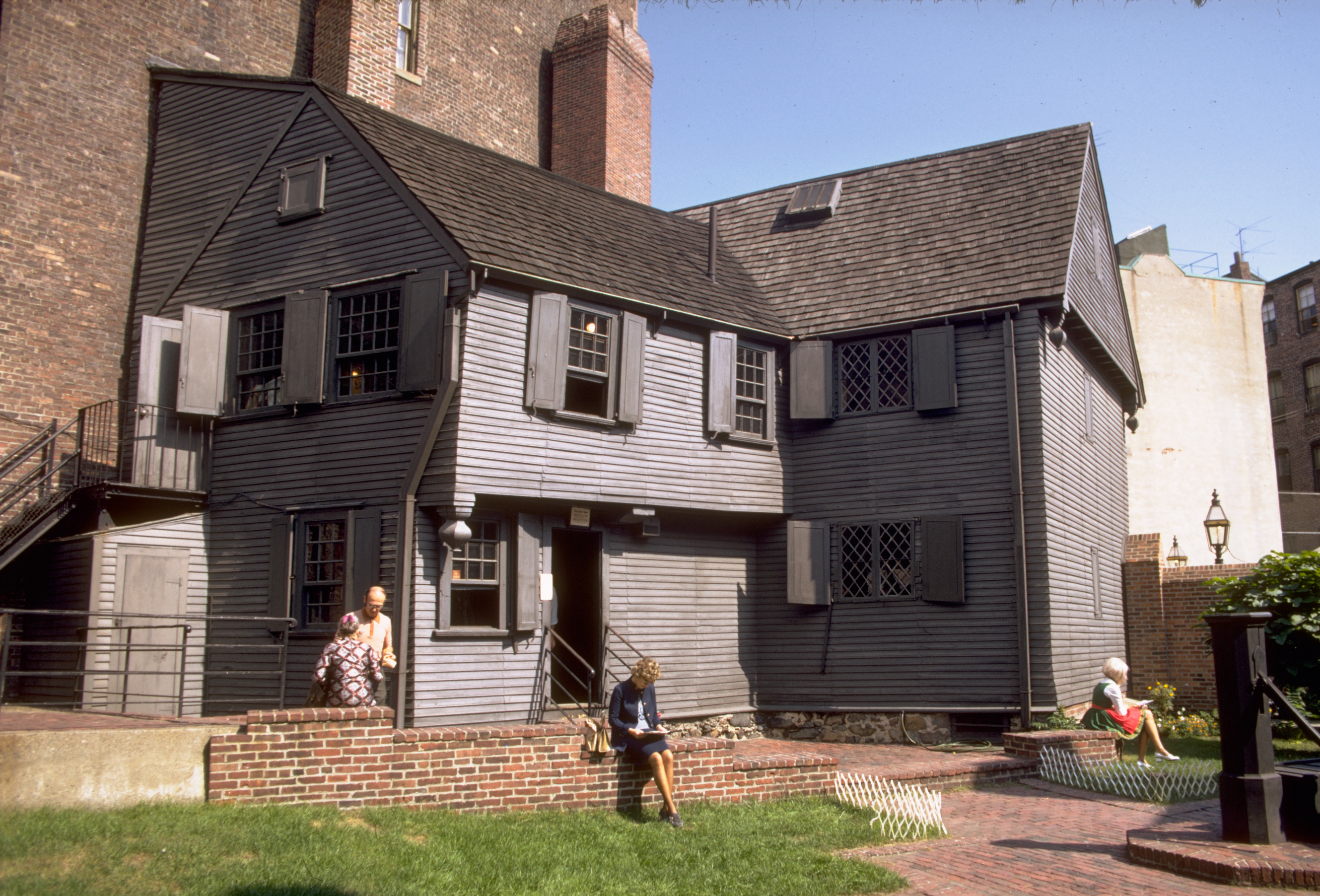
Paul Revere House (c. 1680)

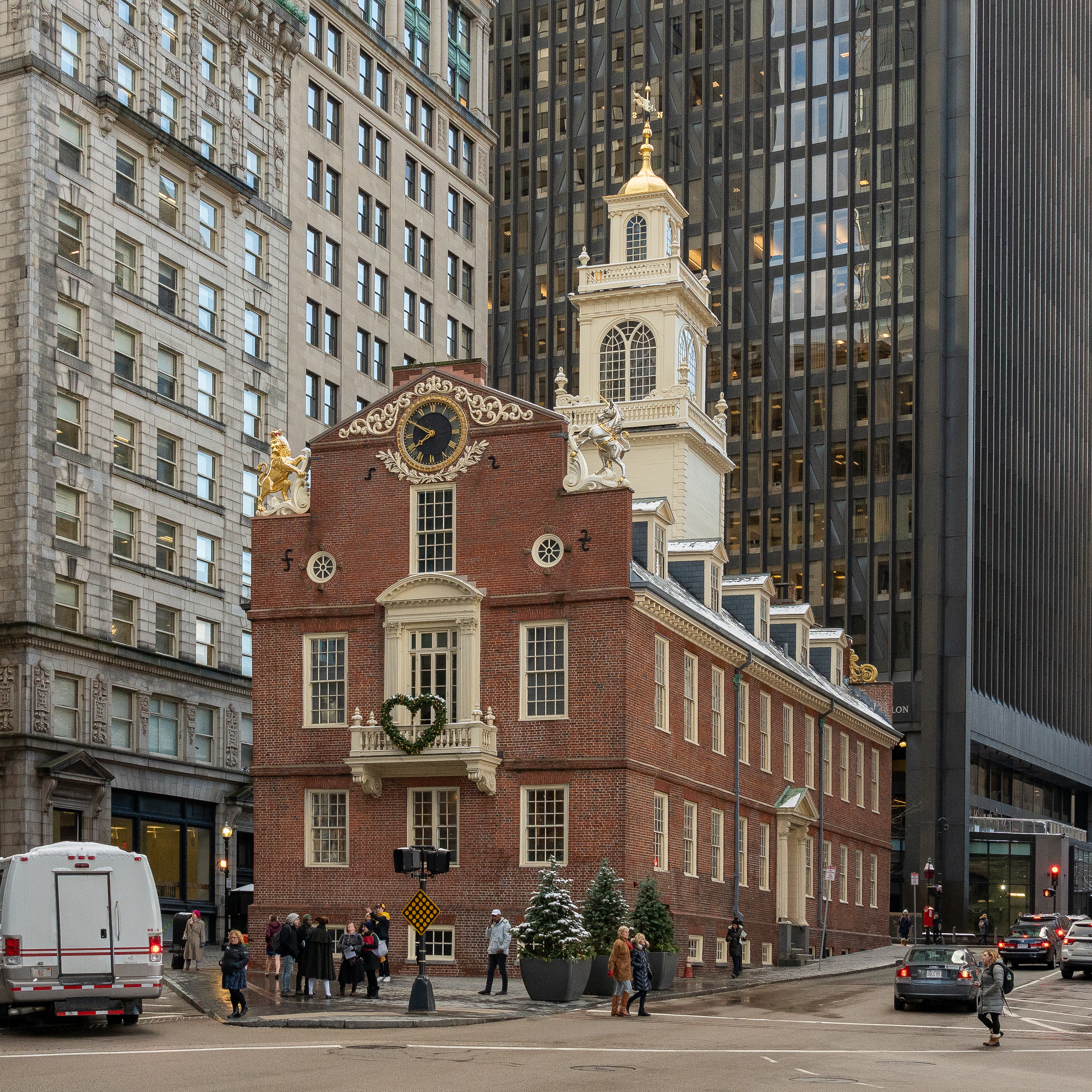
Old State House (1713)

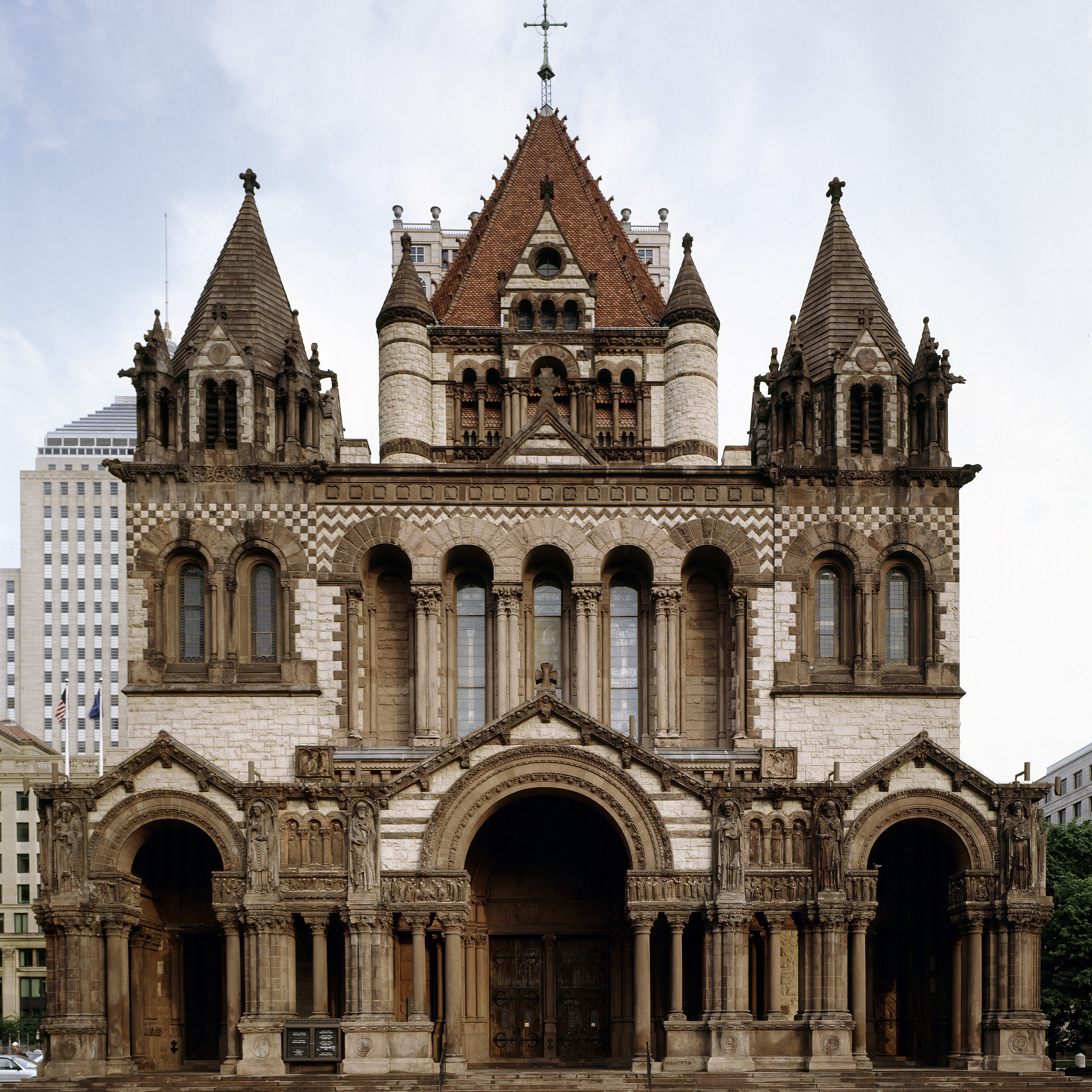
Trinity Church (1872)

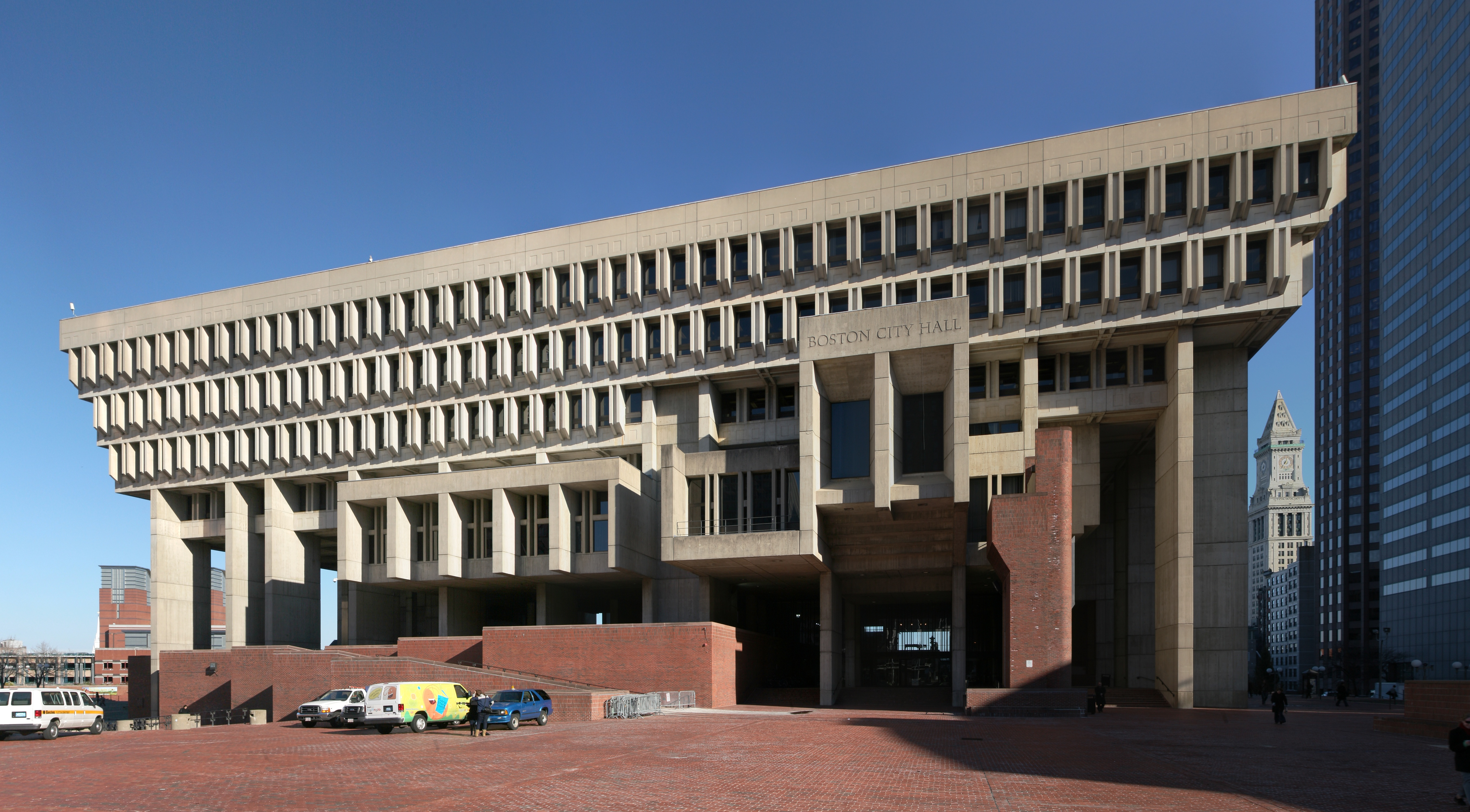
City Hall (1963–68)

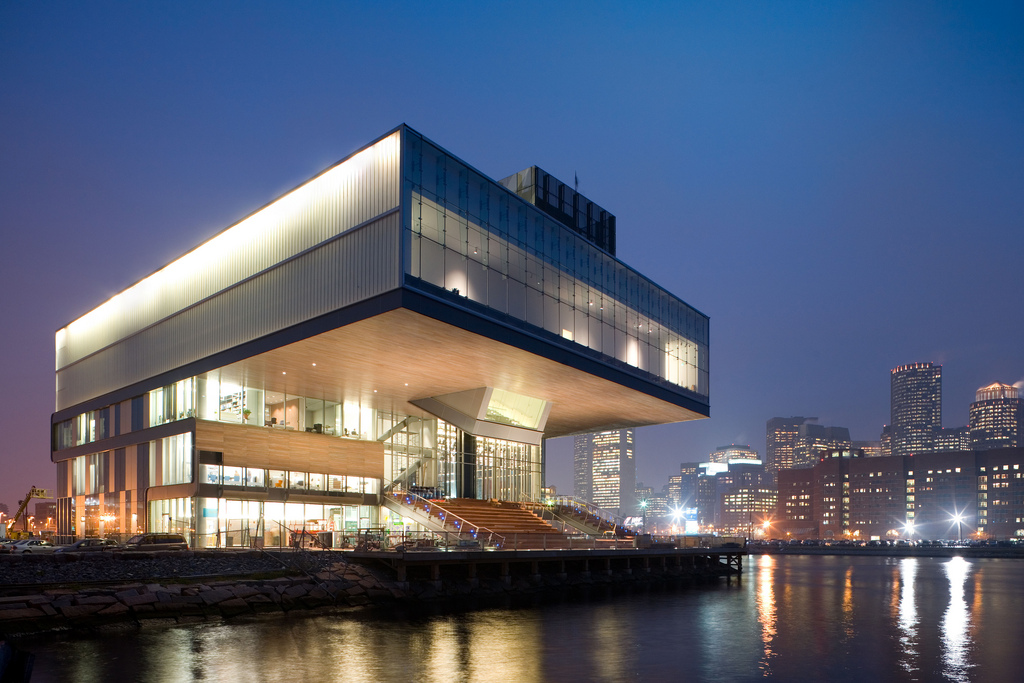
Institute of Contemporary Art (2006)

The architecture of Boston is a robust combination of old and new architecture. As one of the oldest cities in North America, Boston, Massachusetts (along with its surrounding area) has accumulated buildings and structures ranging from the 17th-century to the present day, having evolved from a small port town to a large cosmopolitan center for education, industry, finance, and technology. The city is known for its granite buildings stemming from its early days. It is also known for being one of the origins of Federal Architecture.

== History ==
=== Colonial and Post-Revolutionary periods ===
Boston was founded by Puritan settlers. With them, they brought architecture from England, which ultimately morphed into colonial-style buildings when mixed with other styles such as Georgian architecture. Certain buildings such as the Paul Revere House, Old State House and originally Faneuil Hall embodied this style. The Boston Common was established in 1634, and is now the oldest park in the United States. It originally touched mudflats that led into the harbor, which have since been filled in to form the Back Bay neighborhood and the Boston Public Garden. The land-reclamation project of the early 19th century gradually changed the geography of Boston from a peninsular town with a narrow isthmus connecting it into the mainland into the current coastline seen today.

The American Revolution resulted in many fortifications being built, notably in Dorchester Heights. Following the war which led to American independence, Federal architecture blossomed in the city with Charles Bulfinch and Asher Benjamin as lead architect in that style. It was also accompanied by Greek Revival, with Benjamin as one of the leading architects there. The Massachusetts State House and the rebuilt Faneuil Hall are prime examples of Federal architecture. Many Federal-style buildings and rowhouses can be found in the neighborhood of Beacon Hill.

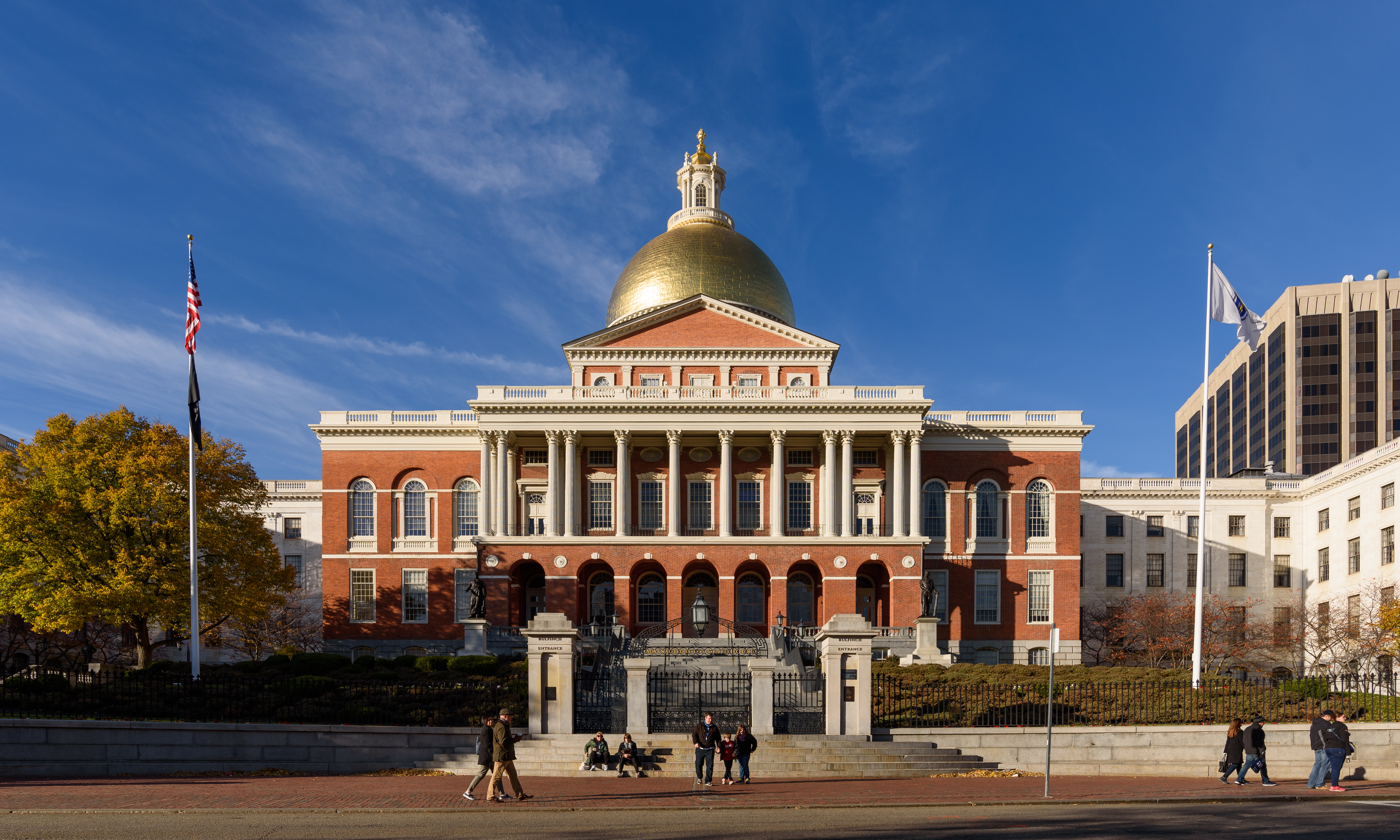
The Massachusetts State House (1795–1798) designed by Charles Bulfinch is a prominent example of Federal architecture

=== 19th century, Civil War and expansion ===
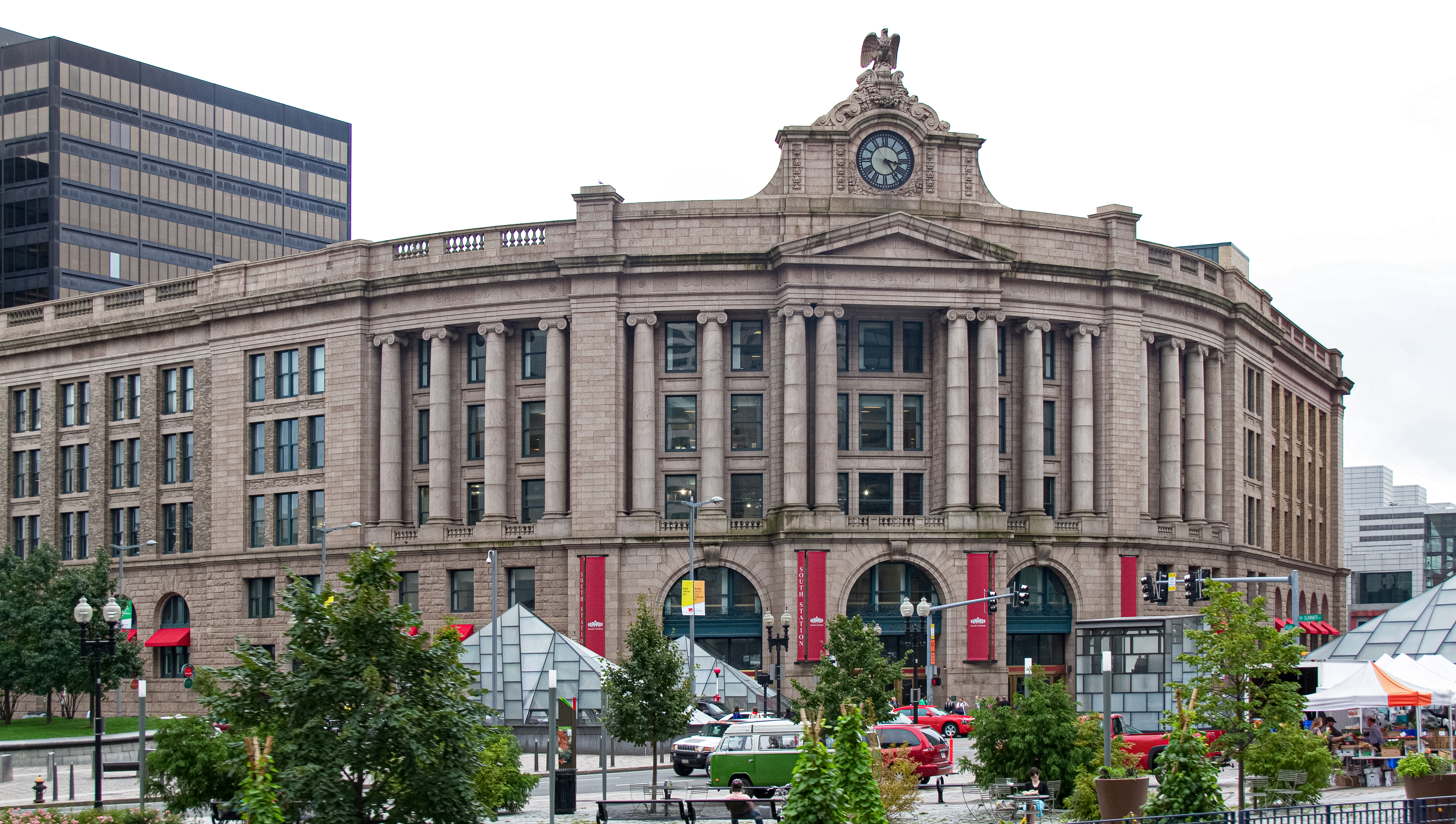
South Station (1899), designed by Shepley, Rutan and Coolidge

In the early 19th century, many buildings in the city were criticized as plain-looking and conservatively planned. However, under new architect Gridley J.F. Bryant, son of the engineer Gridley Bryant, Boston gained numerous buildings and structures during a period of growth that saw the construction of many Victorian-style public buildings. These include the Quincy School, Massachusetts State House's second addition, the 1847 version of Salem station, Charles Street Jail, Ballou Hall, the Old City Hall, Arlington Street Church and others.

Bryant's partner (John Hubbard Sturgis) and apprentice (Charles Brigham) have also been very influential on 19th-century architecture in Boston, at one time partnering up to start their own firm. Their 1876 building for the Boston Museum of Fine Arts (since demolished) was one of their signature works.

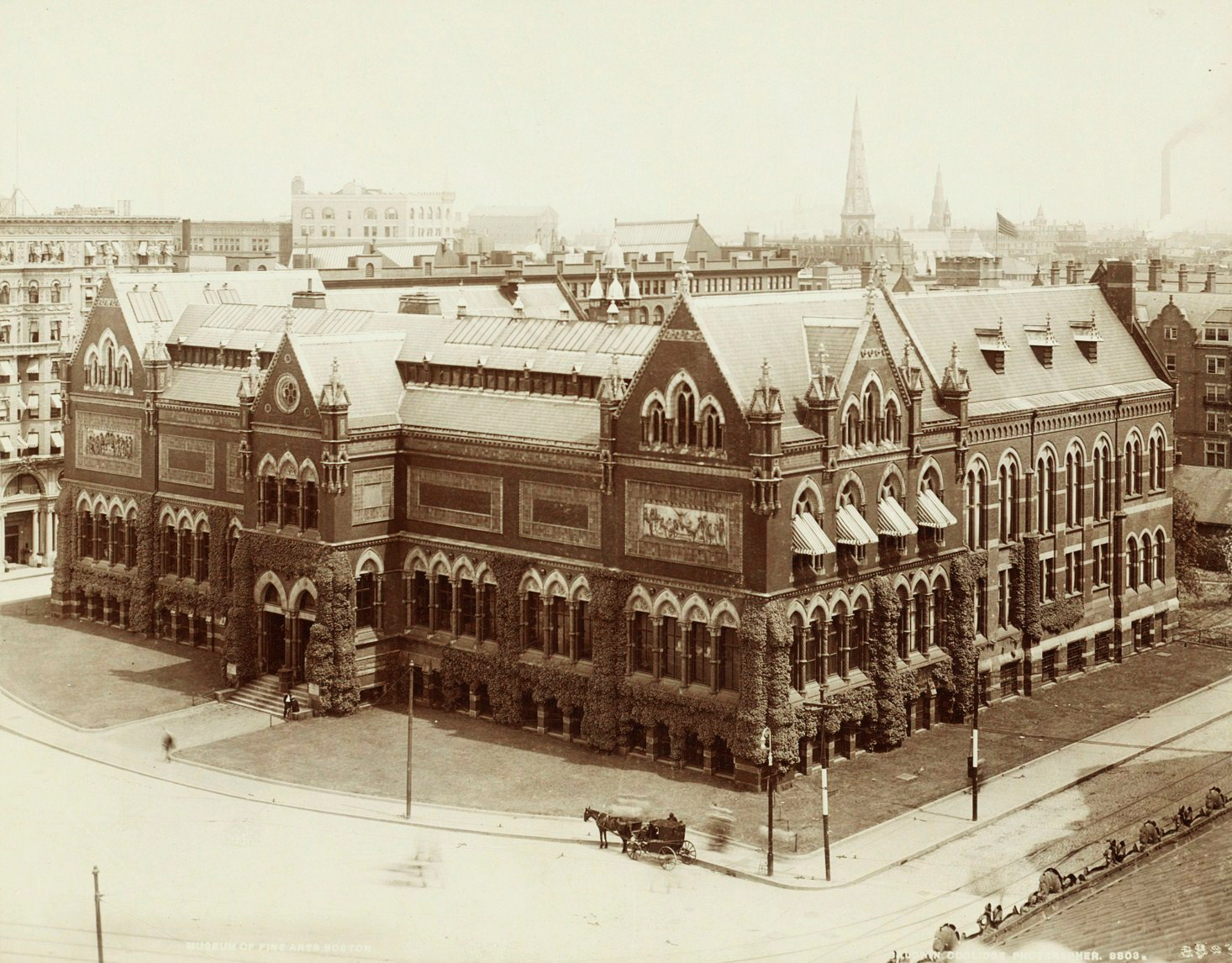
The 1876 Boston Museum of Fine Arts building

The iconic train stations for the city, namely South Station and North Station, were originally constructed during the close of the century to centralize transportation. Despite undergoing numerous renovations, they are still used today.

=== 20th century ===
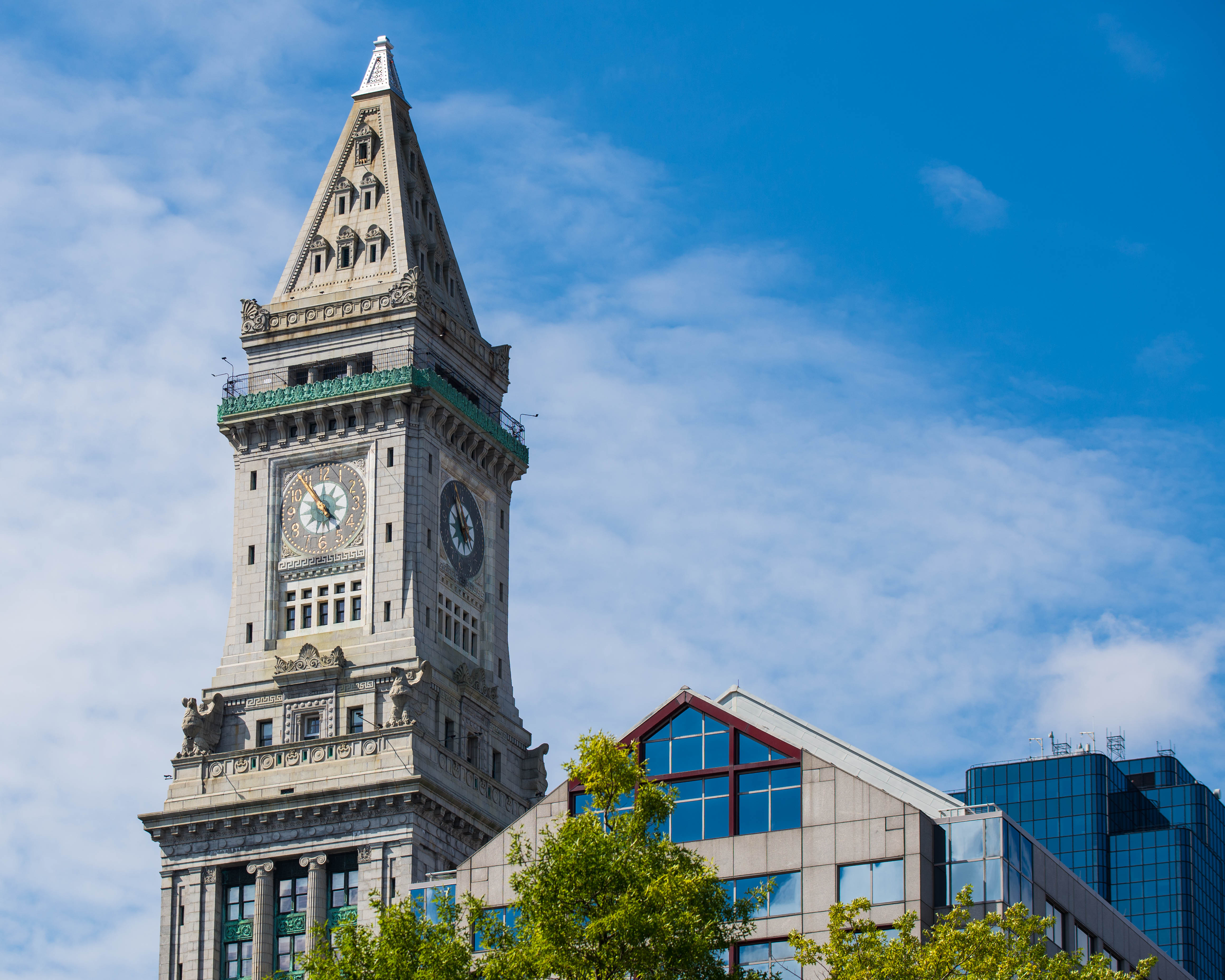
Custom House Tower (1915), designed by Peabody and Stearns Greek Revival style

The early 20th century introduced Art Deco buildings into the city and taller buildings. The Custom House Tower was notable for being an expansion of the original Custom House building and being the first building to surpass the 125 feet (38 m) height restriction, as it was exempt from city ordinances due to being federally owned. The original John Hancock Tower was added in 1947. Sports venues such as Fenway Park and the Boston Garden were built during this time as well.

The Interstate Highway system was built during the latter 20th century after many years of planning. Construction of the Central Artery (Interstate 93) and the Massachusetts Turnpike (Interstate 90) provided better roads into the city but resulted in the demolition of numerous buildings and disruption of neighborhoods. In addition, they led to heavy traffic congestion. The Central Artery, in particular, consisted of the two bounds of elevated highway stacked on top of each other. It was loathed by many of the city's inhabitants, who called it "The Distressway", "the largest parking lot in the world", and "other Green Monster" in reference to the green paint of the section in Fenway Park.

Boston City Hall was built during this time, and was a classic example of Brutalist architecture used mainly for government buildings. The Government Center neighborhood, consisting of courthouses and other federal and state buildings, was built around City Hall, as part of an effort to gentrify the former Scollay Square.

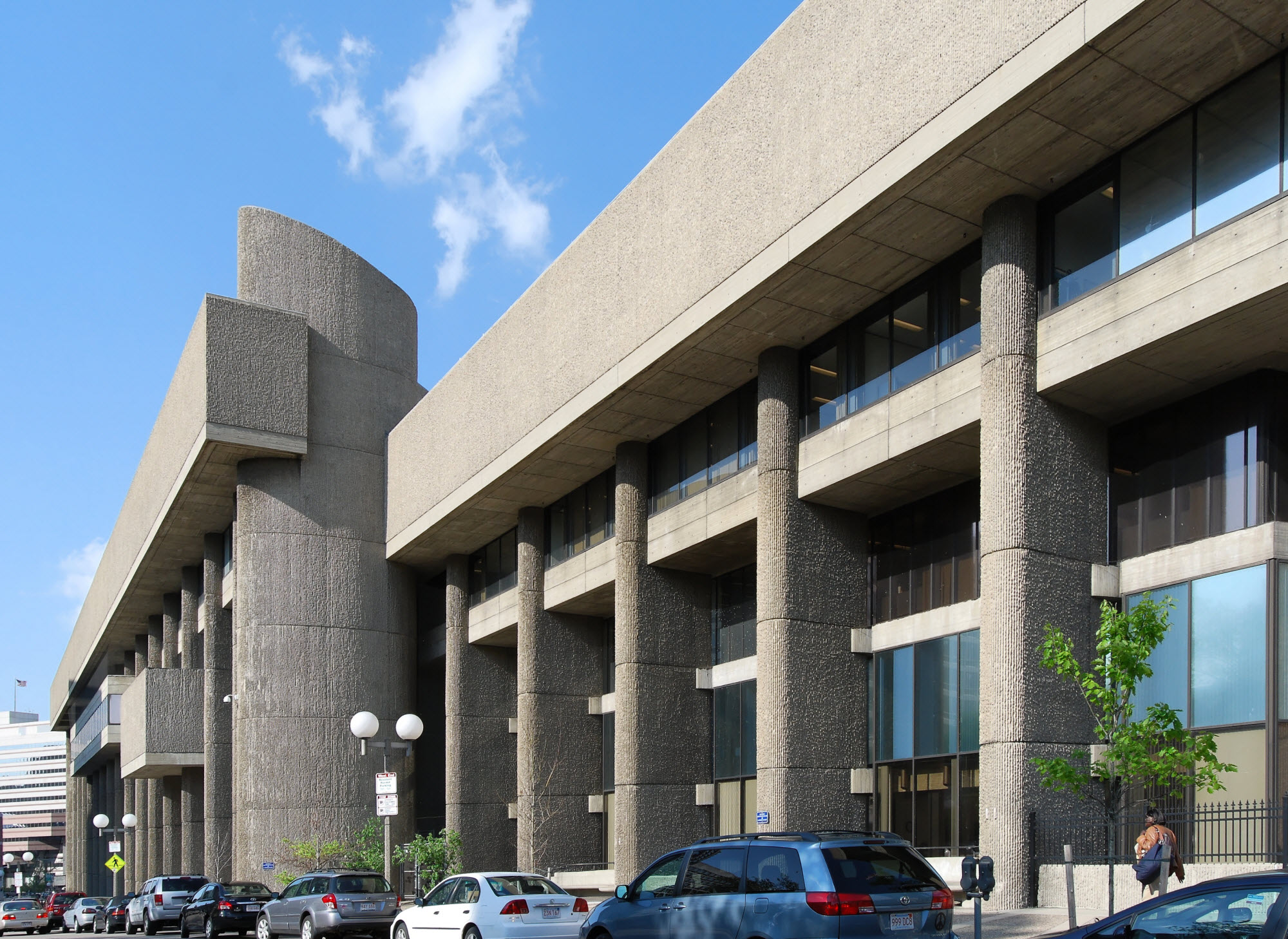
Government Service Center (1966–71), designed by Paul Rudolph

Two of the most iconic skyscrapers in Boston were built during the latter 20th century. The Prudential Tower, located in Back Bay, was completed in 1964, while the John Hancock Tower, which was the third such building constructed by John Hancock Insurance, was completed in 1976. The tower, now known as 200 Claredon Street, remains the tallest building in Boston and New England. The Prudential and Hancock Towers anchor a string of skyscrapers in Back Bay known as the High Spine, which stands out against the surrounding Victorian-era buildings of the neighborhood. Many of the skyscrapers in the Financial District were also built during the 1960s and 1970s as part of a skyscraper boom.

=== 21st century ===
One of the biggest engineering projects in Boston during the onset of the 2000s was the Big Dig, which effectively moved the elevated highway portion of the Central Artery underground into tunnels. This freed up some space which was converted into surface-level streets and a new public park, now called the Rose Fitzgerald Kennedy Greenway. In addition, I-90 was extended to Boston Logan International Airport.

The 2000s saw a revival of skyscraper building after a dormant 1990s decade. A number of contemporary skyscrapers, such as the Millennium Tower were built, but others such as One Lincoln Street incorporated elements of past styles such as Art Deco into its design.

== Notable buildings and structures ==
Many of Boston's tallest buildings are in two areas, namely the Back Bay neighborhood and Downtown, which can be divided into Government Center, the Financial Center, Downtown Crossing, among others. Other neighborhoods such as North End, South Boston, and Dorchester have distinctive architectural styles, in addition to surrounding suburbs such as Cambridge and Brookline.

=== Government and municipal ===
As the state capital of Massachusetts and one of the largest cities in the Northeast, Boston is home to many government and municipal buildings which range in architectural styles. These buildings include but are not limited to:

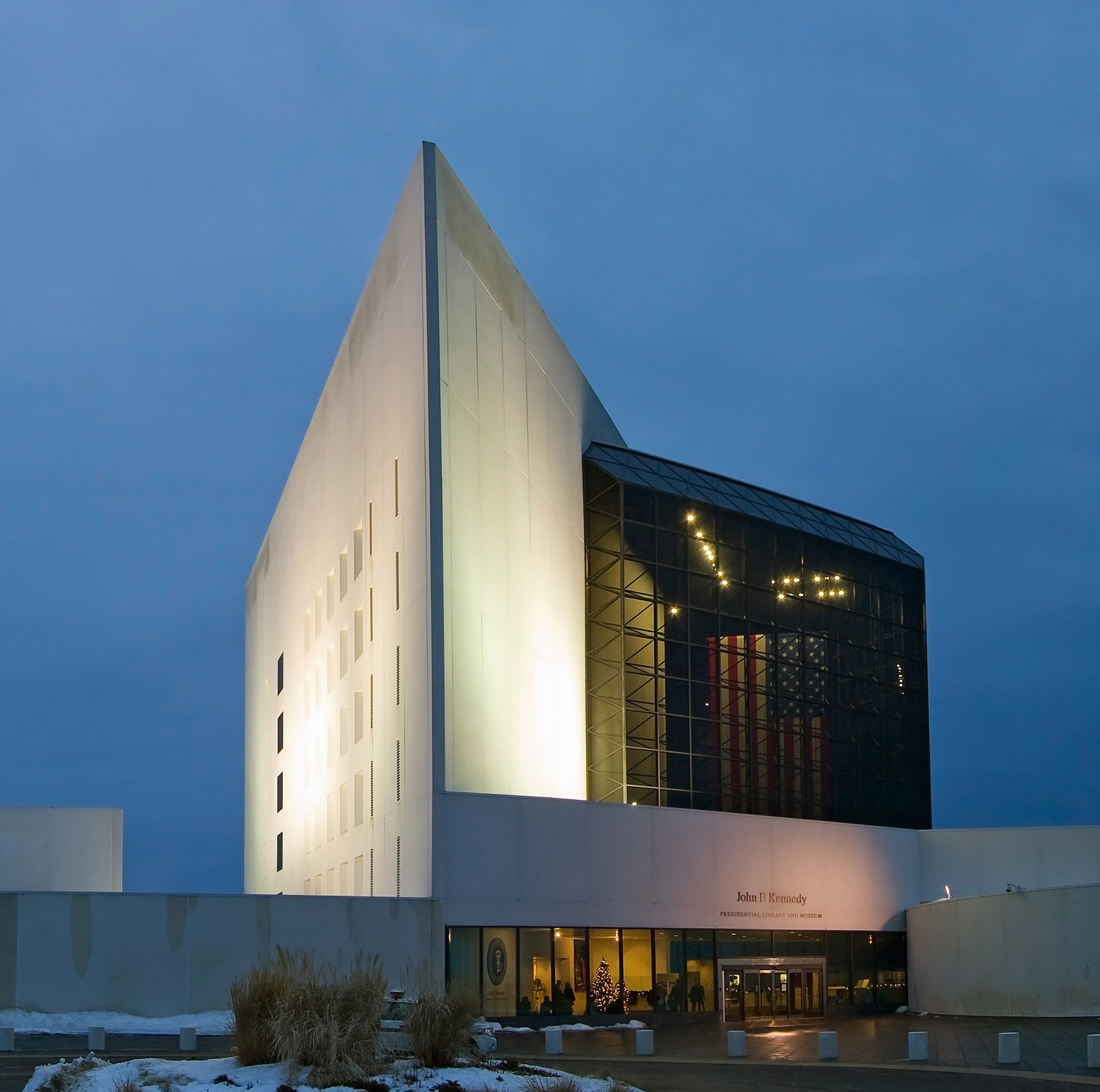
John F. Kennedy Presidential Library and Museum (1977–79), designed by I. M. Pei

- Massachusetts State House
- Boston City Hall
- Federal Reserve Bank Building (Boston)
- John F. Kennedy Presidential Library and Museum
- South Station
- Suffolk County Courthouse
- Rose Fitzgerald Kennedy Greenway

The Brutalist City Hall building has been one of the most divisive buildings in the city, sparking outrage from certain people who call for its demolition, but being praised by architects and critics as one of the proudest buildings in the city's history.

=== Education ===
Boston is known as a major college town, being home to many academic institutions such as Massachusetts Institute of Technology, Harvard University, Northeastern University, Boston College, Boston University, Tufts University, Suffolk University, and others. Their campuses contain notable buildings in traditional and contemporary styles. They include:

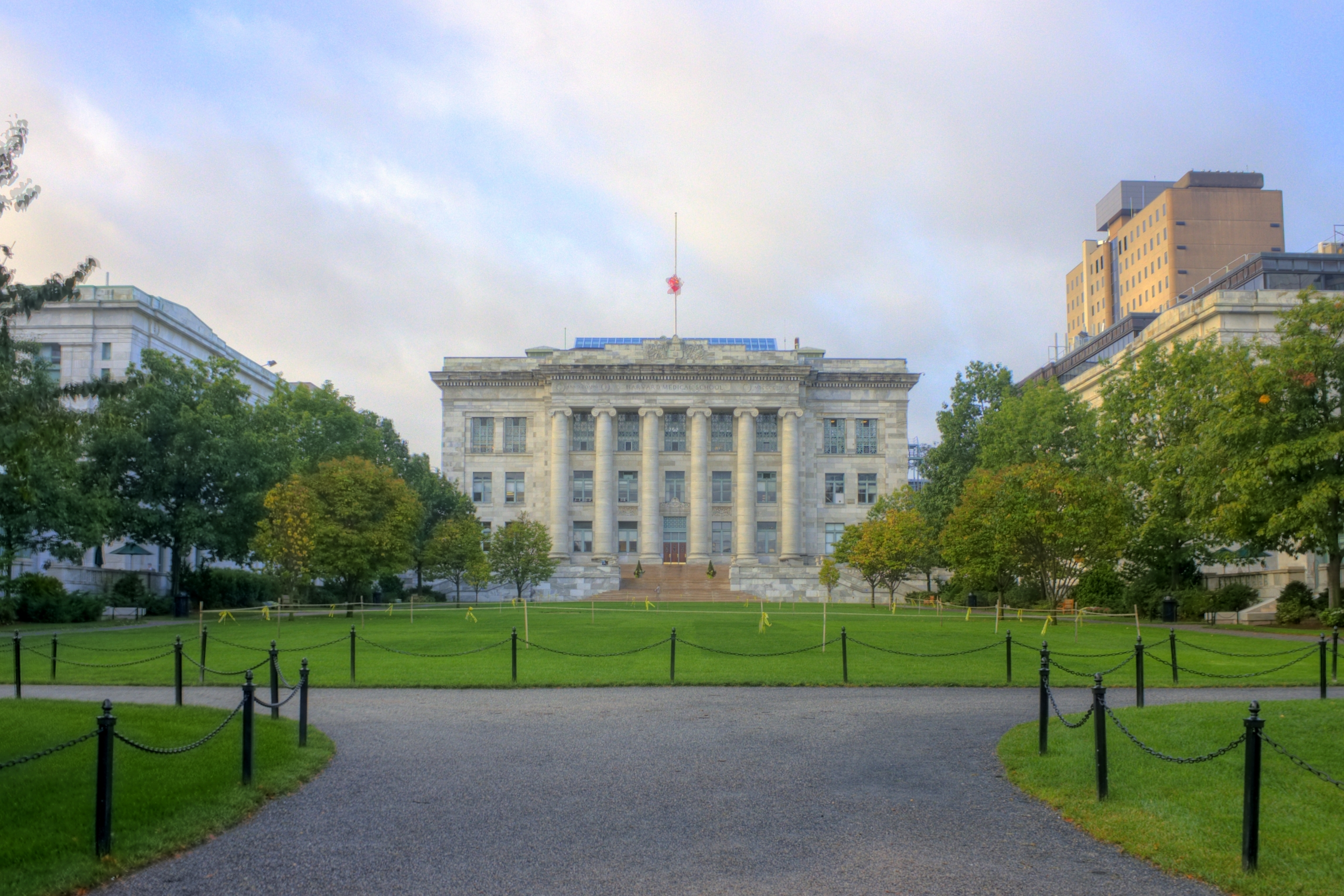
Harvard Medical School, (1906), designed by Shepley, Rutan and Coolidge

- Harvard Stadium
- Harvard Business School
- The Class of 1959 Chapel
- Harvard Medical School
- Tufts Medical Center

=== Religious buildings ===
Boston is home to many religious buildings as part of its Christian heritage. There are numerous large cathedrals such as St. Leonard's Church, the Cathedral of the Holy Cross, the First Church in Boston, and the Old South Church. In addition, the Old South Meeting House is a former Puritan church known as the meeting house of the Boston Tea Party. More modern buildings include the recent additions to The First Church of Christ, Scientist, originally designed and built by Charles Brigham, as part of the Christian Science Center.

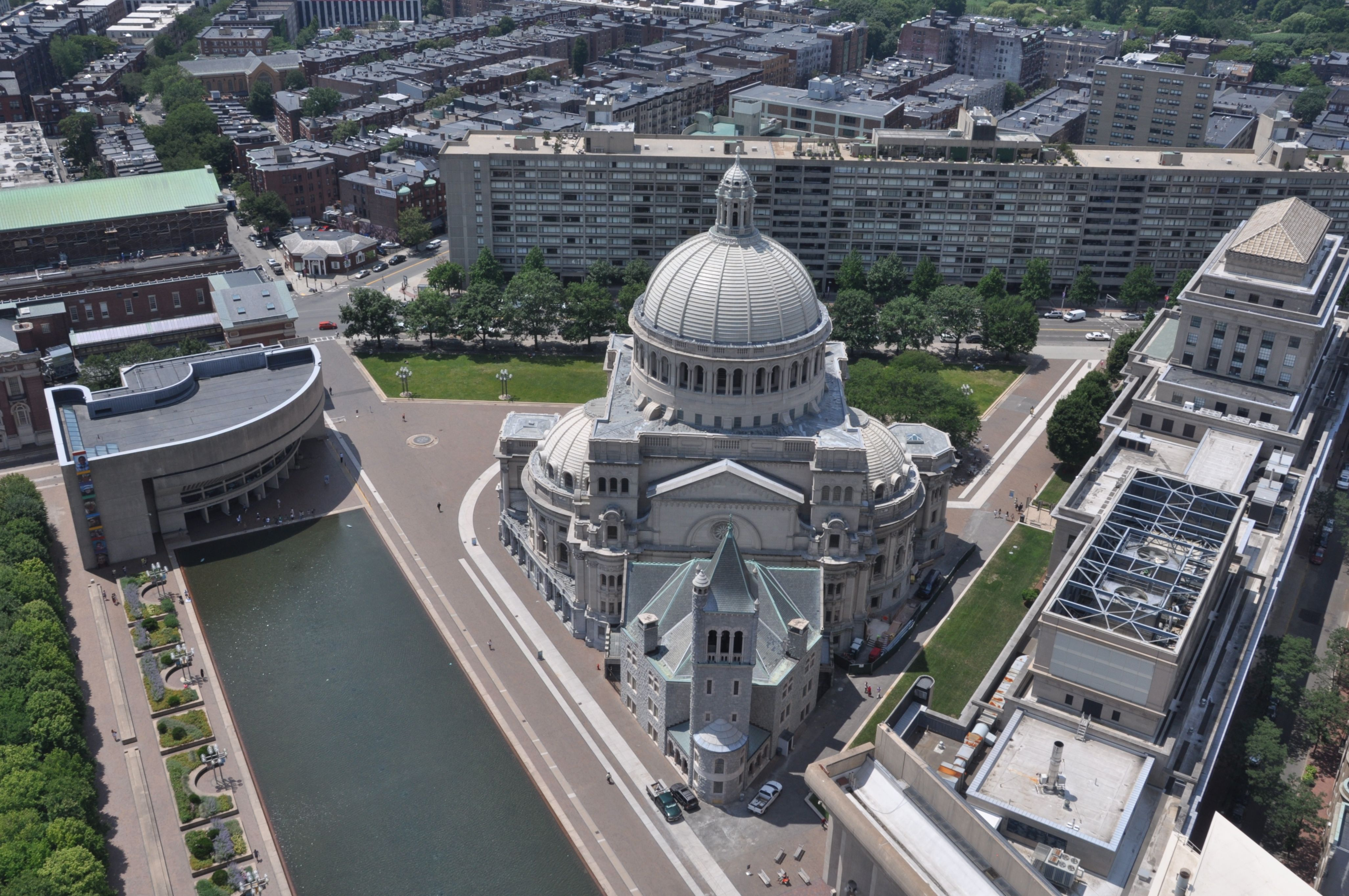
First Church of Christ, Scientist (1906), Charles Brigham

=== Sports ===
- Fenway Park
- TD Garden
- Matthews Arena
- Boston Garden (defunct)

=== Skyscrapers ===
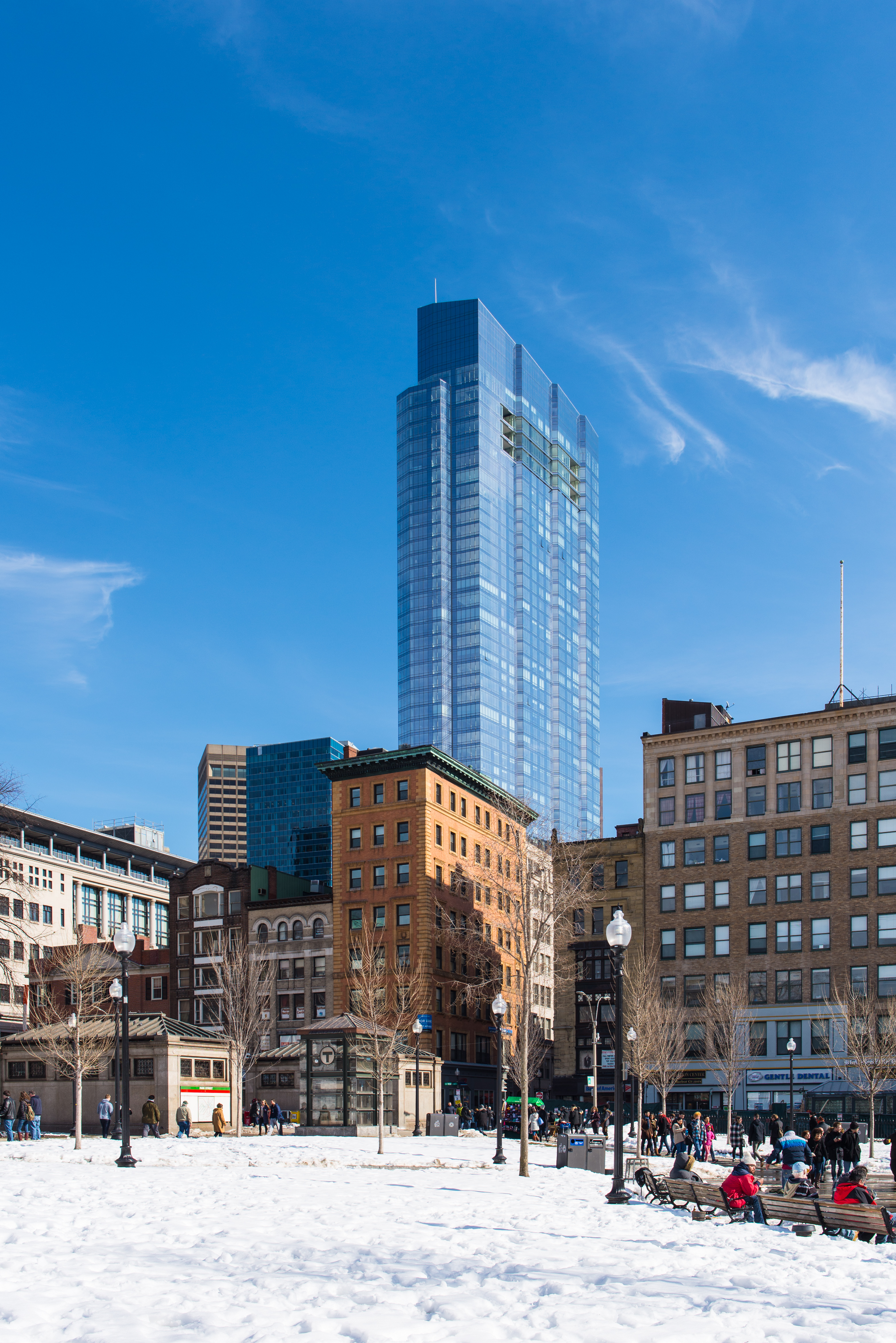
The Millennium Tower is the tallest building in Downtown Crossing

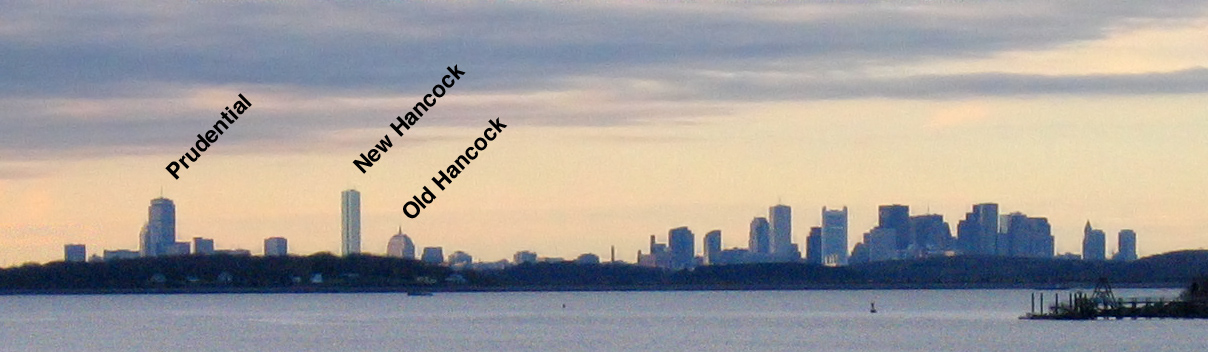
Boston skyline from World's End in Hingham, Massachusetts

The first true skyscraper in the city was the 13-story Ames Building, but since then, more skyscrapers have been built, with most of them rising in the latter half of the 20th century. There are also numerous buildings currently proposed or under construction.

==== Ten tallest buildings in the city of Boston ====
Rank	Name	Height ft (m)	Floors
1	John Hancock Tower (200 Claredon Street)	790 (241)	60
2	Prudential Tower	749 (228)	52
3	Four Seasons Hotel & Private Residences, One Dalton Street	742 (226)	61
4	Millennium Tower	685 (209)	60
5	Federal Reserve Bank Building	614 (187)	32
6	One Boston Place	601 (183)	41
7	One International Place	600 (183)	46
8	100 Federal Street	591 (180)	37
9	One Financial Center	590 (180)	46
10	111 Huntington Avenue	554 (169)	36

== See also ==
- Boston Landmark
