= High Spine =

Architectural planning design

Boston's High Spine is an architectural planning design that arose in 1961, designed by the Committee of Civic Design, part of the Boston Society of Architects. The basic idea of the High Spine is to create a string of skyscrapers that runs from Massachusetts Avenue to the Fort Point Channel, traversing the southern Back Bay between Boylston Street on the north and Huntington Avenue and Columbus Avenue on the south. The spine then heads eastward, between the Boston Common and Downtown Crossing areas to the north and the Bay Village and Chinatown neighborhoods to the south, and including the campuses of Emerson College and Suffolk University. It then enters the Financial District and Government Center areas before ending with a string of transit oriented development projects near North Station. Practically all of Boston's skyscrapers are located along this roughly 2 mile (3.5 km) corridor. The western part of the corridor follows an area along and directly north of the Massachusetts Turnpike that was extended along the Boston and Albany Railroad tracks and includes some former rail yards. With development concentrated along the spine, the nearby residential neighborhoods such as Beacon Hill could retain their historic low-rise character, and it gave the city a distinctive skyline that acts as a visual reference for one's location within the city.

== Buildings of the High Spine ==
Two peaks of the High Spine, the John Hancock Tower and the Prudential Tower are found in Boston's Back Bay between Massachusetts Avenue and Arlington Street. Others include One Dalton, 111 Huntington Avenue, 500 Boylston Street and the Berkeley Building, which are all visible from outside the city.

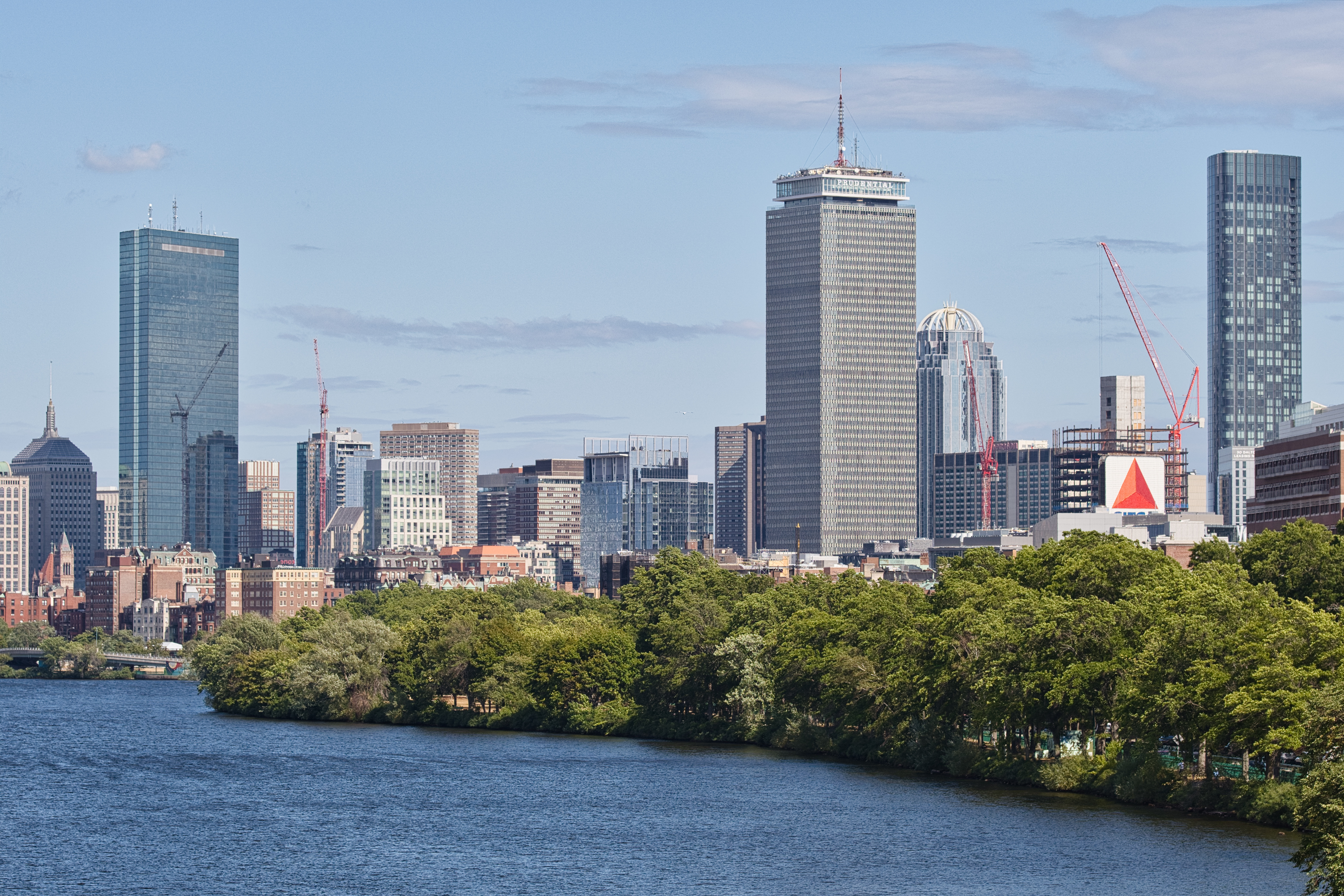
A view of the "High Spine" of skyscrapers in the Back Bay, including One Dalton, the Prudential Tower, and 200 Clarendon.
