= 500 Boylston Street =

Office building in Boston, Massachusetts

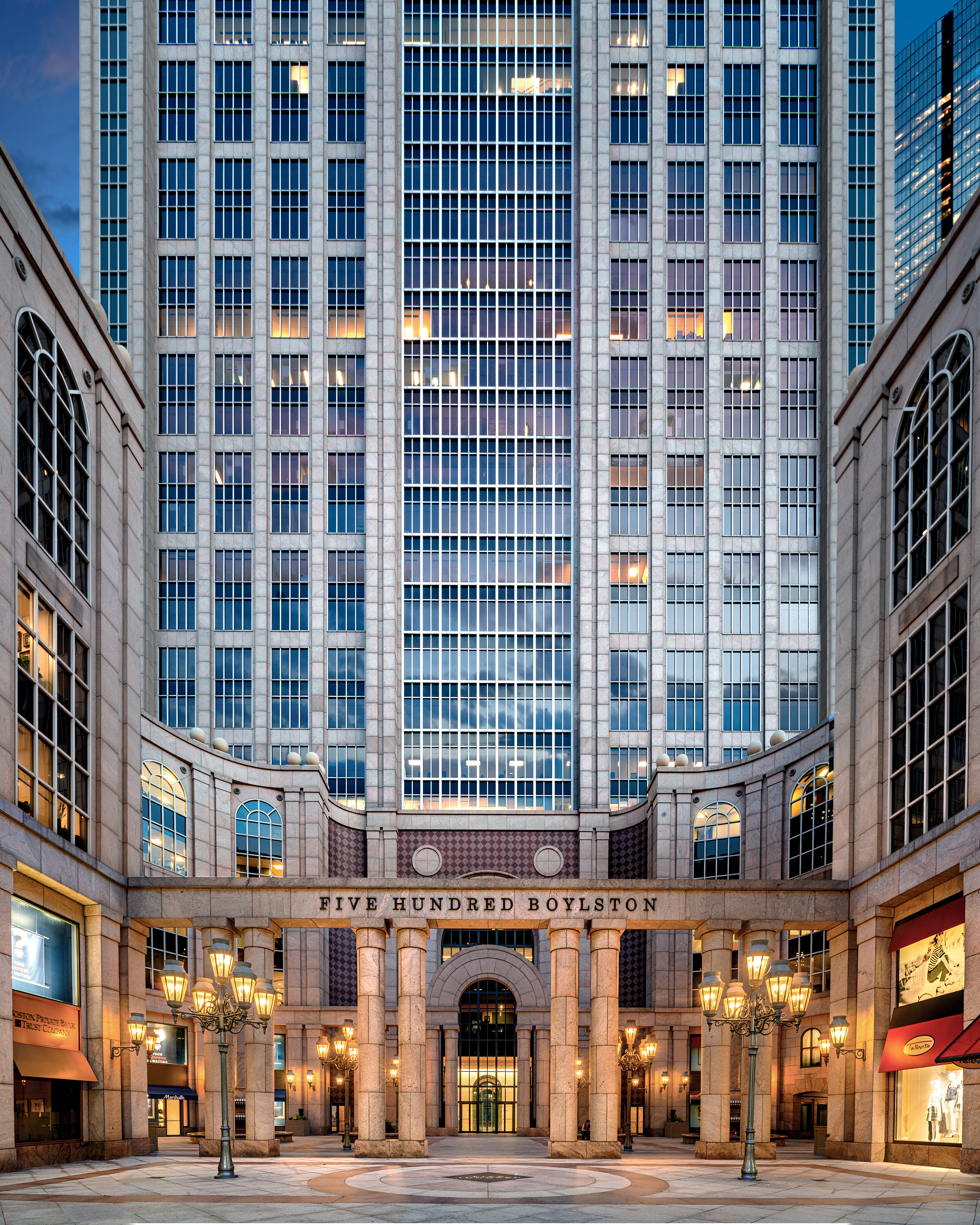
- The 500 Boylston Street building in Boston
- Interactive map of the 500 Boylston Street area

General information
- Type: Office
- Architectural style: Postmodern
- Location: 500 Boylston Street; Boston, Massachusetts, U.S.
- Coordinates: 42°21′02.67″N 71°04′27.76″W
- Completed: 1989

Height
- Roof: 328 feet (100 m)

Technical details
- Floor count: 25

Design and construction
- Architect: Johnson / Burgee Architects
- Developer: Hines Interests LP
- Structural engineer: LeMessurier Consultants; Cosentini Associates(MEP/FP)

500 Boylston Street is a 1.3-million square foot postmodern building located in the Back Bay section of Boston and part of the city's High Spine, completed in 1989. It is located next to the landmark Trinity Church, Boston. It dominates the western half of the city block bounded by Boylston, Clarendon and Berkeley streets and St. James Avenue. The building was designed by John Burgee Architects with Philip Johnson, with structural engineering by LeMessurier Consultants and MEP/FP engineering by Cosentini Associates, Inc. The construction project was managed by Bond Brothers. It cost $100 million to build. The site contains approximately 137,000 square feet (12,700 m^{2}) of land area, with approximately 500 feet (150 m) of frontage on Boylston Street.

The first six floors are retail and small office space. Above that there is a 19-story office tower with Class A office space. It has approximately 715,000 square feet (66,400 m^{2}) of office space. It has an underground parking lot for 1,000 cars that it shares with 222 Berkeley Street.

== Material ==
The structural design is made up of composite beams and girders supporting steel deck and concrete topping slab on a steel frame. The 25-story superstructure is founded on 6-foot (1.8 m) thick foundation mat bearing on clay. The 6-story low-rise is founded on spread footings, hold down piles (tension piles) and 24-inch (610 mm) pressure slab designed to resist a hydrostatic head of approximately 25 feet (7.6 m). The parking garage is made up of slurry wall construction.

The building's distinctive design includes carved rose granite cladding with two-story windows, a vaulted copper roof line, and strong exterior column detailing. The design, by John Burgee Architects with Philip Johnson as Design Consultant, also includes a main building entrance through a courtyard, framed on each side by two symmetrical wings, each faced with soaring columns.

== Awards ==
- Building Owners and Managers Association (BOMA) Building of the Year Award, 2005
- EPA's Sustained Excellence in Energy Management award, 2004
- Building Owners and Managers Association (BOMA) Building of the Year Award, 2001
- ENERGY STAR certification label, 2000
- Building Owners and Managers Association (BOMA) Building of the Year Award, 1996

== Television ==
500 Boylston Street is seen on the television show Boston Legal. The fictional law firm Crane, Poole & Schmidt's Boston office is located on the building's 14th, 15th and a fictional 28th floor due to the building only having 25 floors. There are also no balconies attached to these floors where Boston Legal was set.
