= Berkeley Building =

Office in Boston, Massachusetts, U.S.

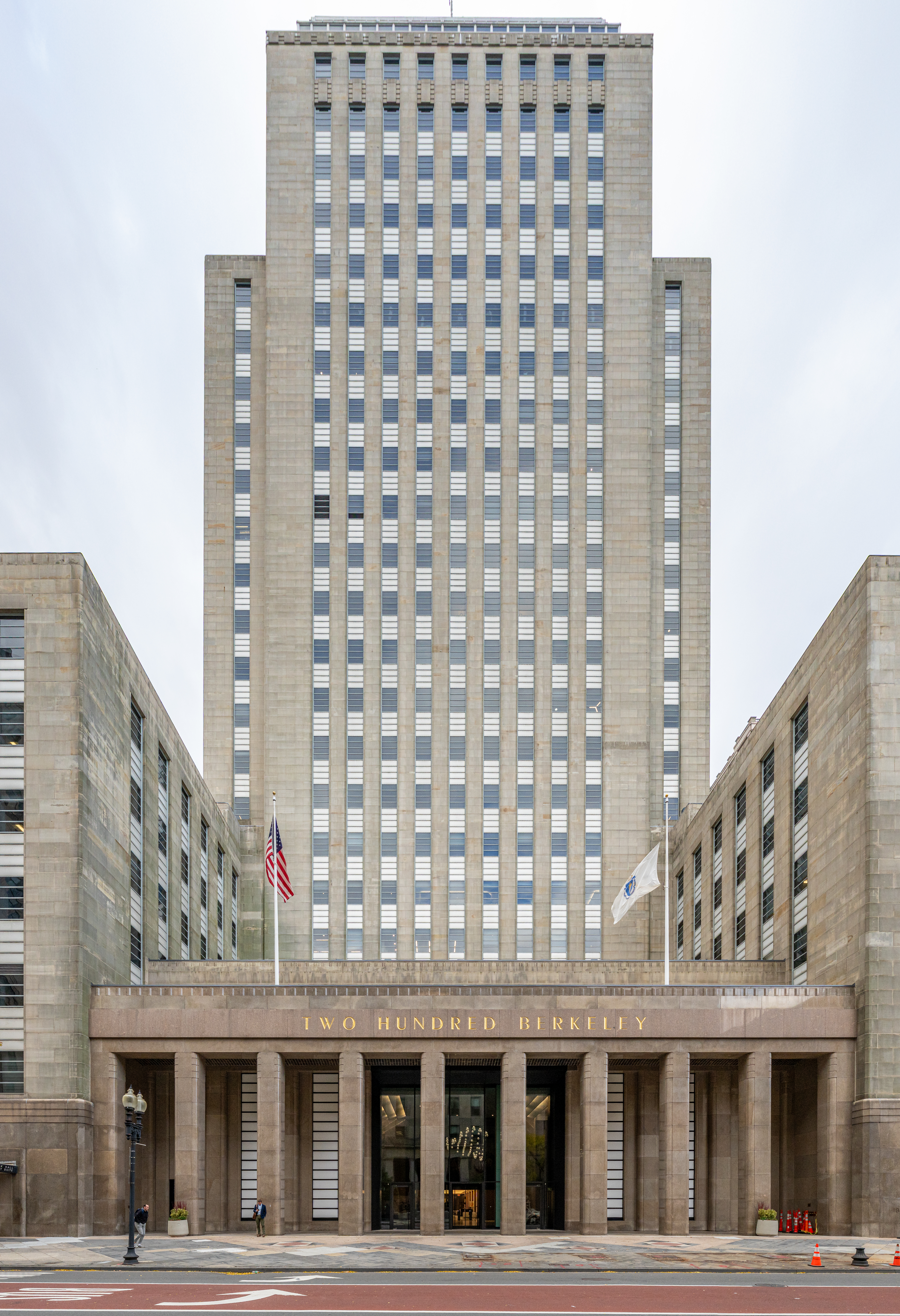

General information
- Type: Office
- Location: 200 Berkeley Street; Boston, Massachusetts, U.S.
- Coordinates: 42°20′59.78″N 71°04′21.55″W
- Completed: 1947

Height
- Roof: 495 ft (151 m)

Technical details
- Floor count: 26

Design and construction
- Architect: Cram and Ferguson
- Developer: Cram and Ferguson

The Berkeley Building (also known as the Old John Hancock Building) is a 26-story, 495-foot (151 m) building located at 200 Berkeley Street, Boston, Massachusetts, USA. It is the second of the three John Hancock buildings built in Boston; it was succeeded by the John Hancock Tower. The building is known for the weather beacon at its summit, which displays distinctive light patterns as weather forecasts. The Berkeley Building is tied for the 25th-tallest building in the city with the Hub on Causeway Residential Tower (Hub50House).

== History ==
The building, located in Boston's Back Bay, was designed by Boston's Cram and Ferguson and completed in 1947. The contractor was the city's Turner Construction, the building sheathed in Berea Sandstone from northeast Ohio. From 1947 until 1964 it was the second-tallest building in the city, one foot (30 cm) shorter than the 496-foot (151 m) Custom House Tower, but a much larger building and a conspicuous landmark. The Prudential Tower, completed in 1964, dwarfed both. As of 2004, 17 buildings are taller, yet it remains an easily recognized Boston landmark, familiar to commuters crossing the Charles River. A drawing of this building served as a logo for the John Hancock Insurance company for many years.

In March 2003, the John Hancock Insurance company sold the Berkeley Building, along with the Stephen L. Brown building and the John Hancock Tower, to Beacon Capital Partners. In December 2006, the Berkeley and Brown buildings were reacquired by John Hancock. As of 2004 the John Hancock company refers to it as "The Berkeley Building," but in common parlance it is "the Old John Hancock Building."

== Design and features ==
=== Observation Floor ===
In addition to regular offices, the top 26th floor also accommodated two observation areas looking out over the Boston skyline. Access was free to the public and a Reception and Information Desk was staffed during normal business hours.

=== Back Bay Events Center ===
It is also the home of the Back Bay Events Center: this two-part structure is the John Hancock Hall proper and the Dorothy Quincy Suite (a single room, capacity of approximately 900.) The Hall also contains a full box office and an 1100-seat auditorium. This is the annual site of the Massachusetts High School Drama Guild One-Act Festival's State Finals.

=== Weather beacon ===
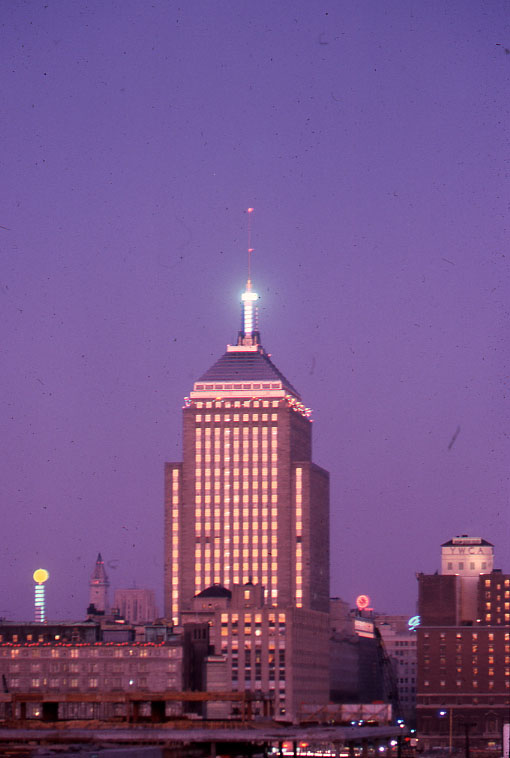
Weather beacon illuminated on top of the Berkeley Building

The building is topped by a weather beacon with red and blue lights, which use a code to present the local weather forecast, using a popular rhyme as a mnemonic:

Steady blue, clear view.
Flashing blue, clouds due.
Steady red, rain ahead.
Flashing red, snow instead.

During baseball season, flashing red means the Boston Red Sox game has been called off on account of weather.

The beacon was first lit on March 15, 1950 and was controlled using forecasts from a meteorological agency located on the 26th floor. It was kept lit until 1973 when it was shut off to set an example during an energy crisis which also temporarily shut off the famed Citgo sign in Kenmore Square. The beacon was re-lit in 1983 and has continued to display the weather forecast ever since.

In October 2004, the beacon flashed red and blue to commemorate the World Series victory of the Boston Red Sox. This was the first time the color scheme changed since the beacon was lit in 1950. A new line was added to the poem accordingly:

Flashing Blue and Red, The Curse of the Bambino is dead!

The beacon again flashed red and blue when the Red Sox won the 2007 World Series, as well as when they won the 2013 World Series. However, it did not flash red and blue the night they clinched the 2018 World Series.

== Gallery ==
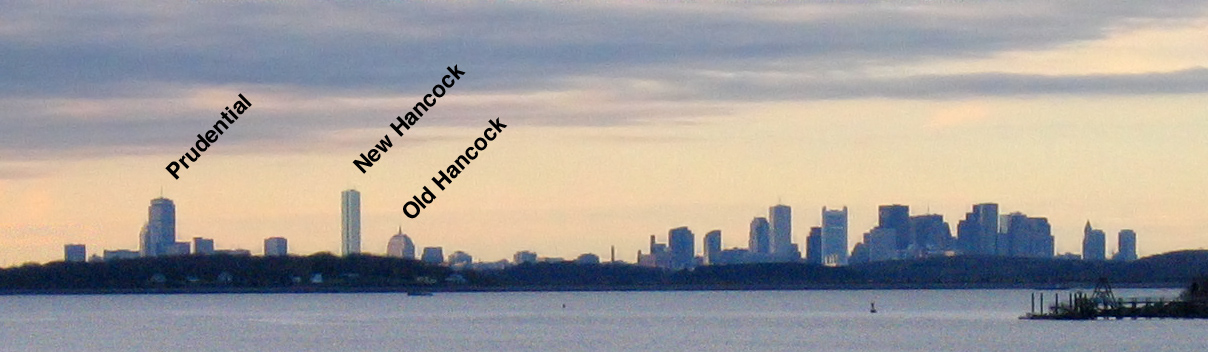
Though dwarfed by other buildings, the "old John Hancock" remains a conspicuous and recognizable element of the Boston skyline

== See also ==
- List of tallest buildings in Boston
- HDB/Cram and Ferguson
