= Back Bay, Boston =

Historic district in Boston, Massachusetts

Coordinates: 42°21′4.66″N 71°4′49.28″W

- Back Bay Historic District
- U.S. National Register of Historic Places
- U.S. Historic district
- Boston Landmark
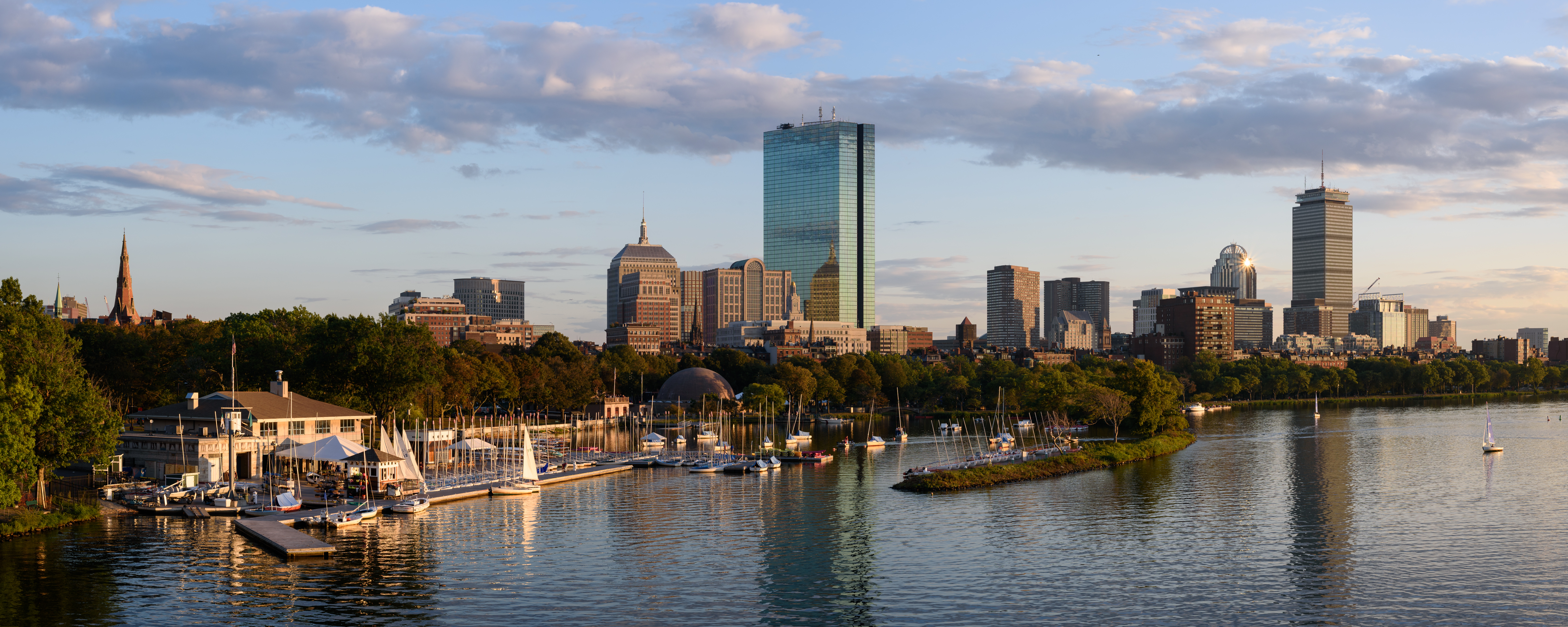
- Back Bay and the Charles River

- Location within Boston Location within Massachusetts Location within the United States
- Location: Boston, Massachusetts, U.S.
- Architect: Multiple
- Architectural style: Mid 19th Century Revival, Late 19th And 20th Century Revivals, Late Victorian
- NRHP reference No.: 73001948

Significant dates
- Added to NRHP: August 14, 1973
- Designated BOSL: 1966

Back Bay is an officially recognized historic neighborhood of Boston, Massachusetts, built on reclaimed land in the Charles River basin. Construction began in 1859, as the demand for luxury housing exceeded the availability in the city at the time, and the area was fully built by around 1900. It is most famous for its rows of Victorian brownstone homes—considered one of the best preserved examples of 19th-century urban design in the United States—as well as numerous architecturally significant individual buildings, and cultural institutions such as the Boston Public Library, and Boston Architectural College. Initially conceived as a residential-only area, commercial buildings were permitted from around 1890, and Back Bay now features many office buildings, including the John Hancock Tower, Boston's tallest skyscraper. It is also considered a fashionable shopping destination (especially Newbury and Boylston Streets, and the adjacent Prudential Center and Copley Place malls) and home to several major hotels.

The Neighborhood Association of the Back Bay considers the neighborhood's bounds to be "Charles River on the North; Arlington Street to Park Square on the East; Columbus Avenue to the New York New Haven and Hartford right-of-way (South of Stuart Street and Copley Place), Huntington Avenue, Dalton Street, and the Massachusetts Turnpike on the South; Charlesgate East on the West."

== History ==
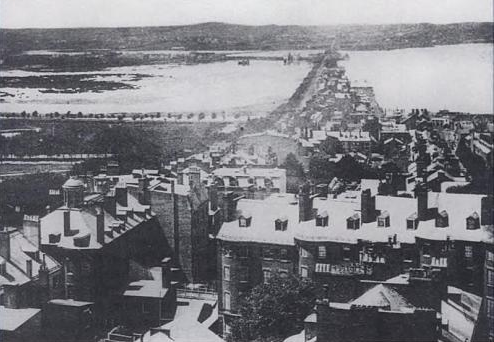
View (1858) from the State House dome westward along the Mill Dam (now Beacon Street), which separated Back Bay (left) from the Charles River. The Mill Dam and the Cross Dam (in distance, in modern Massachusetts Avenue-Kenmore Square area, with mills barely visible near juncture with the Mill Dam) were part of an attempt to derive mill power from river tides. Trees along north-south waterline represent western boundary (now Arlington Street) of the Boston Public Garden.

Before its transformation into buildable land by a 19th-century filling project, the Back Bay was a bay, west of the Shawmut Peninsula (on the far side from Boston Harbor) between Boston and Cambridge, the Charles River entering from the west. This bay was tidal: the water rose and fell several feet over the course of each day, and at low tide much of the bay's bed was exposed as a marshy flat. As early as 5,200 years before present, Native Americans built fish weirs here, evidence of which was discovered during subway construction in 1913 (see Ancient Fishweir Project and Boylston Street Fishweir).

In 1814, the Boston and Roxbury Mill Corporation was chartered to construct a milldam, which would also serve as a toll road connecting Boston to Watertown, bypassing Boston Neck. The dam prevented the natural tides from flushing sewage out to sea, creating severe sanitary and odor problems. With costs higher and power lower than expected, in the end, the project was an economic failure, and in 1857 a massive project was begun to "make land" by filling the area enclosed by the dam.

The firm of Goss and Munson extended railroad lines to quarries in Needham, Massachusetts, 9 miles (14 km) away; a 35-car train carrying gravel and other fill arrived every 45 minutes, day and night. When the Needham gravel pits were exhausted, additional fill was found in Canton, Dedham, Hyde Park, and Westwood. William Dean Howells recalled "the beginnings of Commonwealth Avenue, and the other streets of the Back Bay, laid out with their basements left hollowed in the made land, which the gravel trains were yet making out of the westward hills."

Present-day Back Bay itself was filled by 1882; the project reached existing land at what is now Kenmore Square in 1890, and was completed in 1900 in the area now known as the Back Bay Fens. Much of the old mill dam remains buried under present-day Beacon Street. The project was the largest of a number of land reclamation projects which, beginning in 1820, more than doubled the size of the original Shawmut Peninsula.

Completion of the Charles River Dam in 1910 converted the former Charles estuary into a freshwater basin; the Charles River Esplanade was constructed to allow residents to enjoy the view of the new lagoon. The Esplanade has since undergone several changes, including the construction of Storrow Drive.

== Roads ==
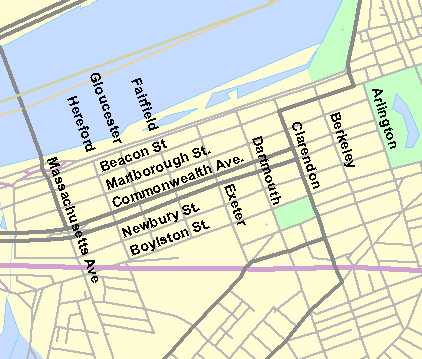
Principal streets of Back Bay

The Back Bay is traversed by five east–west corridors: Beacon Street, Marlborough Street, Commonwealth Avenue, Newbury Street and Boylston Street. These are interrupted at regular intervals by north–south streets named alphabetically: Arlington (along the western border of the Boston Public Garden), Berkeley, Clarendon, Dartmouth, Exeter, Fairfield, Gloucester and Hereford Streets. All of the west–east streets, except Commonwealth Avenue, are one-way streets.

In the 1960s, the "High Spine" design plan, in conjunction with development plans, gave way to the construction of high-rise buildings along the Massachusetts Turnpike, which in turn allowed the development of major projects in the area.

== Architecture ==
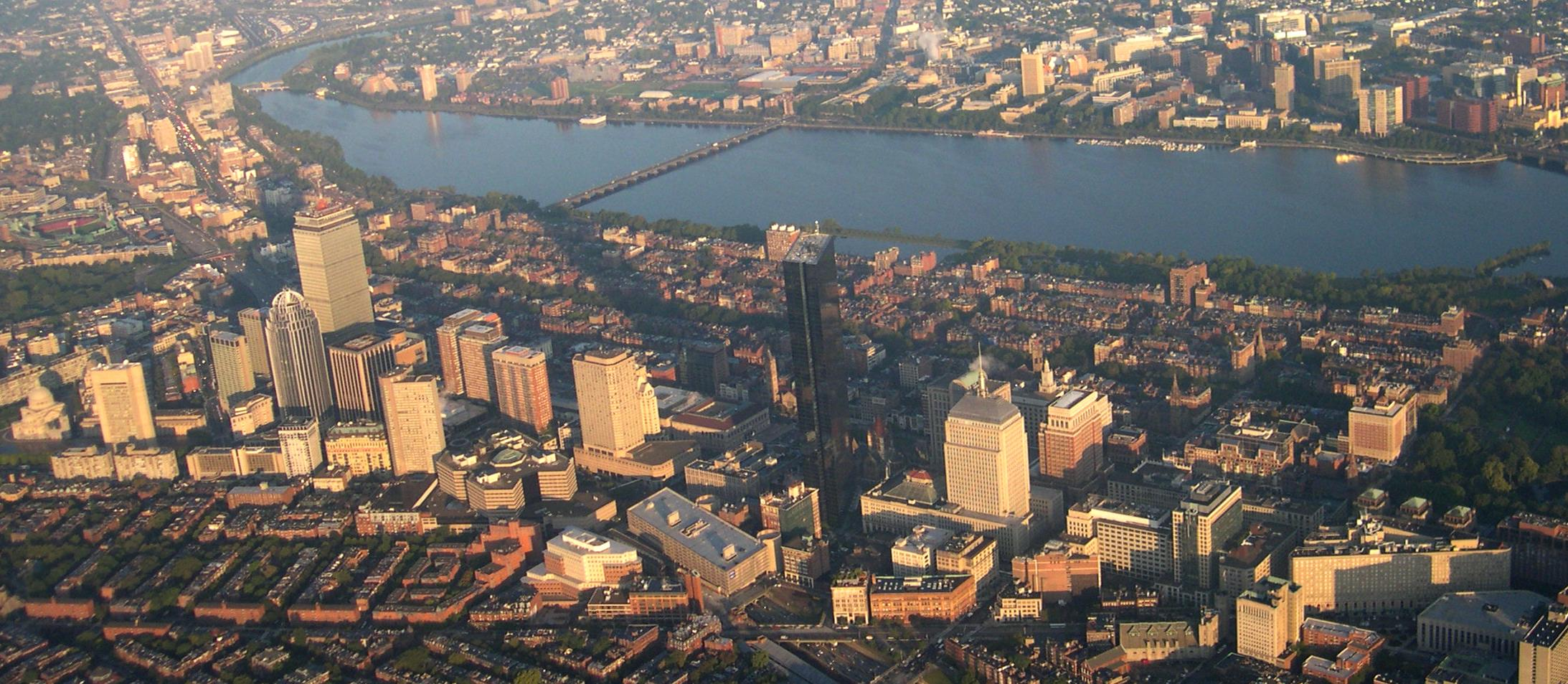
Back Bay's "High Spine" of skyscrapers, including the Prudential Center and John Hancock Tower

=== Building guidelines ===
The plan of Back Bay, by Arthur Gilman of the firm Gridley James Fox Bryant, was greatly influenced by Haussmann's renovation of Paris. It featured wide, parallel, tree-lined avenues unlike anything seen in other Boston neighborhoods. Five east–west corridors—Beacon Street (closest to the Charles), Marlborough Street, Commonwealth Avenue (actually two one-way thoroughfares flanking the tree-lined pedestrian Commonwealth Avenue Mall), Newbury Street and Boylston Street—are intersected at regular intervals by north–south cross streets: Arlington (along the western edge of the Public Garden), Berkeley, Clarendon, Dartmouth, Exeter, Fairfield, Gloucester, and Hereford. An 1874 guidebook noted the trisyllabic-disyllabic alternation of that alphabetic sequence; the series continues in the adjacent Fenway neighborhood with Ipswich, Jersey, and Kilmarnock Streets. West of Hereford are Massachusetts Avenue (a regional thoroughfare crossing the Harvard Bridge to Cambridge and far beyond) and Charlesgate, which forms the Back Bay's western boundary.

Setback requirements and other restrictions, written into the lot deeds of the newly filled Back Bay, produced harmonious rows of dignified three- to five-story residential brownstones (though most along Newbury Street are now in commercial or mixed use). The Back Bay is listed on the National Register of Historic Places, and is considered one of the best-preserved examples of 19th-century urban architecture in the United States. In 1966, the Massachusetts Legislature, "to safeguard the heritage of the city of Boston by preventing the despoliation" of the Back Bay, created the Back Bay Architectural District to regulate exterior changes to Back Bay buildings.

Since the 1960s, the concept of a High Spine has influenced large-project development in Boston, reinforced by zoning rules permitting high-rise construction along the axis of the Massachusetts Turnpike, including air rights siting of buildings.

=== Buildings around Copley Square ===
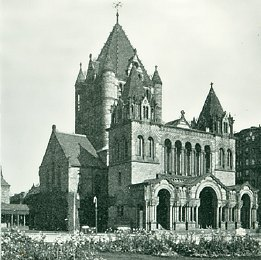
Trinity Church c. 1903

Copley Square features Trinity Church, the Boston Public Library, the John Hancock Tower, and numerous other notable buildings.

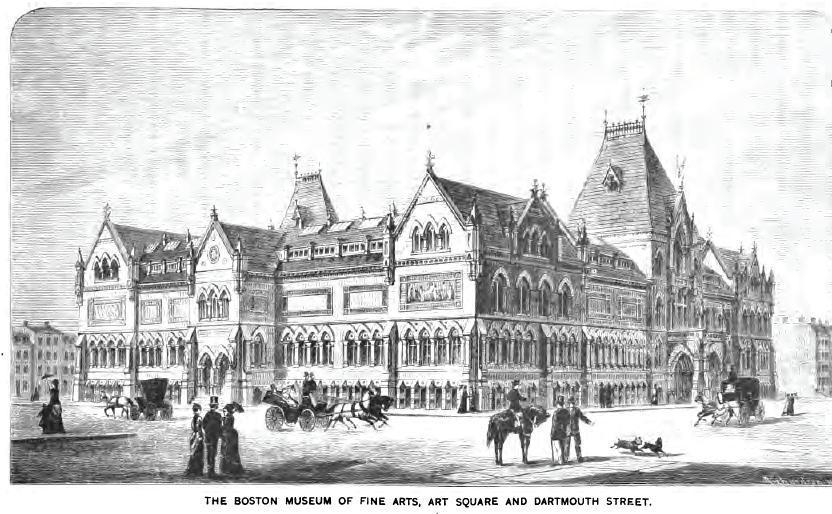
Original home of the Museum of Fine Arts

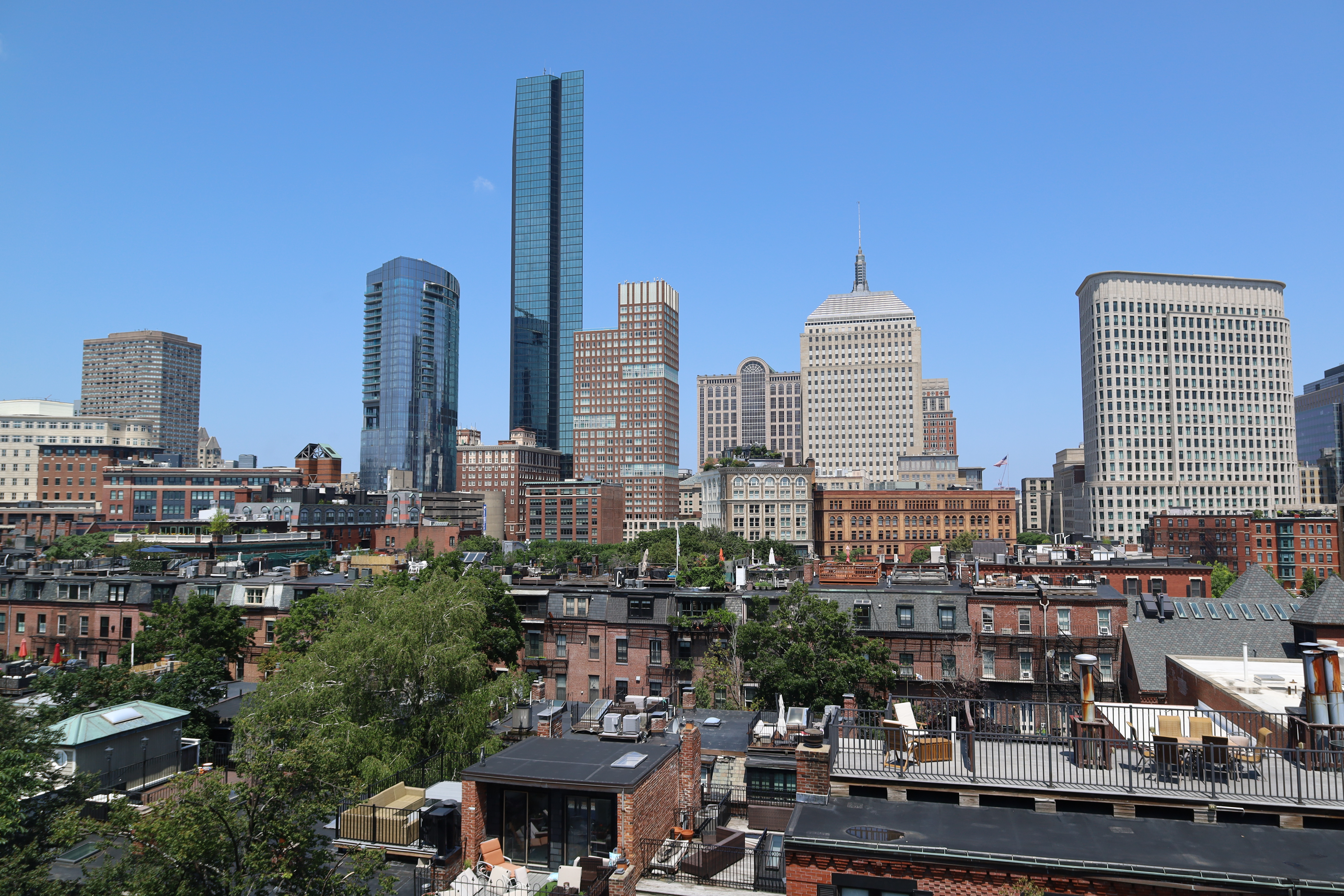
The Back Bay skyline from the south in 2023

- Trinity Church (1872–1877, H.H. Richardson), "deservedly regarded as one of the finest buildings in America."
- The first monumental structure in Copley Square was the original Museum of Fine Arts, begun 1870 and opened 1876. After the museum moved to the Fenway neighborhood in 1909 its red Gothic Revival building was demolished to make way for the Fairmont Copley Plaza Hotel (1912–present).
- The Boston Public Library (1888–1892), designed by McKim, Mead, and White, is a leading example of Beaux-Arts architecture in the US. Sited across Copley Square from Trinity Church, it was intended to be "a palace for the people." Baedeker's 1893 guide terms it "dignified and imposing, simple and scholarly," and "a worthy mate... to Trinity Church." At that time, its 600,000 volumes made it the largest free public library in the world.
- The Old South Church, also called the New Old South Church (645 Boylston Street on Copley Square), 1872–75, is located across the street from the Boston Public Library. It was designed by the Boston architectural firm of Cummings and Sears in the Venetian Gothic style. The style follows the precepts of the British cultural theorist and architectural critic John Ruskin (1819–1900) as outlined in his treatise The Stones of Venice. Old South Church remains a significant example of Ruskin's influence on architecture in the US. Charles Amos Cummings and Willard T. Sears also designed the Isabella Stewart Gardner Museum.
- There were at various times three different "Hancock buildings" in the Back Bay, culminating in a skyscraper flanking Trinity Church:
  - The Stephen L. Brown Building (Parker, Thomas & Rice, 1922) was the first of the three Hancock buildings:
  - The Old John Hancock Building (Cram and Ferguson, 1947) was the tallest building in Back Bay until construction of the Prudential Tower. (Sometimes called the Berkeley Building, though not to be confused with the actual Berkeley Building, below.)
  - The John Hancock Tower (I. M. Pei, 1972), New England's tallest building at 60 stories, is a dark-blue reflective glass tower with a footprint in the form of a narrow parallelogram. Admirers assert that it does not diminish the impact of Trinity Church; a critic said it "may be nihilistic, overbearing, even elegantly rude, but it's not dull."

=== Other prominent buildings ===
- The 52-story Prudential Tower, thought to be a marvel in 1964, is now considered ugly by some critics. Although the Prudential Tower has garnered scant architectural acclaim, the Prudential Center overall was awarded the Urban Land Institute's "Award for Best Mixed Use Property" in 2006.
- 111 Huntington Avenue (2002), a 36-story tower south of the Prudential Center, is Boston's eighth-tallest building. The building is crowned by an open dome frame and an enclosed "Wintergarden", and features a 1.2-acre (4,900 m^{2}) fully landscaped South Garden. It was nominated for the 2002 Emporis Skyscraper Award, and received third place "bronze".
- Arlington Street Church (Arthur Gilman, 1861), inspired by London's St Martin-in-the-Fields, was the first church built in the newly filled Back Bay. (Architect Gilman also designed Back Bay's grid-style street plan.)
- Berkeley Building (Constant-Désiré Despradelle, 1905) features a white terra cotta Beaux-Arts architecture facade on a steel frame.
- Boston Park Plaza (George B. Post, 1927), a prototype of the grand American hotel, it was the first hotel in the world to offer in-room radio in every room.
- Church of the Covenant (Richard M. Upjohn, 1865–1867) is a Presbyterian church of Roxbury puddingstone in Gothic Revival style, which its designer intended as "a high gothic edifice ... which no ordinary dwelling house would overtop."
- The Colonnade Hotel (1971), with its row of columns, delineates the "back side" of the Prudential Center complex.
- The First Church of Christ, Scientist (1894; extended 1904), the centerpiece of the Christian Science Plaza, which also features a reflecting pool.
- The Gibson House (1860), preserved very much as it was in the 19th century, is now a museum.
- The Mary Baker Eddy Library and Mapparium museum and Library
- The New England Life Building (now called the Newbry Building) occupies the site of the Massachusetts Institute of Technology's first home, the Rogers Building (1866–1939) by William G. Preston. On the same block (and also by Preston) is the original home of Boston Society of Natural History; the Society is now Boston's Museum of Science—located elsewhere—but the building remains, now in retail use.
- The Saint Clement Eucharistic Shrine (Arthur F. Gray, 1922), today a Roman Catholic church, was originally built for the Second Universalist Society.

== Cultural and educational institutions ==
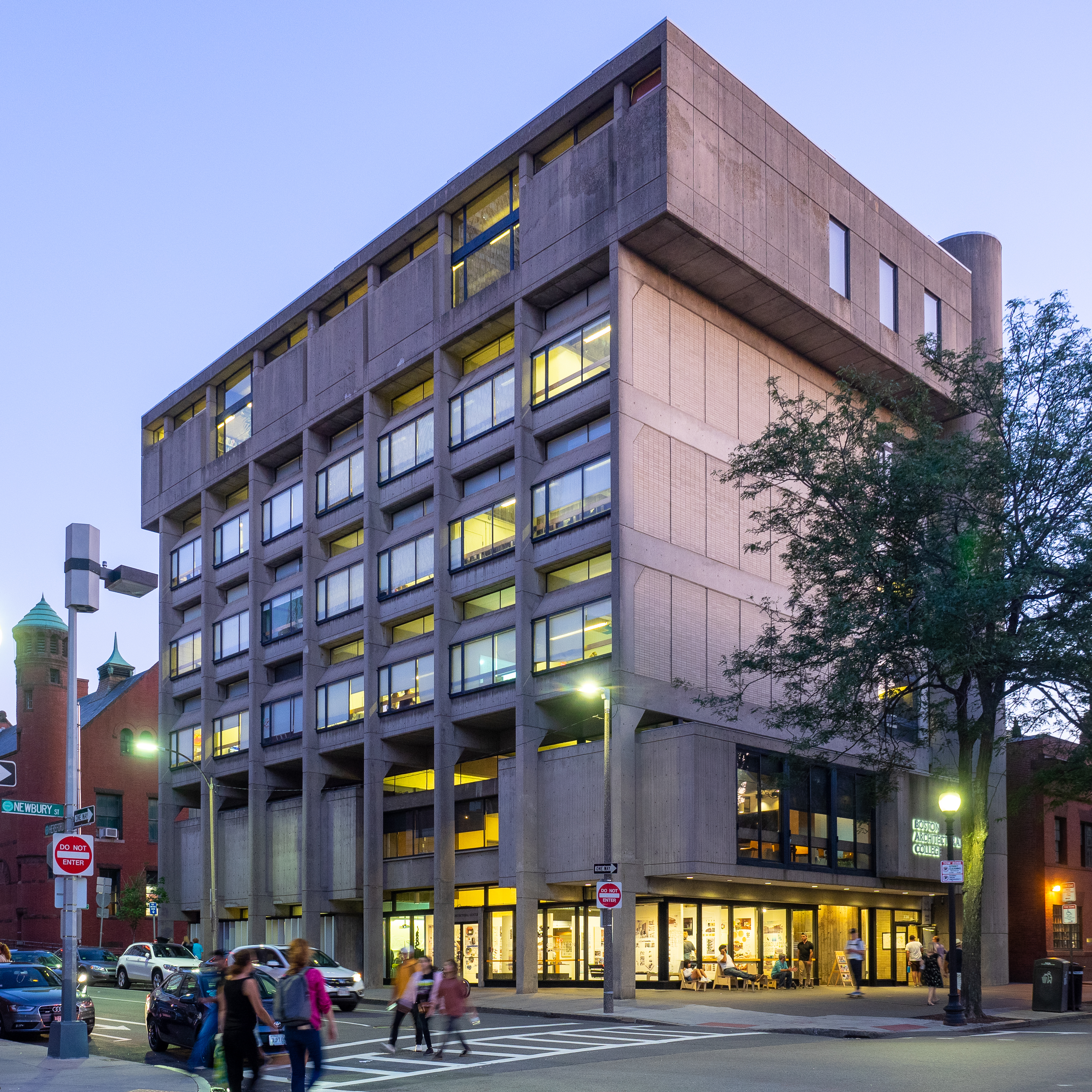
Main building of the Boston Architectural College

Prominent cultural and educational institutions in the Back Bay include:

- Alliance française, on Marlborough Street
- Berklee College of Music, which occupies a number of older and newly built Back Bay buildings
- Boston Architectural College, the oldest independent architecture school in the US
- Boston Conservatory, with buildings on Hemenway Street and The Fenway
- Fisher College, on Beacon Street
- Goethe Institute, on Newbury Street
- New England College of Optometry, the oldest optometry school in the US, located on Beacon Street
- New England Conservatory, on Huntington Avenue
- New England Historic Genealogical Society, whose archive and research center is at 99 Newbury Street

== Parkland ==
- The Back Bay Fens is a large picturesque park on Back Bay's south edge that forms part of Boston's Emerald Necklace.
- The Charles River Reservation runs between Storrow Drive and the Charles River at Back Bay's northern border.
- Commonwealth Avenue, which runs through the center of Back Bay, has a large center mall.
- Copley Square, named for painter John Singleton Copley, is a public square in southeast Back Bay.

== Transportation ==
Back Bay is served by the Green Line's Arlington, Copley, Hynes Convention Center, and Prudential stations, and the Orange Line's Back Bay station (which is also an MBTA Commuter Rail and Amtrak station).

== Demographics ==
=== Race ===
Back Bay/Fenway–Kenmore (02115) Racial Breakdown of Population (2017)
Race	Percentage of 02115 population	Percentage of Massachusetts population	Percentage of United States population	ZIP Code-to-State Difference	ZIP Code-to-USA Difference
White	67.2%	81.3%	76.6%	−14.1%	−9.4%
White (Non-Hispanic)	60.7%	72.1%	60.7%	−11.4%	+0.0%
Asian	15.1%	6.9%	5.8%	+8.2%	+9.3%
Hispanic	13.2%	11.9%	18.1%	+1.3%	−4.9%
Black	8.9%	8.8%	13.4%	+0.1%	−4.5%
Native Americans/Hawaiians	0.3%	0.6%	1.5%	−0.3%	−1.2%
Two or more races	3.5%	2.4%	2.7%	+1.1%	+0.8%

Back Bay/Bay Village (02116) Racial Breakdown of Population (2017)
Race	Percentage of 02116 population	Percentage of Massachusetts population	Percentage of United States population	ZIP Code-to-State Difference	ZIP Code-to-USA Difference
White	77.1%	81.3%	76.6%	−4.2%	+0.5%
White (Non-Hispanic)	70.9%	72.1%	60.7%	−1.2%	+10.2%
Asian	14.4%	6.9%	5.8%	+7.5%	+8.6%
Hispanic	7.5%	11.9%	18.1%	−4.4%	−10.6%
Black	4.9%	8.8%	13.4%	−3.9%	−8.5%
Native Americans/Hawaiians	0.2%	0.6%	1.5%	−0.4%	−1.3%
Two or more races	2.2%	2.4%	2.7%	−0.2%	−0.5%

=== Ancestry ===
According to the 2012–2016 American Community Survey 5-Year Estimates, the largest ancestry groups in ZIP Codes 02115 and 02116 are:

Ancestry	Percentage of 02115 population	Percentage of Massachusetts population	Percentage of United States population	ZIP Code-to-State Difference	ZIP Code-to-USA Difference
Irish	13.43%	21.16%	10.39%	−7.73%	+3.04%
Italian	10.57%	13.19%	5.39%	−2.61%	+5.18%
Chinese	7.82%	2.28%	1.24%	+5.54%	+6.58%
German	7.36%	6.00%	14.40%	+1.36%	−7.04%
English	4.89%	9.77%	7.67%	−4.88%	−2.77%
Polish	3.36%	4.67%	2.93%	−1.31%	+0.42%
Russian	3.20%	1.65%	0.88%	+1.55%	+2.33%
French	2.97%	6.82%	2.56%	−3.85%	+0.41%
Asian Indian	2.82%	1.39%	1.09%	+1.43%	+1.73%
Sub-Saharan African	2.67%	2.00%	1.01%	+0.67%	+1.66%
American	2.40%	4.26%	6.89%	−1.87%	−4.50%
Arab	2.12%	1.10%	0.59%	+1.02%	+1.53%
Mexican	2.00%	0.67%	11.96%	+1.33%	−9.96%
Puerto Rican	1.95%	4.52%	1.66%	−2.57%	+0.29%
French Canadian	1.79%	3.91%	0.65%	−2.12%	+1.13%
European	1.77%	1.08%	1.23%	+0.69%	+0.54%
Korean	1.39%	0.37%	0.45%	+0.67%	+0.89%
Scottish	1.16%	2.28%	1.71%	−1.12%	−0.55%
Greek	1.05%	1.22%	0.40%	−0.17%	+0.65%
Portuguese	1.05%	4.40%	0.43%	−3.35%	+0.62%
Swedish	1.05%	1.67%	1.23%	−0.62%	−0.18%

Ancestry	Percentage of 02116 population	Percentage of Massachusetts population	Percentage of United States population	ZIP Code-to-State Difference	ZIP Code-to-USA Difference
Irish	16.93%	21.16%	10.39%	−4.23%	+6.54%
Italian	10.58%	13.19%	5.39%	−2.61%	+5.19%
Chinese	10.16%	2.28%	1.24%	+7.88%	+8.92%
German	9.82%	6.00%	14.40%	+3.82%	−4.58%
English	9.39%	9.77%	7.67%	−0.39%	+1.72%
Polish	4.84%	4.67%	2.93%	+0.17%	+1.91%
Russian	4.18%	1.65%	0.88%	+2.53%	+3.30%
French	3.25%	6.82%	2.56%	−3.58%	+0.69%
Scottish	2.65%	2.28%	1.71%	+0.37%	+0.94%
American	2.46%	4.26%	6.89%	−1.80%	−4.43%
Puerto Rican	2.46%	4.52%	1.66%	−2.06%	+0.80%
European	2.08%	1.08%	1.23%	+1.00%	−0.85%
Sub-Saharan African	1.72%	2.00%	1.01%	−0.28%	+0.71%
Mexican	1.56%	0.67%	11.96%	+0.89%	−10.40%
Asian Indian	1.52%	1.39%	1.09%	+0.13%	+0.43%
Arab	1.48%	1.10%	0.59%	+0.38%	+0.89%
Swedish	1.39%	1.67%	1.23%	−0.28%	+0.16%
Cape Verdean	1.38%	0.97%	0.03%	+0.41%	+1.35%
French Canadian	1.35%	3.91%	0.65%	−2.55%	+0.70%
Greek	1.29%	1.22%	0.40%	+0.07%	+0.89%
Dutch	1.27%	0.62%	1.32%	+0.65%	−0.05%
Eastern European	1.16%	0.42%	0.17%	+0.74%	+0.99%
Scotch-Irish	1.09%	0.63%	0.96%	+0.46%	+0.13%
British	1.08%	0.48%	0.43%	+0.60%	+0.65%

== See also ==
- Copley Square
- High Spine
- National Register of Historic Places listings in northern Boston, Massachusetts

== Notes and references ==
=== References ===
- "Back Bay / Bay State Road" (PDF). City of Boston. 2017. Archived (PDF) from the original on July 2, 2019.

=== Further reading ===
- Anthony Mitchell Sammarco (1997). Boston's Back Bay. Images of America. Arcadia Publishing. OL 1657055W.
- Bacon, Edwin M. (1903) Boston: A Guide Book. Ginn and Company, Boston, 1903.
- Bunting, Bainbridge (1967) "Houses of Boston's Back Bay", Harvard University Press, ISBN 0-674-40901-9
- Fields, W.C.: "My Little Chickadee" (1940), in which the Fields character calls himself "one of the Back Bay Twillies."
- Jarzombek, Mark, Designing MIT: Bosworth's New Tech. Northeastern University Press, 2004. ISBN 1555536190.
- Howells, William Dean, Literary Friends and Acquaintance: My First Visit to New England
- Museum of Fine Arts, Boston. Back Bay Boston: The City as a Work of Art. With Essays by Lewis Mumford & Walter Muir Whitehill (Boston, 1969).
- Shand-Tucci, Douglass, Built in Boston: City and Suburb, 1800–2000.Amherst: University of Massachusetts Press, 1999. ISBN 1558492011.
- Train, Arthur (1921), "The Kid and the Camel," from By Advice of Counsel. ("William Montague Pepperill was a very intense young person...")
