= John Hancock Tower =

Skyscraper in Boston, Massachusetts

200 Clarendon Street

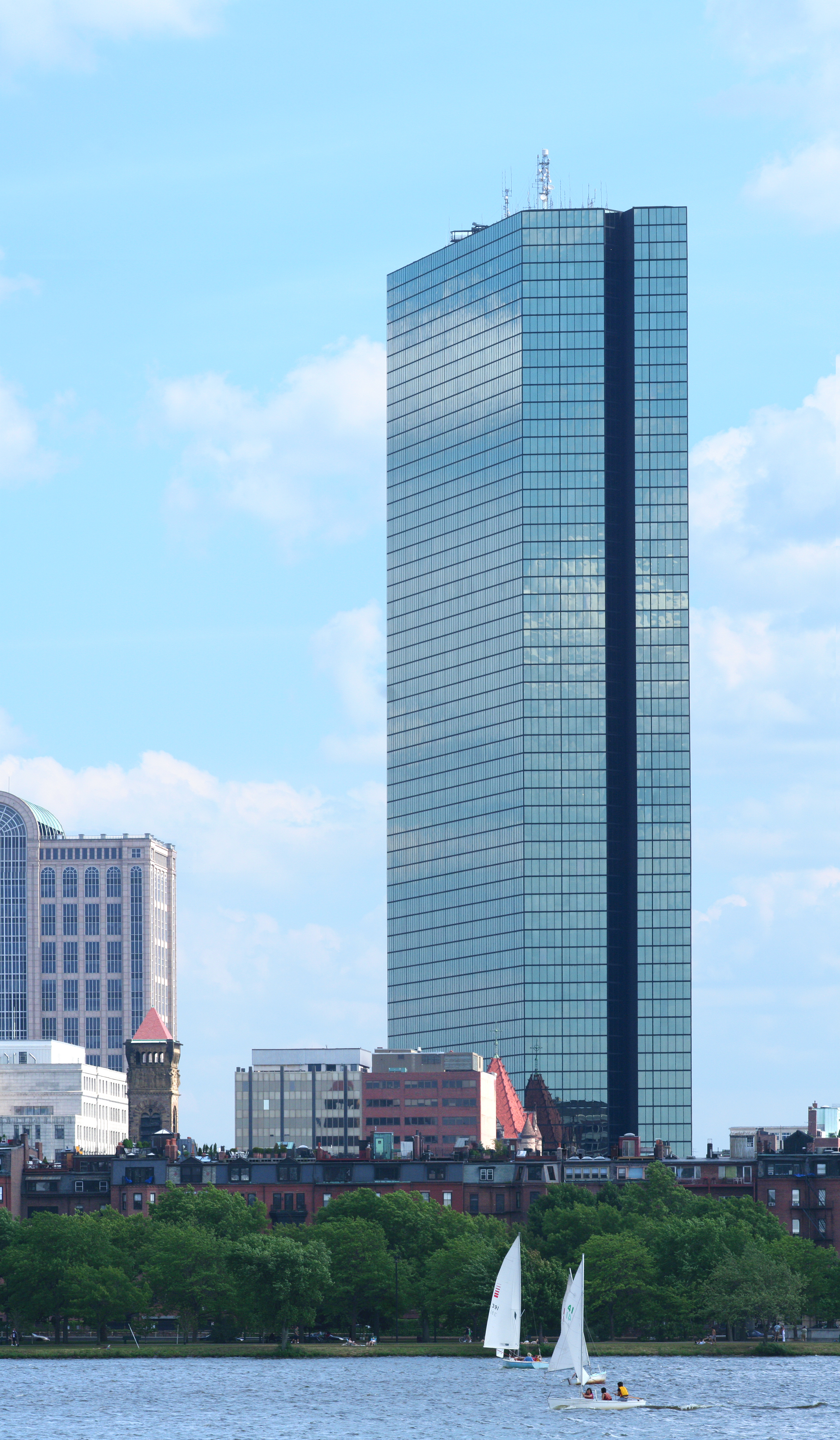
- A view of 200 Clarendon Street as seen from the Charles River, taken in 2007

- Location within Boston Location within Massachusetts Location within the United States

General information
- Type: Office
- Location: 200 Clarendon Street; Boston, Massachusetts; 02116
- Coordinates: 42°20′57.4″N 71°04′29.2″W
- Construction started: 1968
- Completed: 1976
- Owner: Boston Properties

Height
- Roof: 790 ft (240.8 m)

Technical details
- Floor count: 60
- Floor area: 2,059,997 ft^{2} (191,380.0 m^{2})

Design and construction
- Architects: Henry N. Cobb of I.M. Pei & Partners
- Developer: John Hancock Mutual Life Insurance Company
- Structural engineer: Cosentini Associates

Website
- 200clarendon.com

The John Hancock Tower, colloquially known as the Hancock, is a 60-story, 790-foot (240 m) skyscraper in the Back Bay neighborhood of downtown Boston, Massachusetts. The pinnacle height (including antennas) is 852 feet (260 m). Designed by Henry N. Cobb of the firm I. M. Pei & Partners, it was completed in 1976, and has held the title as the tallest building in New England ever since. In 2015, the lease belonging to the John Hancock Mutual Life Insurance Company, for which the skyscraper was named, expired, and it was renamed to its address at 200 Clarendon Street.

The building was initially widely known for its prominent structural flaws, including an analysis that the entire building could overturn under certain wind loads and a prominent design failure of its signature blue windows, which allowed any of the 500-pound (230 kg) window panes to detach and fall, up to the full height of the building, endangering pedestrians below.

The street address is 200 Clarendon Street, but occupants also use "Hancock Place" as a mailing address for offices in the building. John Hancock Insurance was the primary tenant of the building at opening, but the company announced in 2004 that some offices would relocate to a new building at 601 Congress Street, in Fort Point, Boston. The tower was originally named for the insurance company that occupied it, which in turn was named for John Hancock, a signatory of the United States Declaration of Independence.

== History ==
=== Development and engineering flaws ===
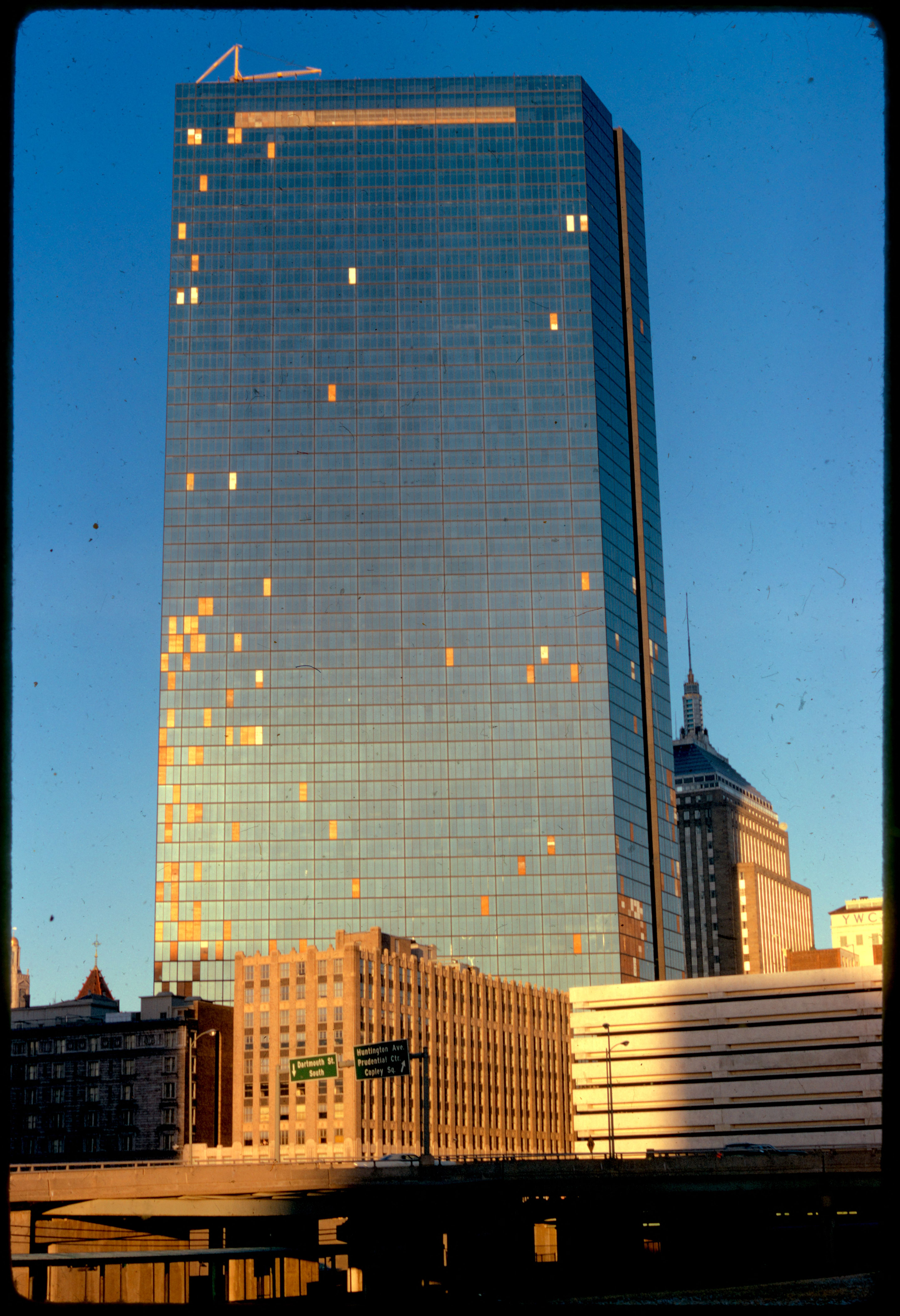
The tower during the time when windows that had fallen out were replaced with plywood

The building was a much-anticipated landmark designed by a well-respected architect, but was known in the 1970s as much for its engineering flaws as for its architectural achievement. The opening of the building was delayed from 1971 to 1976, and the total cost is rumored to have increased from $75 million to $175 million. It was an embarrassment for the firm, for modernist architects, and for the architecture industry.

During the excavation for the tower's foundation, temporary steel retaining walls were erected to create a space in which to build. The walls warped, giving way to the clay and mud fill of the Back Bay which they were supposed to hold back. The shifting soils damaged utility lines, the sidewalk pavement, and nearby buildings—including the historic Trinity Church across St. James Avenue. Trinity Church won an $11 million lawsuit to pay for repairs.

There were problems with the use of blue reflective glass in a steel tower: entire windowpanes, 4 ft × 11 ft (1.2 m × 3.4 m) and 500 lb (230 kg), detached from the building and crashed to the sidewalk hundreds of feet below. Police closed off surrounding streets whenever winds reached 45 mph (72 km/h). Under the direction of Frank H. Durgin of MIT's Wright Brothers Wind Tunnel, a scale model of the entire Back Bay and an aeroelastic model of the John Hancock Tower were built and tested in the wind tunnel to identify the problem. The research raised questions about the structural integrity of the entire building (due to unanticipated twisting of the structure), but did not account for the loss of the glass panels. An independent laboratory eventually confirmed that the failure of the glass was due to oscillations and repeated thermal stresses caused by the expansion and contraction of the air between the inner and outer glass panels which formed each window; the resilient bonding between the inner glass, reflective material, and outer glass was so stiff that it was transmitting the force to the outer glass (instead of absorbing it), thus causing the glass to fail.

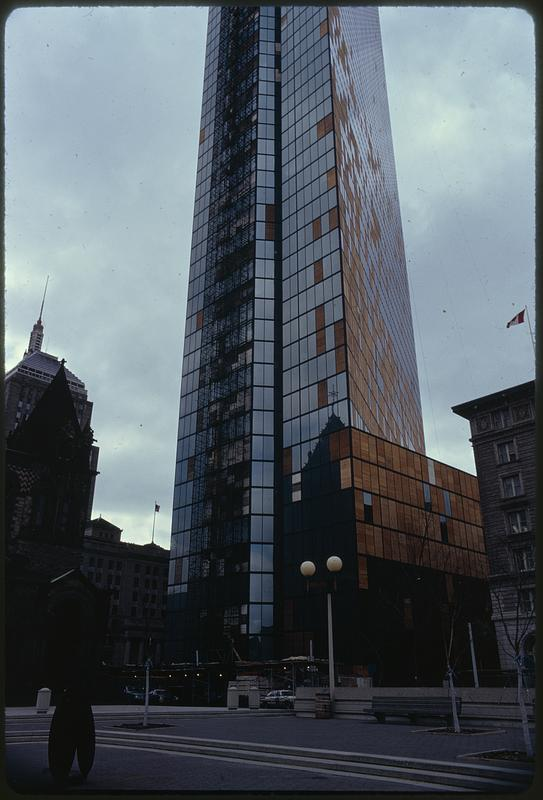
Another view of the tower's damage, showing it at street level

In October 1973, I.M. Pei & Partners announced that all 10,344 window panes would each be replaced by single-paned, heat-treated panels at a total cost between $5 million and $7 million. Approximately 5,000 of the original glass panes were removed intact, and were later offered for re-use by artists. Glass panes were sold to Hingham-based discount retailer Building #19, who sold them for $100 apiece. They advertised "If it does fall out, we promise to sell you the replacement plywood very cheap."

It took many months to diagnose problems and repair the building. Sheets of plywood replaced many of the missing glass windows of the building, earning the tower the nicknames "Plywood Ranch" (the same name as a local lumber yard chain at the time) and "Plywood Palace", much to the consternation of the vice president in charge of construction. According to engineers Matthys Levy and Mario Salvadori, the replacement also inspired jokes that the Hancock Tower was the "world's tallest wooden building."

The building's upper-floor occupants suffered from motion sickness when the building swayed in the wind. To reduce the movement, contractors installed a tuned mass damper on the 58th floor. As described by Robert Campbell, architecture critic for The Boston Globe:

Two 300-ton weights sit at opposite ends of the 58th floor of the Hancock. Each weight is a box of steel, filled with lead, 17 feet square by 3 feet high. Each weight rests on a steel plate. The plate is covered with lubricant so the weight is free to slide. But the weight is attached to the steel frame of the building by means of springs and shock absorbers. When the Hancock sways, the weight tends to remain still, allowing the floor to slide underneath it. Then, as the springs and shocks take hold, they begin to tug the building back. The effect is like that of a gyroscope, stabilizing the tower. The reason there are two weights, instead of one, is so they can tug in opposite directions when the building twists. The cost of the damper was $3 million. The dampers are free to move a few feet relative to the floor.

According to Campbell, engineers discovered that—despite the mass damper—the building could have fallen over under a certain kind of wind loading. The structure was assessed as more unstable on its narrow sides than on the big flat sides. Some 1,500 tons of diagonal steel bracing, costing $5 million, were added to prevent such an event.

=== Sale ===
In 2006, Broadway Partners acquired Hancock Place for $1.3 billion. By 2009, they had defaulted on the loans they used to buy the building, and it fell into foreclosure. On March 30, 2009, Hancock Place was sold at auction for $660 million ($20 million was new equity and the $640 million of in-place debt was assumed by the buyer) to a consortium of Normandy Real Estate Partners and Five Mile Capital Partners. The companies had been slowly increasing their investment over the previous months. In October 2010, Boston Properties acquired the John Hancock Tower for $930 million. As part of the purchase agreement, the name "Hancock Tower" would expire along with John Hancock's lease in 2015.

The company that built the Hancock Tower and two earlier, similarly named buildings is known loosely as "John Hancock Insurance", or simply "John Hancock". It was known as "The John Hancock Life Insurance Company" in the 1930s and "The John Hancock Mutual Life Insurance Company" in the 1940s. As of 2000, the company owning the buildings was "John Hancock Financial Services, Inc." with various subsidiaries such as "The John Hancock Variable Life Insurance Company" and "Signator Investors, Inc." In 2003, Manulife Financial Corporation of Toronto acquired the company, but it still uses the name "John Hancock Financial Services, Inc." and those of various subsidiaries.

The name change from "John Hancock" to "200 Clarendon" took place in mid-2015, when the Hancock's lease expired. It had been stipulated in the leasing contract that the building would retain the name "John Hancock" only so long as John Hancock Financial was an occupant.

== Architecture ==
Minimalism was the design principle behind the tower. The largest possible panes of glass were used, there are no spandrel panels, and the mullions are minimal. Cobb added a geometric modernist twist by using a parallelogram shape for the tower floor plan. From the most-common views, this design makes the corners of the tower appear very sharp. The highly reflective window glass is tinted slightly blue, which results in the tower having only a subtle contrast with the sky on a clear day. As a final modernist touch, the short sides of the parallelogram are each marked with a deep vertical notch, breaking up the tower's mass and emphasizing its verticality. In late evening, the vertical notch to the northwest catches the last light of the sky, while the larger portions of glass reflect the darkening sky.

A major concern of the architects while designing the tower was its proximity to Boston's Trinity Church, a prominent National Historic Landmark. Their concern led them to redesign the tower's plans, as there was a public outcry when it was revealed that the Hancock Tower would cast its shadow on the church.

Visual aspects

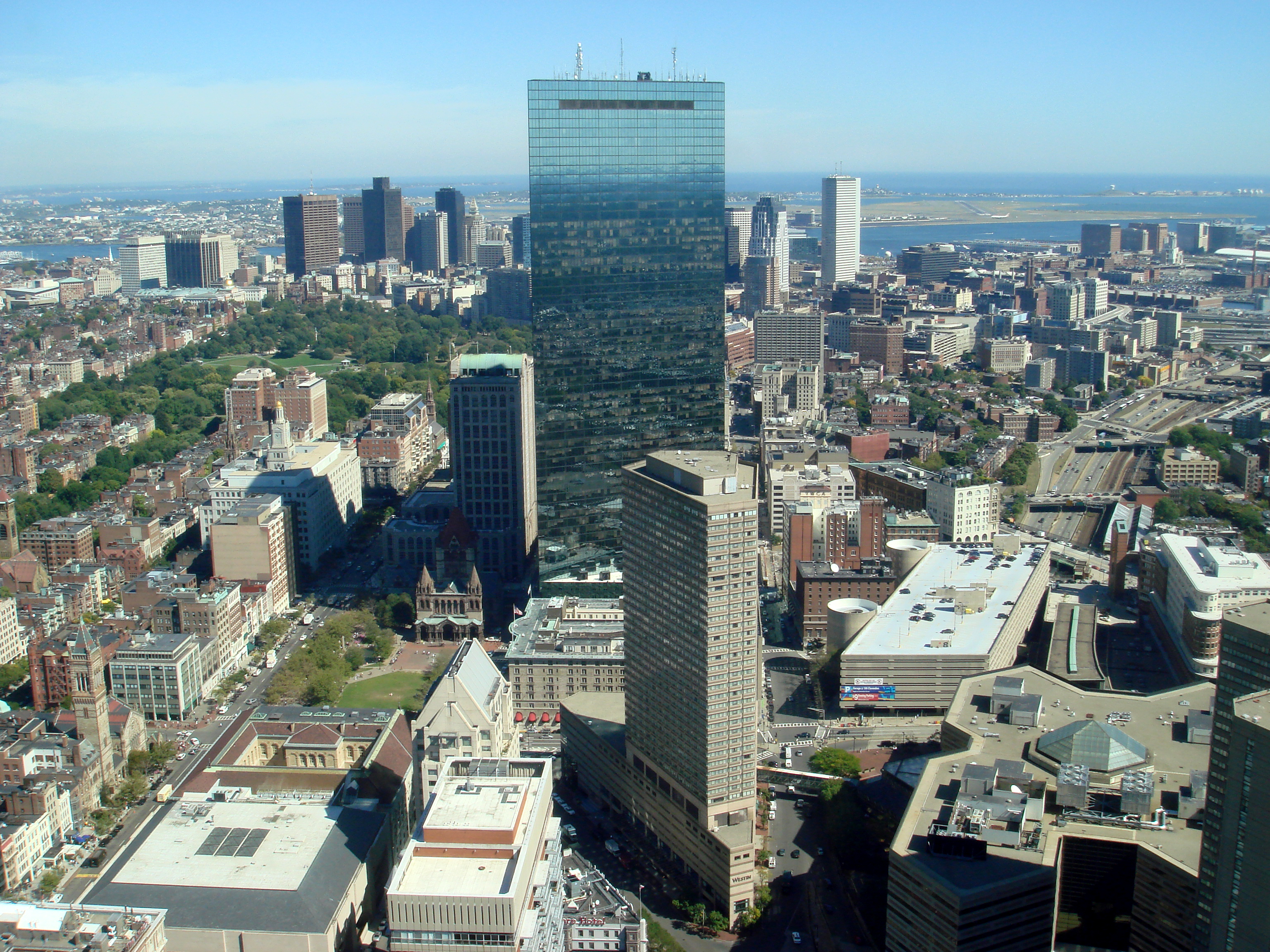
The John Hancock Tower seen from the Prudential Tower in 2007, showing its rectangular side.

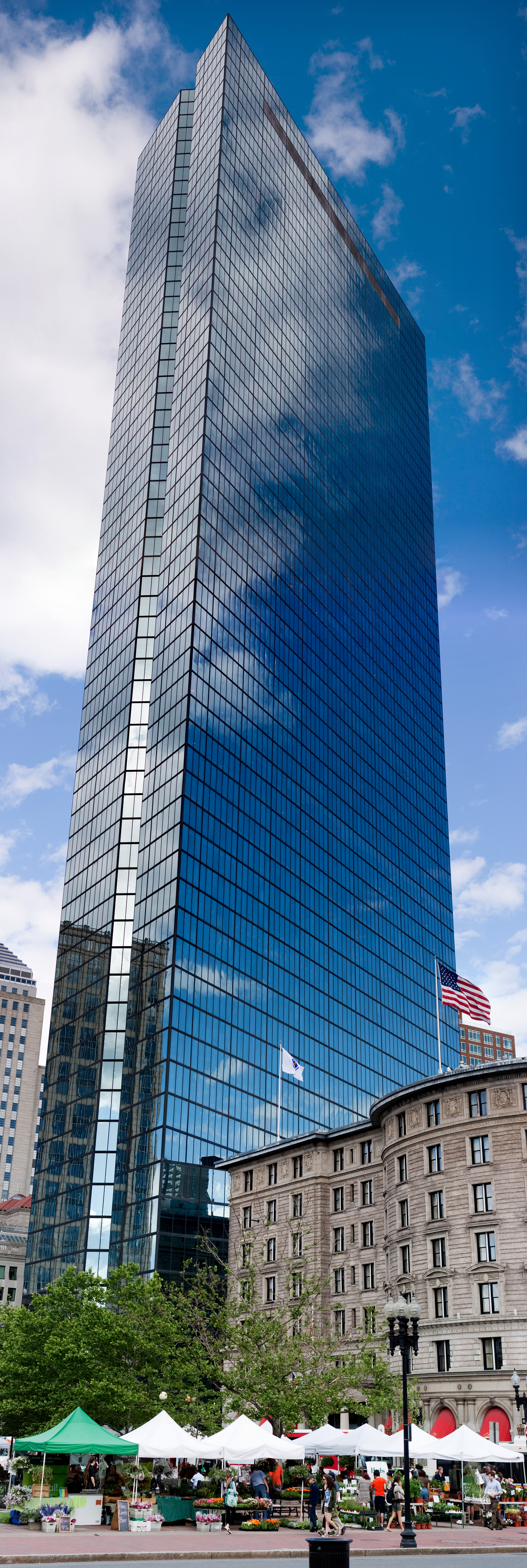
Full vertical view of the John Hancock Tower

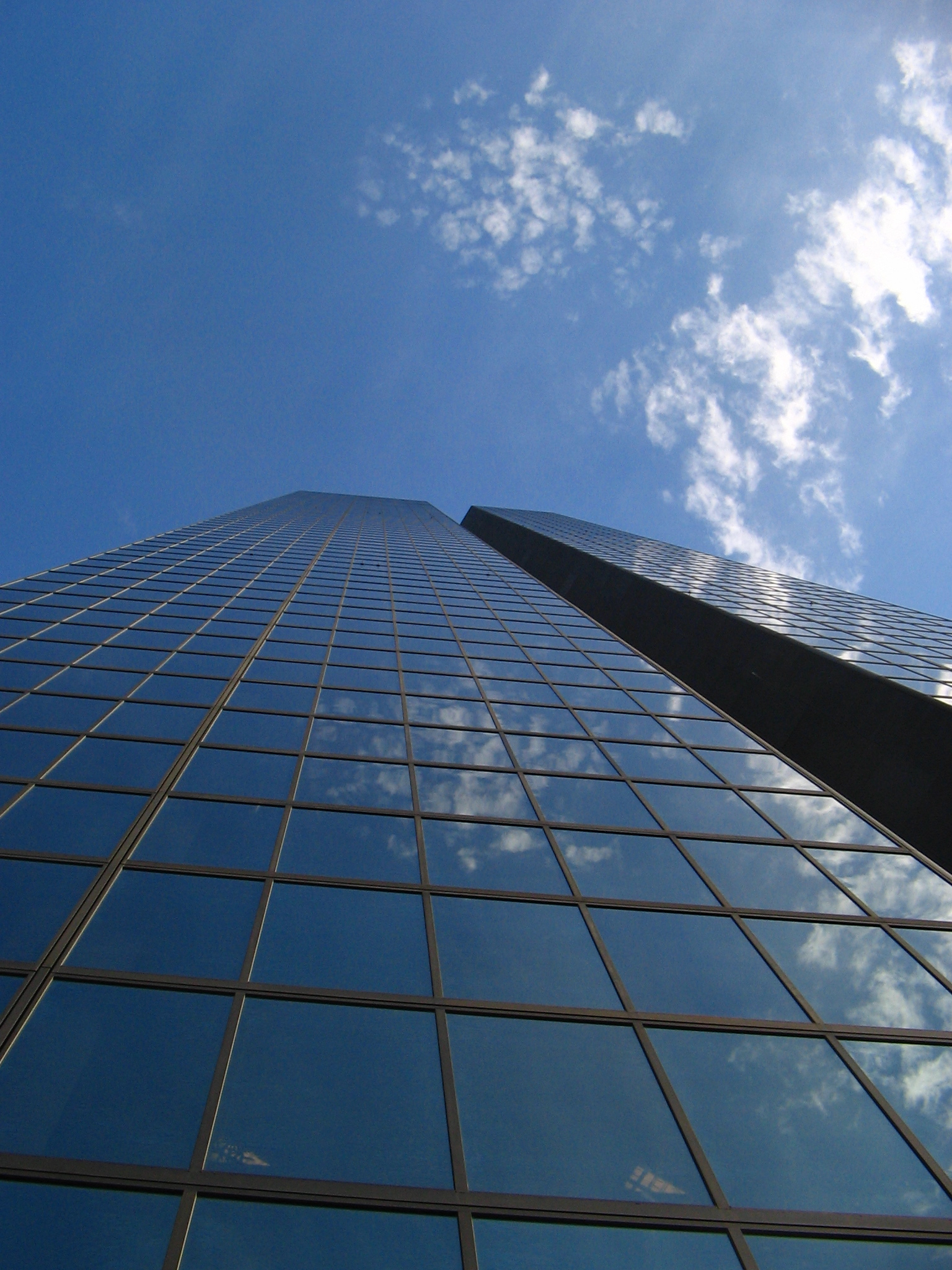
Cloud reflections on the glass sheathing

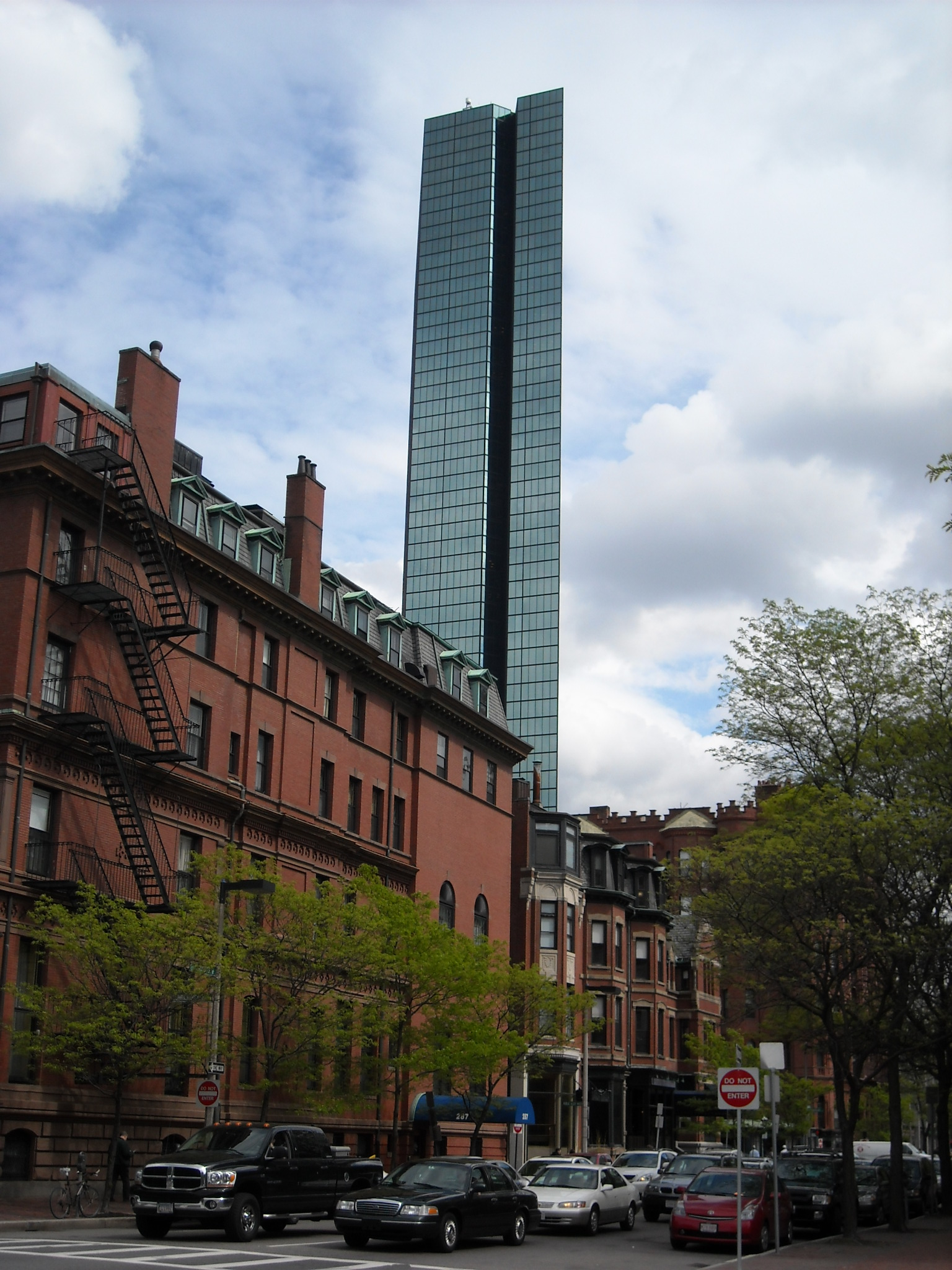
The dark vertical notch is prominent in this view.

In 1977, the American Institute of Architects presented the firm with a National Honor Award for the building, and in 2011 conferred on it the Twenty-five Year Award.

=== Observation deck ===
An observation deck at the top of the tower was a tourist attraction for several decades. However, it was closed after the September 11, 2001, terrorist attacks. After the closure of the John Hancock Tower's observation deck, the building with the highest observation deck open to the public in Boston became the Prudential Tower. The building's owners cited security as the reason for the closure in the years following. They rented the deck for private functions and expressed intent to replace it with more office space. Boston city officials contended that security concerns were moot, since most similar attractions had long since reopened. In addition, they claimed that a public observation deck was a requirement for the original building permits to gain public benefit from the high tower. However, officials have not been able to locate the documentation of this requirement.

== In popular culture ==
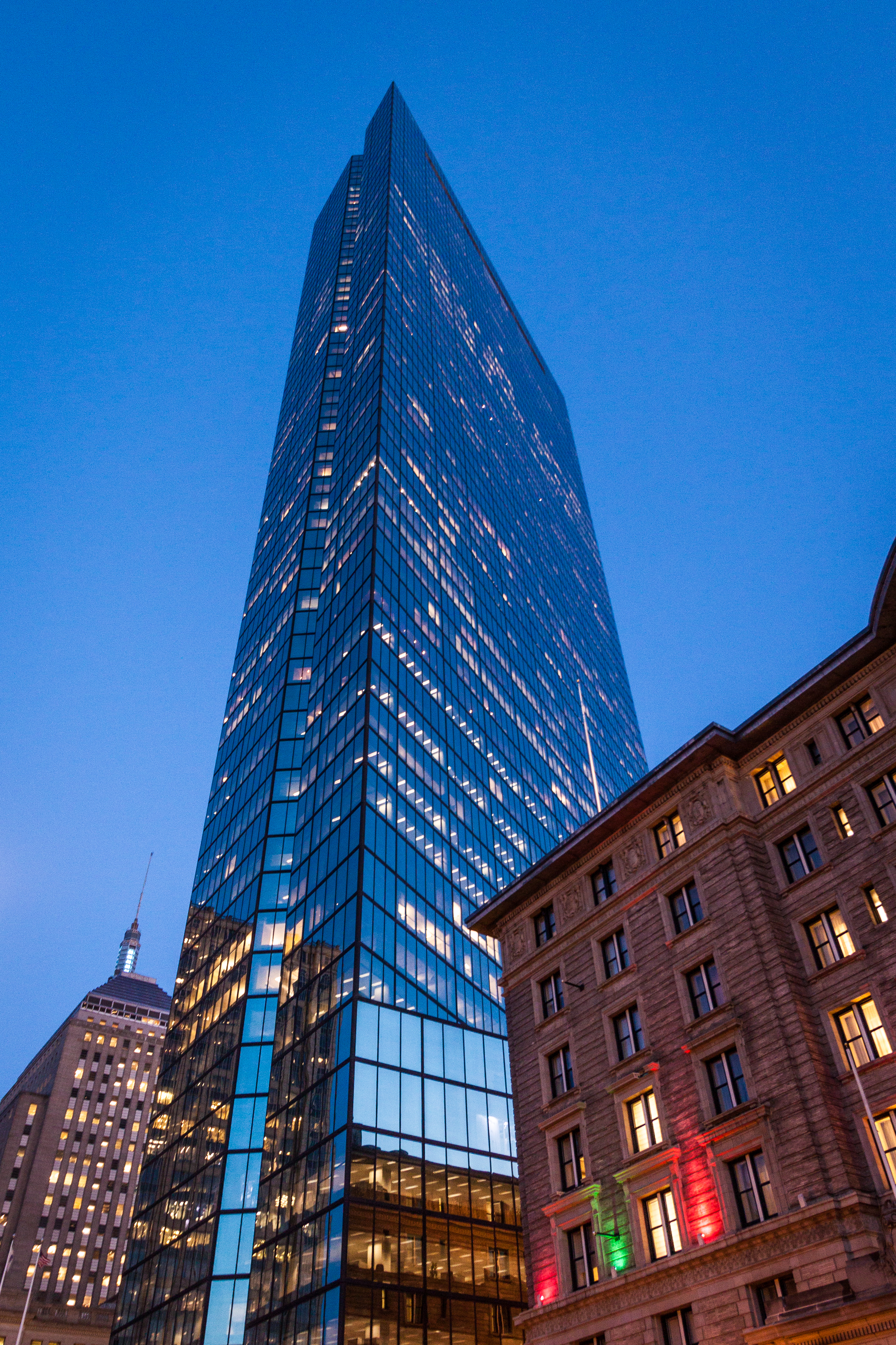
View of the John Hancock Tower during a blue hour

About a year after the falling windows problem was resolved, American novelist John Updike wrote in a story,

Now I am aware of loving only the Hancock Tower, which has had its missing pane restored and is again perfect, unoccupied, changeably blue, taking upon itself the insubstantial shapes of clouds, their porcelain gauze, their adamant dreaming. I reflect that all art, all beauty, is reflection.

The TV series Fringe shows the building as the location of FBI Headquarters. At the time, the actual FBI Boston headquarters was located at One Center Plaza.

In September 2015, the French photographer and artist JR created a 150-by-86-foot (46 by 26 m) tall mural of a man wearing shorts, between the 44th and 50th floors of the building. According to the property manager, the mural was the final piece in a three-part series of temporary public art projects at the building.

== See also ==
- John Hancock, for whom John Hancock Insurance was named
- Prudential Tower for an image of the Boston skyline from Cambridge in 1963, with the old 26-story Hancock building a conspicuous landmark.
- List of tallest buildings by U.S. state
- List of tallest buildings in Boston

Preceded by Prudential Tower	Tallest Building in Boston; 1976–present 241 m	Succeeded by None
