= 101 Clarendon Street =

- Interactive map of the 101 Clarendon Street area

General information
- Status: Never built
- Type: Hotel, Parking garage, Residential, Retail, Fitness center
- Location: 101 Clarendon Street, Boston, Massachusetts
- Coordinates: 42°20′54.69″N 71°4′26.46″W

Height
- Roof: 420 ft (130 m)

Technical details
- Floor count: 35

Design and construction
- Architect: Childs Bertman Tseckares Inc.
- Developer: Winn Development

101 Clarendon Street, also known as Columbus Center, was a proposed skyscraper planned for Boston, Massachusetts. If completed, it would have stood as the 25th-tallest building in Boston. Continuing on the trend established by the Prudential Tower in 1964, the completed building would have concealed more of the Massachusetts Turnpike (I-90) by utilizing air rights above it. The location would have been above the turnpike, directly to the east of Back Bay station and south of Copley Square in the Back Bay neighborhood of Boston. The project would have "united the city’s Back Bay and South End neighborhoods."

The project was put on what was then a temporary hiatus in March 2008 with the developers citing a need for about $35 million in state funds and loans, some of which had been denied because construction had stopped.

In 2010, the main financial investor in Columbus Center, the California Pension and Retirement System (CalPERS), began to extricate itself from the development. Citing the economic unfeasibility of such a project and the intransigence of locals opposing the project, the $800 million complex was eventually declared defunct by CalPERS and investor Arthur Winn. Debates over the final cost of cleaning up the proposed site (estimated at $5–6 million) continue.

Winn was later charged with making illegal campaign contributions totaling $61,000 over the course of eight years in an attempt to win approval and support for the Columbus Center project. He pleaded guilty to two misdemeanor counts of donating in another person's name to U.S. Representatives Stephen Lynch and Mike Capuano.

As of 2016 there are two developers in favor of reviving the project.

== See also ==
- List of tallest buildings in Boston
