= Jenga Tower =

A Jenga tower is a structure built with wooden blocks in the game of Jenga.

"Jenga Tower" may also be used to refer to buildings that resemble the structure built in the game, including:

- 56 Leonard Street
- The Independent (Austin, Texas)
- Duan Family Center for Computing & Data Sciences
