= One Devonshire Place =

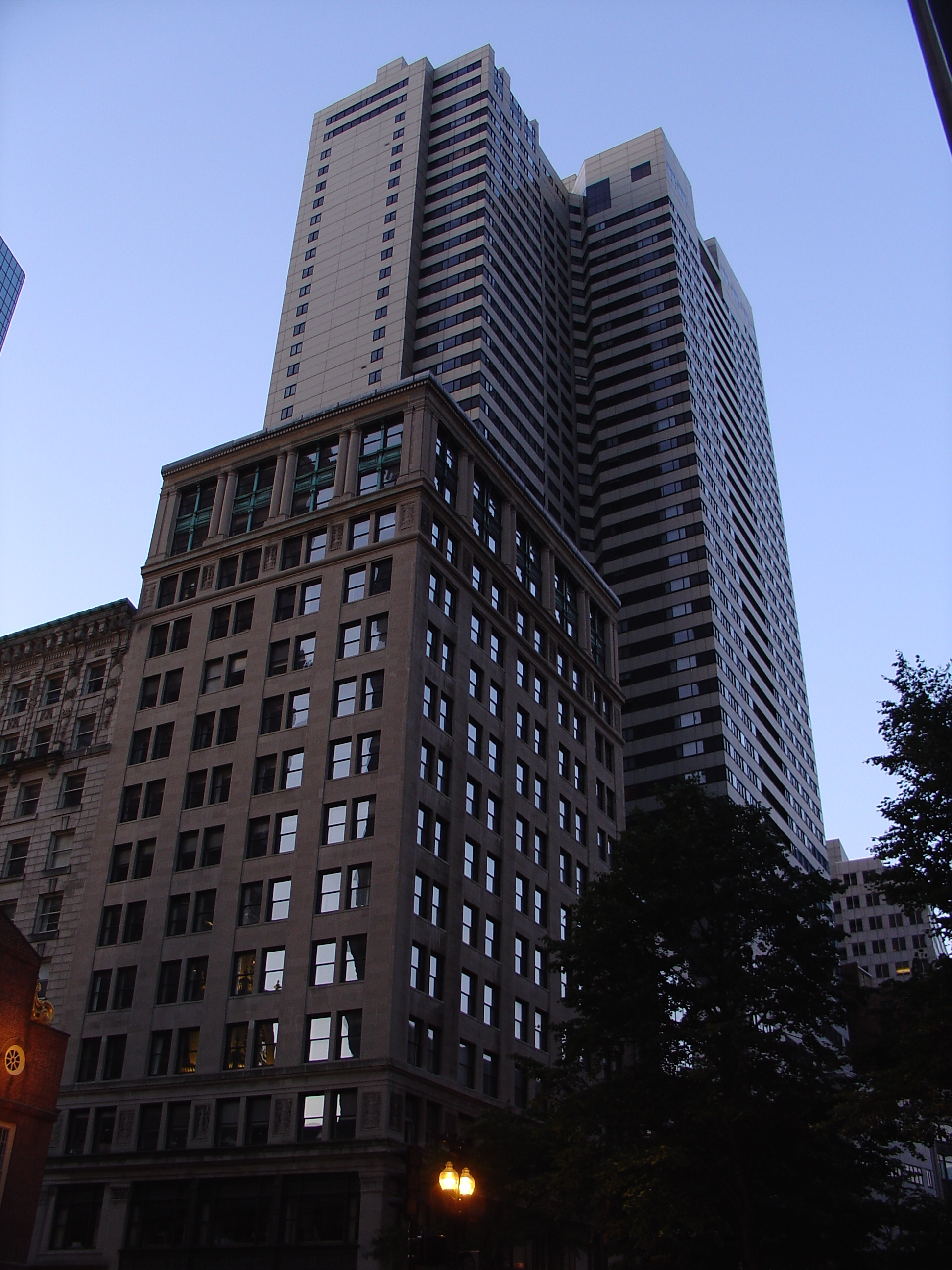
- Interactive map of the One Devonshire Place area

General information
- Type: Office, Residential
- Location: 250 Washington Street, Boston, Massachusetts
- Coordinates: 42.35800°N 71.05754°W
- Completed: 1983

Height
- Roof: 396 ft (121 m)

Technical details
- Floor count: 42

Design and construction
- Architect: Steffian Bradley Architects

Website
- https://www.devonshireboston.com/

One Devonshire Place is a modern skyscraper in the Financial District of Boston, Massachusetts directly across the street from One Boston Place. Built in 1983, it stands tied as the 38th-tallest building in Boston at 396 feet (121 meters) tall, housing 42 floors.

The tower is mixed-use, with 8 floors of offices and 35 of residential space (including a basement level). The building is built on two levels, with the Washington Street side a full story higher than the Devonshire side. There is an open driveway passing through the bottom level between these streets, a rarity for a skyscraper. The building includes a heated indoor pool and a fitness center.

== Education ==
The towers are zoned to Boston Public Schools.

For elementary and middle school, students may apply to:

- Any school within the location's "assignment zone"
  - In this case, the North Zone
- Any school within the location's "walk zone," regardless of the school's "assignment zone."
  - Eligible "walk zone" schools not citywide and not within the North Zone: None known
- Any citywide elementary school, middle school, and K-8

All high schools are considered "citywide".

== See also ==
- List of tallest buildings in Boston
