= Avalon station =

Avalon station may refer to:

- Avalon station (Los Angeles Metro), a light rail station in the Los Angeles area
- Avalon North Station, a residential high-rise building in Boston
- Avalon (RTA Rapid Transit station), a light rail station in Shaker Heights, Ohio
- Avalon station (Sound Transit), a future light rail station in Seattle
- Avalon station (Wisconsin)
- Avalon Airport station, a proposed Melbourne rail extension
