= 125 High Street =

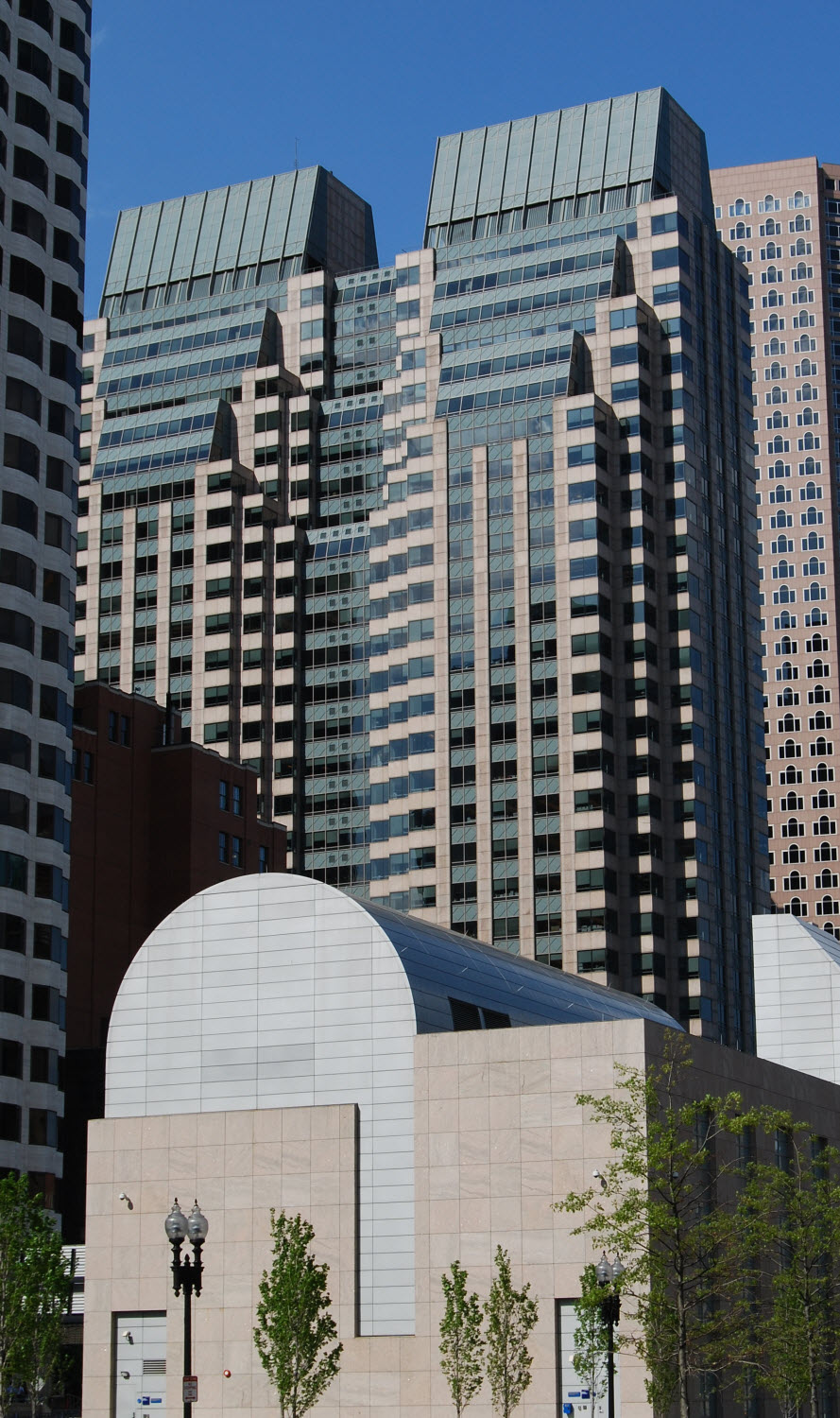
- 125 High Street, center, rear
- Interactive map of the 125 High Street area

General information
- Type: Office
- Location: 125 High Street, Boston, Massachusetts
- Coordinates: 42.35532°N 71.05326°W
- Completed: 1991

Height
- Roof: 452 ft (138 m)

Technical details
- Floor count: 30
- Floor area: 927,149 sq ft (86,135.0 m^{2})

Design and construction
- Architect: Jung Brannen Associates, Inc
- Developer: Tishman Speyer Properties

125 High Street is a 30-floor postmodern highrise in the Financial District of Boston, Massachusetts. Standing 452 feet (138 m) tall, the highrise is currently the 32nd-tallest building in the city. 125 High Street has approximately 1.8 million square feet (167,000 square meters) of Class A office space. It was designed by Jung Brannen Associates and is owned and operated by Tishman Speyer.

== History ==
NYNEX (now Verizon and formerly Bell Atlantic), one of Massachusetts' largest employers, wished to consolidate into a single headquarters facility. It was formerly the site of the Traveler's Insurance Building. The existing 16-story, 300,000 square foot (28,000 square meter) structure was demolished in 1988 to make room for 125 High Street.

== Design and features ==
=== Architecture and layout ===
The complex consists of four buildings.

- 125 High St is a 30-story, 950,000 square foot (88,000 square meter) office tower. This building is the tallest component of a development.
- 145 High St is 21-story, 500,000 square foot (46,000 square meter) office tower. It sometimes also known as the Oliver Street Tower.
- Along with the two towers it also includes three restored 19th century buildings with six, five and four stories, totaling 41,600 square feet (3,900 square meters).
- The fire station makes the office towers one of the few highrises with an on-premises municipal fire company.
- The property also includes a five-level, 850-car underground parking garage.

The exterior is of a unifying granite, with entrances to the building through the High Street Tower and Oliver Street Tower. The two towers are connected via a central 8-story atrium with skylights 150 feet (46 m) above the floor.

=== Design and construction team ===
- Architect: Jung Brannen Associates
- Structural Engineer: LeMessurier Consultants
- MEP/FP Engineer: Cosentini Associates, Inc.
- Developer: Spaulding & Slye (now known as Jones Lang LaSalle)
- Construction Managers: Spaulding & Slye (now known as Jones Lang LaSalle)
- General Contractor: HCB Conctractors (now known as The Beck Group)
- Art Installation: "The Light Between", Anne Patterson's art installation, is no longer on display in the ten-story atrium of 125 High Street. It consisted of seven miles of multi-colored aluminum ribbon. The nearly 450 110' strands transport the light from the glass ceiling above to the viewers below.

== Gallery ==
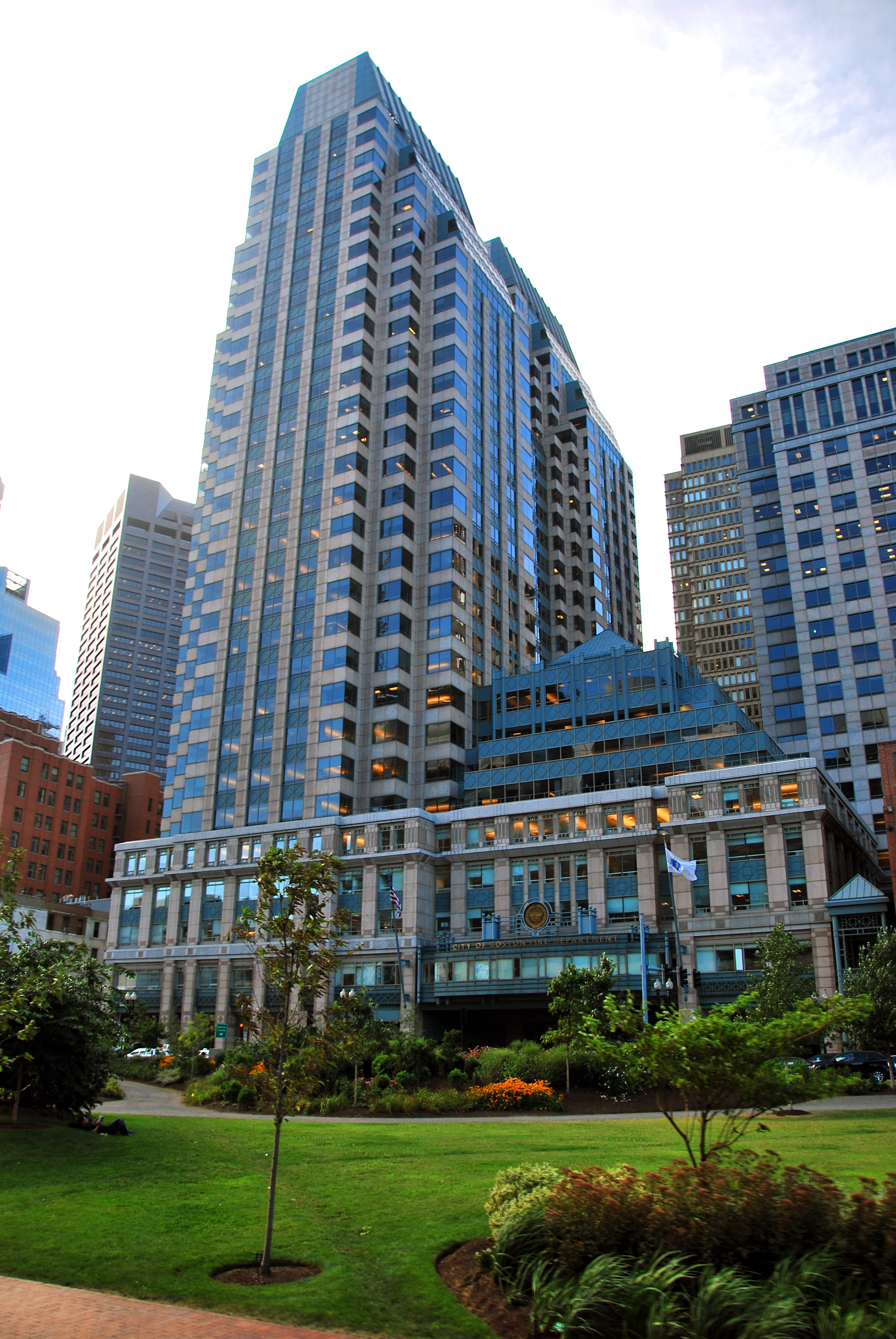
125 High Street with Fire Station

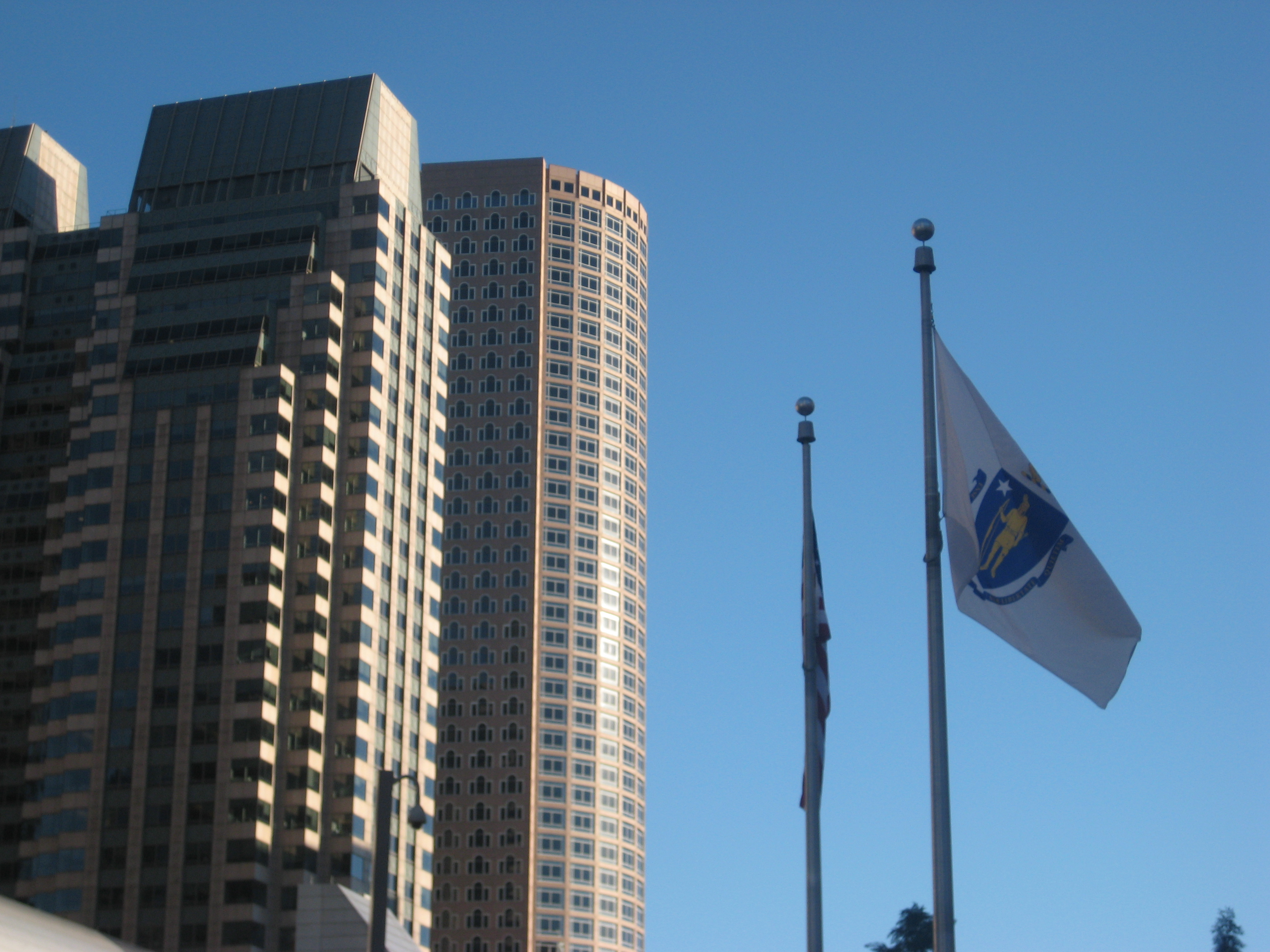

== See also ==
- List of tallest buildings in Boston
