= Elkus Manfredi Architects =

Architectural firm in Boston

Elkus Manfredi Architects is an architectural firm based in Boston, Massachusetts, founded in 1988 by David Manfredi and Howard F. Elkus, both fellows of the American Institute of Architects.

== History ==
In 2022 Elkus Manfredi was the largest architecture firm in Massachusetts.

== Selected works ==
- The Booth Theater, Boston University
- The Village at USC
- Americana
- Emerson College's Paramount Theatre (Boston, Massachusetts) (2009) – complete renovation and major expansion, including new student residence hall
- The Modern – highrise residential complex
- Assembly Square (195 units) and AVA Somerville (253 units) – apartment buildings
- A section of The Galleria, Al Maryah Island, UAE
- The House by Starck and Yoo, a high rise condominium building with interior design by Philippe Starck and Yoo in Victory Park, Dallas
- InterContinental Boston – hotel
- 33 Arch Street in Boston
- CityPlace (West Palm Beach)
- College Avenue Campus, Rutgers-New Brunswick(2016)
- 10 Hudson Yards – retail space
- 200 Amsterdam
- New Brunswick Performing Arts Center
- The Harbor Mérida.
- Woodlawn Residential Commons, University of Chicago
- Merkin Building at the Broad Institute, 415 Main Street, Cambridge, Massachusetts
- Stanley Center at the Broad Institute, 75 Ames Street, Cambridge, Massachusetts

== See also ==
- List of tallest buildings in Boston
