= List of tallest buildings in Boston =

Skyline of Boston
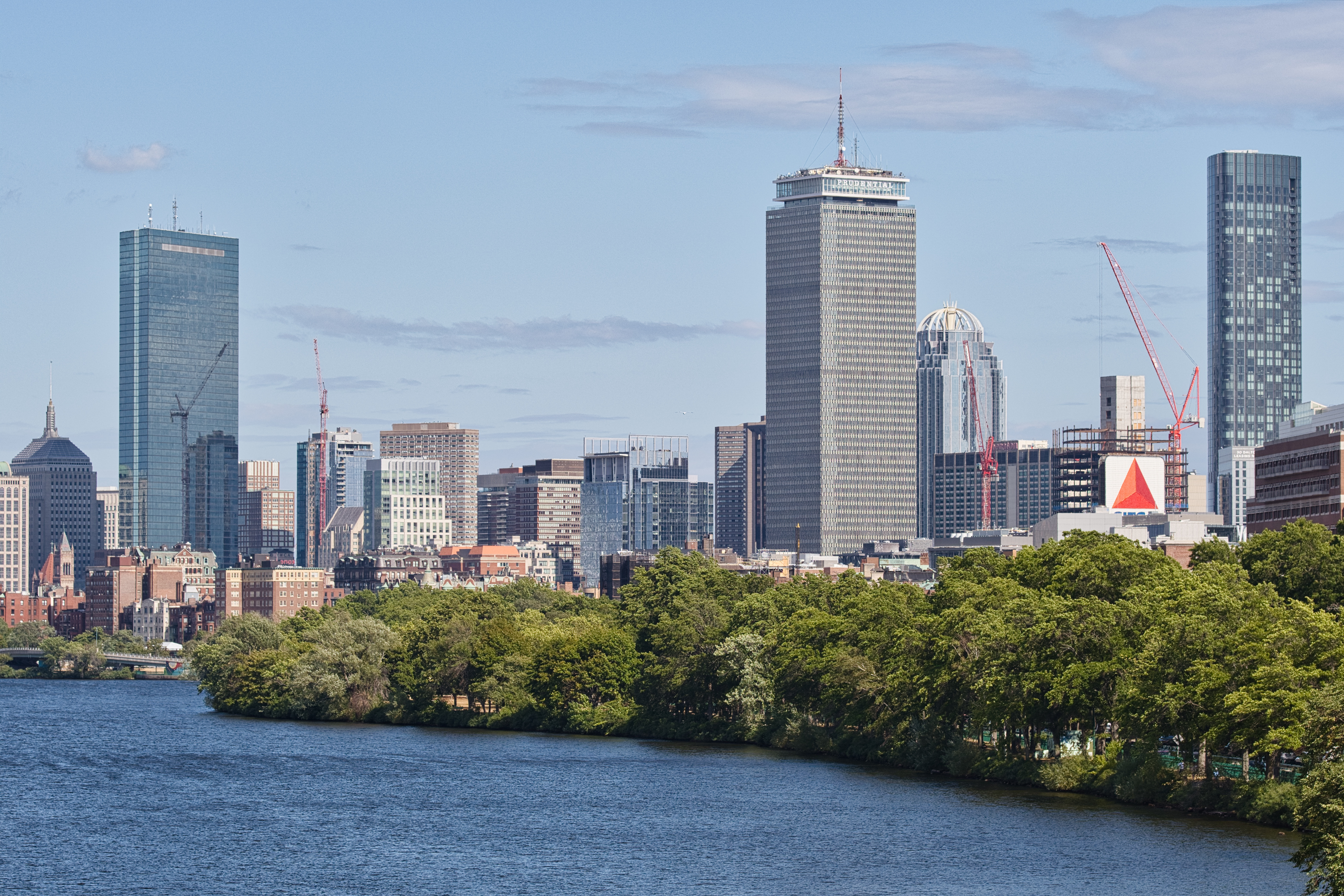
- Skyline of Boston's Back Bay, with its three tallest buildings: The John Hancock Tower (left), Prudential Tower (center), and One Dalton (right)
- Tallest building: John Hancock Tower (1976)
- Tallest building height: 790 ft (241 m)
- First 150 m+ building: Custom House Tower (1915)

Number of tall buildings (2026)
- Taller than 100 m (328 ft): 59
- Taller than 150 m (492 ft): 26
- Taller than 200 m (656 ft): 6

Number of tall buildings — feet
- Taller than 300 ft (91.4 m): 73

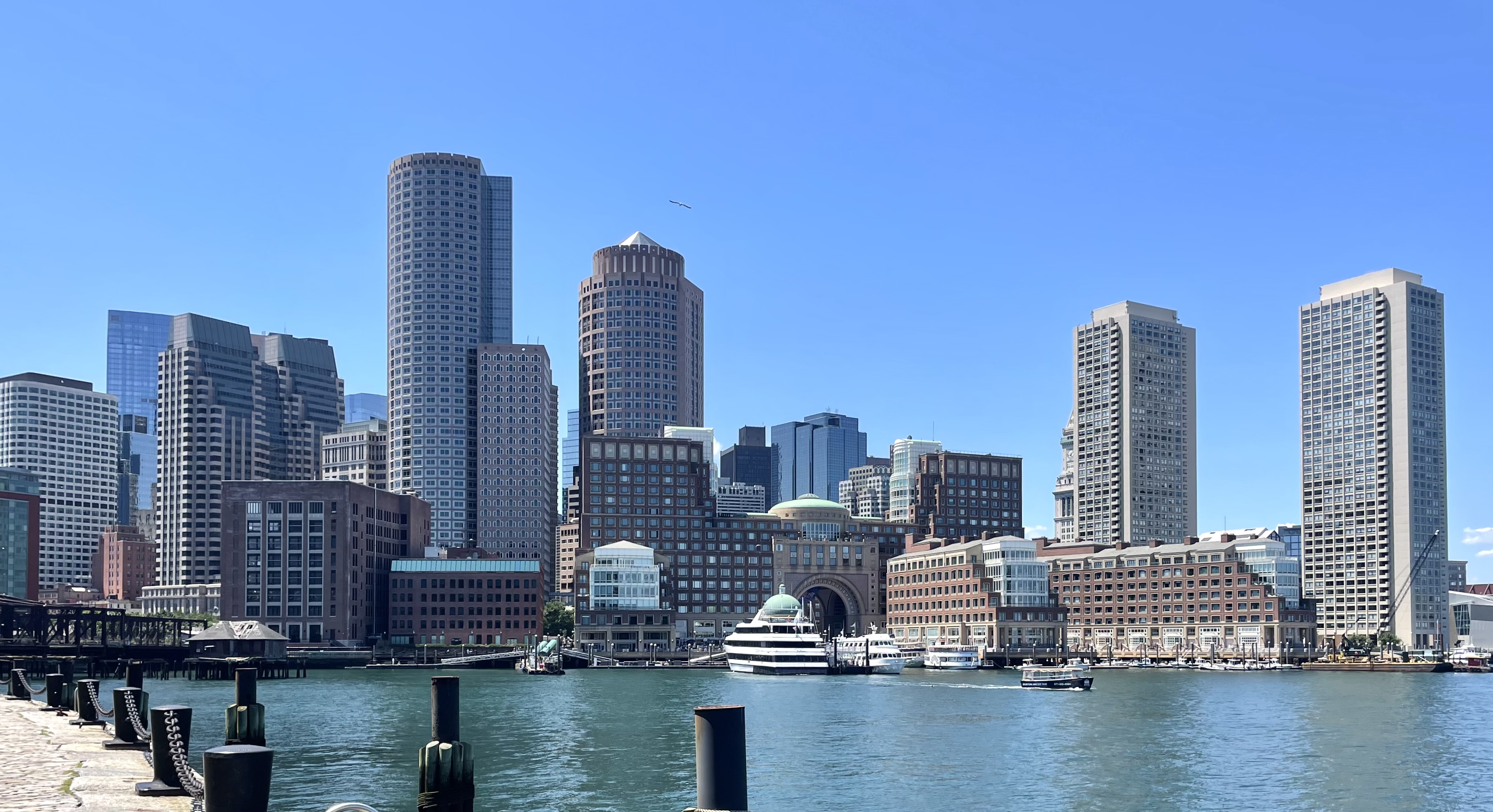
Skyline of Boston's Financial District

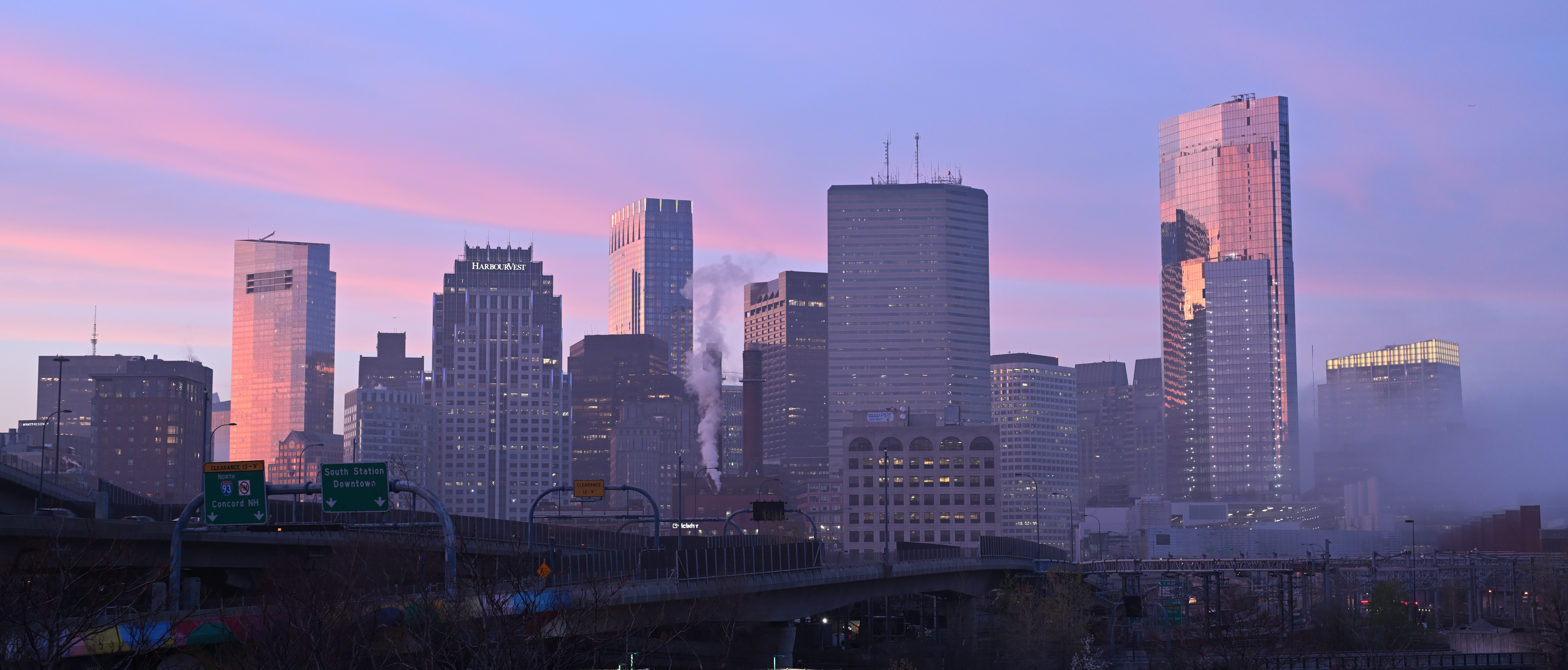
Boston's skyline at dusk from South Boston in 2025

Boston is the capital of the U.S. state of Massachusetts and the largest city in New England. It is home to over 580 completed high-rises, 73 of which stand taller than 300 feet (91 m) as of 2026. Boston's skyline is by far the largest in New England, and the city has the second most skyscrapers taller than 492 ft (150 m) in the Northeastern United States, after New York City. The tallest building in Boston is the 62-story 200 Clarendon, better known as the John Hancock Tower; the office skyscraper rises 790 ft (241 m) in the Back Bay district, southwest of Downtown Boston.

The history of skyscrapers in Boston began early with the completion of the 13-story Ames Building in 1893. The Greek Revival style Custom House Tower, which was Boston's tallest building from 1915 to 1964, was among the first skyscrapers outside of New York City. Boston went through a major building boom from the 1960s to the early 1990s, resulting in the construction of over 30 buildings taller than 300 ft (91 m), including the John Hancock Tower and the city's second-tallest building, the Prudential Tower. At the time of the Prudential Tower's completion in 1964, it stood as the tallest building in North America outside of New York City.

After a hiatus in the 1990s, high-rise development resumed in the 2000s, with a higher share residential or mixed-use buildings. Since 2016, several major projects have significantly altered the city's skyline, including four skyscrapers taller than 600 ft (183 m): Millennium Tower in 2016, One Dalton in 2020, and both Winthrop Center and One Congress in 2023. A fifth, South Station Tower, is under construction atop Boston's historic South Station, and was completed in 2025. Around the same period, the West End neighborhood has seen an influx in high-rises, such as The Hub on Causeway. The regeneration of the Seaport District since the 2000s has added many new high-rises to the former industrial area, although none of them surpass 300 ft in height.

Although Boston's skyscrapers are concentrated in the Financial District in downtown, its three tallest buildings—John Hancock Tower, Prudential Tower, and One Dalton—are located in Back Bay. Boston's skyline is shaped by the roughly 2.5 mile unofficial High Spine urban corridor, bypassing surrounding low-rise residential areas like Beacon Hill and the North End. In addition to the Seaport District southeast of downtown, the skyline has stretched westwards towards Fenway–Kenmore beginning in the 2010s. In the wider metropolitan area, there is an ongoing high-rise boom in neighboring Cambridge, as well as in Somerville to a lesser extent. Regulations on building shadows and the proximity of Logan International Airport to downtown have limited the height of skyscrapers in downtown Boston to below 800 ft (244 m). Boston's tallest public viewing deck is View Boston, located on the upper floors of the Prudential Tower, and provides 360 degree views of the city.

== History ==
Number of buildings by height in Boston by the end of each year. Click on the legend to toggle a specific height on or off. View chart definition.

== Cityscape ==
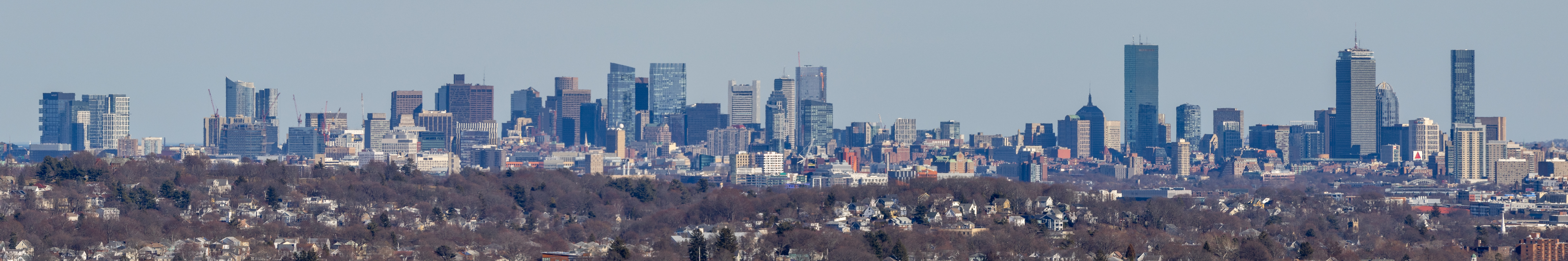
A panorama of the Boston skyline as viewed from Prospect Hill in 2025, with the Financial District on the left and Back Bay to the right

== Map of tallest buildings ==
The map below shows the location of buildings taller than 300 feet (91.4 m) in Boston. Each marker is colored by the decade of the building's completion.

Buildings taller than 300 ft (91 m) in Boston
- 1950s and before
- 1960s
- 1970s
- 1980s
- 1990s
- 2000s
- 2010s
- 2020s
1 John Hancock Tower
2 Prudential Tower
3 One Dalton
4 Winthrop Center
5 Millennium Tower
6 South Station Tower
7 One Congress
8 Federal Reserve Bank Building
9 One Boston Place
10 One International Place
11 100 Federal Street
12 One Financial Center
13 111 Huntington Avenue
14 Two International Place
15 One Post Office Square
16 One Federal Street
17 The Sudbury
18 Exchange Place
19 60 State Street
20 Hub on Causeway Office Tower
21 One Beacon Street
22 One Lincoln Street
23 28 State Street
24 Custom House Tower
25 Berkeley Building
26 Hub on Causeway Residential Tower
27 33 Arch Street
28 The Alcott
29 State Street Bank Building
30 Millennium Place Tower 1
31 Russia Wharf
32 125 High Street
33 100 Summer Street
34 Millennium Place Tower 2
35 Raffles Boston Back Bay Hotel & Residences
36 Avalon North Station
37 Keystone Building
38 Harbor Towers I
39 Harbor Towers II
40 John F. Kennedy Federal Building
41 One Devonshire Place
42 Westin Hotel at Copley Place
43 100 High Street
44 75 State Street
45 Boston Marriott Copley Place
46 101 Federal Street
47 Pierce Boston
48 177 Huntington
49 45 Province Street
50 500 Boylston Street
51 50 Post Office Square
52 Center for Life Science
53 John W. McCormack Post Office and Courthouse
54 AVA Theatre District Tower
55 101 Huntington Avenue
56 The Clarendon
57 Liberty Mutual Tower
58 Student Village Residence Halls II
59 Suffolk County Courthouse
60 888 Boylston Street
61 1001 Boylston Street
62 260 Franklin Street
63 McCormack Building
64 Avalon Exeter
65 100 Cambridge Street
66 Sheraton Boston Hotel South Tower
67 The Kensington
68 222 Berkeley Street
69 Ellison Building
70 W Boston Hotel and Residences
71 Duan Family Center for Computing & Data Sciences
72 Radian Apartments
73 Oliver Street Tower

== Tallest buildings ==
This list ranks completed buildings in Boston that stand at least 300 feet (91 m) tall as of 2026, based on standard height measurement. This includes spires and other architectural details, but not including antenna masts. The "Year" column indicates the year when a building was completed. Buildings tied in height are sorted by year of completion, and then alphabetically.

Was the tallest building in Boston upon completion

Rank	Name	Image	Location	Height ft (m)	Floors	Year	Purpose	Notes
1	John Hancock Tower		42°20′57″N 71°04′30″W	790 (241)	62	1976	Office	Tallest building in Boston, Massachusetts, and New England since 1976. Commonly known as John Hancock Tower, its original name (for John Hancock Financial), but now legally 200 Clarendon Street or Hancock Place. Tallest building in Boston completed in the 1970s.
2	Prudential Tower		42°20′50″N 71°04′57″W	749 (228)	52	1964	Office	View Boston, the highest observation deck in New England, is located on the building's 50th, 51st, and 52nd floors. Tallest building in Boston completed in the 1960s. Was the tallest building in Boston before being surpassed by the John Hancock Tower in 1976.
3	One Dalton		42°20′45″N 71°05′02″W	742 (226)	61	2020	Mixed-use	Tallest residential building in Boston and New England. Tallest building in Boston completed in the 2020s. Mixed-use residential and hotel building.
4	Winthrop Center		42°21′16″N 71°03′26″W	691 (211)	53	2023	Mixed-use	Tallest building in Boston outside of Back Bay. Second tallest building in Boston completed in the 2020s. Mixed-use residential and office building.
5	Millennium Tower		42°21′21″N 71°03′34″W	685 (209)	54	2016	Residential	Tallest building in the Downtown Crossing neighborhood. Tallest building in Boston completed in the 2010s.
6	South Station Tower		42°21′05″N 71°03′18″W	677 (206)	51	2025	Mixed-use	Mixed-use residential and office building. Located above South Station. Topped out in November 2023.
7	Federal Reserve Bank Building	Aerial view of a tall, narrow, concrete skyscraper; the building's design somewhat resembles that of a washboard, with uninterrupted horizontal rows of windows protruding slightly outward from two of the building's four sides	42°21′10″N 71°03′15″W	614 (187)	32	1978	Office	Headquarters of the Federal Reserve Bank of Boston. Formerly the tallest building in Boston's Financial District until 2016 with the completion of the Millennium Tower.
8	One Congress		42°21′45″N 71°03′36″W	610 (186)	43	2023	Office	Topped off on July 15, 2021.
9	One Boston Place		42°21′31″N 71°03′30″W	601 (183)	41	1970	Office	Tallest building in the Government Center neighborhood of Boston
10	One International Place	Aerial view of two skyscrapers; both have circular footprints and light red facades. The shorter of the two buildings, in the foreground, is topped by a pyramid-like cap, while the taller building has a flat roof.	42°21′21″N 71°03′08″W	600 (183)	46	1987	Office	Tallest building in Boston constructed in the 1980s.
11	100 Federal Street		42°21′18″N 71°03′22″W	591 (180)	37	1971	Office	Also known as First National Bank Building. Popularly known as “The Pregnant Building.”
12	One Financial Center	Ground-level view of a 45-story building with a trapezoidal footprint, a white facade and black windows	42°21′08″N 71°03′23″W	590 (180)	46	1984	Office	
13	111 Huntington Avenue	Angled aerial view of an all-glass building capped with a white, open-air dome	42°20′47″N 71°04′53″W	554 (169)	36	2002	Office	Second-tallest building in the Prudential Center complex. Tallest building in Boston completed in the 2000s.
14	Two International Place	Aerial view of a round building with a light-red facade, topped with a pyramid-like cap; in the foreground is a shorter building with an all-glass facade	42°21′23″N 71°03′07″W	538 (164)	35	1993	Office	Tallest building in Boston completed in the 1990s
15	One Post Office Square	Ground-level view of a 40-story skyscraper with a glass facade; minor setbacks are visible around the tower's 30th floor	42°21′25″N 71°03′19″W	525 (160)	40	1981	Office	
16	One Federal Street	Ground-level view of a 38-story rectangular skyscraper with a tan facade and dark bluish windows	42°21′24″N 71°03′25″W	520 (158)	38	1976	Office	Originally known as the Shawmut Bank Building.
17	The Sudbury		42°21′44″N 71°03′35″W	519 (158)	49	2020	Residential	Also known as the Bulfinch Crossing Residential Tower.
18	Exchange Place	Ground-level view of a 40-story skyscraper with an all-glass facade and several setbacks. In the facade is a reflection of a dark brown building with lighter windows, and near the bottom of the skyscraper is a small white building with dark windows	42°21′30″N 71°03′22″W	510 (155)	39	1984	Office	
19	60 State Street	Aerial view of a 40-story skyscraper with a tan facade and dark windows; a major setback is visible near the building's roofline, at roughly the 35th floor	42°21′33″N 71°03′23″W	509 (155)	38	1977	Office	
20	Hub on Causeway Office Tower		42°21′58″N 71°03′40″W	508 (155)	30	2021	Office	Tallest building in the West End
21	One Beacon Street	One_Beacon_St_Boston	42°21′30″N 71°03′39″W	505 (154)	36	1972	Office	
22	One Lincoln Street	Fround-level view of an ornate building with alternating concrete and blue-tinted glass facades. Near the building's roofline, a sign with the words "STATE STREET" is visible. Capping the building is a crown-like structure composed of blue glass and white spires.	42°21′10″N 71°03′30″W	503 (153)	36	2003	Office	
23	28 State Street	Ground-level view of a 40-story building with a white, concrete facade and dark windows; near the building's roofline, a prominent setback is visible	42°21′34″N 71°03′27″W	500 (152)	40	1970	Office	
24	Custom House Tower	Angled, ground-level view of white limestone tower. Near the building's pyramidal-cap, a large, 4-faced clock is visible	42°21′33″N 71°03′13″W	496 (151)	32	1915	Hotel	Tallest all-hotel building in Boston. Tallest building in Boston completed in the 1910s. Was the tallest building in Boston before being surpassed by the Prudential Tower.
25=	Berkeley Building		42°20′59″N 71°04′24″W	495 (151)	26	1949	Office	Also known as the Old John Hancock Building. Tallest building in Boston completed in the 1940s.
25=	Hub on Causeway Residential Tower		42°21′56″N 71°03′44″W	495 (151)	45	2019	Mixed-use	Second-tallest building in the West End. Mixed-use residential and hotel building.
27	33 Arch Street	Ground-level view of a modern, 33-story skyscraper with a curved front and glass facade reflecting the blue of the sky	42°21′21″N 71°03′28″W	489 (149)	33	2004	Office	
28	The Alcott		42°21′55″N 71°03′54″W	485 (148)	44	2021	Residential	Third-tallest building in the West End. Also known as 35 Lomasney Way or the Garden Garage Redevelopment Project.
29	State Street Bank Building	Ground-level view of a rectangular building with a dark gray facade and clear windows	42°21′22″N 71°03′15″W	477 (145)	33	1966	Office	Also known as 225 Franklin Street.
30	Millennium Place Tower 1	Ground-level view of a modern, 40-story skyscraper with a gray-tinted, all-glass facade	42°21′10″N 71°03′47″W	475 (145)	38	2001	Mixed-use	Mixed-use residential and hotel building. Also known as Ritz-Carlton Towers Boston Common - Tower II.
31	Russia Wharf	Atlantic Wharf, 503 Atlantic Avenue, Boston, Massachusetts	42°21′12″N 71°03′10″W	456 (139)	31	2011	Mixed-use	Also known as Atlantic Wharf. Mixed-use office and residential building.
32	125 High Street	Ground-level view of a complex of skyscrapers; the tallest building is on the left, with a light tan facade and a green-gray trapezoidal cap.	42°21′18″N 71°03′13″W	452 (138)	30	1990	Office	Also known as High Street Tower.
33	100 Summer Street	Ground-level view of a building with an all-glass, black-tinted facade; three setbacks are visible.	42°21′14″N 71°03′27″W	450 (137)	32	1974	Office	
34	Millennium Place Tower 2	Ground-level view of a modern skyscraper with a gray-tinted, all-glass facade	42°21′13″N 71°03′46″W	446 (136)	36	2001	Mixed-use	Mixed-use residential and hotel building. Also known as Ritz-Carlton Towers Boston Common - Tower II.
35	Avalon North Station		42°21′57″N 71°03′48″W	415 (126)	38	2016	Residential	Also known as Nashua Street Residences. Fourth-tallest building in the West End neighborhood
36=	The Lyra			400	34	2026	Residential	
36=	Keystone Building	Ground-level view of a building with rounded corners, a grooved, white facade and dark black windows	42°21′15″N 71°03′16″W	400 (122)	32	1971	Office	
36=	Harbor Towers I	Distant view of two waterfront skyscrapers; both have Brutalist-style architecture, with concrete facades. Though very similar in appearance, the building on the right is taller and thinner. Several anchored sailboats are visible in the foreground.	42°21′29″N 71°02′59″W	400 (121.9)	40	1971	Residential	
39=	Harbor Towers II	Distant view of two waterfront skyscrapers; both have Brutalist-style architecture, with concrete facades. Though very similar in appearance, the building on the right is taller and thinner. Several anchored sailboats are visible in the foreground.	42°21′27″N 71°03′02″W	396 (121)	40	1971	Residential	
39=	One Devonshire Place		42°21′29″N 71°03′27″W	396 (121)	42	1983	Mixed-use	Mixed-use residential and office building.
41	Westin Hotel at Copley Place		42°20′54″N 71°04′40″W	395 (120)	36	1983	Hotel	
42	100 High Street		42°21′16″N 71°03′19″W	394 (120)	28	1988	Hotel	
43	Raffles Boston Back Bay Hotel & Residences		42°20′55″N 71°04′30″W	393 (120)	33	2022	Mixed-use	Also known by its address, 40 Trinity Place. Mixed-use hotel and residential building.
44	75 State Street		42°21′30″N 71°03′18″W	390 (119)	31	1988	Office	
45	John F. Kennedy Federal Building		42°21′40″N 71°03′36″W	387 (118)	26	1967	Government	
46	Boston Marriott Copley Place		42°20′48″N 71°04′44″W	382 (116.4)	39	1984	Hotel	
47	101 Federal Street		42°21′18″N 71°03′25″W	382 (116.3)	31	1988	Hotel	
48	Pierce Boston		42°20′38″N 71°06′06″W	378 (115.2)	30	2018	Residential	
49=	177 Huntington		42°20′42″N 71°04′58″W	367 (111.9)	28	1973	Office	Also known as the Christian Science Administration Building.
49=	45 Province Street	–	42°21′26″N 71°03′36″W	367 (111.9)	31	2009	Residential	
51	500 Boylston Street		42°21′01″N 71°04′27″W	365 (111.3)	23	1985	Office	
52	50 Post Office Square		42°21′20″N 71°03′18″W	364 (111)	20	1947	Office	Also known as the Verizon Building, New England Telephone & Telegraph Building, and Telephone Building.
53	Center for Life Science	–	42°20′21″N 71°06′15″W	348 (106.1)	18	2008	Laboratory	
54	John W. McCormack Post Office and Courthouse		42°21′26″N 71°03′25″W	345 (105.2)	22	1931	Government	
55	AVA Theatre District Tower	–	42°21′05″N 71°03′50″W	338 (103)	29	2015	Residential	
56	101 Huntington Avenue		42°20′49″N 71°04′51″W	336 (102.4)	25	1973	Office	
57	The Clarendon	–	42°20′55″N 71°04′26″W	336 (102.4)	32	2009	Residential	
58	Liberty Mutual Tower		42°20′57″N 71°04′18″W	335 (102.1)	23	2013	Office	
59	Student Village Residence Halls II		42°21′12″N 71°07′04″W	331 (100.9)	26	2009	Residential	Student residences. Part of the John Hancock Student Village.
60	Suffolk County Couthouse		42°21′35″N 71°03′40″W	330 (100.6)	19	1939	Government	
61	888 Boylston Street	–	42°20′53″N 71°04′58″W	325 (99)	18	2017	Office	
62	1001 Boylston Street	–	42°20′51″N 71°05′18″W	325 (99)	20	2024	Office	Also known as Parcel 12 Office Building.
63	260 Franklin Street	–	42°21′25″N 71°03′14″W	323 (98.4)	23	1985	Office	
64	McCormack Building		42°21′34″N 71°03′45″W	322 (98)	22	1975	Office	
65	Avalon Exeter	–	42°20′55″N 71°04′46″W	320 (97.5)	28	2014	Residential	
66	100 Cambridge Street	–	42°21′38″N 71°03′44″W	318 (97)	26	1965	Mixed-use	Currently a mixed-use office and residential building. Formerly known as the Leverett Saltonstall Building.
67	Sheraton Boston Hotel South Tower	–	42°20′46″N 71°05′01″W	313 (95.4)	29	1965	Hotel	
68	The Kensington	–	42°21′07″N 71°03′48″W	313 (95.4)	27	2013	Residential	
69	222 Berkeley Street	–	42°21′02″N 71°04′24″W	309 (94.2)	22	1991	Office	
70	Ellison Building	–	42°21′48″N 71°04′10″W	306 (93.4)	24	1992	Health	Part of the Massachusetts General Hospital. Tallest hospital building in Boston.
71	W Boston Hotel and Residences		42°21′03″N 71°03′56″W	306 (93.2)	27	2009	Mixed-use	
72	Duan Family Center for Computing & Data Sciences		42°21′00″N 71°06′11″W	305 (93)	18	2022	Education	Part of Boston University. Tallest educational building in Boston.
73	Radian Apartments	–	42°21′08″N 71°03′33″W	302 (92)	26	2014	Residential	
74	Oliver Street Tower	–	42°21′20″N 71°03′11″W	301 (91.8)	21	1991	Office	

=== Tallest building by neighborhood ===
Neighborhood	Building	Height ft (m)	Floors	Year	Notes
Back Bay	200 Clarendon	790 (241)	60	1976	
Downtown Crossing	Millennium Tower	685 (209)	60	2016	
Financial District	Federal Reserve Bank Building	614 (187)	32	1976	
Chinatown	One Lincoln Street	503 (153)	36	2003	
Government Center	28 State Street	500 (152)	40	1970	
Theatre District	The Ritz-Carlton Boston Common	475 (145)	38	2001	
West End	The Hub on Causeway	496 (151)	45	2021	
Waterfront	Harbor Towers I	400 (122)	40	1971	
Fenway–Kenmore	Pierce Boston	378 (115)	30	2018	
Beacon Hill	McCormack Building	322 (98)	22	1975	

=== Greater Boston ===
Greater Boston
- Population: 5,025,517 (2024 estimate)
- Cities included: Boston, Cambridge, Everett

Number of tall buildings (2026)
- Taller than 100 m (328 ft): 63
- Taller than 150 m (492 ft): 26
- Taller than 200 m (656 ft): 6

Number of tall buildings — feet
- Taller than 300 ft (91.4 m): 77

The following table lists buildings in Greater Boston outside of Boston with a height greater than 300 ft (91 m).

Rank	Name	Image	Location	Height ft (m)	Floors	Year	Purpose	Notes
1	121 Broadway		Cambridge 42°21′53″N 71°05′17″W	450 (137.1)	37	2026	Residential	Tallest building in Cambridge. Tallest building in Greater Boston outside of Boston.
2	Encore Boston Harbor		Everett 42°23′42″N 71°04′10″W	372 (113.4)	26	2019	Hotel	Tallest building in Everett. Hotel and casino building.
3	Graduate Tower at Site 4		Cambridge 42°21′43″N 71°05′08″W	335 (102)	29	2021	Mixed-use	Also known as Site 4 at Kendall Square, 290 Main Street, or MIT Site 4. Mixed-use residential, educational, and office building.

== Tallest under construction ==
There are two buildings under construction in Boston that are expected to be at least 300 ft (91 m) tall as of 2026, based on standard height measurement.

Name	Height ft (m)	Floors	Year	Notes
CSP - 4B Tower	302 (92)	12	2027	

== Timeline of tallest buildings ==
For most of Boston's earlier years, the tallest buildings in the city were churches with their steeples. The first skyscraper in the city is generally considered the Ames Building, completed in 1893. However, since the 13-story building did not surpass the steeple of the Church of the Covenant, it never became a city record holder. The first skyscraper to have the distinction of being Boston's tallest building was the Custom House Tower, completed in 1915.

Name	Image	Street address	Years as tallest	Height ft (m)	Floors	Notes
Old State House	Ground-level view of a 3-story, colonial-era brick building with a prominent white tower on one end; several glass skyscrapers are visible in the distance.	206 Washington Street	1713–1745	65 (20)	3	
Old North Church	Black-and-white etching of a colonial-era church, viewed from a distance; the church is topped with a very tall steeple	193 Salem Street	1745–1810	175 (53)	1	
Park Street Church	Ground level view of a brick church with a prominent white steeple; a grassy park is visible in the foreground, and a rectangular skyscraper with a tan facade and black windows is in the distance	1 Park Street	1810–1867	217 (66)	1	
Church of the Covenant	Ground-level view of a Gothic-style cathedral with a prominent, ornate steeple on one end	67 Newbury Street	1867–1915	236 (72)	1	
Custom House Tower	Distant, ground-level view of white limestone tower. The building is topped with a pyramidal-cap, and a large, 4-faced clock is visible just below the main roofline	3 McKinley Square	1915–1964	496 (151)	32	
Prudential Tower	Distant ground-level view of a tall, gray rectangular tower with a steel latticework facade and a tall antenna mast on its roof	800 Boylston Street	1964–1976	749 (228)	52	
John Hancock Tower	Angled, ground-level view of a broad, 60-story building with a blue-tinted, all-glass facade	200 Clarendon Street	1976–present	790 (241)	60	

== See also ==
- Architecture of Boston
- List of tallest buildings in Massachusetts outside of Boston
- List of tallest buildings in Cambridge, Massachusetts
- List of tallest buildings in Springfield, Massachusetts
- List of tallest buildings in Worcester, Massachusetts
- Trans National Place
