= Millennium Place =

Apartment building in Boston, Massachusetts

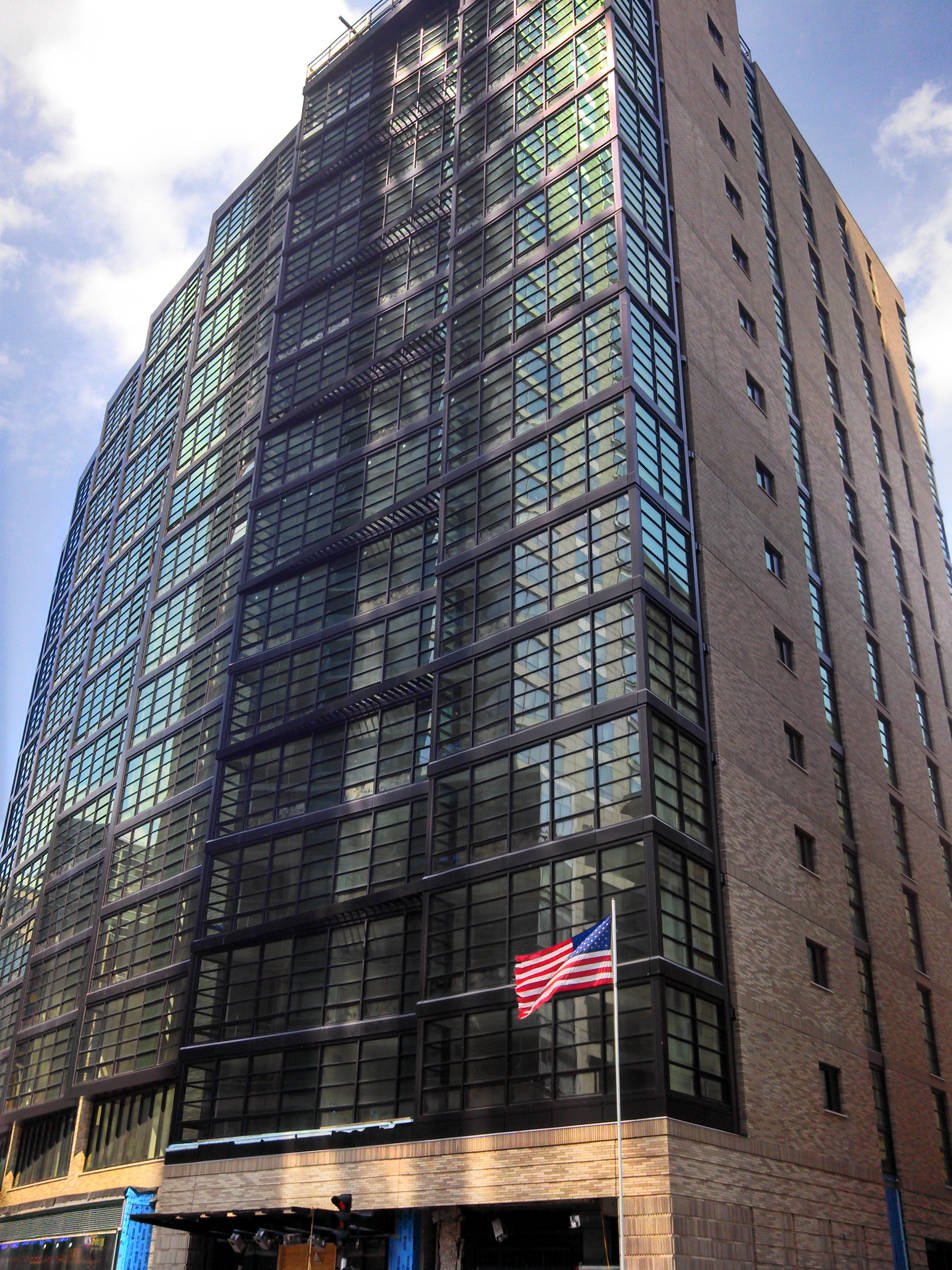
- Interactive map of the Millennium Place area

General information
- Type: Condominium
- Location: Washington Street, Boston, Massachusetts
- Coordinates: 42.35302°N 71.06294°W
- Completed: 2013

Height
- Roof: 155 ft (47 m)

Technical details
- Floor count: 15 / 15

Design and construction
- Architect: Handel Architects
- Developer: Millennium Partners MDA Associates, Inc.
- Structural engineer: DeSimone Consulting Engineers, Cosentini Associates

Millennium Place is a luxury residential building located in Boston, Massachusetts. The building completes Boston's Avery Street corridor development, which includes the Ritz Carlton Hotel & Residences, Equinox Fitness Club, and the AMC Loews Boston Common movie theater.

Designed by Handel Architects of New York City; Millennium Place is 256 units, was completed in the autumn of 2013, and became the fastest selling residential property in Boston history.

== See also ==
- List of tallest buildings in Boston
