= Trans National Place =

- Conceptual rendering of an unapproved design by Renzo Piano

General information
- Status: Canceled and superseded
- Type: Office, Garden, Observation, Restaurant, Retail
- Location: 115 Federal Street, Boston, Massachusetts
- Coordinates: 42°21′16″N 71°03′25″W

Design and construction
- Architect: Childs Bertman Tseckares Inc.
- Developer: Trans National Properties, Steve Belkin

Trans National Place (also known by its site address, 115 Winthrop Square) was a proposed supertall skyscraper planned for downtown Boston, Massachusetts. The project was withdrawn in 2008 and later replaced by a different development on the same parcel.

== Proposal and design ==
In February 2006, Boston mayor Thomas M. Menino proposed replacing a city-owned parking garage at 115 Federal Street in the financial district of Boston with a 70-to-80 story building. Trans National Properties, controlled by Steve Belkin was the sole bidder to respond to the request for proposals by the Boston Redevelopment Authority.

The plan called for a 75 story, mixed-use building that would rise 1,175 feet (358 meters) and include office space, retail, and related amenities. The proposed height would have exceeded 200 Clarendon Street (John Hancock Tower), the tallest building in Boston at the time.

The initial design was developed by architect Renzo Piano, working with the Boston-based firm Childs Bertman Tseckares Inc. In March 2007, Piano withdrew from the project.

== Regulatory review and objections ==
In 2007, the Federal Aviation Administration (FAA) issued an objection indicating that the proposed structure height would pose a hazard to aircraft operations at Logan International Airport. A final determination letter in 2008 reaffirmed this finding and cited conflicts with established flight paths into Boston.

At approximately the same time, the commercial real estate market weakened, and project financing conditions changed. In 2008, the proposal was formally canceled.

== Redevelopment of the site ==
After the cancellation, the parcel remained vacant until a new request-for-proposals process resulted in a different project selection. In 2016, the Boston Planning and Development Agency (BPDA) approved a new tower, later constructed as Winthrop Center, a mixed-use building with a significantly lower height than the original proposal for Trans National Place.

== See also ==
- List of tallest buildings in Boston
- Architecture of Boston
