= Massachusetts Department of Higher Education =

State agency of Massachusetts

Massachusetts Department of Higher Education (DHE) is a state agency of Massachusetts overseeing tertiary education. Its headquarters is in One Ashburton Place in Boston. Its Office of Student Financial Assistance is in Malden.

It is controlled by the Massachusetts Board of Higher Education (BHE), which has thirteen members, and is itself a state agency.

== See also ==
- Education in Massachusetts
- List of colleges and universities in Massachusetts
- List of research universities in the United States
- Carnegie Classification of Institutions of Higher Education
- Center for Measuring University Performance
- College Entrance Examination Board (CEEB)
- New England Association of Schools and Colleges (NEASC)
- New England Board of Higher Education
- New England Commission of Higher Education (NECHE)
- Research I university
