= One Dalton =

Skyscraper in Boston, Massachusetts

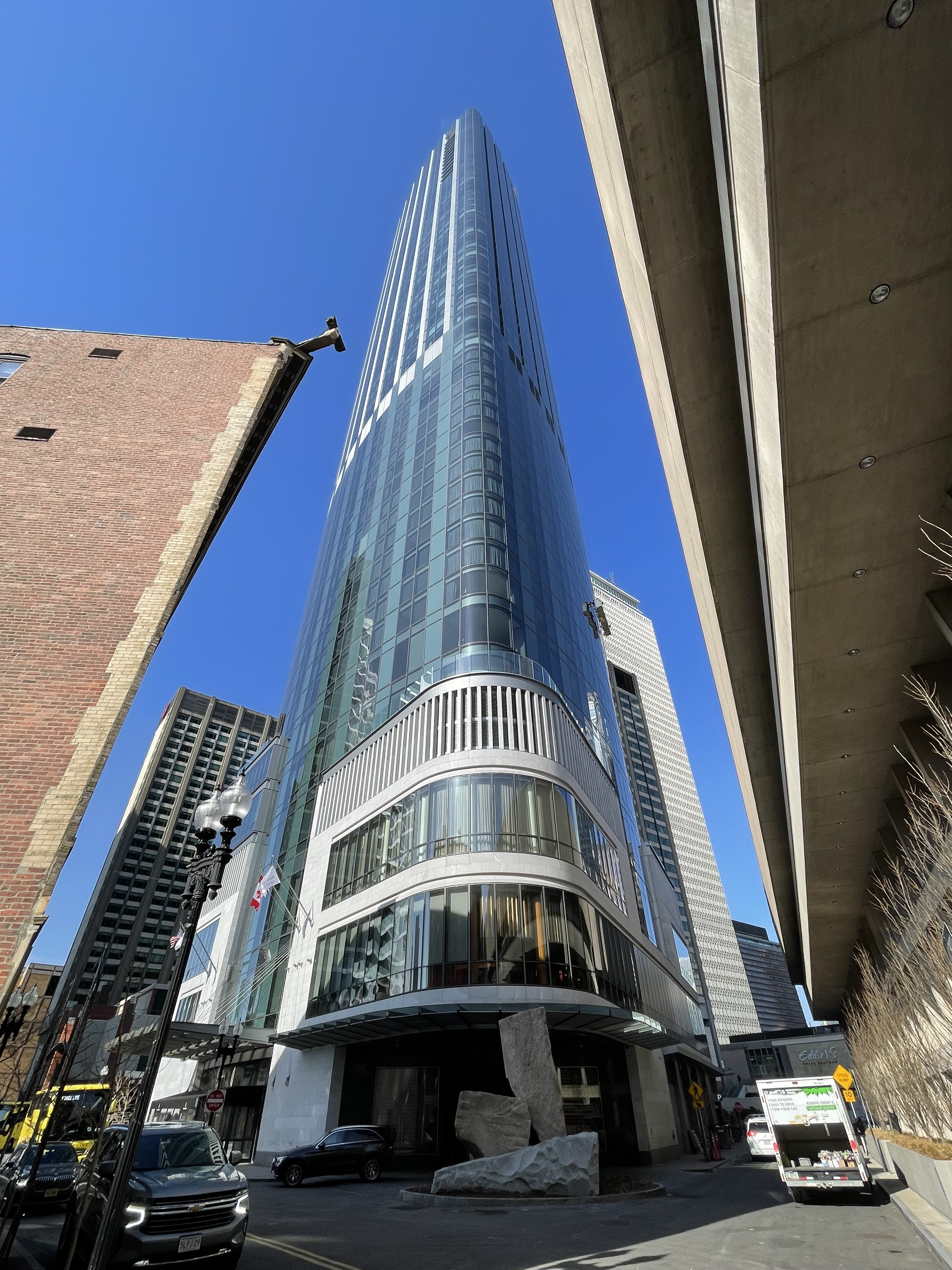
- One Dalton's southern façade
- Interactive map of the One Dalton area

General information
- Status: Completed
- Type: Office, Hotel, Retail
- Coordinates: 42°20′44.7″N 71°05′02.2″W
- Construction started: 2015
- Completed: 2019
- Opening: May 28, 2019
- Cost: US$700 million

Height
- Roof: 742 ft (226 m)

Technical details
- Floor count: 61
- Floor area: 706,000 sq ft (65,600 m^{2})

Design and construction
- Architects: Henry N. Cobb, Pei Cobb Freed & Partners and CambridgeSeven
- Developer: Carpenter & Company, Inc.

One Dalton is a 850,000 sq ft (79,000 m^{2}) skyscraper in Boston, Massachusetts. It is the third tallest building in Boston, the tallest residential building in New England, and the tallest building constructed in the city since Hancock Place in 1976. It is located in the Back Bay neighborhood, not far from 200 Clarendon Street and the Prudential Tower, the two tallest skyscrapers in Boston. It contains the Four Seasons Hotel & Private Residences, One Dalton Street.

== Complex ==
One Dalton Street was built along with a 26-story building, 30 Dalton Street. Pritzker Realty Group is developing the smaller tower. Both projects are designed by collaborating architects Cambridge Seven Associates and Pei Cobb Freed & Partners, the latter which also designed Boston's landmark John Hancock Tower in 1976.

The building contains a ballroom, meeting rooms available for reservation, a gym with a spa, a private dining space, and other services. There will also be a five-thousand-square-foot (460 m^{2}) park outside the building. The residences have gas indoor fireplaces in each unit, outdoor fireplaces on the balconies of select units, and 11-foot cove ceilings.

The 160 condominium residences were criticized for being an ultra-luxury property which would have non-resident often hidden foreign owners. There was considerable controversy for expanding natural gas infrastructure including a new natural gas main at a time when the city was starting to decarbonize. The financing of the construction of the new gas line was also criticized as being inequitable such that in 2018, the Attorney General Maura Healey opposed the Special Contract between National Grid and the developer which had to be approved by the state Department of Public Utilities.

== Gallery ==
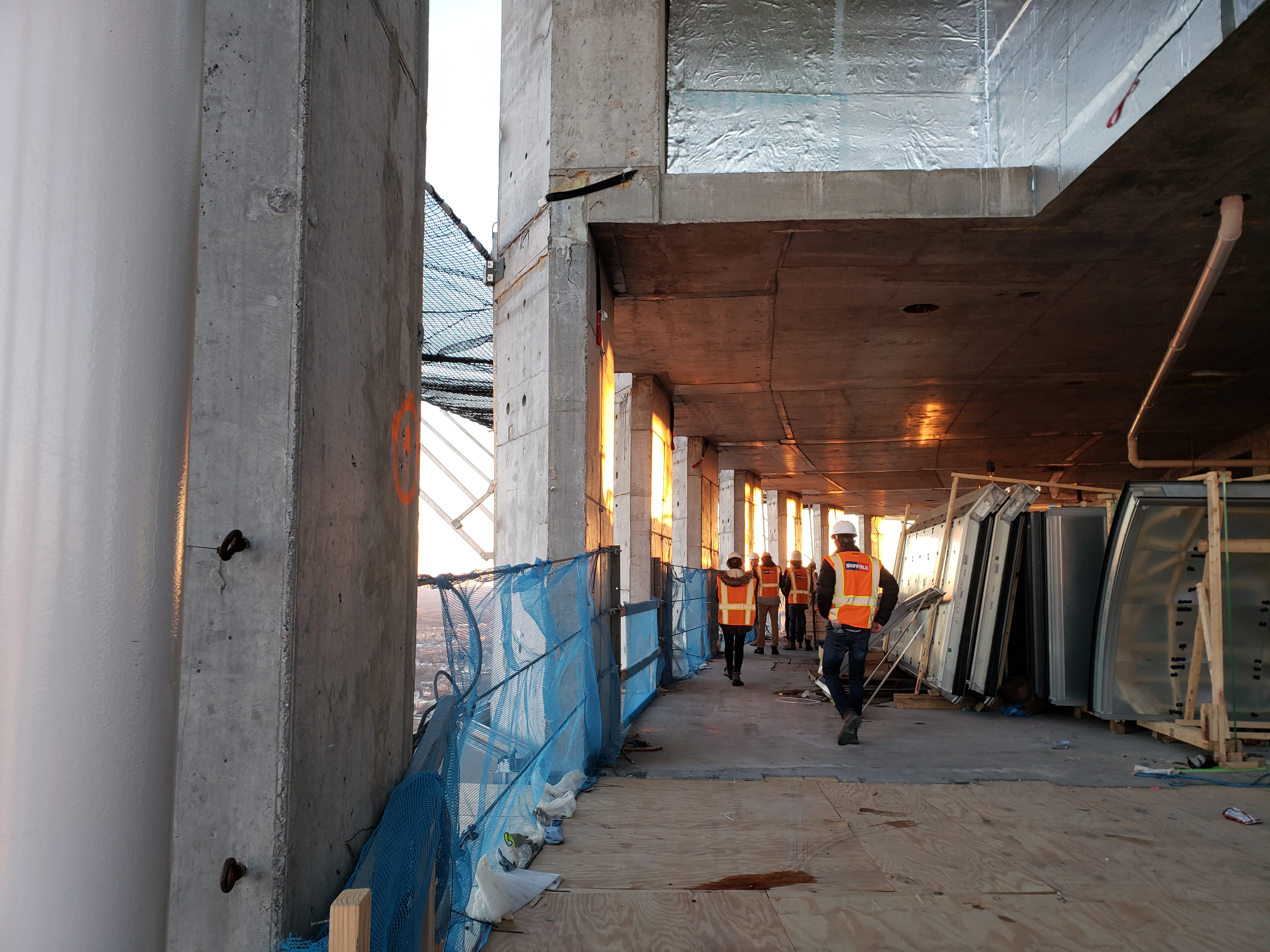
One Dalton under construction in December 2018

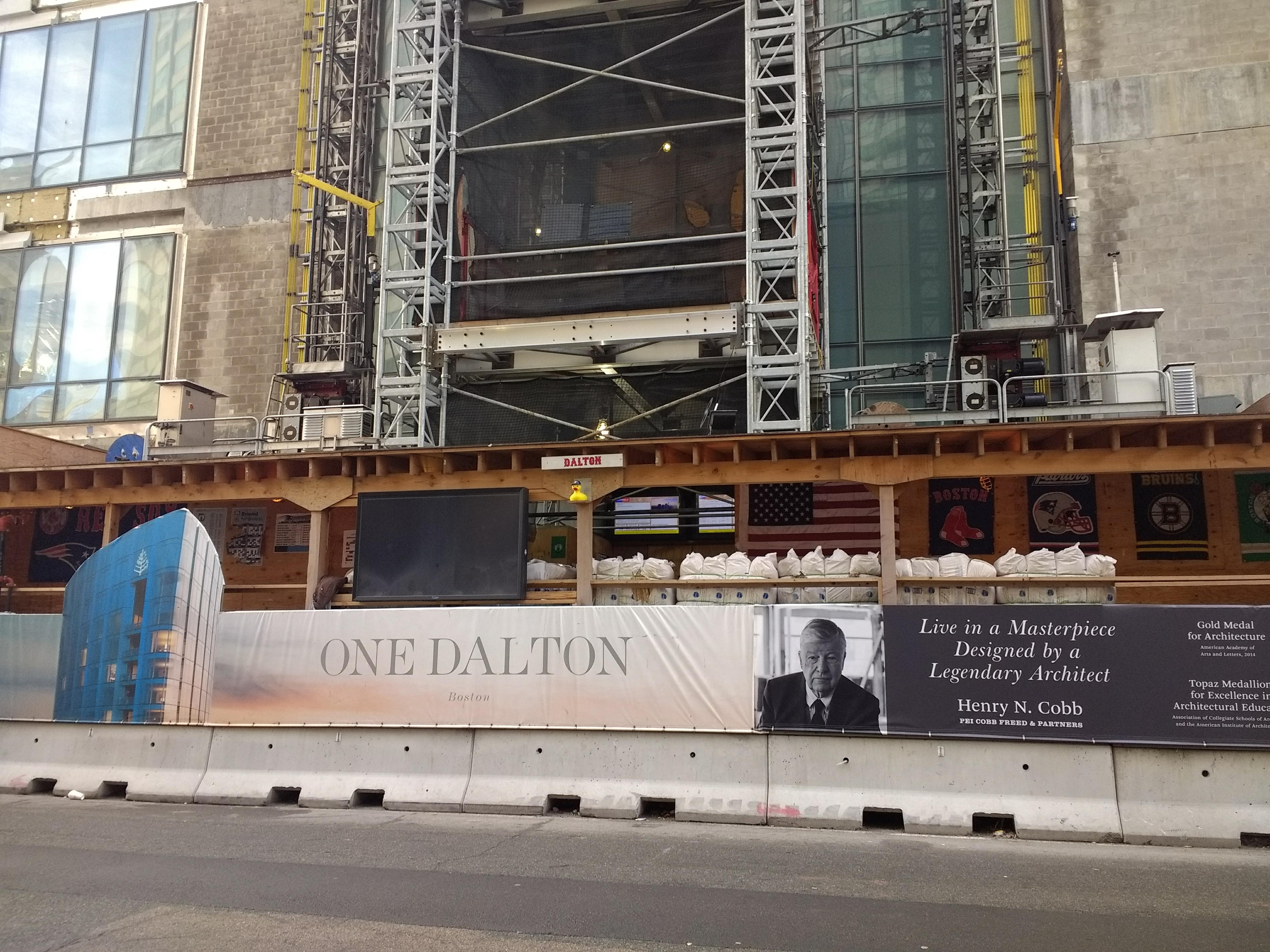
December 2018 street level construction of One Dalton.

== See also ==
- List of tallest buildings in Boston
