= One Beacon Street =

Office building in Boston, Massachusetts

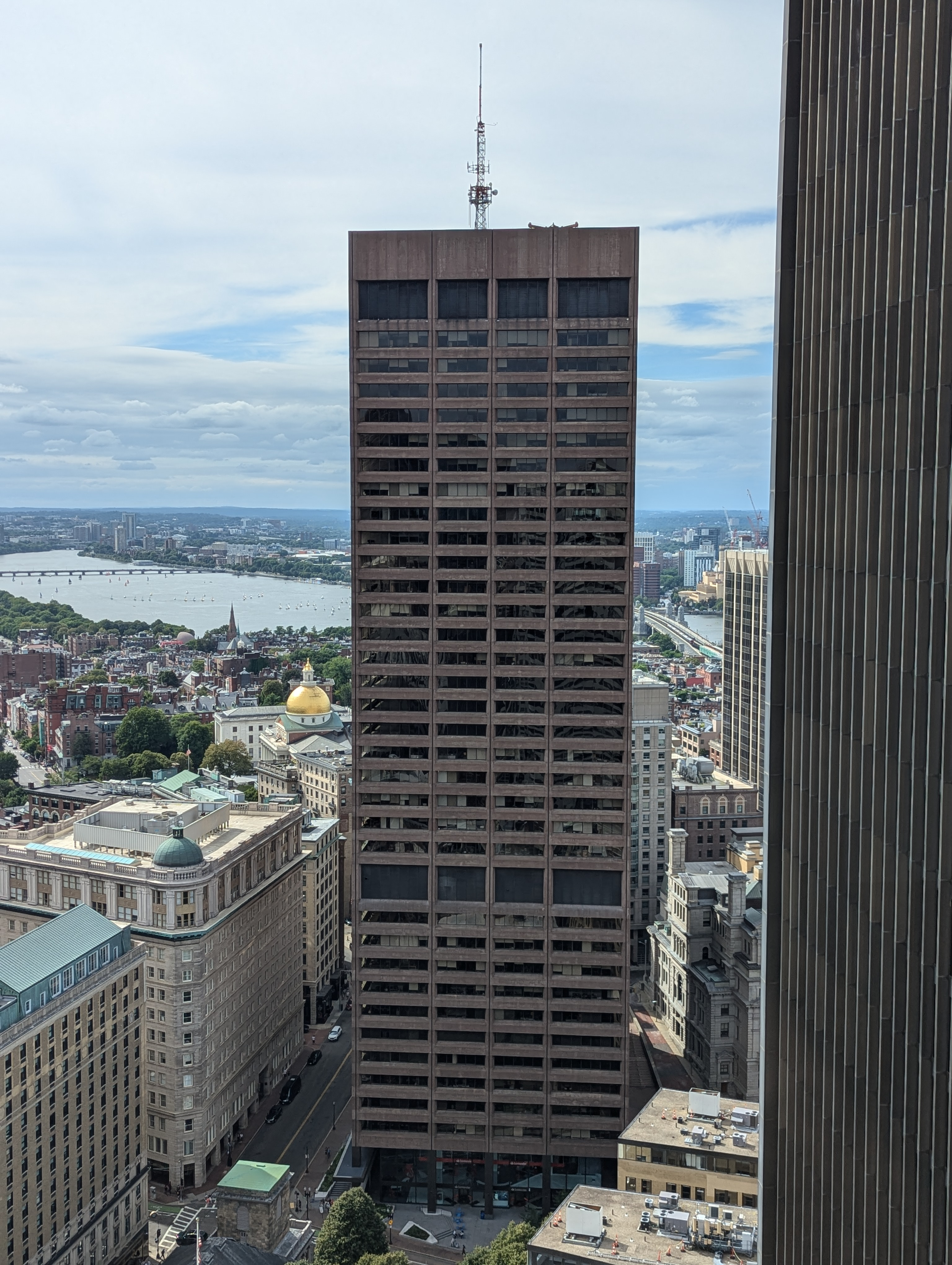
- Interactive map of the One Beacon Street area

General information
- Type: Office
- Location: 1 Beacon Street, Boston, Massachusetts
- Coordinates: 42.35844°N 71.06083°W
- Completed: 1971

Height
- Antenna spire: 623 ft (190 m)
- Roof: 505 ft (154 m)

Technical details
- Floor count: 37

Design and construction
- Architect: Skidmore, Owings & Merrill
- Developer: Beacon Capital Partners

One Beacon Street is a modern skyscraper in the Government Center neighborhood of Boston, Massachusetts. Built in 1972 and refurbished in 1991, it is Boston's 21st-tallest building, standing 505 feet (154 m) tall, and housing 37 floors. Its position near the top of Beacon Hill gives the building a commanding presence, though it is located away from many other Boston skyscrapers.

The tower houses a broadcast mast on the roof, painted red and white. With its broadcast mast included, One Beacon Street is the 7th-tallest building in Boston (when measuring to pinnacle height), rising 623 feet (190 m). Apart from the mast, the roof of the building is flat and has no crown.

== Owners ==
In July 2014 MetLife and Norges Bank Investment Management announced that they paid approximately $561 million for the One Beacon Street office building.

== Tenants ==
- The United States Census Bureau Boston Regional Center is on the 7th Floor.
- Aberdeen Standard Investments is on the 34th Floor.
- WeWork is on the 15th floor.
- Northwestern Mutual, an American financial services mutual organization, occupies the 21st floor.
- Robert M. Currey & Associates, the independent risk management consulting firm, is on the 22nd floor.
- The Brattle Group is on the 26th floor.
- The UMass Club is on the 32nd floor.
- Architecture and design firm Gensler has a Boston studio on the 2nd and 3rd Floor.
- Architecture and design firm NBBJ has a Boston studio on the 5th Floor.
- Transportation engineering and planning firm Kittelson & Associates has an office on the 2nd floor.
- Lutron is on the 13th floor.

== See also ==
- List of tallest buildings in Boston
