= 33 Arch Street =

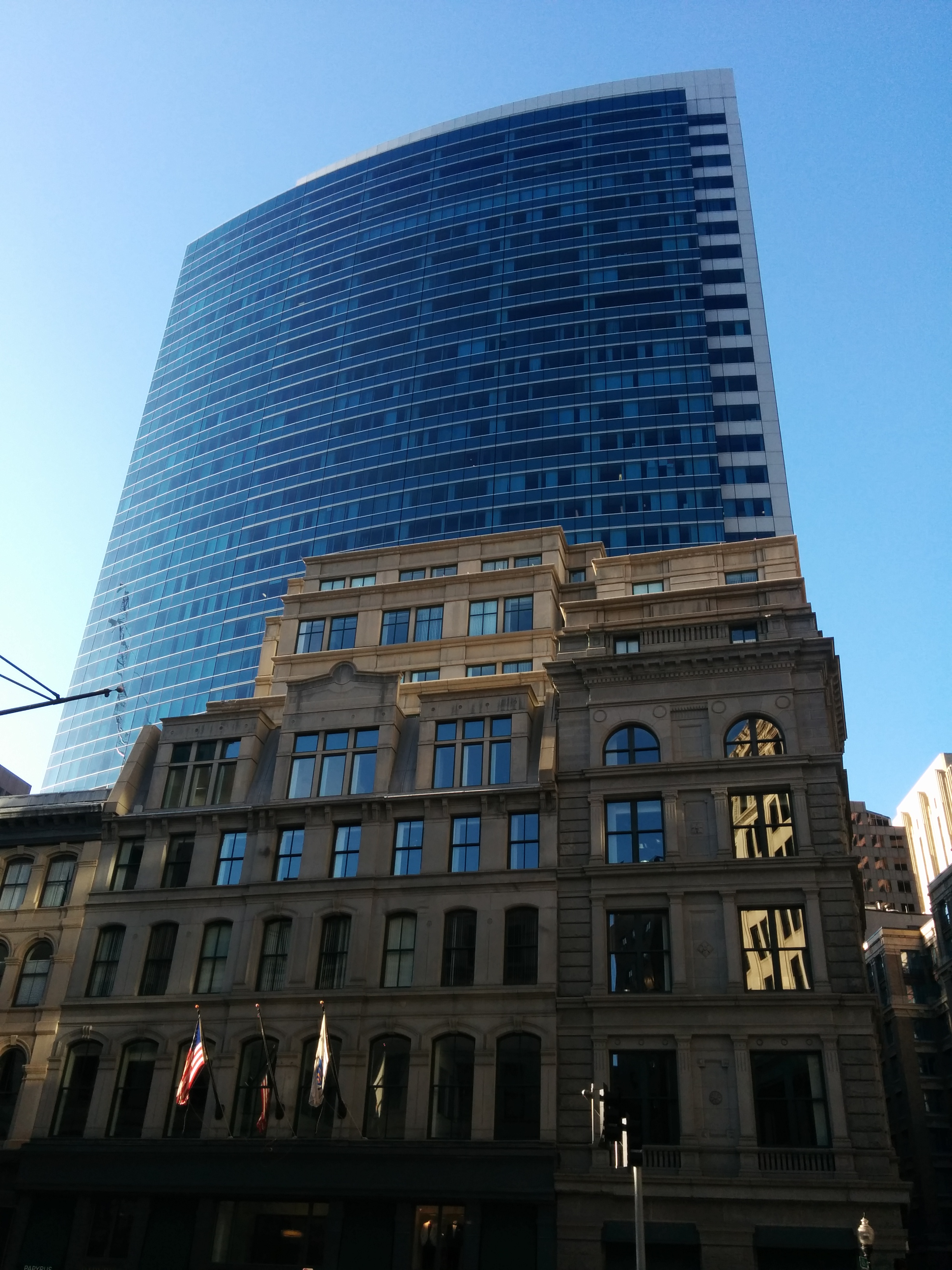
- 33 Arch Street in Boston
- Interactive map of the 33 Arch Street area

General information
- Status: Completed
- Type: Office building
- Architectural style: Postmodern architecture
- Location: 33 Arch Street, Boston, Massachusetts, U.S.
- Coordinates: 42.35596°N 71.05790°W
- Construction started: Jun 05, 2001
- Completed: Aug 04, 2004
- Owner: Nuveen Real Estate

Height
- Roof: 489 ft (149 m)

Technical details
- Floor count: 33
- Floor area: 603,309 sq ft (56,000 m^{2})

Design and construction
- Architect: Elkus / Manfredi Architects Ltd.
- Developer: Congress Group Ventures

33 Arch Street is a contemporary highrise in the Financial District and Downtown Crossing neighborhoods of Boston, Massachusetts. The building was completed in 2004 after three years of construction, which began on June 5, 2001. It is Boston's 27th-tallest building, standing 489 feet (149 m) tall, and housing 33 floors. The 33rd floor is 392 feet (119 m) above grade and the top of the cooling tower screen is 429 feet (131 m) above grade. It was designed by Elkus Manfredi Architects.

== History ==
The builders had proposed a transparent glass building but ran into opposition from the historic Old South Meeting House.

When the building was completed, it had a hard time finding tenants due to an office space glut and stood vacant upon completion. By 2005, 56% of the office space was rented and the average rent on a monthly parking space was $350.

In March 2010, 33 Arch Street was awarded the LEED Gold designation from the U.S. Green Building Council. In November 2010, the building was selected as BOMA's 2010-2011 Outstanding Building of the Year in the 500,000-1 Million Square Feet category.

== Design and features ==
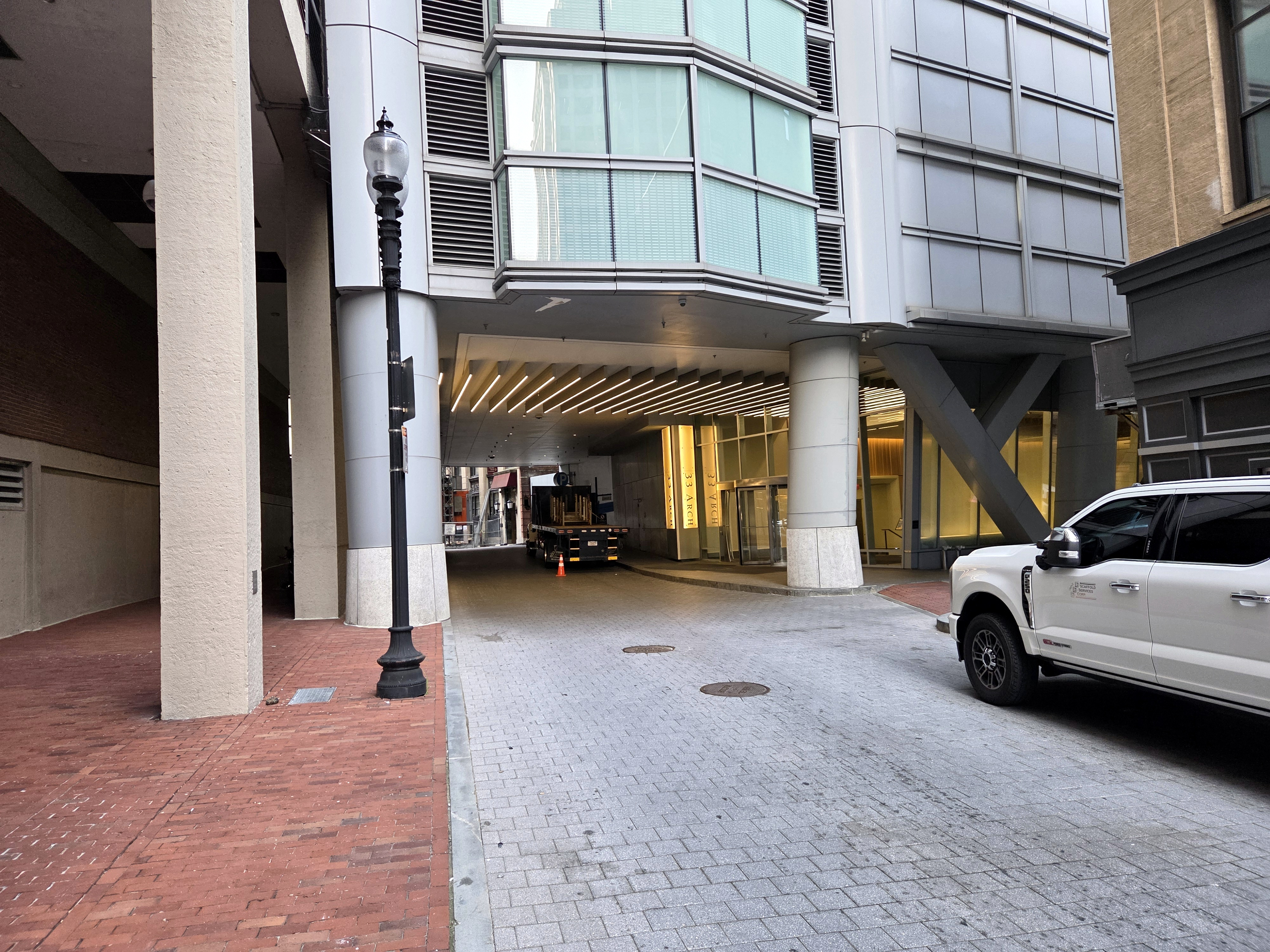
Hawley Street passing under the building

33 Arch Street has over 600,000 square feet (56,000 square metres) of office space and has 850 parking spaces in its underground parking garage. The building has a unique wing shape to maximize the use of the limited footprint.

The building facade includes gray granite, glass and aluminum cladding. Twenty floors cantilever over adjacent retail space and a garage, which is connected to parking on the first six levels. The roof has a distinctive top that sets it apart from nearby flat roofs in the skyline. It includes a curved penthouse and roof fins.

The building uses four levels of external bracing to transfer loads onto the small base. The bracing continues through the parking levels to the foundation; perimeter and internal moment frames act as the lateral system above the braced levels. The building was the first to be built in downtown Boston under new Safety Guidelines-Subpart R for steel.

== Tenants ==
- ACE Group
- Ameriprise Financial Services
- CBRE Group
- Databento
- Digitas
- DLA Piper
- IronMountain
- QuickPivot (formerly Extraprise)
- Securities and Exchange Commission
- United States Department of Education
- Weber Shandwick
- WeWork

== See also ==
- List of tallest buildings in Boston
