= State Street Bank Building =

Office building in Boston, Massachusetts

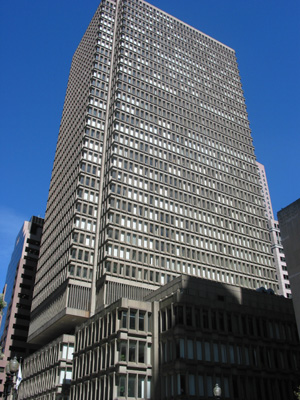
- Interactive map of the State Street Bank Building area

General information
- Type: Office
- Location: 225 Franklin Street, Boston, Massachusetts
- Coordinates: 42.35622°N 71.05418°W
- Completed: 1966

Height
- Roof: 477 ft (145 m)

Technical details
- Floor count: 33

Design and construction
- Architect: F.A. Stahl & Associates
- Developer: EQ Office

State Street Bank Building, also known as 225 Franklin Street, is a high-rise office building located in the Financial District, Boston, Massachusetts. The building stands at 477 feet (145 meters) with 33 floors and was completed in 1966. It is the 29th-tallest building in Boston. The architectural firm who designed the building was F.A. Stahl & Associates. State Street Bank Building was one of the first skyscrapers to be built in Boston after the completion of the Prudential Tower in 1964. The building gained its name from the prominent "State Street Bank" lettering present at the top of the building for many years, although the sign has since been taken down. A similar "State Street" sign was subsequently placed at One Lincoln Street.

In 2009, Fish & Richardson agreed to lease space in One Marina Park in South Boston as its new headquarters and abandon its current headquarters at the State Street Bank Building. Subsequently, it moved to One Marina Park in 2010.

== See also ==
- List of tallest buildings in Boston
