= McCormack Building =

Office building in Boston, Massachusetts

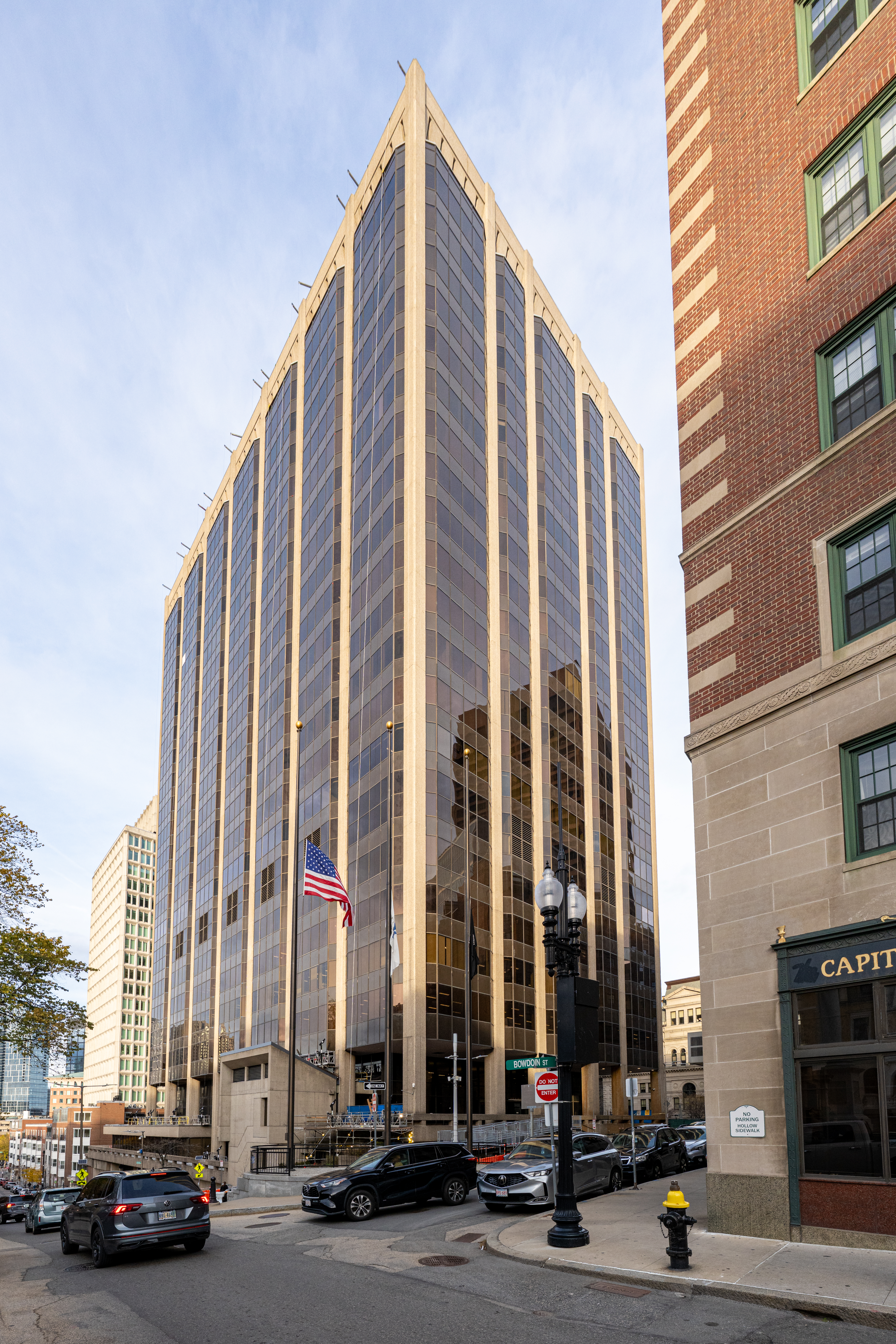
- Interactive map of the McCormack Building area

General information
- Status: Completed
- Type: Office
- Location: 1 Ashburton Place, Boston, Massachusetts
- Coordinates: 42.359527°N 71.062333°W
- Construction started: 1972
- Completed: 1975

Height
- Roof: 322 ft (98 m)

Technical details
- Floor count: 22
- Floor area: 649,989 sq ft (60,386.0 m^{2})

Design and construction
- Architect: Hoyle, Doran & Berry
- Developer: Vappi & Company, Inc.

The John W. McCormack State Office Building, also referred to by its address 1 Ashburton Place, is a high-rise building adjacent to the Beacon Hill neighborhood in Boston, Massachusetts. The building stands at 322 feet (98 m) with 22 floors. Construction began in 1972 and was completed in 1975. It is the 63rd-tallest building in Boston. The architectural firm who designed the building was Hoyle, Doran & Berry. The McCormack Building is notable because of its distinctive black and white façade.

== Tenants ==
Some tenants of the office block include:

- Office of the Massachusetts Attorney General
- Massachusetts Civil Service Commission
- Office of the Comptroller
- Division of Capital Asset Management & Maintenance
- Executive Office of Education
- Massachusetts Department of Higher Education
- Massachusetts Executive Office of Technology Services and Security
- Office of the Commissioner of Probation
- Massachusetts State Police H-1 Government Center Barracks

== See also ==
- List of tallest buildings in Boston
