= Avalon North Station =

Residential building in Boston

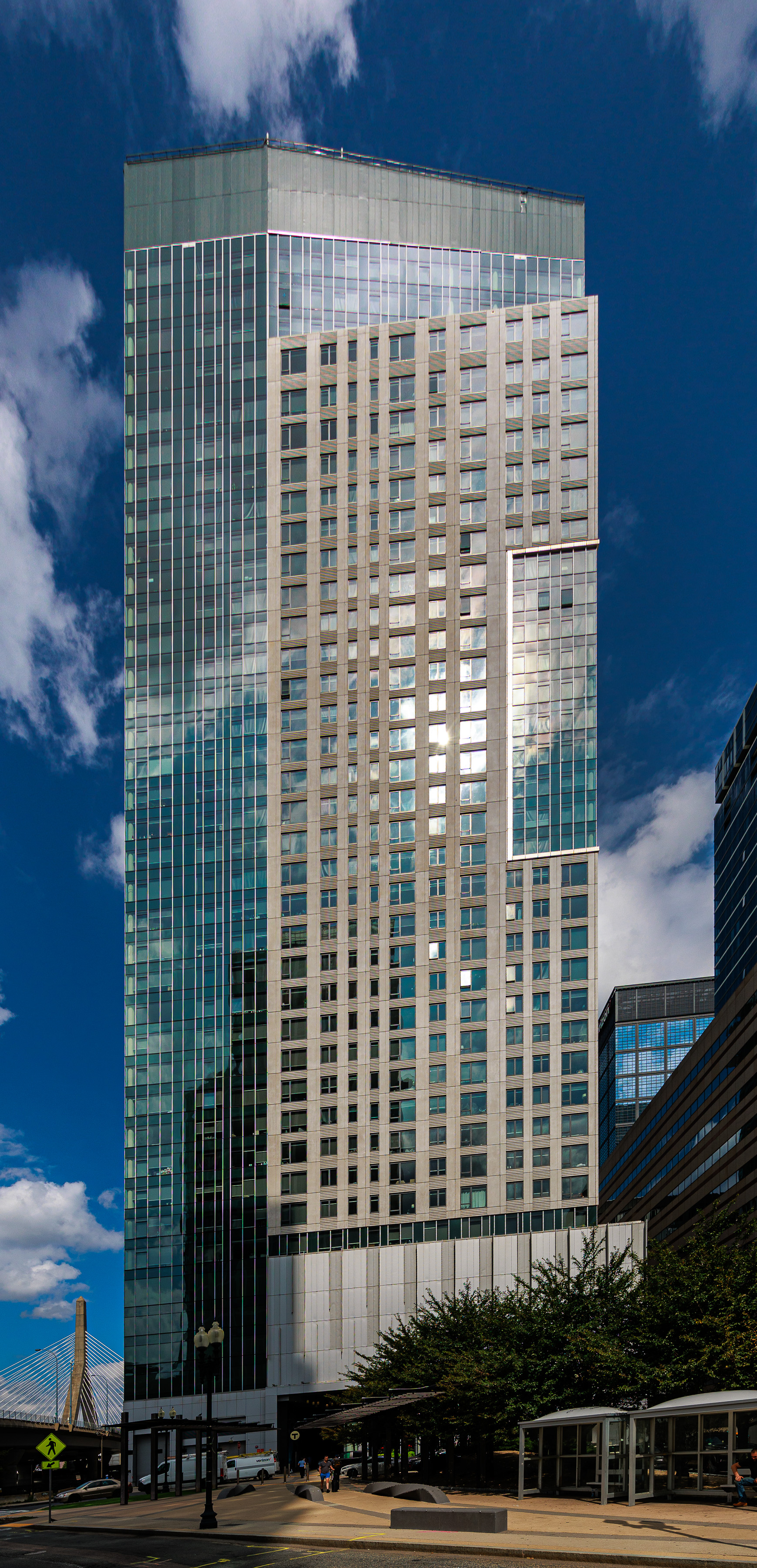
- Interactive map of the Avalon North Station area

General information
- Status: Completed
- Type: Residential
- Location: One Nashua Street, Boston, Massachusetts, U.S.
- Coordinates: 42.365911°N 71.063496°W
- Construction started: October 27, 2014
- Completed: November 3, 2016

Height
- Roof: 449 feet (137 m)

Technical details
- Floor count: 38

Design and construction
- Architect: CBT Architects
- Developer: AvalonBay Communities

Avalon North Station is a 38-story, 449 feet (137 m) residential skyscraper in Boston, Massachusetts, United States. The high-rise is built adjacent to the North Station transportation hub. The property contains 503 studio, one, two, and three-bedroom apartments.

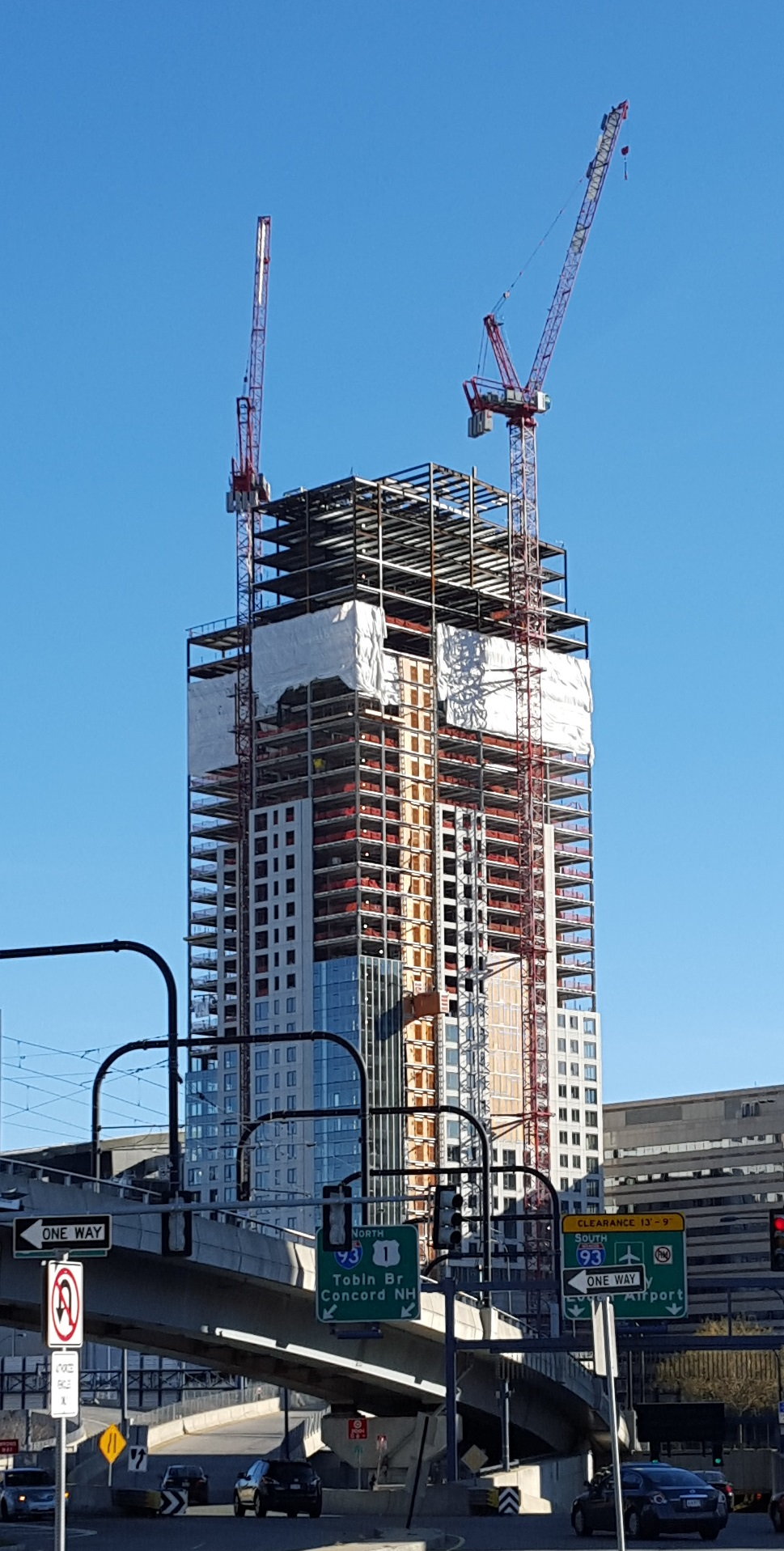
Under construction December 2015

== See also ==
- List of tallest buildings in Boston
