= TRO (company) =

TRO is a healthcare design firm headquartered in Boston, Massachusetts. The firm has a multidisciplinary service offering of architecture, engineering and interior design. TRO celebrated its 100th anniversary in 2009.

In January 2018, TRO was acquired by SmithGroupJJR.

== Awards ==
- Building Design + Construction, "Building Team Awards- Gold Award Winner," MaineGeneral Medical Center Alfond Center for Health, 2014
- Engineering News Record (ENR), "Best Healthcare Project Award - New England Region," MaineGeneral Medical Center Alfond Center for Health, 2014
- Building Design + Construction, "Building Team Awards- Bronze Award Winner," Lawrence + Memorial Hospital Cancer Center, 2014
- Building Design + Construction, "Collaborators Team Award- Recognized Project," Lawrence + Memorial Hospital Cancer Center, 2014
- Engineering News Record (ENR), "Healthcare Project Merit Award - New York Region," Lawrence + Memorial Hospital Cancer Center, 2014
- The Real Estate Exchange (Connecticut Chapter of CREW), “Blue Ribbon Award,” Saint Francis Hospital and Medical Center John T. O’Connell Tower Phase II, 2012
- Associated General Contractors (AGC) of Connecticut, “Award for Excellence,” Saint Francis Hospital and Medical Center John T. O’Connell Tower Phase II, 2012
- Brick in Architecture Awards, "Best in Class for Health Care," - Methodist Le Bonheur Germantown Hospital's Women's and Children's Pavilion, 2011
- Illuminating Engineering Society (IES), "Illumination Award of Merit," MaineGeneral Medical Center Alfond Center for Cancer care, 2009
