= One Boston Place =

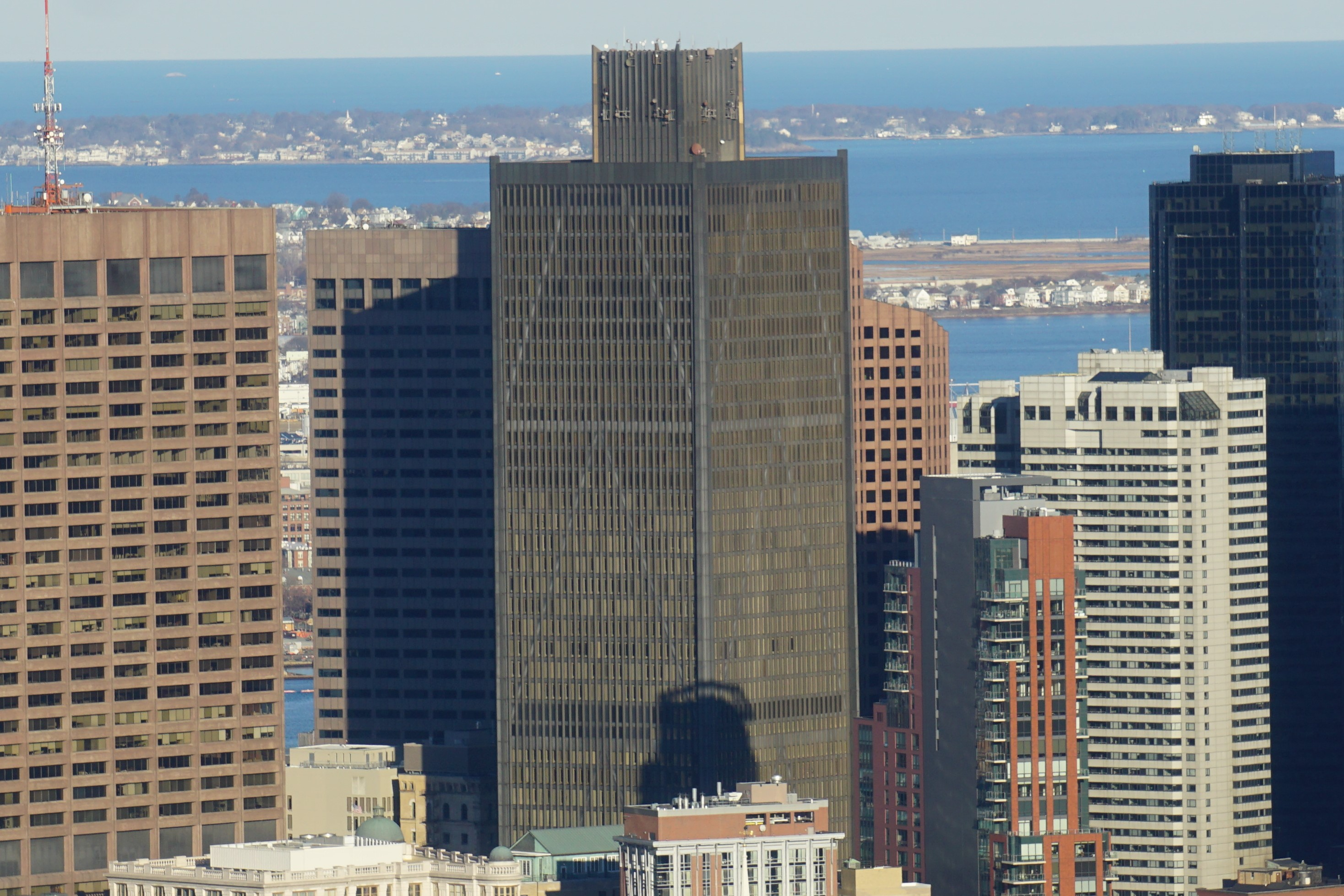
- Interactive map of the One Boston Place area

General information
- Status: Completed
- Type: Office
- Location: 201 Washington Street, Boston, Massachusetts
- Coordinates: 42.35853°N 71.05838°W
- Completed: 1970

Height
- Roof: 601 ft (183 m)

Technical details
- Floor count: 41
- Floor area: 825,000 sq ft (76,600 m^{2})

Design and construction
- Architects: Pietro Belluschi, Emery Roth & Sons
- Developer: Cabot, Cabot & Forbes

One Boston Place, also known as the Boston Company Building, is a 41-story office tower located in the Financial District of Boston, Massachusetts. With a height of 601 feet (183 meters), One Boston Place is the ninth-tallest building in the city. Despite its simple appearance, One Boston Place has become a major Boston landmark due to its distinctive diagonal exterior bracing and unusual rooftop "box" design. Completed in 1970, the skyscraper has served as home to several law, financial, real estate, and corporate firms. Bank of New York Mellon is currently (July 2007) the primary tenant of the building.

== History ==
Designed by architect Pietro Belluschi and developed by Cabot, Cabot & Forbes, construction of One Boston Place began in November 1967, and the first tenants occupied the building in March 1970.

== Design and features ==
One Boston Place has a steel frame construction with a masonry core. The building contains eighteen passenger elevators and one freight elevator, which were renovated in 2005. The lobby entrance features a planar glass wall system. The diagonal exterior bracing is characteristic of the architectural movement structural expressionism.

In October 2007, One Boston Place was recognized by the EPA's ENERGY STAR program.

In November 2008, One Boston Place became the first building in the world to earn a Gold level of certification through the US Green Building Council's LEED for Existing Buildings: Operations & Maintenance (LEED EB O&M) rating system. The building's environmental highlights include a highly reflective white roof and hardscape, the use of native vegetation on the building's plaza, and strong support of indoor air quality standards.

== See also ==
- List of tallest buildings in Boston

== Gallery ==
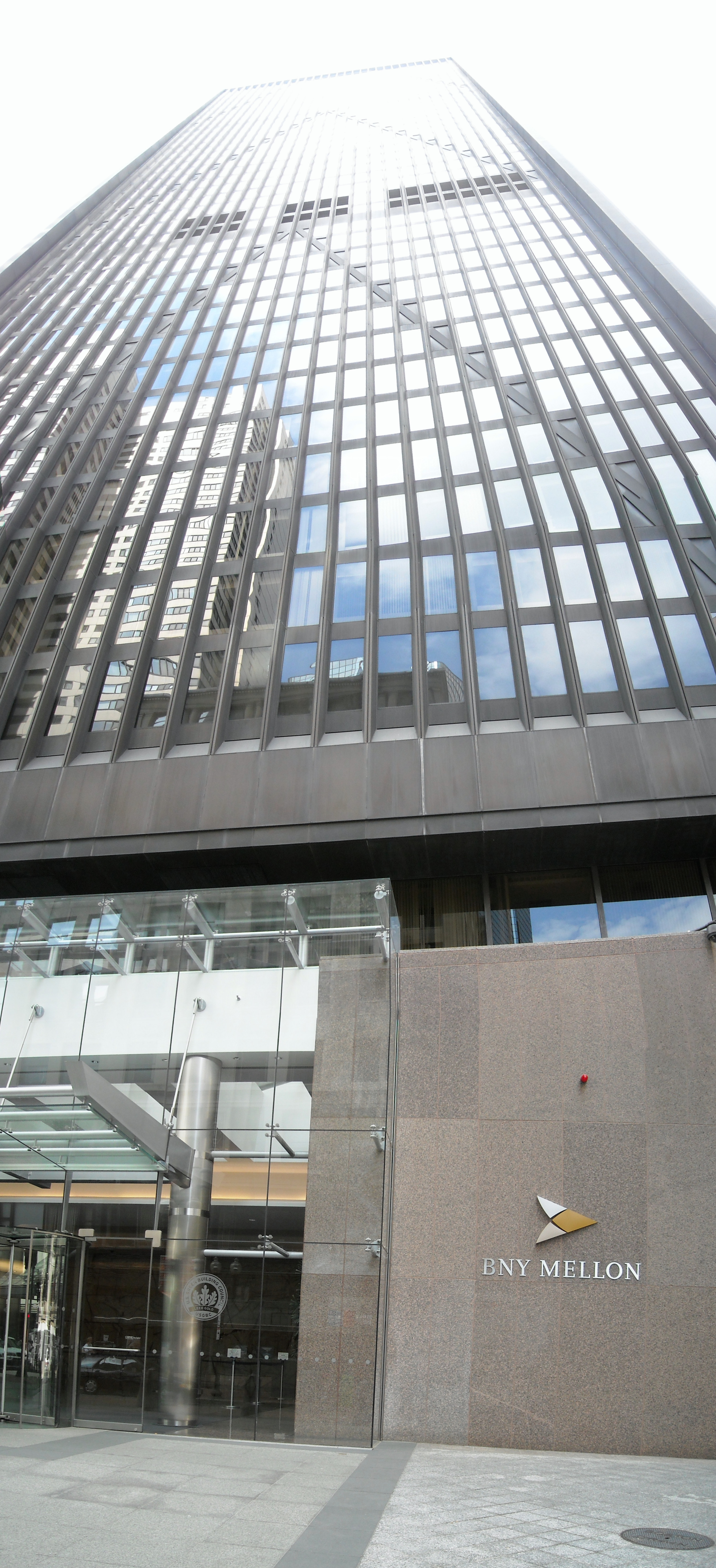
Viewed from the base

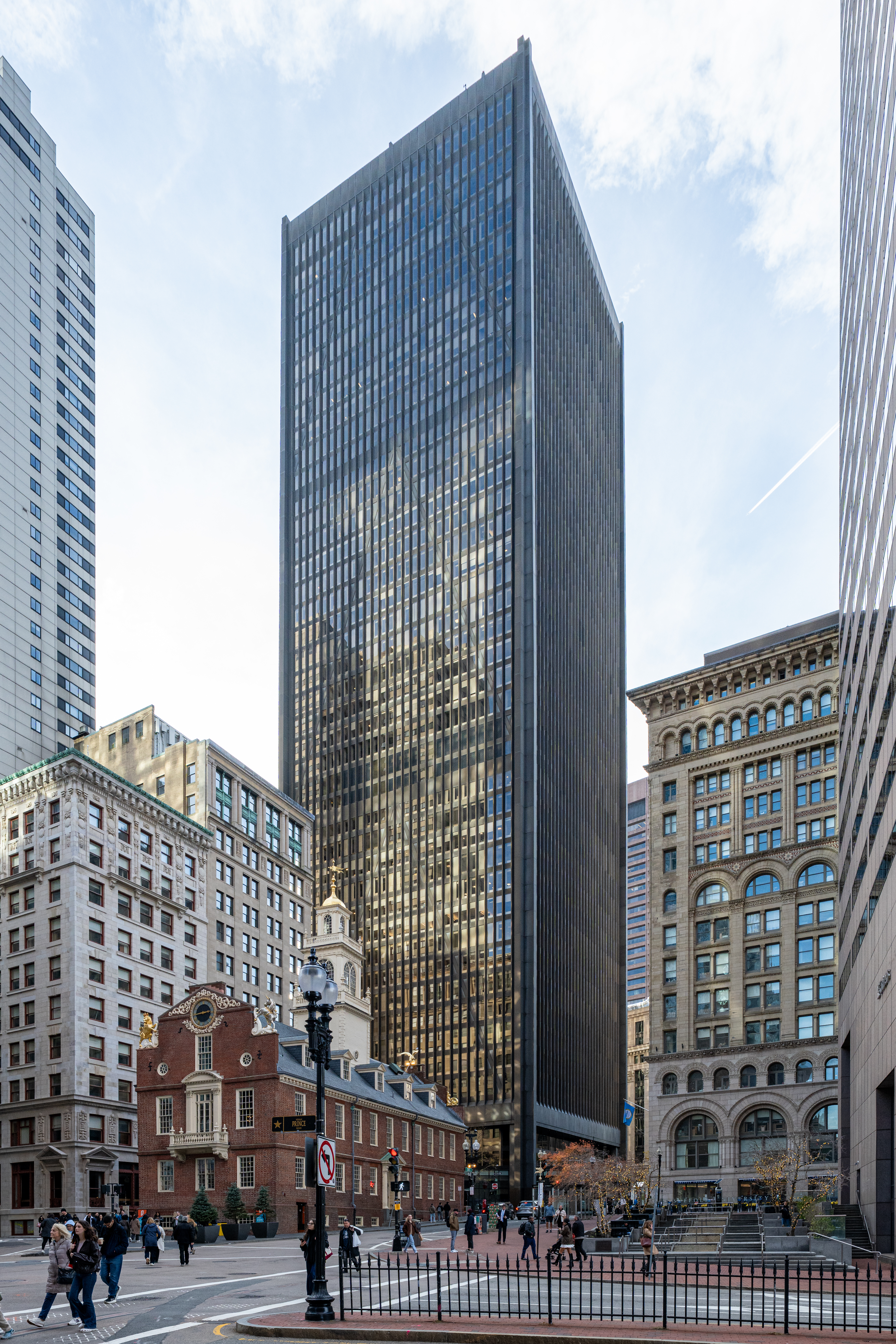
Viewed from State Street, with the Old State House directly in front

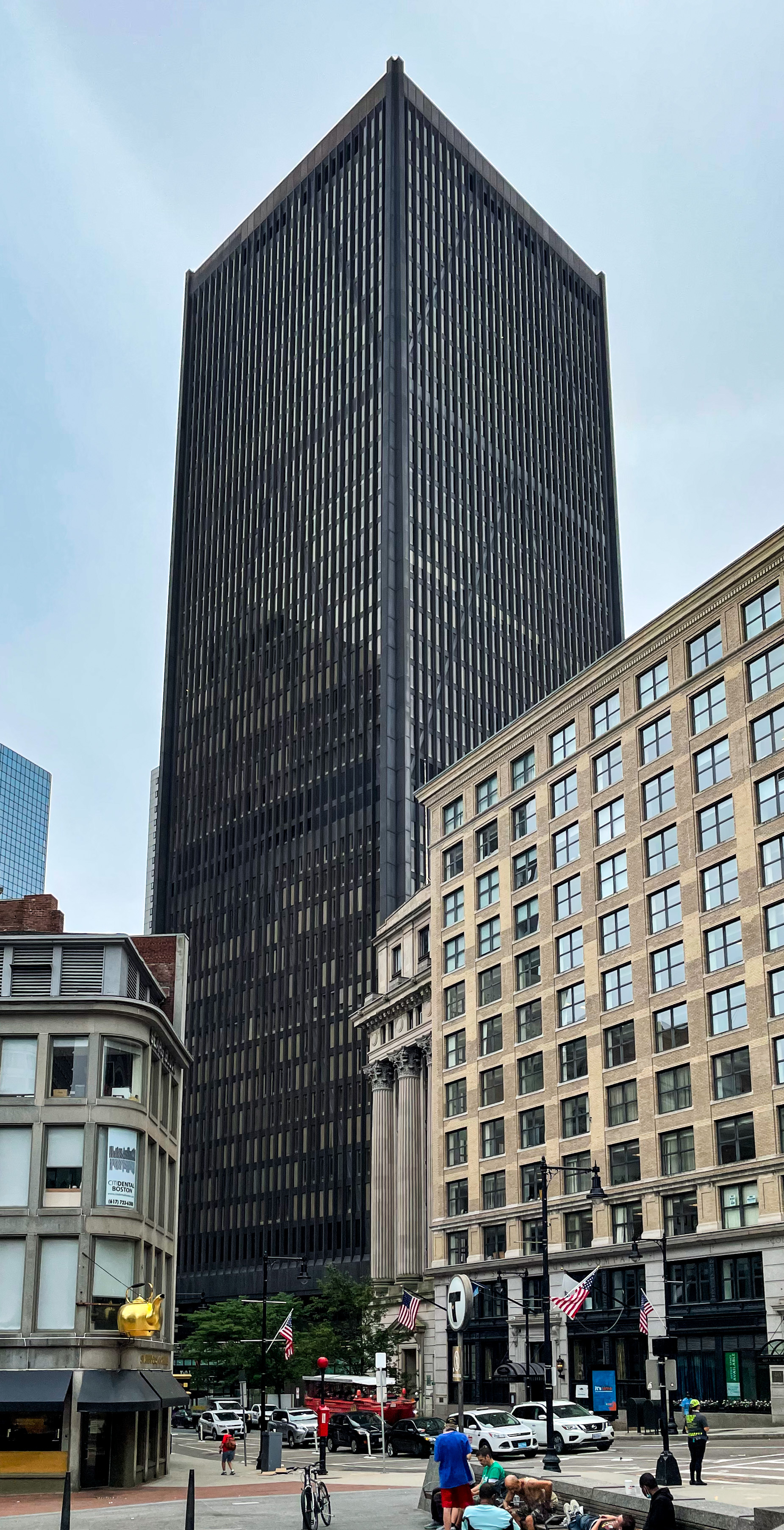
Viewed from Government Center
