= Liberty Mutual Tower =

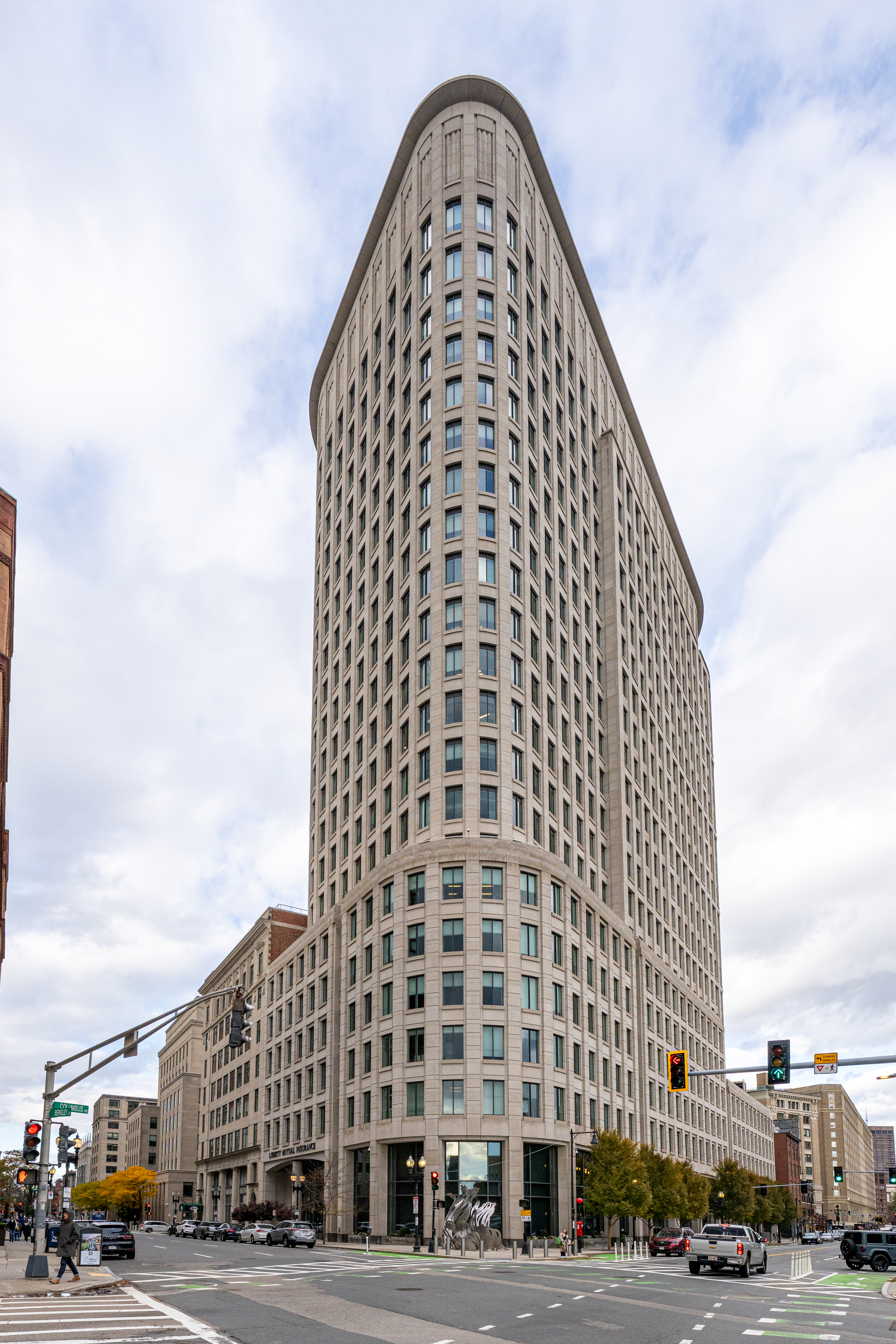
- Liberty Mutual Tower (2025)

- Location within Boston

General information
- Type: Office
- Location: 157 Berkeley St. Boston, Massachusetts
- Coordinates: 42°20′57.8″N 71°4′19.6″W
- Construction started: 2011
- Completed: 2013
- Cost: $300 Million

Height
- Roof: 290 feet (88 m)

Technical details
- Floor count: 22

Design and construction
- Architect: Childs Bertman Tseckares Inc.

The Liberty Mutual Tower, located at 157 Berkeley Street, is a skyscraper in the Back Bay neighborhood of Boston, Massachusetts. The 22-story building houses the world headquarters of Liberty Mutual Insurance Group, standing 290 feet (88 m) tall. The tower cost more than $300 million, and is built in the shape of a triangle, similar to the Flatiron Building. The building's outer appearance is traditional, but the interior is finished with modern architectural touches.

The building is part of an interconnected complex in which the interior of several buildings can be reached without going outside. This includes the former American headquarters of Salada Tea which was built in the early 1917.

== Artworks ==
A stainless steel abstract sculpture, entitled "Uplift" by New York artist Mia Pearlman, is located outside at street level in front of the building's triangular point, with related sculptural elements visible inside the building lobby.
