= Pierce Boston =

Coordinates: 42.343772°N 71.101725°W

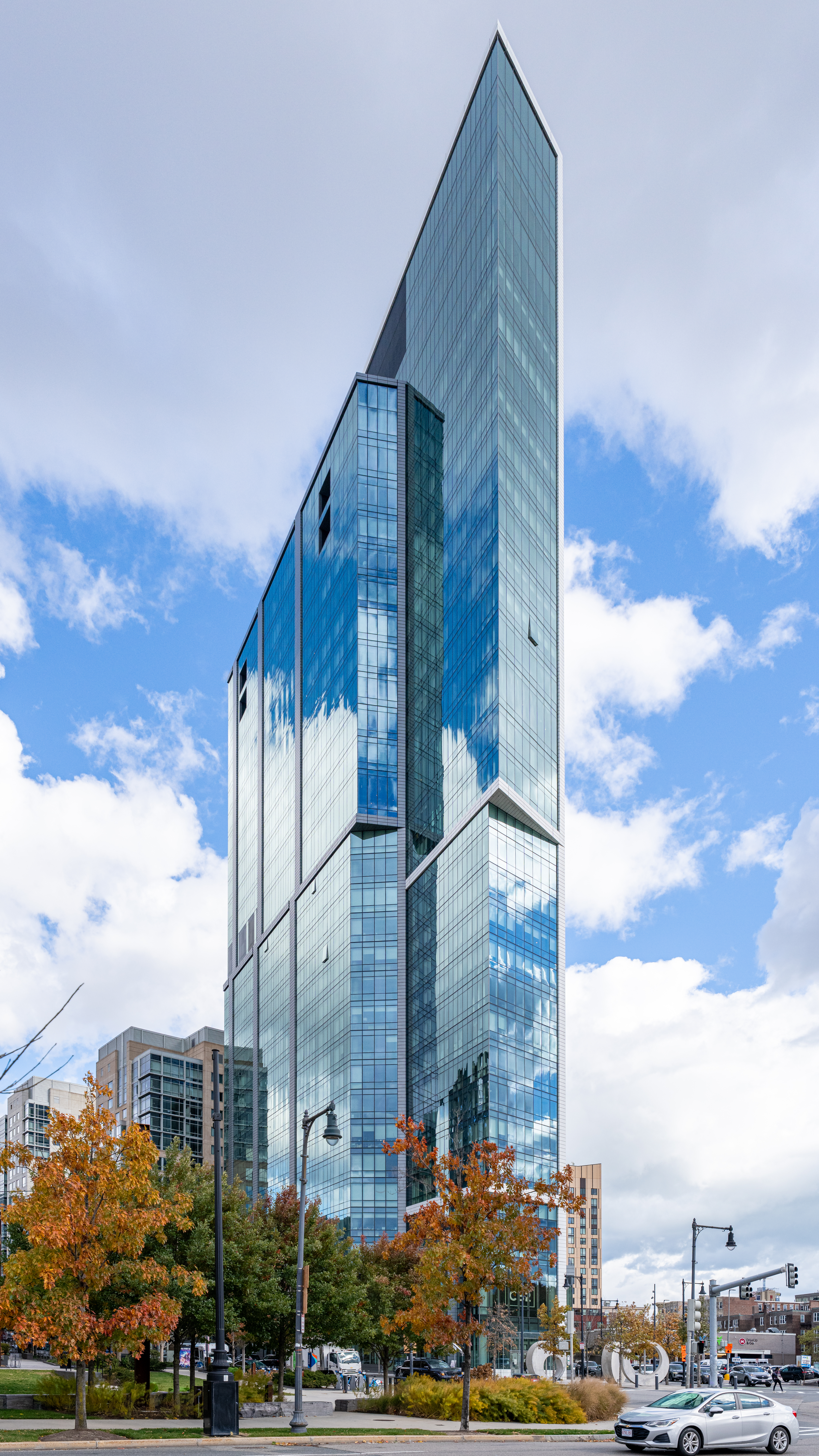
- Pierce Boston, November 2025
- Interactive map of the Pierce Boston area

General information
- Status: Completed
- Type: Mixed-Use
- Location: 188 Brookline Ave; Boston, MA
- Construction started: 2015
- Completed: 2018
- Cost: $300 Million

Technical details
- Floor count: 30
- Lifts/elevators: 5

Design and construction
- Architects: Arquitectonica, CBT Architects
- Developer: Samuels and Associates, Landsea, Weiner Ventures
- Structural engineer: McNamara Salvia Structural Engineers

Pierce Boston is a residential apartment and condo building located in the Fenway–Kenmore neighborhood of Boston, Massachusetts (USA), at the corner of Boylston Street and Brookline Avenue. The 30-story mixed-use development includes luxury condo, apartment, and retail components. It is the tallest building in the neighborhood. The name Pierce was chosen as it is the former location of gourmet supermarket S.S. Pierce.

== Design ==
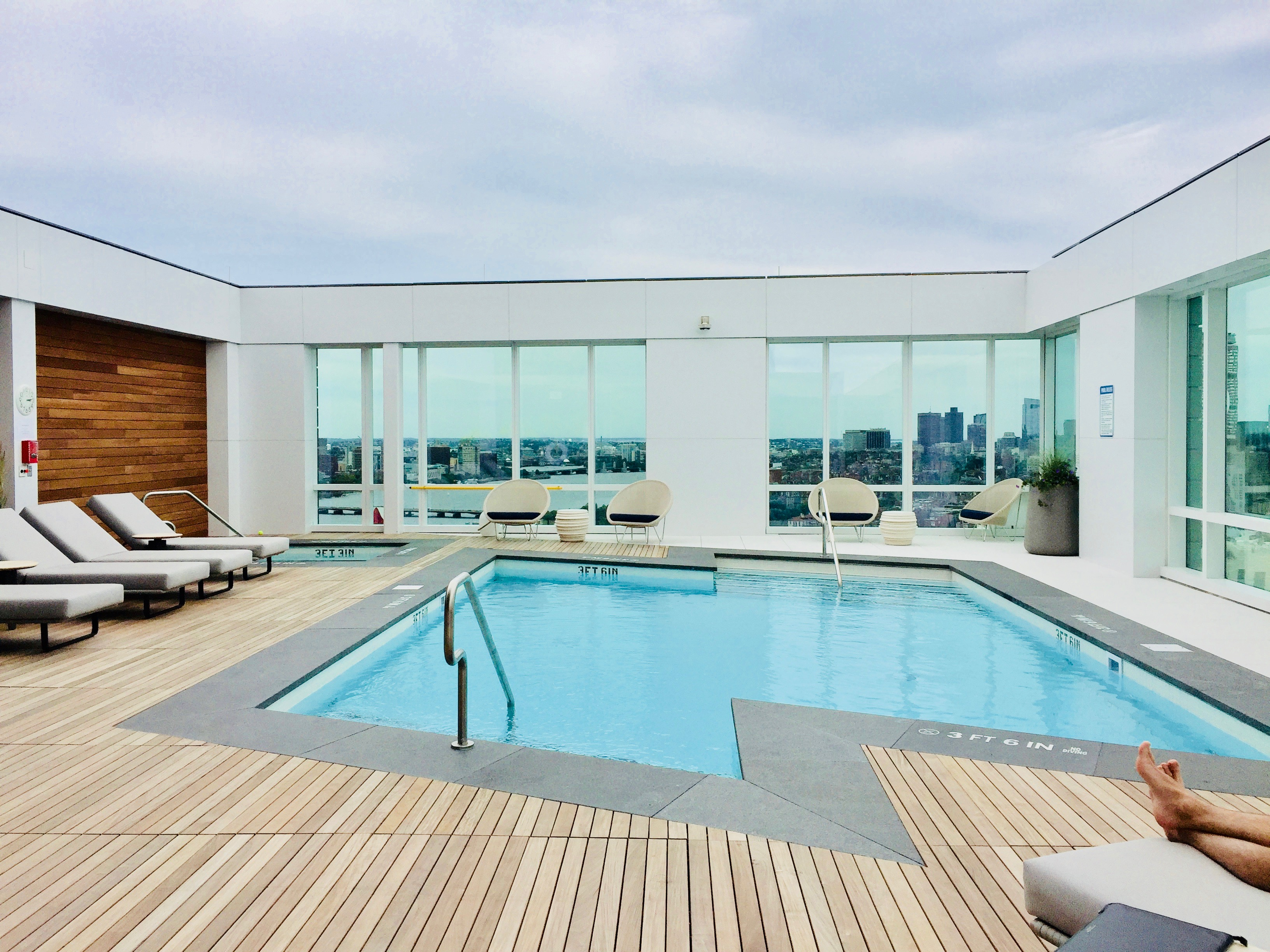
Roof-top pool deck

The building was originally proposed by Samuels & Associates in 2013 as a 22-story residential tower called The Point. It was the first Boston project by the Miami-based architecture firm Arquitectonica. The building is clad in glass and metal, with paneling in a pattern intended to reflect the masonry buildings around it.

The building contains retail space (floors 1–2), 240 apartments (floors 3–17), and 109 condominiums (floors 19–29). The 30th-floor level includes outdoor roof space, with a pool and hot tub for apartment and condo residents, a lounge and barbecue area for condo owners, and private roof decks for individual condos.

The retail space is home to a CB2, Mida, The Wine Press, and Nathalie Wine Bar.
