= Duan Family Center for Computing & Data Sciences =

Building in the Boston University Campus

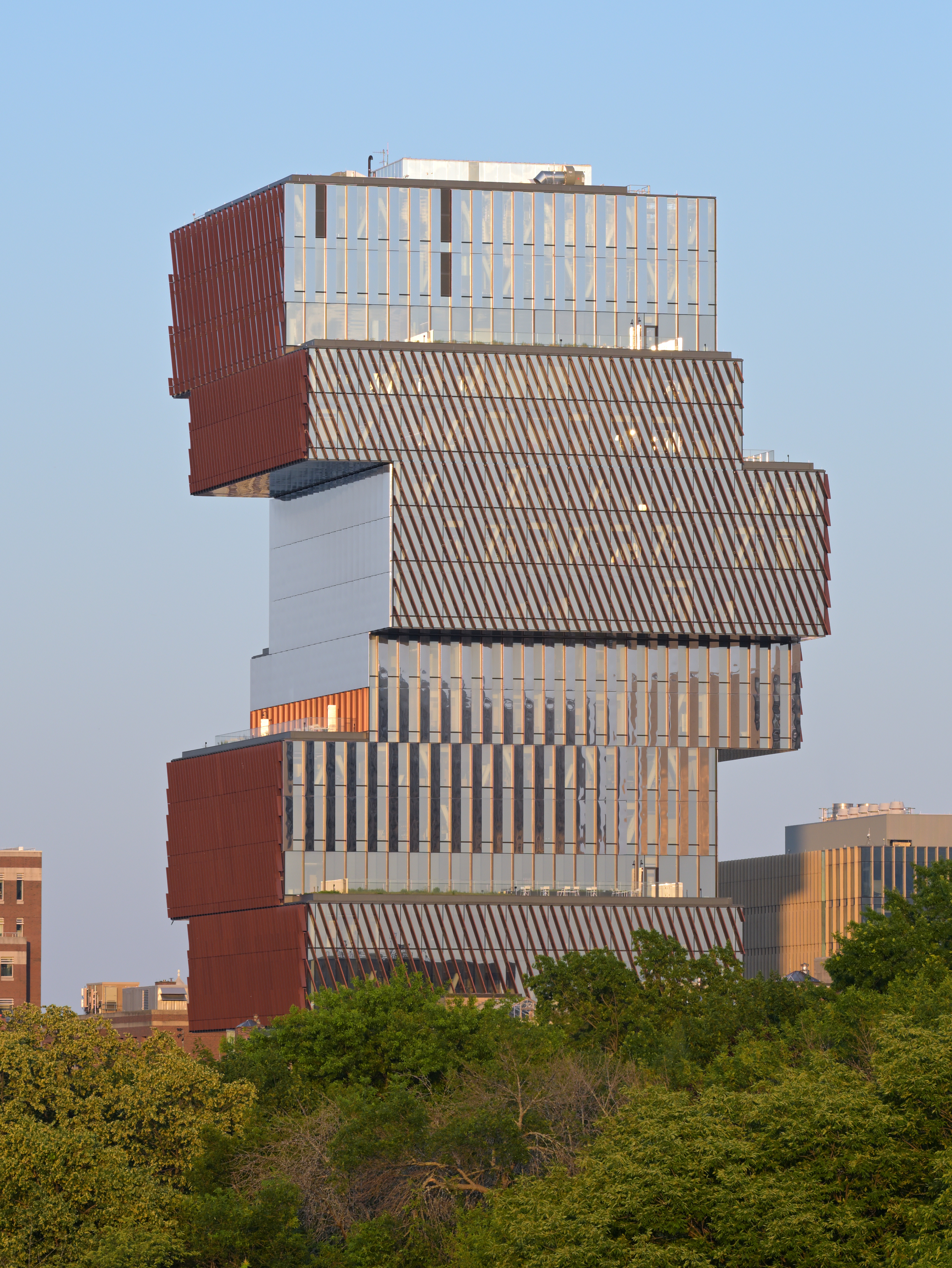
- The Center as seen from the BU Bridge in June 2025
- Interactive map of the Duan Family Center for Computing & Data Sciences area

General information
- Location: 665 Commonwealth Ave; Boston, Massachusetts; 02215
- Coordinates: 42°21′00″N 71°06′11″W
- Groundbreaking: December 5, 2019
- Completed: December 8, 2022
- Cost: $305 million
- Owner: Boston University

Height
- Height: 305 ft (93 m)

Technical details
- Floor count: 19
- Floor area: 345,000 square feet (32,052 m^{2})

Design and construction
- Architects: Luigi LaRocca; Paulo Rocha
- Architecture firm: KPMB Architects

Website
- Duan Center for Computing and Data Sciences

The Duan Family Center for Computing & Data Sciences (CCDS), formerly known as the Boston University Center for Computing & Data Sciences, and often referred to as the "Jenga Tower", is a 19-story, 305 ft (93 m) building located on the campus of Boston University. Designed by KPMB Architects, it was completed on December 8, 2022. It is noted for being the largest net-zero building in Boston, relying on geothermal heating and cooling, while using wind power for all the electricity in the building.

== Architecture ==
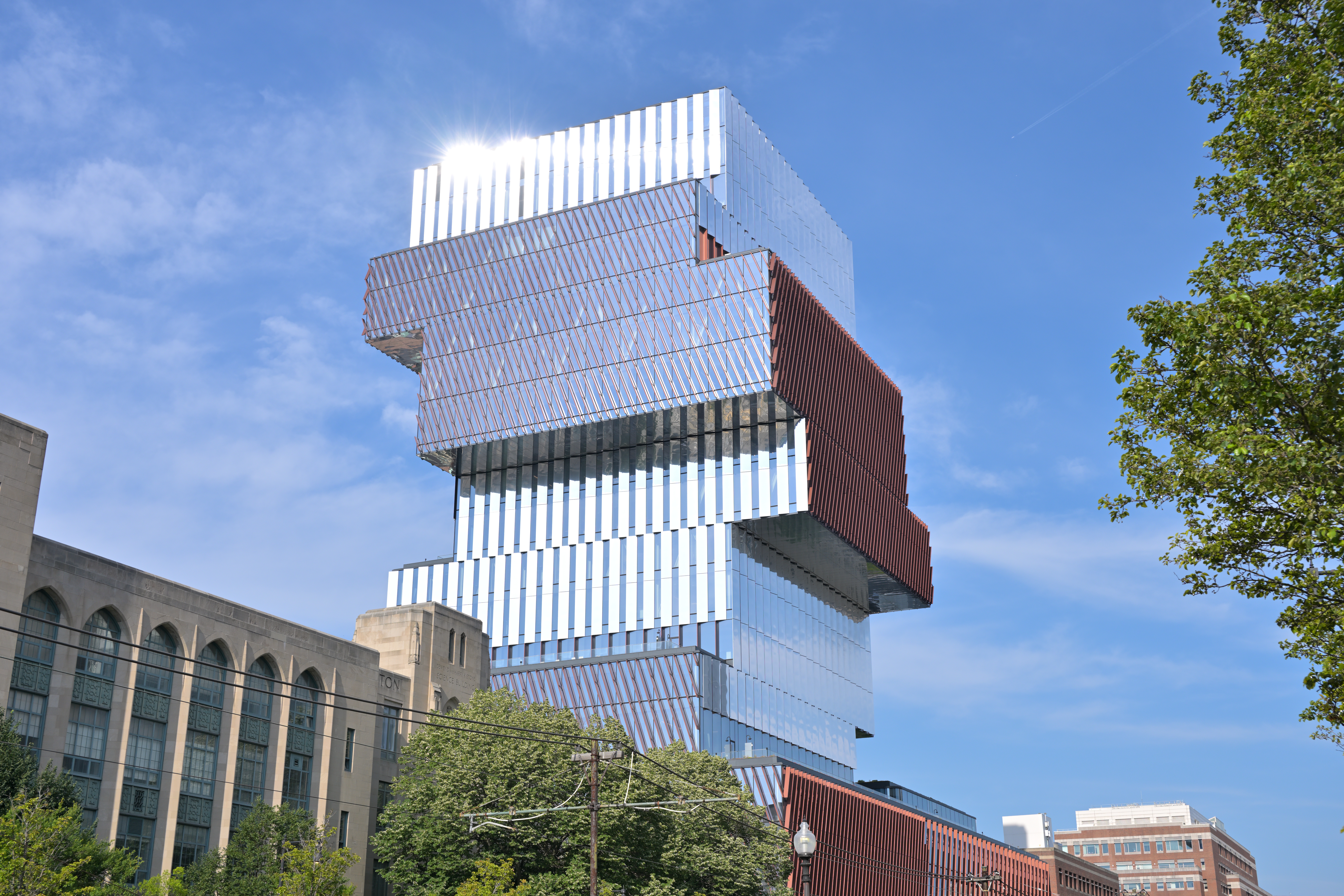
The Center as seen from Commonwealth Avenue, with the misaligned blocks visible.

The building's stacked blocks have earned it the nickname of the "Jenga Tower". The blocks internally serve as different "academic neighborhoods," and were built with the intention of avoiding the appearance of a typical office building on the inside.

There are many whiteboards built into the walls to encourage "collaboration".

=== Sustainability ===
The center is a net-zero building, and has a LEED Platinum certification. It uses geothermal heating and cooling, with geothermal wells that extend approximately 1,500 feet (460 m) into the ground.

For electricity, the university purchases wind energy, which they say offsets its emissions in Boston, and will help achieve their 2040 university-wide carbon neutral goal.

The building was designed to avoid flooding; it was built 5 feet (1.5 m) above the City of Boston's suggested design guidelines for sea level rise.

== History ==
After the university acquired $100 million in research funding for their Computing & Data Sciences programs, then-President of the university Robert A. Brown announced that the center would be built.

Before the center was built, the site was home to a Burger King, and the project was thus referred to internally as "BK".

On December 5, 2019, the university broke ground on the building. The site was live streamed throughout the construction period. A ribbon cutting ceremony was held on December 8, 2022, and the building officially opened in January 2023.

In 2024, the building was renamed to add "Duan Family" following a donation from the parent of a former BU student.
