= Culture in Boston =

Culture in American city

The culture of Boston, Massachusetts, shares many roots with greater New England, including a dialect of the Eastern New England accent popularly known as Boston English. The city has its own unique slang, which has existed for many years. Boston was, and is still, a major destination of Irish immigrants. Irish Americans are a major influence on Boston's politics and religious institutions and consequently on the rest of Massachusetts.

Many consider Boston a highly cultured city, perhaps as a result of its intellectual reputation. Mark Twain once wrote of it, "In New York, they ask, 'How much money does he have?' In Philadelphia, they ask, 'Who were his parents?' In Boston they ask, 'How much does he know?'" Much of Boston's culture originates at its universities.

== Performing arts ==
The Washington Street Theatre District, south of Boston Common, contains a number of ornate theatres, including the Boston Opera House, the Cutler Majestic Theatre and The Citi Performing Arts Center. The most prominent professional theater companies are located at the American Repertory Theater in Cambridge and at the Huntington Theatre, but small companies and theaters are scattered throughout the city, including at the Boston Center for the Arts and the Calderwood Pavilion in Boston's South End. The Boston Ballet is a world-renowned classical dance company. Street performers can be found in and around Quincy Market near Faneuil Hall. Every summer, the Commonwealth Shakespeare Company offers open-air performances free to the public on the Boston Common.

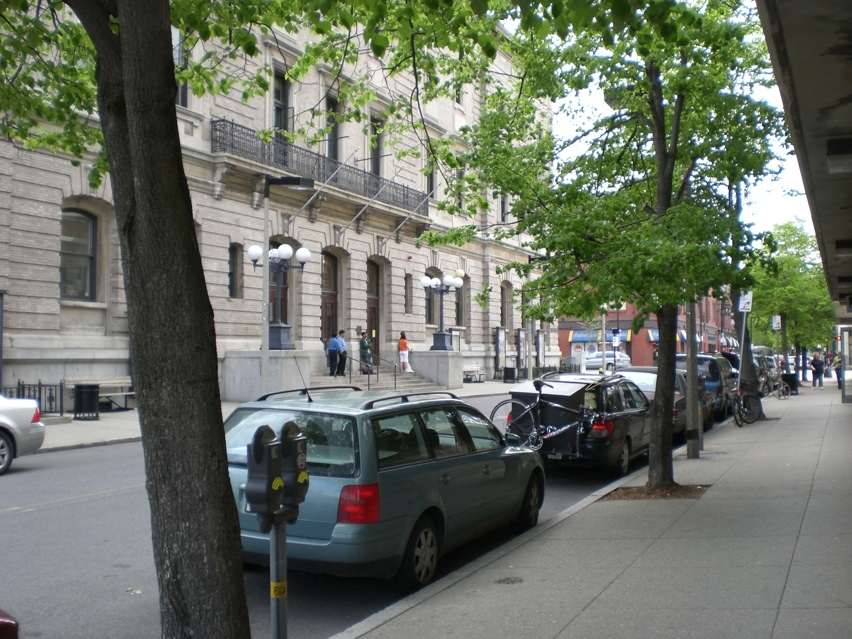
Outside view of Jordan Hall, an important Boston concert venue located at The New England Conservatory

Boston is also home to a wide array of music - from bands like Boston and Aerosmith - to the world-renowned Boston Symphony Orchestra, the famed Boston Pops, the Boston Symphony Chamber Players, the Boston Philharmonic, the Boston Chamber Music Society, Boston Lyric Opera Company, Boston Modern Orchestra Project, Opera Boston, the Celebrity Series of Boston and the Handel and Haydn Society (one of the oldest choral company in the US). Major venues include Jordan Hall, Symphony Hall, and the Berklee Performance Center, as well as venues at each of the colleges and universities. Several important music schools are located in Boston, including the New England Conservatory for classical and jazz music, the Boston Conservatory for classical music, dance, and musical theater, and the Berklee College of Music for jazz and a variety of contemporary music styles. Every two years, the city hosts the Boston Early Music Festival, an international gathering for people interested in historical music performance.

Pop music manager Maurice Starr launched the careers of popular 1980s boybands New Edition and New Kids on the Block, both of whom were based in Boston.

There are also countless lesser known local musicians, thanks to a thriving underground music scene. In contrast to what might be considered the more "refined" aspects of Boston's culture, the city is also one of the birthplaces of hardcore punk. Boston had one of the leading local ska-punk scenes in the ska revival of the mid-1990s with bands like The Mighty Mighty Bosstones, The Allstonians, and Skavoovie and the Epitones. The punk rock group Dropkick Murphys have had ties to both Boston professional sports teams, particularly the Boston Red Sox and Boston Bruins, and their music has appeared in some films early in the 21st century.

Boston was also the center of a thriving and influential indie rock, college rock, post-punk and new wave scenes throughout the 1980s and 1990s, including bands like The Cars, Pixies, 'Til Tuesday, Throwing Muses, Scruffy the Cat, Mission of Burma, The Lemonheads, Human Sexual Response, Galaxie 500, Damon & Naomi, Helium, The Pernice Brothers and Swirlies. Bands formed and located in the western part of Massachusetts in the college towns of Amherst and Northampton also had a major impact on the Boston music scene: important bands from western Massachusetts include Sebadoh, Dinosaur Jr., Buffalo Tom, and many others.

Boston is also known for its Hip Hop scene. Many rappers such as Guru of the rap duo Gang Starr, Big Shug, ED O.G. & Da Bulldogs, Mr. Lif, The Perceptionists, Benzino, 7L & Esoteric, Bia (rapper) and Special Teamz made this city famous for its urban music.

Actress and Latin pop singer Sasha Sokol relocated to Boston after leaving Timbiriche in the mid-1980s. Sokol recorded her solo debut album while still residing in Boston, only to return to Mexico City in order to do television work. Sasha remains the only Latin pop act to have been based in Boston.

Current music venues support a diverse array of live music throughout Boston. Venues support local bands, and showcase national touring acts. Clubs include The Middle East, T.T. the Bears, P.A.'s Lounge, Great Scott, and The Paradise (a larger venue). This scene is supported by local press including The Boston Phoenix and the Weekly Dig, musicians from local colleges including Berklee College of Music, and more recently Boston-based weblogs and podcasts such as Band in Boston Podcast.

== Visual arts ==
Museums dedicated to visual art in the Boston area include the Museum of Fine Arts, the National Center of Afro-American Artists, the Institute of Contemporary Art and the Isabella Stewart Gardner Museum. Notable art museums and galleries are associated with Harvard University, Boston University, the Massachusetts Institute of Technology, Boston College, Brandeis University, Tufts University, Wellesley College, MassArt, and other schools.

Numerous art galleries are located on Newbury Street, in the South End and in the Fort Point Channel area. Some of the most influential and longest running galleries in these areas include the Bernard Toale Gallery, Barbara Krakow Gallery, Howard Yezerski Gallery. The Boston Sculptors Gallery is one of only a handful of cooperative sculpture galleries in the country. The Boston Art Dealers Association sponsors artist talks, panels and awards ceremonies on a seasonal basis.

The Boston Cyberarts Gallery (formerly Axiom Center for New and Experimental Media) is one of several venues showing cutting-edge "high tech" and experimental artworks. The Boston Cyberarts Festival, a biennial area-wide celebration of the intersection of art and technology, ran from 1999 to 2011. The periodic Festival has been replaced by year-round programs, as described on their website.

In addition, the Boston Public Library (BPL) and the Boston Athenæum each have large collections of art, books, and research materials, and regularly host cultural events and exhibits. The BPL collects and exhibits drawings by living Boston artists, and the Athenæum hosts annual shows by member artists.

The Penny Arcade Expo, or PAX East convention is also held here every year in March. This event is known as one of the largest gatherings of gamers and exhibiting studios, next to other major events like the Game Developers Conference. Growing exponentially with each annual iteration, the expo is well known to many in the gaming industry, and continues to draw crowds every year to the Boston Convention Center.

== Events ==
Several major events occur annually in Boston. One of the best-known is the Boston Marathon, one of the oldest and most prestigious marathon races in the world. Taking place on the third Monday in April, the Marathon attracts professional runners from all over the world, and hundreds of thousands of Massachusetts residents gather to watch and cheer on the runners, who range from first-time participants to well-known athletes.

Boston was also the first major city to host the annual First Night festival, which occurs during New Year's Eve. It is a major arts and activity festival which attracts over 1.5 million people. Started in 1976, it has since been emulated in other cities worldwide. The Saint Patrick's Day Parade occurs in March and is popular with the city's large Irish population.

The Boston LGBT Pride parade and festival attracts approximately 400,000 participants each June. The Boston Globe Jazz and Blues Festival also takes place each June, and the Boston Early Music Festival takes place every odd-numbered year. During the summer, there are musical performances at the Leader Bank Pavilion on the South Boston waterfront. Also during the summer is Harborfest, a week-long festival celebrating American independence. Independence Day itself (the Fourth of July) is celebrated on the Charles River Esplanade; sunbathers and a flotilla of boats move in during the day, followed by fireworks after dark accompanied by classical and patriotic music performed by the Boston Pops.

The Boston Film Festival is held annually in early September. Also, on the weekend following Labor Day, the boutiques on Newbury Street close as over thirty art galleries spill out onto the street, providing access to their contents during Art Newbury Street.

Every year from June to September, celebrations honoring several Roman Catholic saints are held in the streets of Boston's North End. These celebrations, or feasts, include Italian foods, religious services, parades, festivities, games, and live music and entertainment. The largest celebration of the year is the Feast of Saint Anthony in August.

In October, the Boston Book Festival occurs in Copley Square. In past years, the event has attracted around 32,000 attendees. The event includes author keynotes, panels, live music, and family-friendly activities.

== Food ==
Cuisine in Boston is similar to the rest of New England cuisine, in that it has a large emphasis on seafood and dairy products. Its best-known dishes are New England clam chowder, fish and chips (usually with cod or scrod), Boston baked beans, lobsters, steamed clams, and fried clams.

Boston has many restaurants, including those serving various ethnic cuisines. Since the 1980s Boston has been undergoing an unexpected Renaissance in its culinary life, spearheaded by chefs of national stature such as Jasper White, Ming Tsai, and Todd English. Their respective restaurants, Summer Shack, Blue Ginger, and Olives have greatly enhanced foodie options in Boston. The influence of Julia Child, a long-time Cambridge resident and PBS TV star, lives on as well.

The Union Oyster House is the oldest operating restaurant in the United States. Their menu includes oysters on the half-shell served straight from an oyster bar, New England clam chowder, and other seafood dishes. Quincy Market, part of Faneuil Hall Marketplace, has a variety of restaurants and food shops. Nearby Cheers is a popular tourist dining spot.

Boston's Chinatown has a variety of Asian restaurants, bakeries, grocery stores, and medicinal herb and spice vendors. In addition to dim sum and other Chinese dining styles, there are Vietnamese, Japanese, Korean and Thai restaurants in the neighborhood.

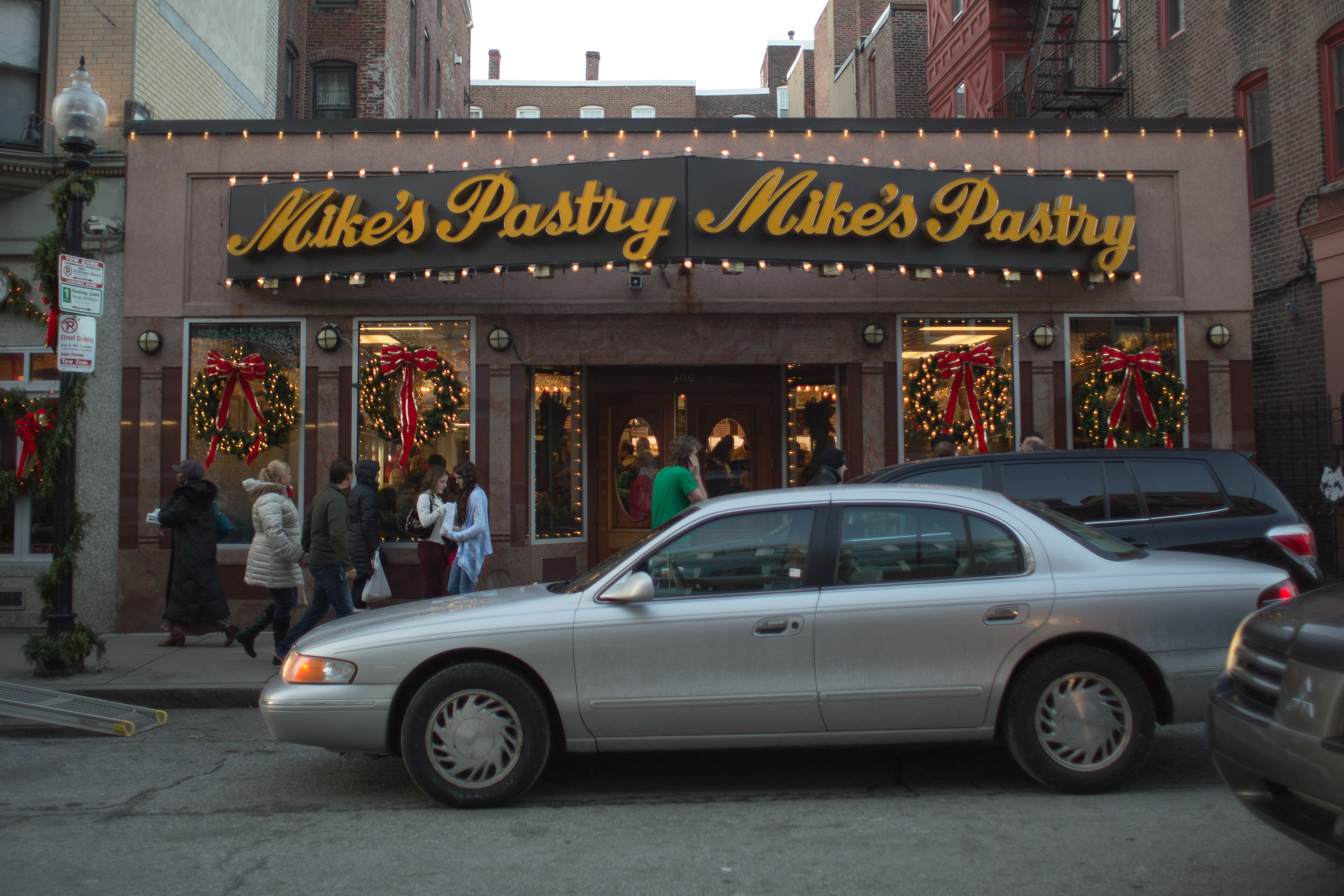
Mikes Pastry, Boston, Mass

The North End has a variety of Italian restaurants, pizzerias, and bakeries and is well known as Boston's "Little Italy." A favorite spot bringing in tourists is Mike's Pastry, located on Hanover Street and is extremely popular for its cannolis. Newbury Street has many ethnic street cafes, while Copley Place houses a multitude of restaurants, also the home of Legal Sea Foods, a New England institution that offers gourmet seafood dishes.

For decades, Boston has a hosted a two-day-a-week open-air market known as Haymarket. Haymarket vendors sell fresh fruit, vegetables, and fish. Meat, cheese, and other food can be purchased in adjacent permanent stores. In addition to so-called "winter farmers markets", other more seasonal farmer's markets are held in locations around Boston and its suburbs.

Boston's local food scene has been developed through the gathering and use of New England's resources and agriculture. Boston has over 27 open air farmers markets and a handful of active winter markets, find them at BostonFarmersMarkets.org. The Boston Local Food Festival also attracts a scene on average of 25,000 attendees and is an available resource to taste the local wares every September.

== Black culture ==
Black culture in Boston is very colorful. Blue Hill Avenue runs through Mattapan, Dorchester, and Roxbury. The three neighborhoods have a large community of African American people. The Avenue is home to many hair and nail salons, as well as Chinese, Caribbean, and soul food restaurants. There are numerous community centers, like the Mattahunt, in Mattapan. The Mattahunt is an elementary school with after-school and summer camp programs. There are numerous Boys and Girls clubs and YMCAs. The Roxbury Center for the Performing Arts is located in Dorchester. This school has been open since the late 1960s. It teaches jazz, ballet, hip hop, tap, African, and modern dance. Franklin Park Zoo is located on Blue Hill Avenue in Dorchester.

== Religion ==
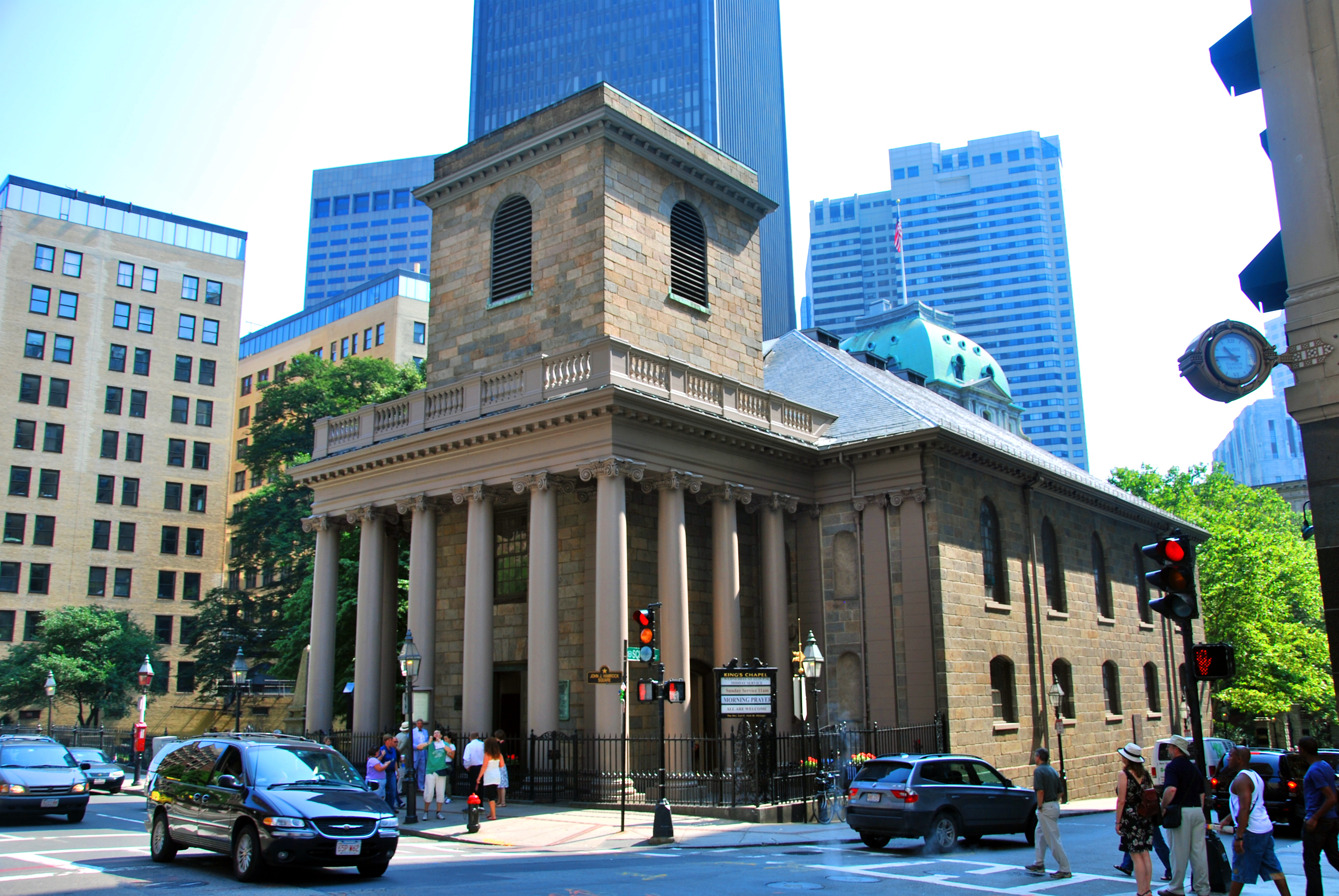
King's Chapel, the oldest church in Boston

Boston has been a noted religious center from its earliest days. The Roman Catholic Archdiocese of Boston serves nearly 300 parishes and is based in the Cathedral of the Holy Cross (1875) in the South End, while the Episcopal Diocese of Massachusetts, with the Cathedral Church of St. Paul (1819) as its episcopal seat, serves just under 200 congregations. Unitarian Universalism has its headquarters on Farnsworth Street, Boston. The Christian Scientists are headquartered in Back Bay at the Mother Church (1894). The oldest church in Boston is King's Chapel, the city's first Anglican church, founded in 1686 and converted to Unitarianism in 1785. Other notable churches include Christ Church (better known as Old North Church, 1723), the oldest church building in the city, Trinity Church (1733), Park Street Church (1809), First Church in Boston (congregation founded 1630, building raised 1868), Old South Church (1874), Jubilee Christian Church and Basilica and Shrine of Our Lady of Perpetual Help on Mission Hill (1878).

== LGBT community ==
Boston is home to many LGBT groups, such as the Bisexual Resource Center, Biversity, Boston Bisexual Women's Network, Gay, Lesbian and Straight Education Network of Boston, Human Rights Campaign Boston, and Lesbian Avengers of Boston. Boston has held an LGBT pride parade for 43 years, with the 43rd annual parade occurring in 2013. The Butterfly Music Transgender Chorus, the second transgender choir in the U.S., was founded in Boston in 2014. It inspired others to create similar groups in cities across the country.

== See also ==
- Boston Arts Festival
- Boston in fiction
- List of public art in Boston
- List of tourist attractions in Boston
- List of songs about Boston
- List of television shows set in Boston
- Media in Boston
- Sports in Boston
