= Sheila Cameron =

Sheila Cameron may refer to:

- Sheila Cameron (artist) (fl. 2005–2015), American artist
- Sheila Cameron (lawyer) (1934–2025), British lawyer and ecclesiastical judge
