= The Black Godfather (2019 film) =

2019 documentary film

- Directed by: Reginald Hudlin
- Produced by: Nicole Avant; Nelson George; Byron Phillips; Caitrin Rogers
- Starring: Hank Aaron; Dina R. Andrews; Clarence Avant
- Production companies: Boardwalk Pictures; Makemake
- Distributed by: Netflix
- Release date: June 7, 2019
- Running time: 118 minutes
- Country: United States
- Language: English

The Black Godfather is a 2019 American documentary film directed by Reginald Hudlin. The film depicts the story of music executive Clarence Avant, told by the people he worked with.

The film was released by Netflix on June 7, 2019.

== Premise ==
Clarence Avant, known as "the godfather of black music", is perhaps not well known by the general public, but very famous in the music industry. Starting as a manager to pianist-composer Lalo Schifrin, he later founded record labels, served as concert organizer, a special events producer, a fund-raiser for Democratic politicians, and a mentor to several African American executives.

== Cast ==
- Hank Aaron
- Dina R. Andrews
- Clarence Avant
- Nicole Avant
- Jim Brown
- Bill Clinton
- Barack Obama
- Kenneth Edmonds
- Kamala Harris
- Jesse Jackson
- Jimmy Jam
- Quincy Jones
- Terry Lewis
- Benny Medina
- L.A. Reid
- Lionel Richie
- Ted Sarandos
- Al Sharpton
- Bill Withers
- Jamie Foxx
- Berry Gordy
- David Geffen
- Snoop Dogg
- Clive Davis

== Release and reception ==
The documentary was released on June 7, 2019, on Netflix streaming. On review aggregator Rotten Tomatoes, the film holds an approval rating of 100% based on six reviews. Metacritic, which uses a weighted average, assigned the film a score of 69 out of 100, based on 5 critics, indicating "generally favorable" reviews.
