= Murray Dewart =

American sculptor

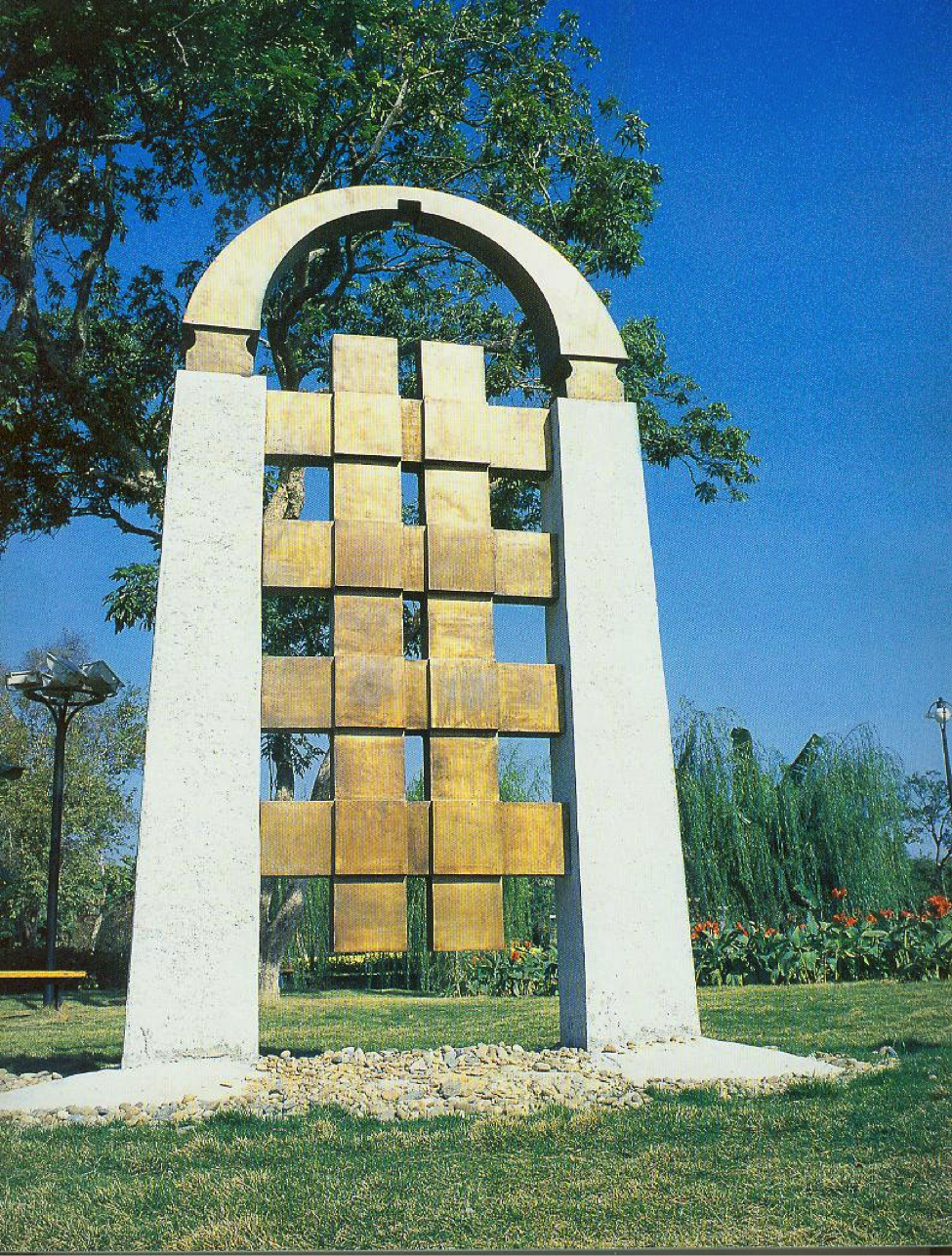
Earth House Hold, 12 feet high, bronze and granite, Fuzhou International Sculpture Park, Fuzhou, China

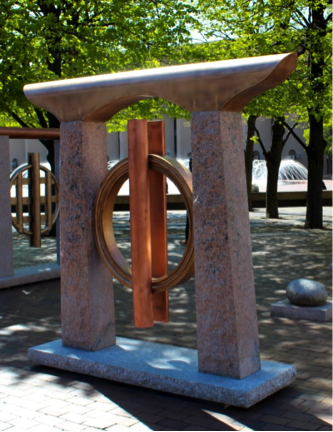
One Bright Morning, 7 feet high, bronze, copper and granite, Convergence Exhibit, Christian Science Plaza, Boston

Murray Dewart (born September 19, 1947) is an American sculptor best known for his large gate-like structures in granite and bronze. Dewart's sculptures are often created for site-specific locations and installed in parks and gardens. His work is in more than thirty museums and public collections around the world. He is the editor of the Random House anthology Poems About Sculpture.

== Early life and education ==
Dewart was born in St. Johnsbury, Vermont, in 1947. His father, grandfather and great-grandfather were Protestant clergymen. Raised in Boston, Dewart attended the Dexter School, Milton Academy and Harvard College, where he studied sculpture with William Reimann. After graduating with honors in 1970, Dewart lived in rural Vermont and New Hampshire for seven years before returning to Boston. The solitude of the country sparked his interest in building a community of sculptors, which evolved into the Boston Sculptors Gallery. Founded in 1992, it is one of the only sculptors' cooperatives in the country with its own exhibition space. Dewart earned an MFA from the Massachusetts College of Art in 1992.

== Career ==
Between 1993 and 2015, Dewart mounted 11 solo shows at venues including the Boston Sculptors Gallery, Saint Paul's School in Concord, New Hampshire, and the Chapel Gallery in Newton, Massachusetts. His work has been included in more than 200 group exhibitions in the United States, China, France and Peru. He has completed large-scale public commissions in China and Israel, as well as in cities throughout the United States. Dewart's work is held in more than 30 public collections both nationally and internationally.

Art critic Marty Carlock hailed Dewart as "one of Boston's premier sculptors", noting that "the sculptures project scale and confidence (...) muscular, stalwart, forceful, they exude serenity, like Asian 'torii' gates." Critic Christine Temin pointed to "the sheer beauty and craftsmanship of his work" and "sculptures that have something to say ... with the bright force of late Matisse." Paul Master-Karnik, former director of the deCordova Museum and Sculpture Park, remarked, "Suggesting a road less-traveled that does not lead to anything but itself, Dewart's construction reveals a space to contemplate both the view before us and the view behind us. Coming and going along the same route thus becomes a metaphorical passage through the space of one's own life and time."

In 2013, Dewart led the organization of a large group exhibition of sculpture on the Christian Science Plaza in Boston. Sebastian Smee, art critic for The Boston Globe, wrote, "I was impressed by Murray Dewart, whose 'One Bright Morning' reprises this sculptor's signature granite and bronze gate-like forms. Arranged in a sculptural corroboree that faces both inward and out, these steadfast, symbol-laden works seek to offer a kind of spiritual shelter from the storm of contemporary ephemerality."

Dewart taught in the Brookline, Massachusetts, public schools from 1979 to 2010 and served on the fine arts faculty of St. Anselm College in Goffstown, New Hampshire, from 1996 to 2005.

In 2016, Dewart edited Poems About Sculpture, published by Penguin Books, an anthology in the Random House Everyman's Library, with a preface by Robert Pinsky.

He is the subject of Murray Dewart, a documentary video by Grace Colby.

== Collections ==
Selected international collections featuring Dewart's work include the Beijing International Sculpture Park, Fuzhou International Sculpture Park and the Cheng Yunxian Collection, Nanchang, all in China; the Museum of San Marcos University, Lima, Peru; and Pechersky Ascension Monastery, in Pskovo, Russia. Selected stateside collections include the Museum of Fine Arts, Boston Public Library, and Fidelity Corporate Collection, all in Boston, Massachusetts; Fogg Art Museum, Harvard University, in Cambridge, Massachusetts; DeCordova Museum and Sculpture Park, Lincoln, Massachusetts; Rose Art Museum, Brandeis University, Waltham, Massachusetts; Danforth Museum, Framingham, Massachusetts; Smith College chapel, Northampton, Massachusetts; and Rutgers University, New Brunswick, New Jersey.

== Awards ==
In 2004, Dewart received an award for excellence in design from the Boston Society of Architects, and he won editor's choice in Landscape Architecture magazine in July of the same year. In 2006, he received a Nomination Award at Beijing Olympic Park.

== Personal life ==
Dewart is married to Mary Davis Dewart, a landscape designer. They have lived in Brookline, Massachusetts, since 1978, where they raised their sons, Caleb and Nathaniel.
