= First Friday (public event) =

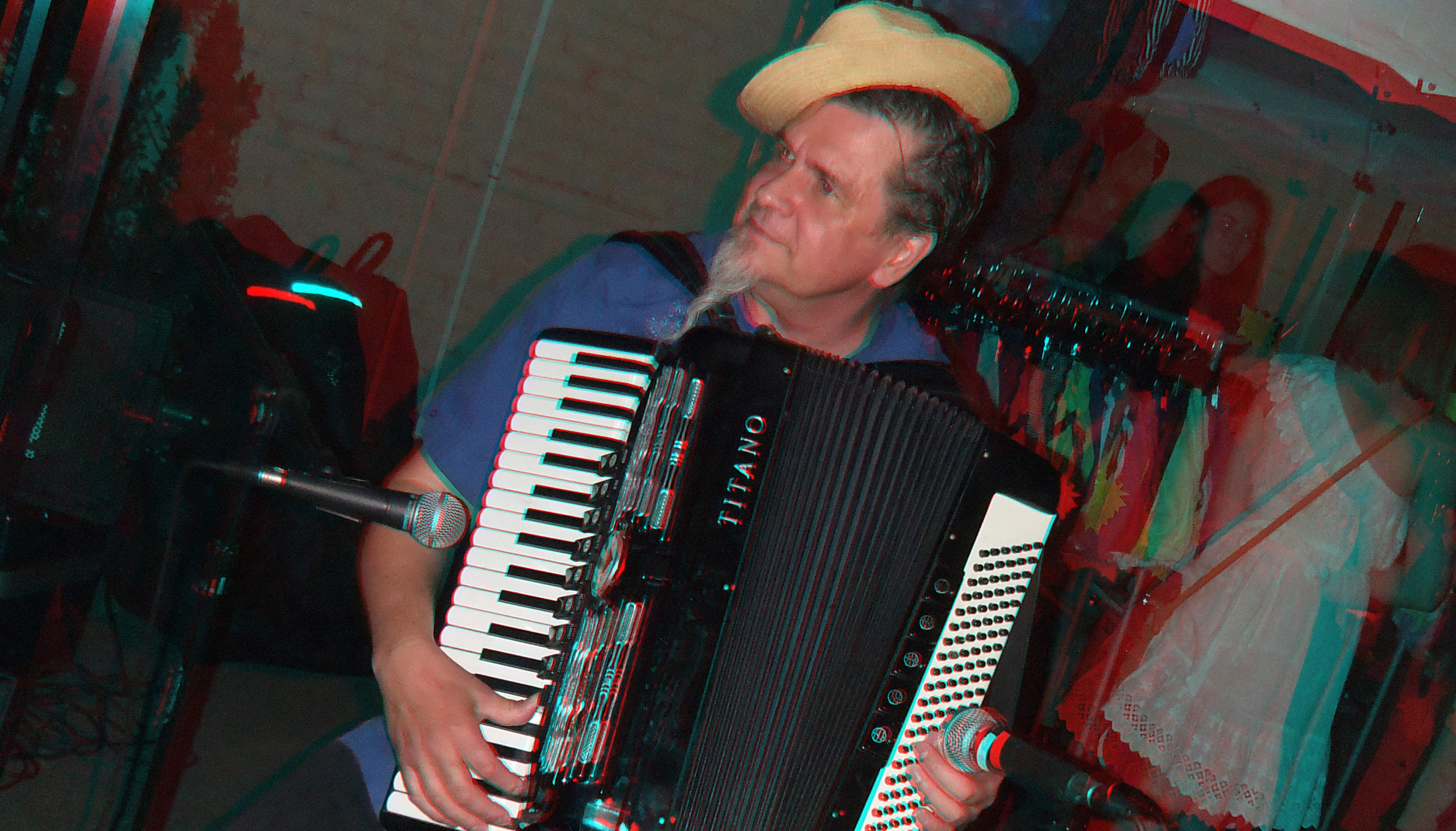
First Fridays at the Commonwealth Club in Richmond, Virginia, United States (2011)

"First Friday" is a name for various public events in some cities (particularly in the United States) that occur on the first Friday of every month.

These citywide events may take on many purposes, including art gallery openings, and social and political networking. American cities have promoted such events to bring people to historic areas perceived as dangerous, using the "safety in numbers" mentality to combat urban decay. In some cities this monthly event may occur on the first Saturday of each month instead of Friday or on "Third Thursdays".

Additionally, these are "see and be seen" events that serve as a block party or social gathering open to the general public. Some of these events may be centered on political networking by Republicans and Democrats, but usually First Fridays are art and entertainment destinations. They may involve pub crawling, other retail establishments such as cafes and restaurants, and performances by fire twirling acts, jazz musicians, belly dancing, street musicians, or others.

"First Fridays" is also a nationally recognized networking event targeting Black professionals held on the first Friday of every month in various cities throughout North America. These events started in 1987 and provide urban professionals an opportunity to socially network, exchange and share ideas on professional, educational, political and social issues.

== Art gallery openings ==
Some cities hold "gallery hops" and "art walks", in which a number of the town's art galleries, museums, or artists' studios, both commercial and non-profit 501c3 organizations, will open their doors on Friday evening. The idea is that galleries will attract people to the downtown and enrich the art community by pooling their openings together, sometimes, as in the case of art6 and Artspace in Richmond, Virginia (when in Jackson Ward at 6 East Broad Street) into one monthly evening in a historically designated arts district .

Among the cities with art-oriented First Friday events are: Albany, Anchorage, Augusta, Bellingham, Binghamton, Boston, Burlington, Chicago, Columbia (Missouri), Columbus, Denver, Fort Collins, Honolulu, Hood River, Indianapolis, Ithaca, Juneau, Kalamazoo, Kansas City, Knoxville, Lincoln, Louisville, Las Vegas, Lubbock, Miami, Missoula, Peoria (Illinois), Scranton, Oakland, Oklahoma City, Oklahoma, Olympia, Philadelphia, Phoenix, Pittsburgh, Portland (Maine), Raleigh, Richmond, Rochester, San Antonio, San Jose, Santa Cruz, Santa Rosa, Spokane, Tallahassee, Tulsa, York (PA), Marietta, Ohio, and Ypsilanti.

Richmond, Virginia is among the largest First Fridays art walks in the nation. It draws nearly 20,000 people from all over the state of Virginia and nation, showcasing its artistic side and opening restaurants and art galleries all over Broad Street, Manchester area, and Downtown Richmond. Artspace and Art6 Gallery were two of the first anchor galleries for First Fridays on Broad Street in Richmond.

One of the oldest First Friday's is located in Boston's SoWa Arts District where more than 80 artists open their studios to the public every First Friday. The SoWa Arts District is located at Harrison Ave and Thayer Street in Boston's South End. In 2015, USA Today's 10BEST readers poll voted the SoWa as the second best arts district in the country.

== Social networking ==
Some First Fridays promote arts and culture combined with social networking, like First Fridays in Tucson, AZ. Other smaller-scale First Fridays serve as social gatherings for groups of friends or people new to an area and may involve no art.

They may also include the large First Friday events such as those in Phoenix, Arizona, attracting up to 20,000 attendees to hundreds of spaces.

Various cities areas have First Fridays centered on politically conservative networking. The pioneer of these events began in Washington, D.C., but similar events have found success in Virginia, Nevada, and Arizona.

In many cities, First Fridays events place an emphasis on African American networking and business opportunities for African American professionals. First Friday is the top networking event for African American professionals and consistently attracts over 16,000 people each month across North America according to First Fridays United.

The First Fridays monthly events originated in 1987 as an outlet for African American professionals to mix, mingle and network. During the 1980s it was common for an individual to be the only black professional working in their company. First Fridays happy hours become a way for these professionals to meet in a social atmosphere while exchanging useful information. The concept spread rapidly and First Fridays chapters now operate in 39 cities across North America and seven countries worldwide, including Austin, Binghamton, Birmingham, Boston, Charlotte, Charleston, Chicago, Cincinnati, Cleveland, Detroit, Fort Myers, Fort Lauderdale, Hattiesburg, Hartford, Hong Kong, Houston, Indianapolis, Jackson, Kansas City, Kingston, Las Vegas, Los Angeles, Long Beach London, Louisville, Memphis, Miami, Nashville, Nassau, New Orleans, New York, Newark, Oakland, Orlando, Philadelphia, Phoenix, Pittsburgh, Raleigh, Richmond, Rio de Janeiro, Sacramento, San Antonio, San Diego, San Francisco, St. Louis, Normandy, Scranton, South Bend, Syracuse, Tallahassee, Tokyo, Toronto, Washington, D.C., and since May 2016 also in Switzerland Biel/Bienne

In 2002, several First Fridays operators created First Fridays United, which is a company founded to organize the existing First Fridays chapters in 30 cities into one group to share information, resources and solicit corporate sponsors and advertisers. The organization sponsors a series of international events in addition to the monthly networking happy hours. Today, First Fridays reaches over 450,000 urban professionals through email, internet, and event marketing and has had numerous Fortune 1000 corporate clients. Chanin Walsh was one of the first to create a marketing plan for First Friday in Doylestown which turned the “art gallery model” into an all-merchant benefiting event.

== Controversies ==
First Friday events focusing on the arts have often come under attack for specific components of the events that are politically popular such as drag shows, explicit art, among others. One prominent example of this sort of controversy occurred in Lubbock, Texas in fall 2024. At the July event, there was a drag performance sponsored by CASP that attracted political attention from the local city council. In response, the city council revoked some public funding from the event.

== Las Vegas shooting incident (2026) ==
At a Las Vegas First Friday, on October 2nd, 2026, a fight broke out among youths during which a 15-year-old boy was fatally shot. Two others were also injured. A 17-year-old will be tried as an adult for the murder and two attempted murders.
