= Sheila Cameron (artist) =

American film producer

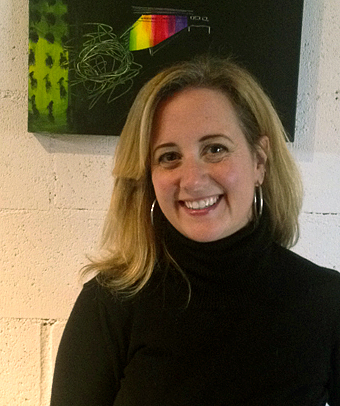
- Cameron at The Center for The Arts
- Education: Loyola University Maryland
- Occupations: blogger; graphic designer; painter; producer
- Known for: "Free Katie"
- Movement: DANK (Do Art Now Kids)
- Website: Sheila Cameron

Sheila Cameron is an American artist, blogger, graphic designer and producer based in California. She is mostly known for initiating the "Free Katie" campaign, in which she designed and sold merchandise in response to the news of Katie Holmes's engagement to Tom Cruise.

== Hollywood ==
After graduating from Maryland's Loyola University, having double-majored in creative writing and fine art, Ohio native Cameron moved to Hollywood, to focus on painting and writing. While living there, she worked as a graphic designer, and also a producer and developer of content for film, television and websites, with clients and employers including HBO's original pictures department, Jagged Films, and Project Greenlight.

=== Free Katie ===
In response to the news of Katie Holmes's engagement to Tom Cruise in 2005, Cameron designed and began selling merchandise online bearing slogans including "Free Katie", "Run Katie Run", and (in a reference to Cruise's Oprah interview) "Stop Sofa Abuse", among other designs. Items for sale included buttons, hats, mugs, stickers, T-shirts and undergarments. Imitators soon copied Cameron's designs and began selling Free Katie merchandise as well.

In less than a month, the Free Katie website received more than half a million visitors, and sold thousands of shirts and other merchandise to customers both in the US and around the world. Free Katie shirts were worn on the red carpet in 2005 and made reference to by Iggy Pop in a 2006 interview, and in 2008 a group of fans picketed Katie Holmes's Broadway debut, their signs bearing Cameron's "Free Katie" and "Run Katie Run" slogans. As late as 2012, a group of people wearing Free Katie shirts had an unexpected encounter with Holmes herself when they all dined at the same restaurant. Shortly thereafter, the then-recently divorced Holmes was seen wearing a Free Katie shirt of her own.

Free Katie's popularity also led to the creation of an online forum community, which is still active as of 2015. Cameron was deluged with emails from fans, and she had to buy more bandwidth multiple times to accommodate the traffic the Free Katie website and forums generated.

Cameron's Free Katie campaign was covered by U.S. media including ABC News, Los Angeles Times, NBC News, Newsweek, and The New York Times; she was interviewed by NPR and a British TV program; and the phenomenon was covered internationally by news outlets in Australia, Brazil, India, Spain and Sweden, among others.

Cameron clarified that she did not actually believe Holmes to be in need of rescue from her relationship with Cruise, but added, "I think we need to let her know that we support her if she wants to get out of it." She also said she originally created the Free Katie campaign for the amusement of herself and some friends, but that interest in the merchandise snowballed. The success of Free Katie merchandise motivated Cameron to produce T-shirts featuring other "pop-culture satire political commentary" as well.

Cameron called the Free Katie campaign her "Dear John letter to Hollywood," citing the intra-industry response to criticism of mega-stars like Tom Cruise by people at her echelon of the Hollywood ladder. She left Hollywood not long after the campaign achieved widespread notoriety.

== Works and exhibitions ==
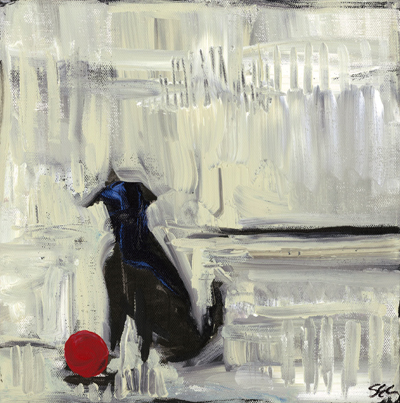
Cameron's canine portrait Sit was her first painting to be featured on a magazine cover

Cameron is part of two artist collectives: Nevada County Yarn Bombers, which focuses on textile art, especially knitted and crocheted works; and DANK (Do Art Now Kids), whose "pop-up gallery" initiative, to bring art into otherwise unused spaces, she helped pioneer.

=== Blog ===
Cameron maintains a noted blog, Watching the Paint Dry, that contains essays about creativity, family life and other topics, and which also serves as a storefront for her artwork. She has characterized her blogging as a way to "illustrate what it means to be an artist." Cameron began the blog in June 2010, immediately embarking on a project of posting art on a daily basis for a full year.

=== Magazine covers ===
The August 2012 issue of Style magazine's Roseville Granite Bay Rocklin edition featured Cameron's painting "Sit" as its cover image, and included a profile of her inside the magazine.

=== Jerry Saltz's challenge ===
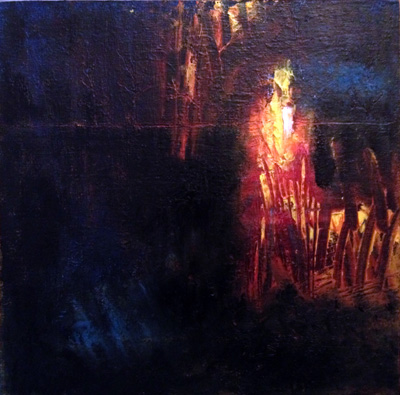
Hell 14 is one of the pieces painted in response to Saltz's direct challenge

In 2013, Jerry Saltz, senior art critic for New York magazine, issued a challenge to Cameron via Facebook:

"Sheila Cameron, All right. You asked for it.

Make 55 works with NO allusion to Fairytale.
And experiment with various mediums and finishes and touches and surfaces and ideas-of-finish.
Start today; you'll be in hell by the end of this VERY simple challenge...
Maybe remove figures for these works as well.
Or just get to work.

See you in Hell … … … maybe."

In response, Cameron created the requisite 55 works, a three-month project she described approaching as a performance piece. The resulting collection was exhibited as a Facebook event, and some pieces were auctioned via eBay. Saltz himself, in reviewing the collection, said, "Sheila Cameron did magnificently."

=== ArtSlant competition ===
ArtSlant magazine named Cameron's submission, "Original Super Power", a finalist in its 2013 juried competition.

=== Exhibitions ===
- Beautiful Monsters. At Miner's Foundry Cultural Center. Solo exhibition. 2011
- At Art Works Gallery. Juried shows. 2012–2013

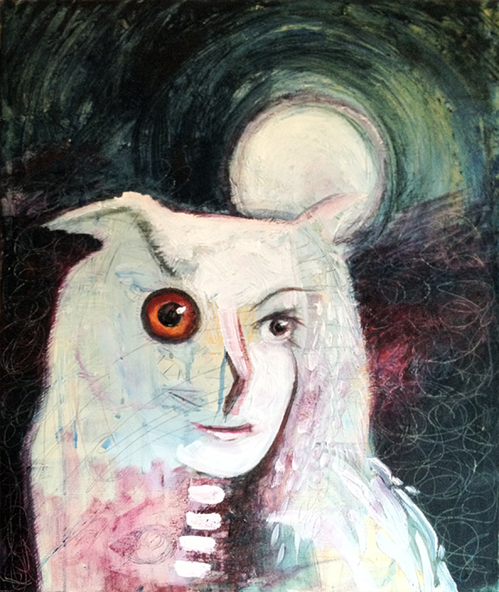
The Evolution of the Feather

- Wild & Scenic Film Festival Art Exhibition. At multiple venues. A juried exhibition, for which Cameron was one of 40 artists chosen from among 500 applicants. 2013
- Smallworks. At Artist Studio in the Foothills. Group show of works measuring 12 inches or less. 2013
- Two Johns and a Whore. At Los Angeles's Coagula Curatorial. A curated show with a theme of "art, love, sex, and commerce" and how they interrelate. 2014
- Art Walk program. At multiple venues including "pop-up" galleries. A project of the Nevada City-based art collective DANK. 2014– 2015
- Wild & Scenic Film Festival Art Exhibition. Osborne Woods Gallery. Juried exhibition. 2015
- Discover. At Off Center Stage, part of Grass Valley's Center for the Arts. Solo show, but part of a multidisciplinary exhibition matching visual art with live music, readings and other creative works. 2014
- ArtExpo. At a former factory space in San Diego. Curated exhibition presented as an alternative to the concurrently-running San Diego Comic-Con. 2014
- Every Angeleno Counts. At outdoor display along route. Curated exhibition combined with a 5K (5 km (3.1 mi)) run/walk. 2014
- LORE: The Art of Story. At Miner's Foundry Cultural Center. DANK group show. 2015
- New Works. At Miner's Foundry Cultural Center. DANK group show. 2015
- Cinema. At Miner's Foundry Cultural Center. DANK group show. 2015

== Personal life ==
Cameron and her husband Greg have two daughters. In 2008, Cameron and her family relocated from West Hollywood to the Grass Valley, California area, settling in Nevada City.
