= Boston Sculptors Gallery =

Coordinates: 42.3424°N 71.066°W

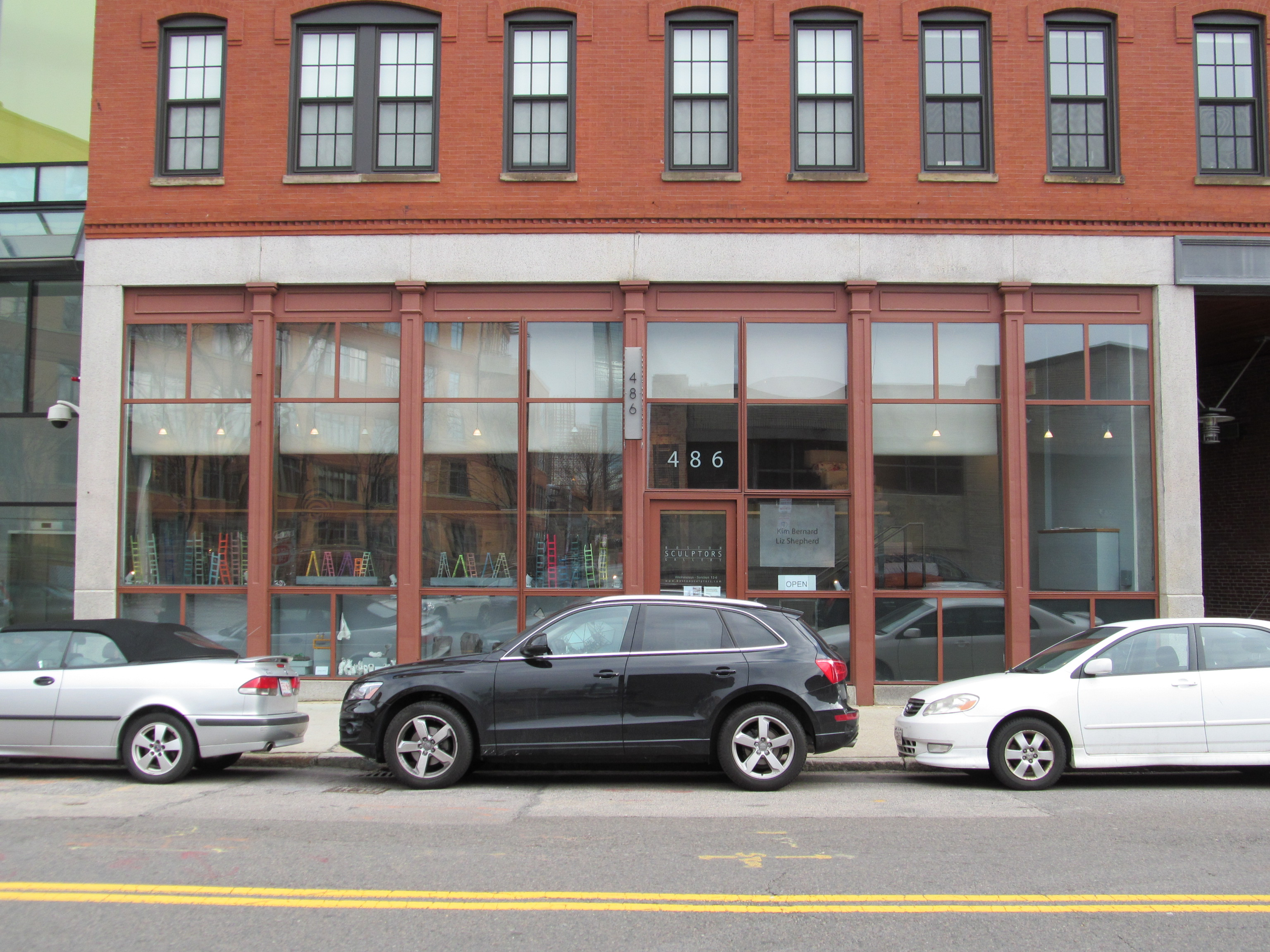
Boston Sculptors Gallery

The Boston Sculptors Gallery is a cooperative sculpture gallery in Boston, Massachusetts. Unlike a traditional commercial gallery, Boston Sculptors Gallery is owned and operated by local, New England artists and exhibits contemporary sculpture in a range of mediums. There are currently over 35 exhibiting sculptors in the group. Each month, two of these artists hold concurrent solo shows in the gallery. A chapter member of the International Sculpture Center, Almitra Stanley currently directs Boston Sculptors Gallery.

== History ==
Founded in 1992, The Boston Sculptors Gallery is the creation of two local Boston artists Joyce McDaniel and Murray Dewart, who in 1992 joined 17 other artists to form a cooperative exhibition space.

Originally opened in a converted Sunday School, the gallery relocated in 2004 to 486 Harrison Avenue in the SOWA (South of Washington) arts district of Boston. It was one of the first galleries to open in the newly converted art space.

Over time, membership has increased as the cooperative has expanded to 37 active members as of 2020.

== Exhibitions ==
Exhibitions at the Boston Sculptors Gallery generally last four weeks and feature one or two individual members artists' work. The gallery program has garnered critical attention from numerous publications, including The Boston Globe and Artforum. In 2018, the Boston Sculptors Gallery was awarded as one of the 25 Best American Galleries and Museums by the American Art Awards.
