= Dina Andrews =

American music executive

Dina Ruth Andrews (born February 28) is an American music executive, and entrepreneur. She is President and General Manager of Dina Andrews Management.

== Biography ==
Andrews is a native of Los Angeles. She graduated from Azusa Pacific University where she acquired her BS in Business with an emphasis in Organizational Leadership. Andrews began her music career at the age of 19 under the tutelage of Dick Griffey the CEO of Solar Records.

== Career ==
After four years at Solar Records, Andrews was pursued by producers Jimmy Jam and Terry Lewis to help them with their careers as songwriter/producers. In 1982, Andrews began managing the careers of the duo who were then with "The Time" a Minneapolis musical group signed to Prince's Paisley Park Records (a Warner's Bros Joint Venture). Andrews introduced the duo's music to Tabu Records Founder/CEO Clarence Avant who gave Andrews an opportunity to do a deal with him for Jam and Lewis to produce SOS Band. Thus, the start of Flyte Tyme Productions. Andrews negotiated deals for Jam and Lewis to write and produce for SOS Band, Cheryl Lynn (Encore), Change (Change of Heart), Cherrelle, and Alexander O'Neil. She entered negotiations with Warner Chappell Music for a multimillion-dollar co-publishing deal, and with Clive Davis and Gerry Griffeth at Arista Records in the early 1980s. Andrews contracted with Perry Williams Entertainment, Production Company to Leon Sylvers, Keith Washington, Robert Daniels, Troy Johnson, and Luscious Daim. She was later approached by Motown Productions Burl Hecthman, to join Motown Productions to work in television. She began her career Hechtman's temporary Executive Assistant before being promoted to West Coast Project Manager.

Andrews signed guy group "Fresh Attraction" to her production company. Having done several deals with Capitol Records through then VP of A & R Scott Folks, Andrews entered into a development deal for Artist Development and Production for "Fresh Attraction". Upon expiration of the Development Deal with Capitol Records, Andrews was approached by entertainment attorney Ron Sweeney (her former attorney) who had become President of Tabu Records. Sweeney offered her a production deal to record under the Tabu umbrella.

In 1992, Andrews accepted the role as General Manager for Pebbles PT Entertainment which managed the group TLC. At the time, Andrews was U.S. manager of songwriter/producer Derek Bramble.

In 1994, Andrews began representing Gospel and Christian songwriter/producers and recording artists, "Virtue" on Verity Records. Percy Bady, songwriter/producer on Full Gospel Fellowship Choir "Bow Down and Worship" (Gospo-Centric); Marvin Sapp (Word Records); Trin-i-tee 5:7 (Gospo-Cenric); Rev. Milton Brunson & The Thompson Comm. Singers (Word Records); Gary Oliver (Sony Music Group); Kelli Williams (Word Records) "It's Gonna Be Alright" and "I Get Lifted"; Angelo & Veronica (Benson Music Group) "Not Enough"; Benson Christmas (Benson Music Group); Hezekiah Walker (Benson Music Group); GMWA (Benson Music Group); DeLeon Richards (Intersound Records); Nu City Mass Choir (New Haven Records) 1998 recording; Virtue (Verity/Zomba) Verity Christmas project.

In 2000, Andrews was introduced to Bishop Gilbert Thompson and his family. Andrews was hired as a Music Consultant to build their record label Axiom Entertainment. Andrews worked for New Covenant (now Jubilee) in Boston, Massachusetts, as their Consultant & Acting President for three years until she founded Knew Beginnings Entertainment.

== Black history ==
Andrews is among one the first black female American music industry executives to represent songwriter/producers. She was nominated as an African-American History Maker in Entertainment by The History Makers in February 2006.

== Sources ==
- The Music Powers that Be--: To Succeed in the Music Industry
- Jimmy Jam and Terry Lewis
- Radio Swiss Jazz - Music database - Musician
