= 177 Huntington =

Skyscraper in Boston, Massachusetts

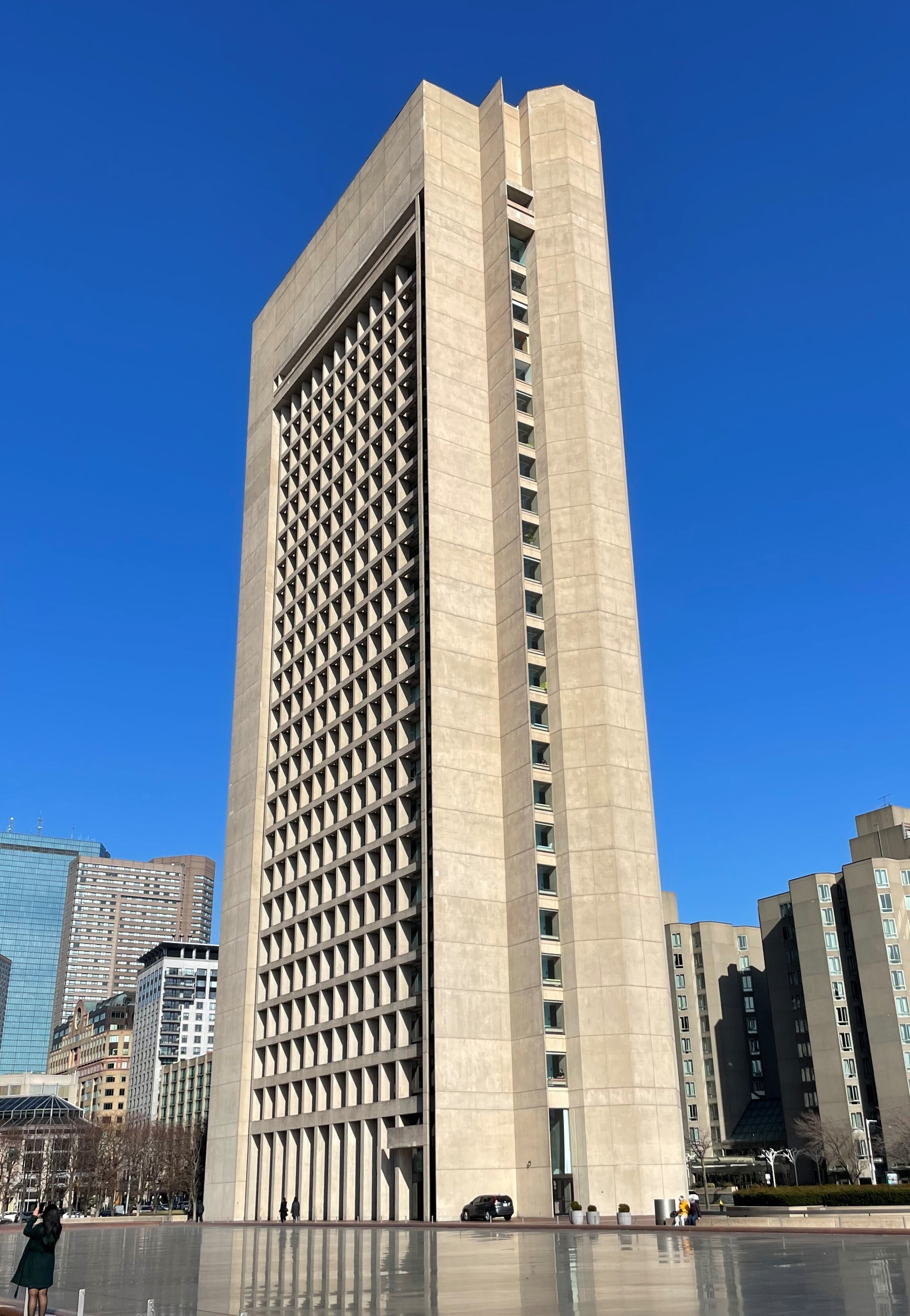
- The skyscraper in 2023
- Interactive map of the 177 Huntington area

General information
- Status: Completed
- Type: Office
- Architectural style: Brutalist
- Location: 177 Huntington Avenue, Boston, Massachusetts, U.S.
- Coordinates: 42.344878°N 71.082831°W
- Construction started: 1968
- Completed: 1972
- Opening: 1973
- Owner: Beacon Capital Partners

Height
- Roof: 367 ft (112 m)

Technical details
- Floor count: 28
- Floor area: 275,000 sq ft (25,500 m^{2})

Design and construction
- Architects: Araldo Cossutta, Pei Cobb Freed & Partners
- Structural engineer: Weiskopf & Pickworth, New York, NY

177 Huntington (formerly the Christian Science Administration Building) is an iconic 367-foot-tall (112 m) Brutalist skyscraper located in the Christian Science Center in the Fenway neighborhood of Boston, Massachusetts. It is situated on the Christian Science Plaza, which is a Boston landmark.

== History ==
The original design of the building came from I.M. Pei & Partners and Araldo Cossutta Associated Architects in the 1970s, when the Christian Science Plaza was being constructed. The building was completed in 1972 and it opened in 1973, originally served as the Christian Science world headquarters.

In 2012, it was leased by Beacon Capital Partners and underwent renovations soon afterward. Current tenants include Northeastern University, as well as consulting and investment companies. In 2017, four peregrine falcons hatched in one of the building ledges.

== Accolades ==
In 2017, the building won The Office Building of the Year award in the renovated building category from the mid-Atlantic division of the Building Owners and Managers Association.

In 2018, the building is ranked No. 4 in the top 100 best buildings in Boston by the Boston Magazine, behind the John Hancock Tower, the John F. Kennedy Federal Building, and the Boston City Hall.

== Gallery ==
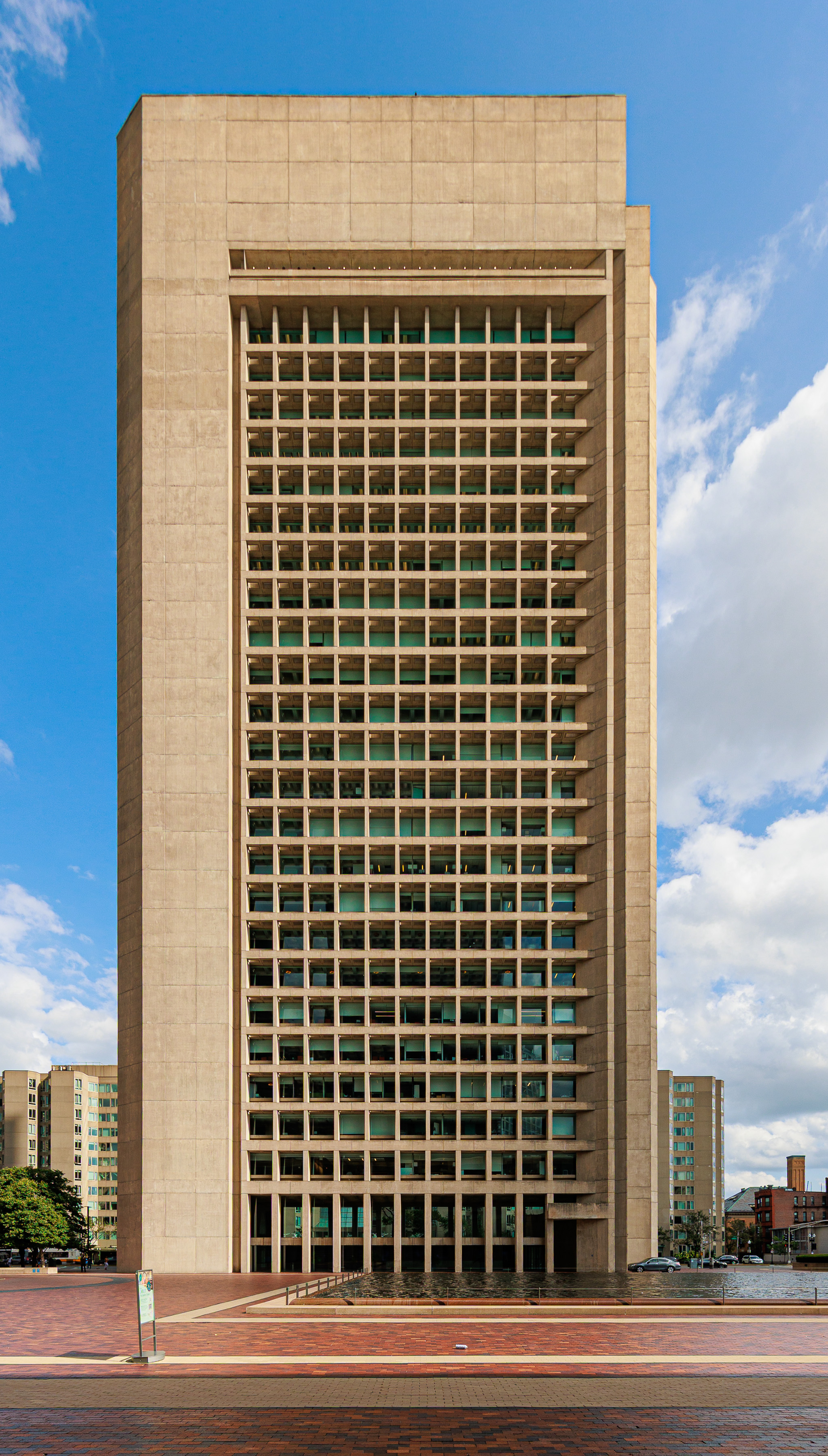
Facade of the skyscraper

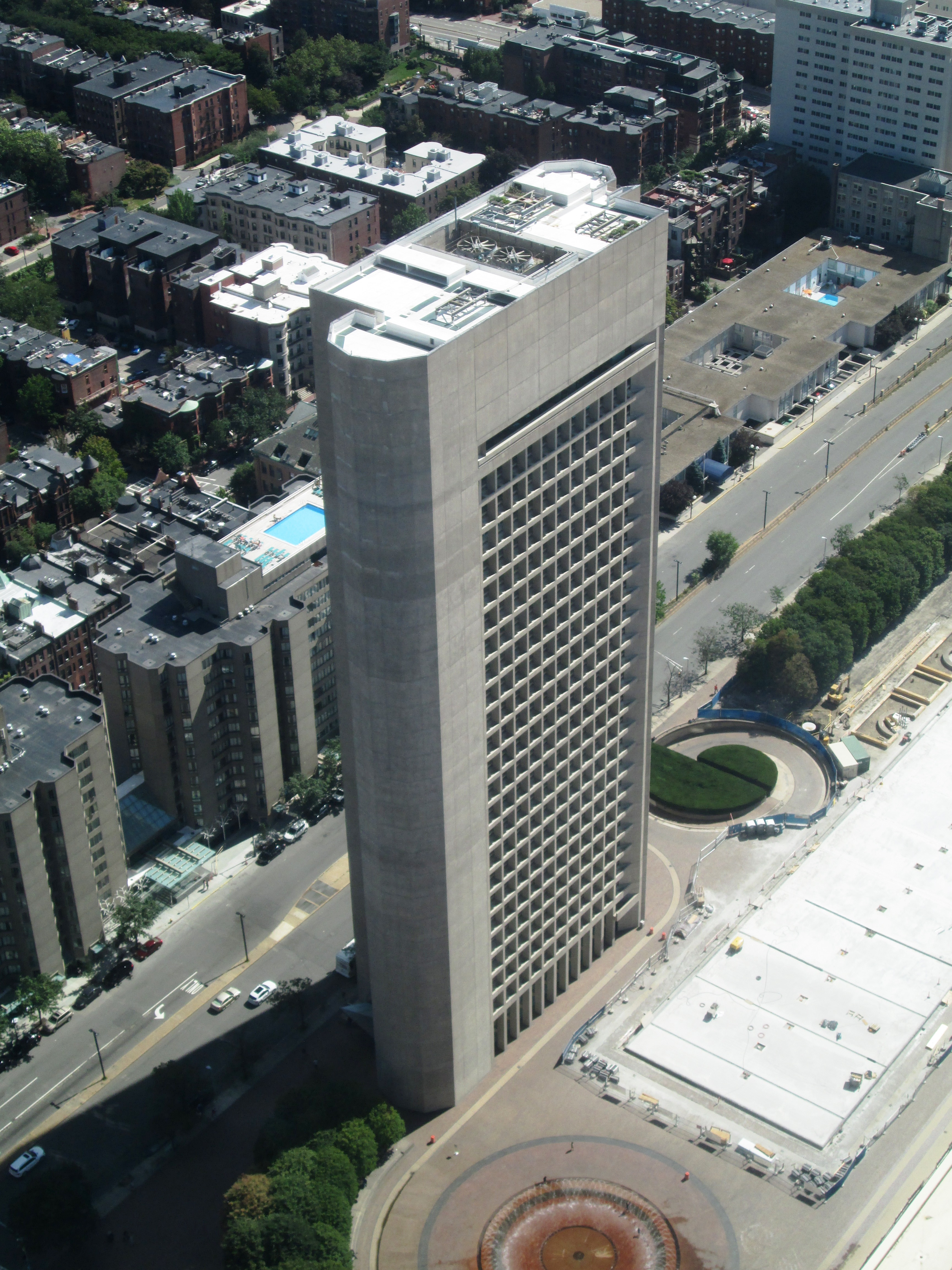
Aerial view of the skyscraper

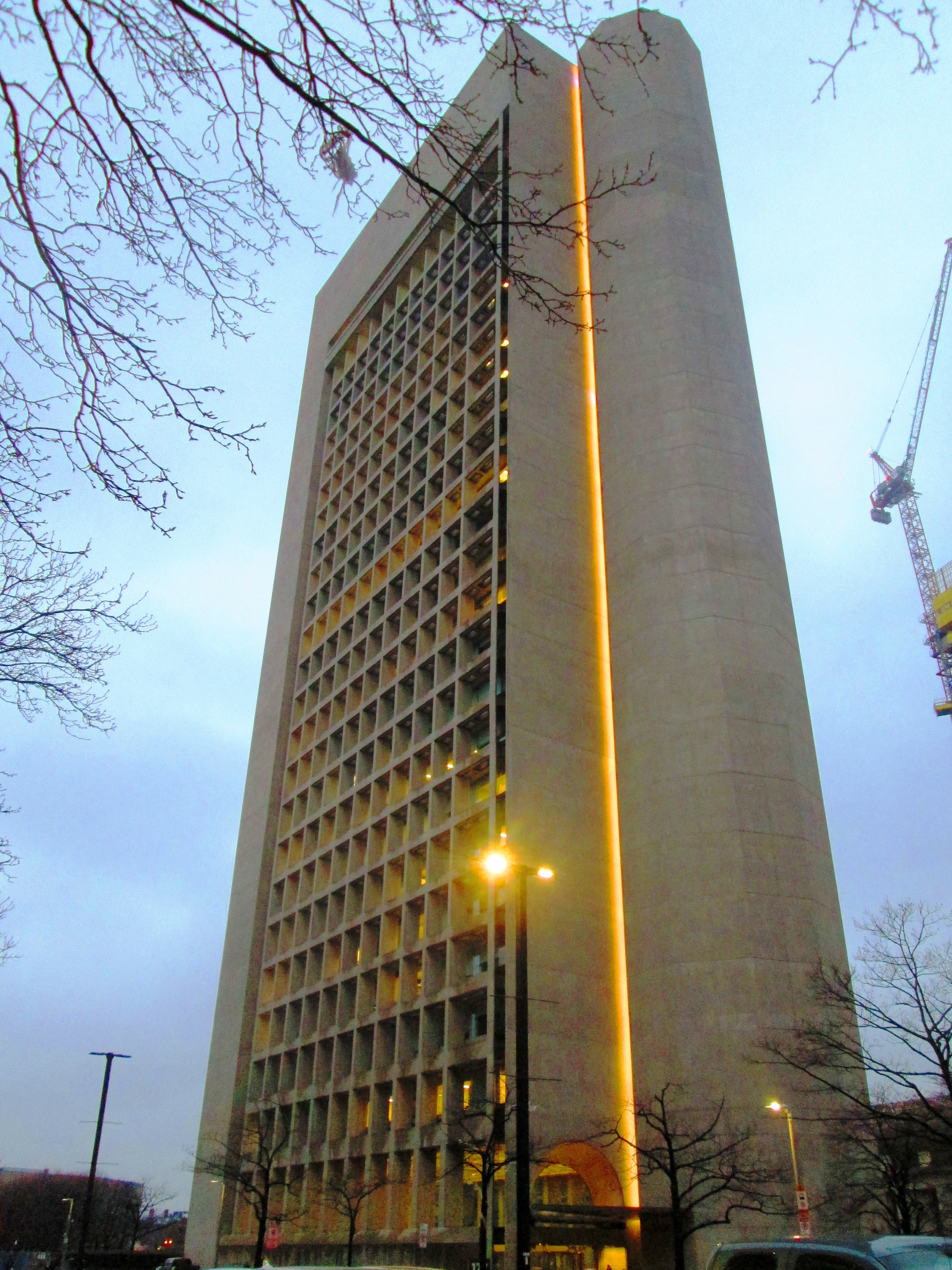
The skyscraper at dusk

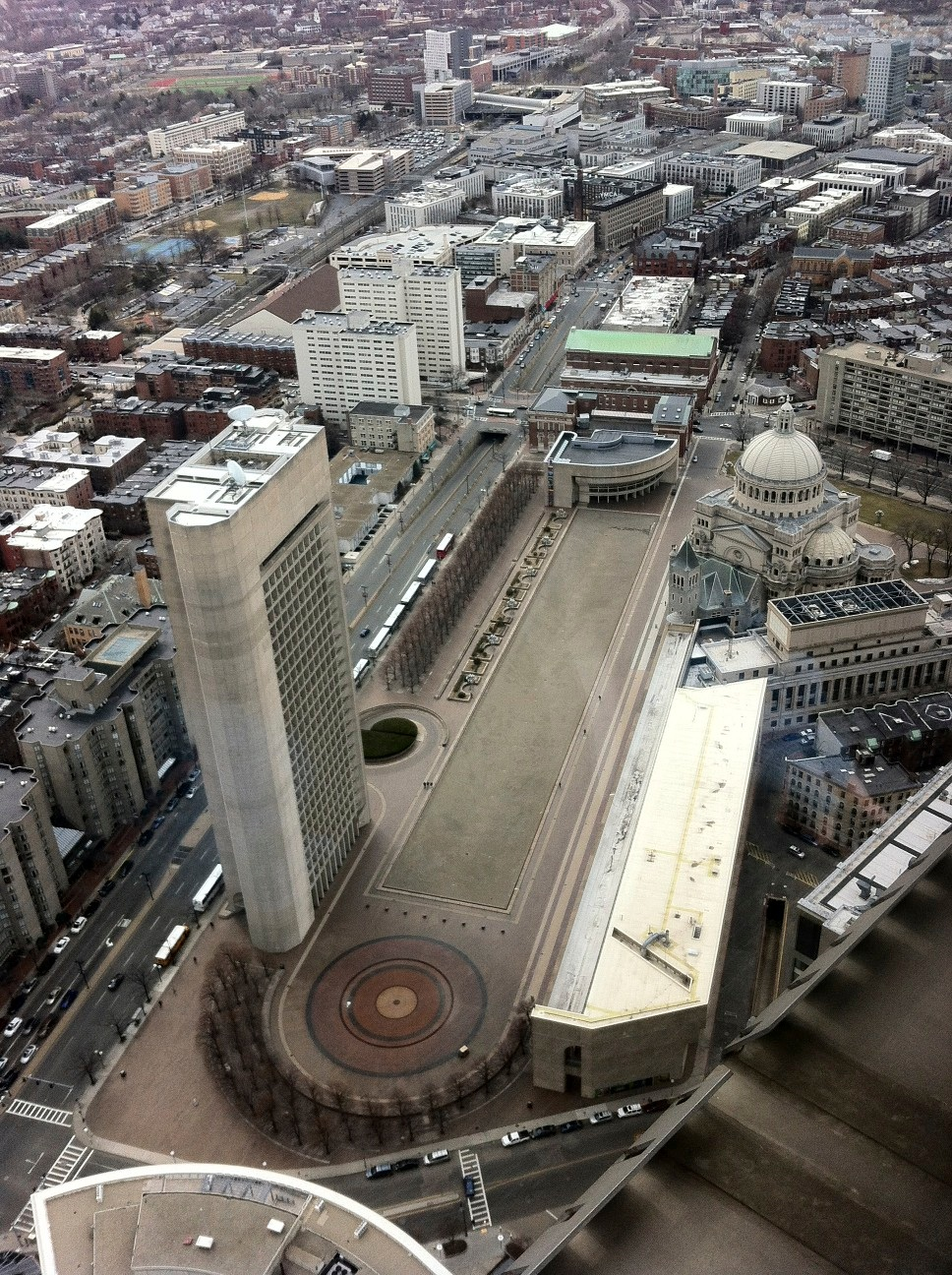
Aerial view of the skyscraper on the Christian Science Plaza

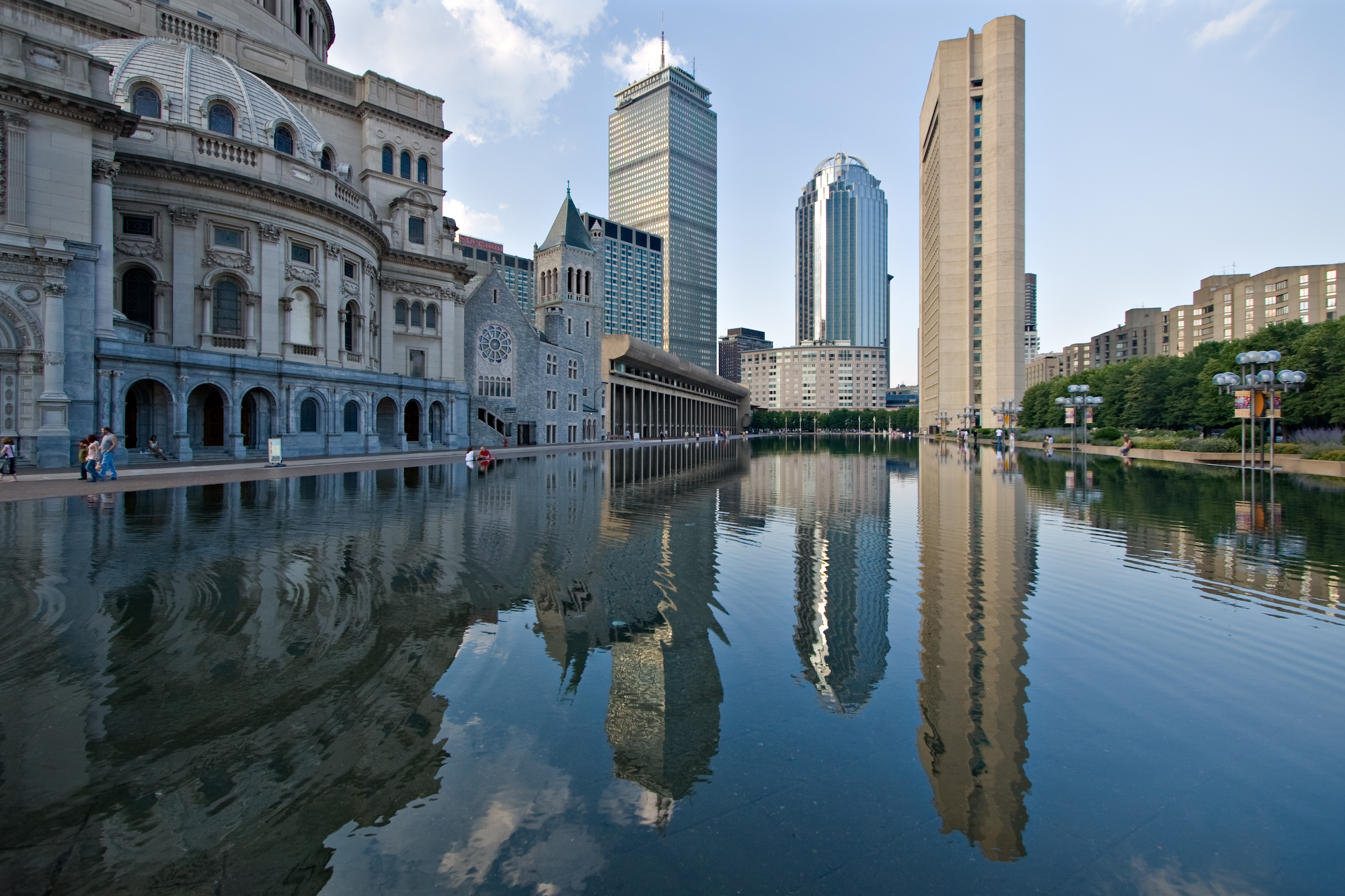
Surroundings of 177 Huntington on the Christian Science Plaza

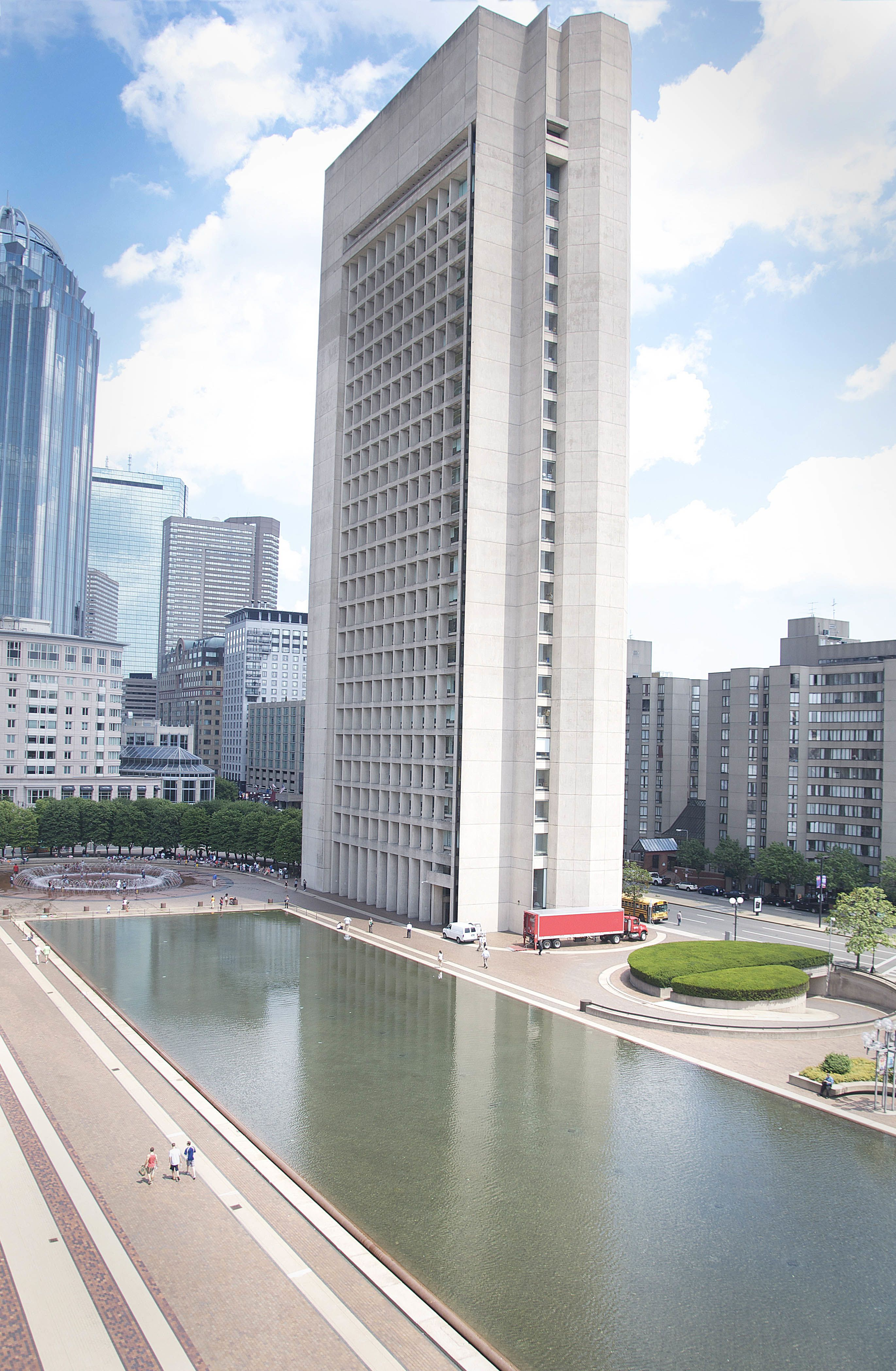
The reflection pool next to the skyscraper

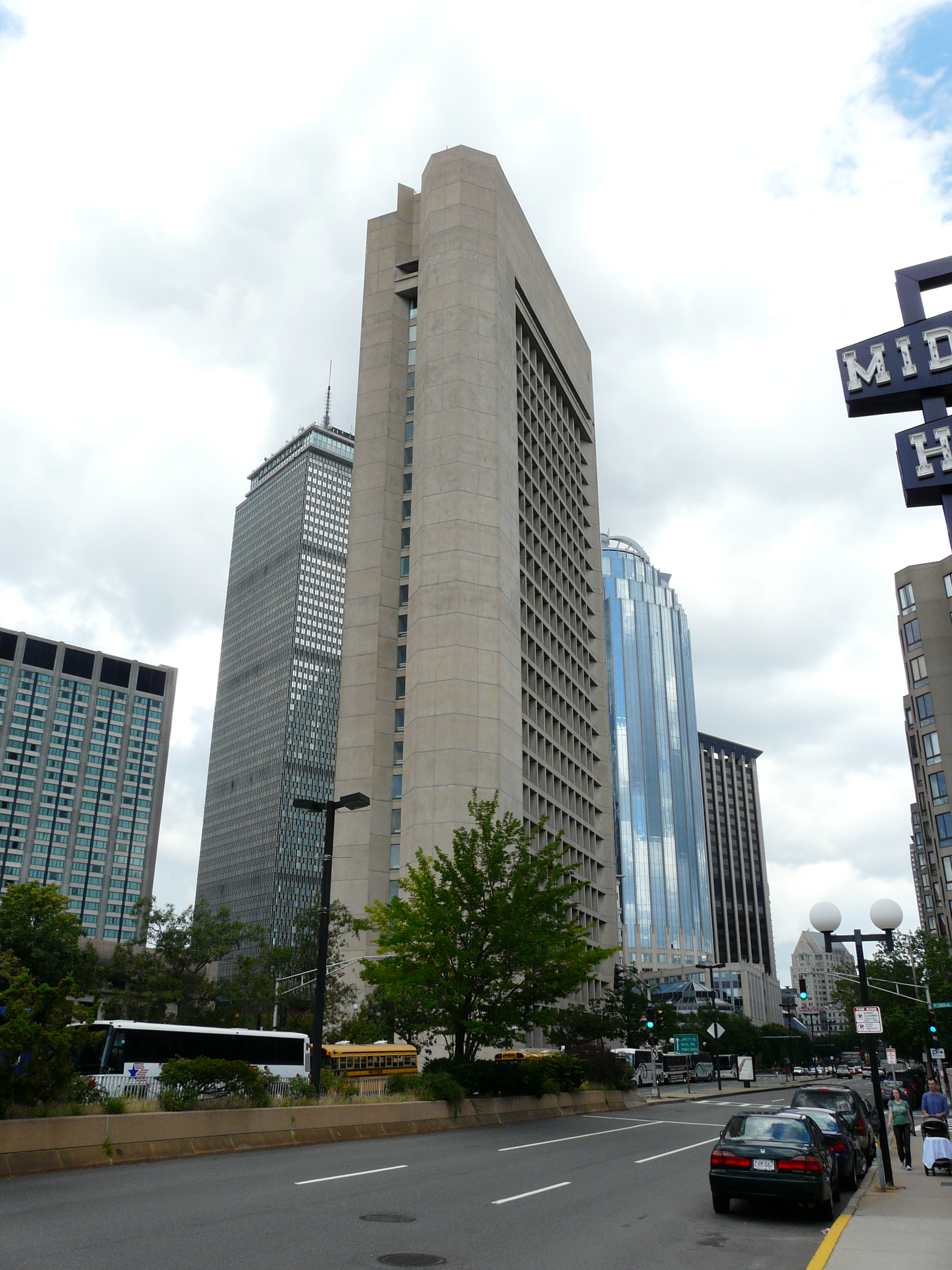
View from the west side of 177 Huntington

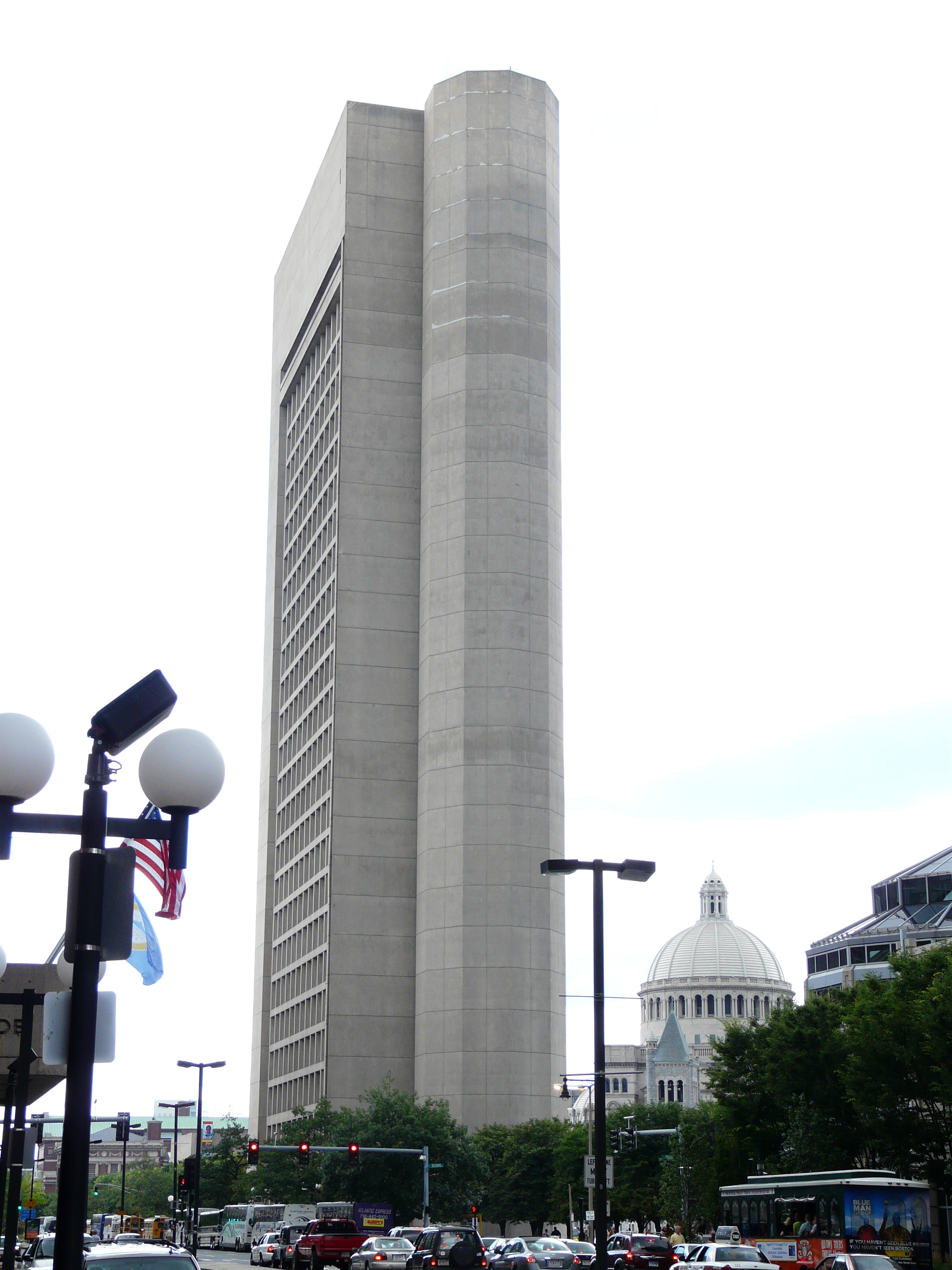
View from the east side of 177 Huntington

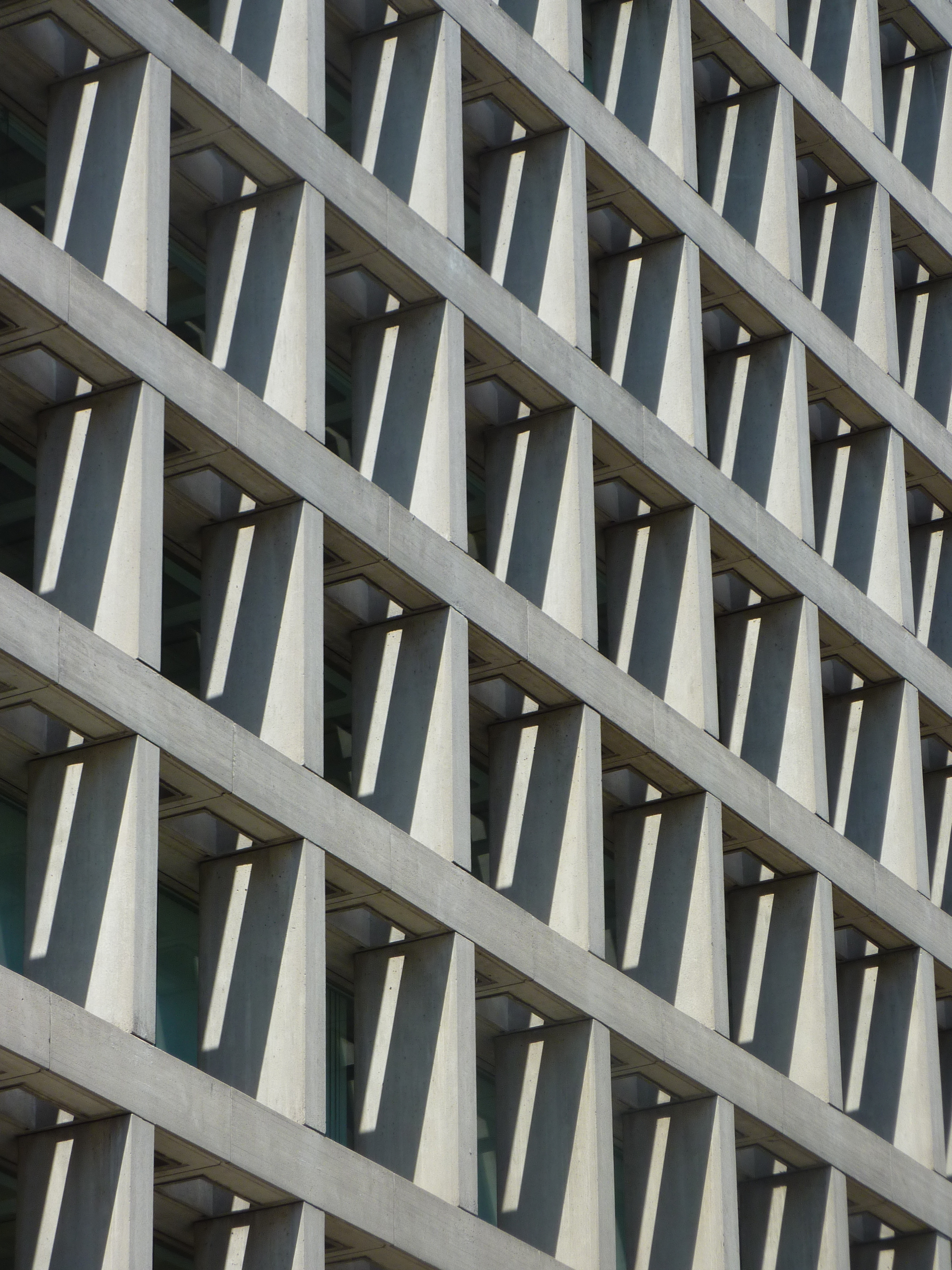
Close-up shot of building

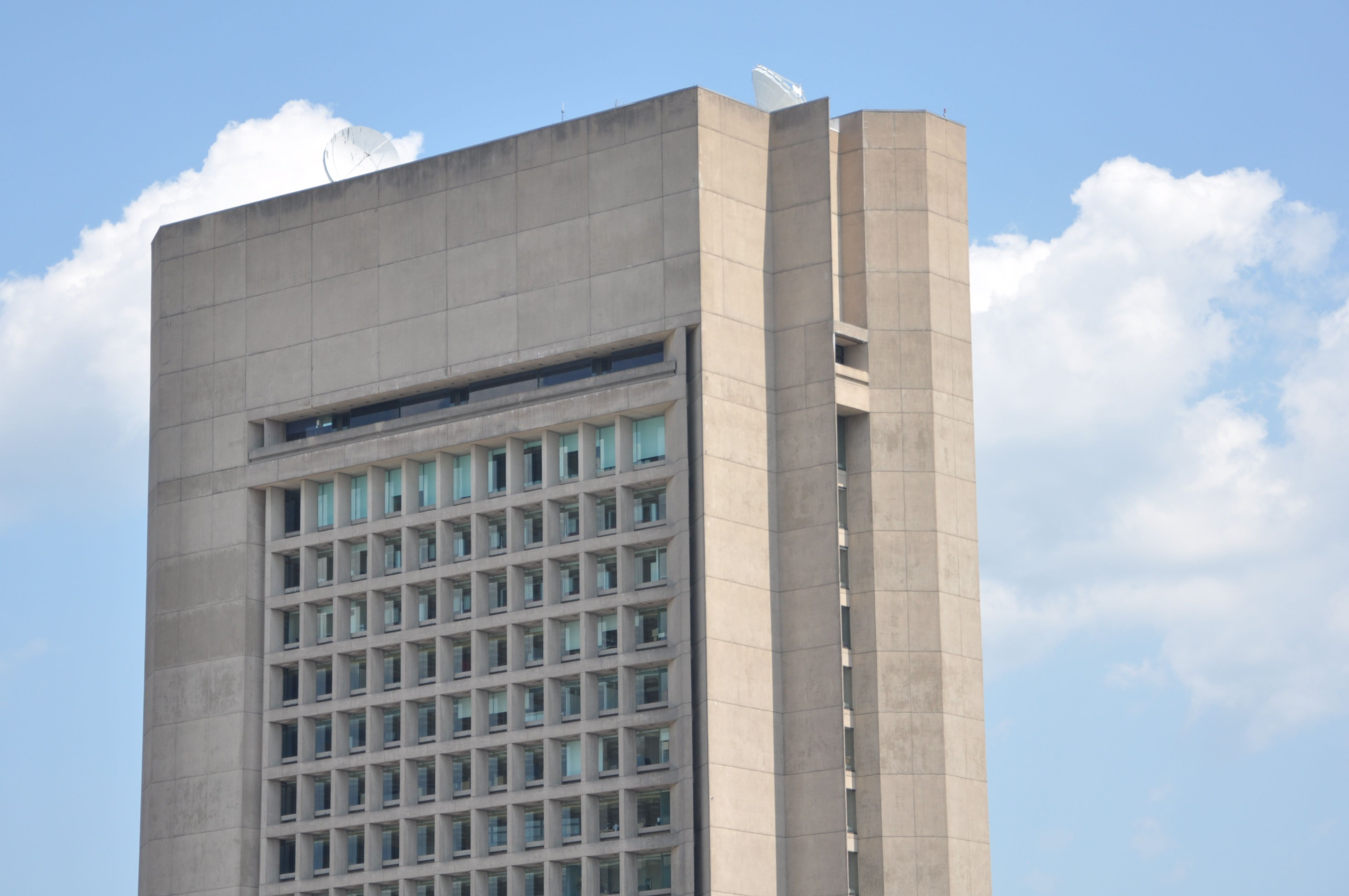
View of the top part of the skyscraper
