= Christian Science Plaza =

Building complex in Boston, Massachusetts

Coordinates: 42.3445°N 71.0843°W

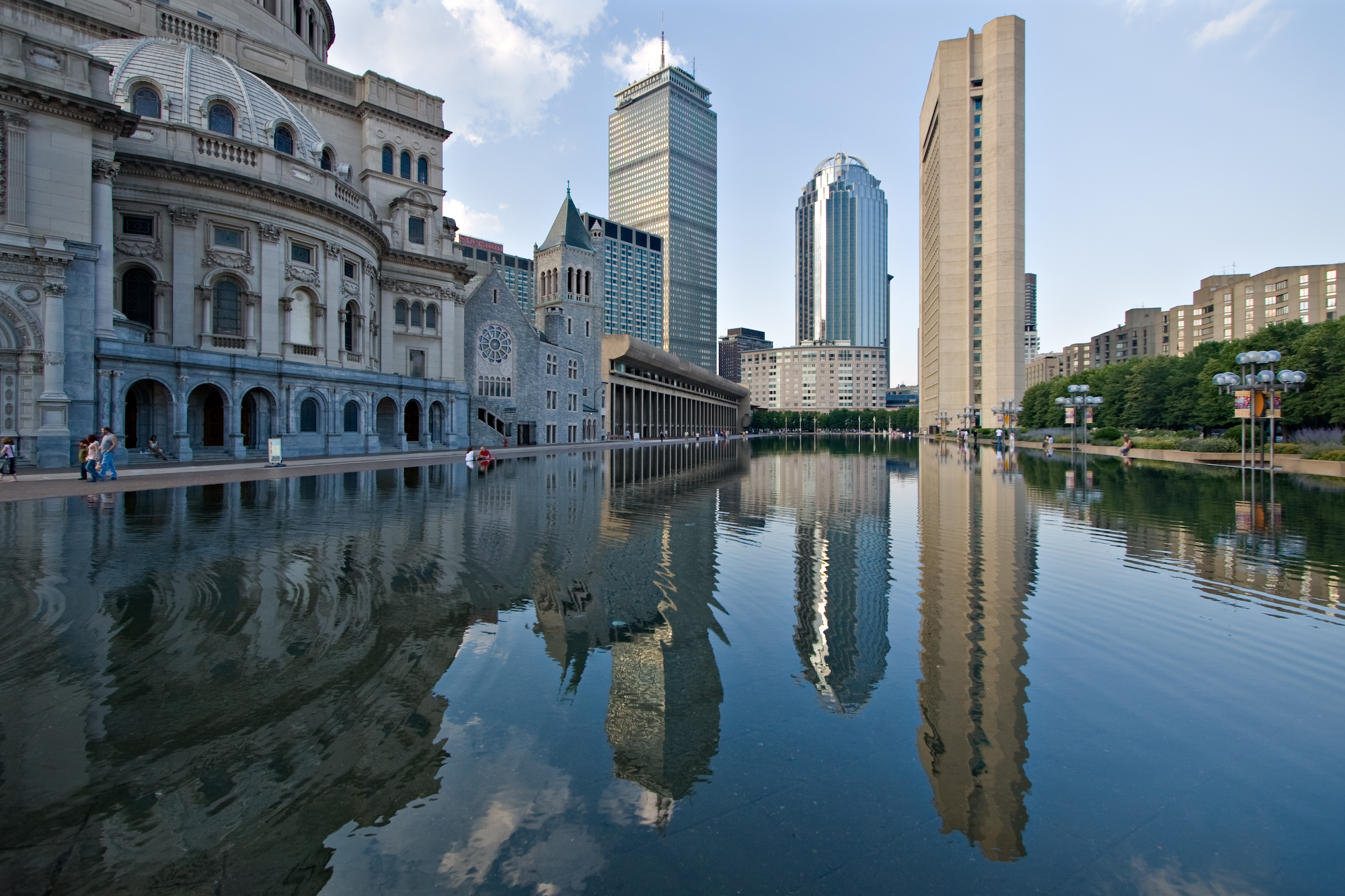
The First Church of Christ, Scientist (left), the reflecting pool, and the 26-story former administration building at 177 Huntington Avenue in Boston

The Christian Science Plaza is a 13.5-acre (5.5 ha) site on the corner of Massachusetts Avenue and Huntington Avenue in the Back Bay neighborhood of Boston, Massachusetts. The plaza, which is owned by the Church of Christ, Scientist (the Christian Science church), was designated as a Boston Landmark by the Boston Landmarks Commission in 2011, with the Commission describing it as a "heavily-used public space".

The site houses the religion's administrative center and its Mother Church, The First Church of Christ, Scientist.

== Buildings ==
The Christian Science Plaza comprises 10.4 acres (4.2 ha) of open space, a 690 × 100 ft (210 × 30 m) reflecting pool, a children's fountain, and six buildings:

- The First Church of Christ, Scientist, 250 Massachusetts Avenue, consisting of two buildings: the original Mother Church (1894) and the Church Extension (1906).
- Christian Science Publishing House (1934), 200–210 Massachusetts Avenue, built for the Christian Science Publishing Society, and now also housing the Mary Baker Eddy Library, Mapparium, The Christian Science Monitor and the church's administrative staff.
- Three buildings, designed by Araldo Cossutta of I. M. Pei & Associates, constructed when the site was extended in the 1970s:
  - Reflection Hall, the former Sunday School building (1971), 235 Huntington Avenue, at one end of the reflecting pool.
  - The Colonnade building (1972), 101 Belvidere Street.
  - 177 Huntington, formerly the Administration Building (1972). This 26-story building housed the church's administrative staff until 2008, when they moved to Christian Science Publishing House. The building is now leased out as office space.

== Gallery ==
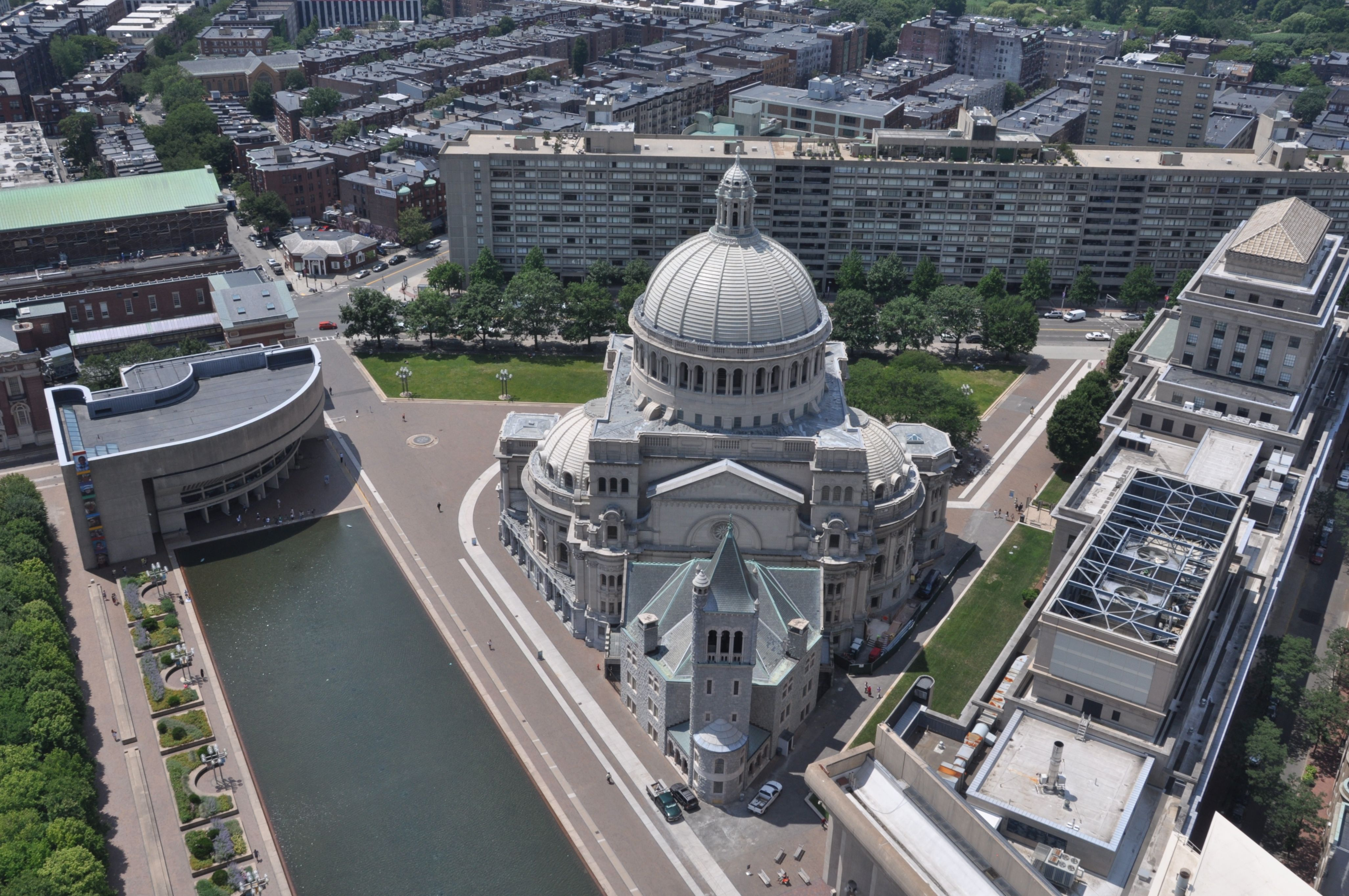
The First Church of Christ, Scientist and (left) Reflection Hall

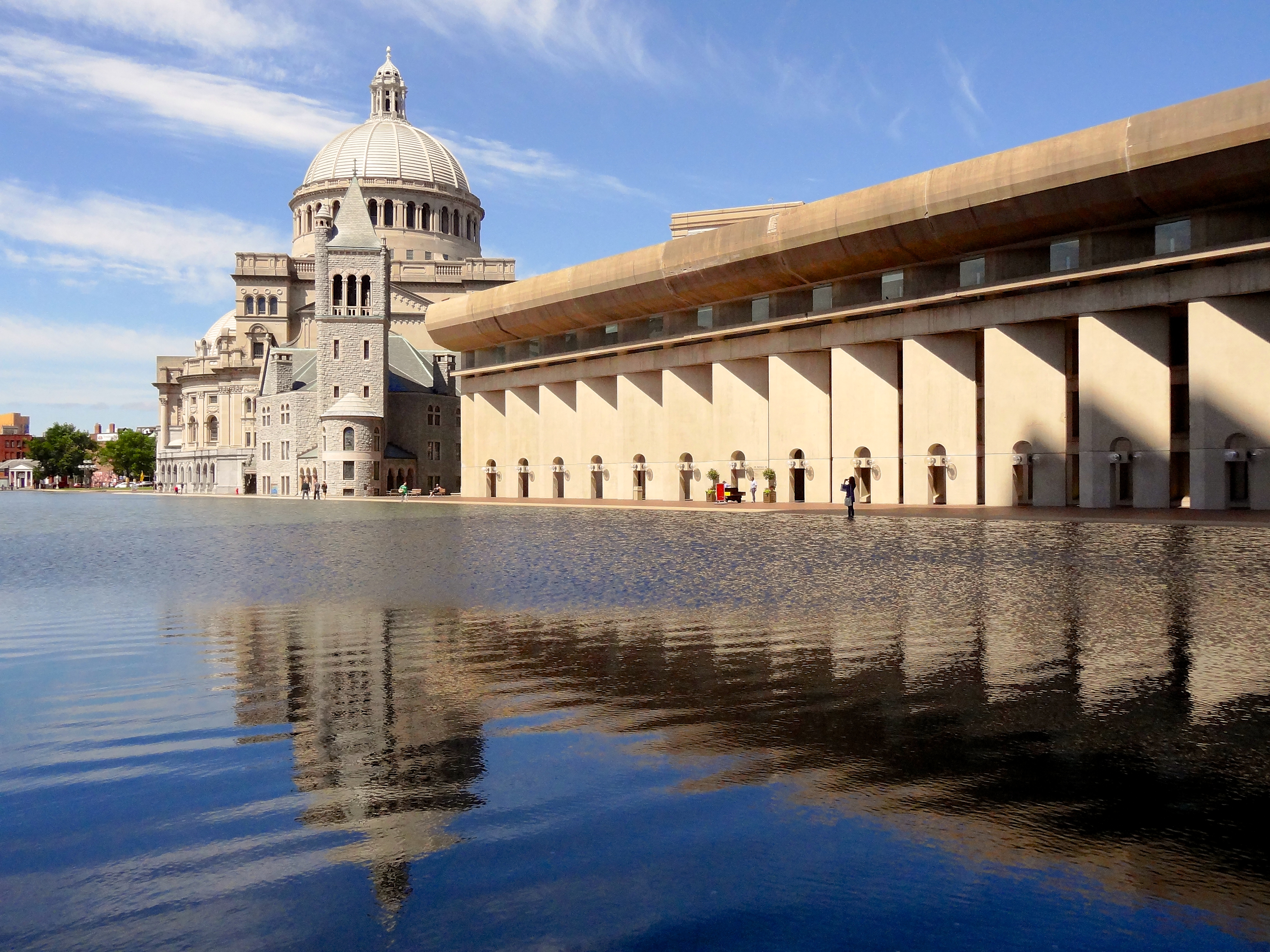
Mother Church, Colonnade building, reflecting pool

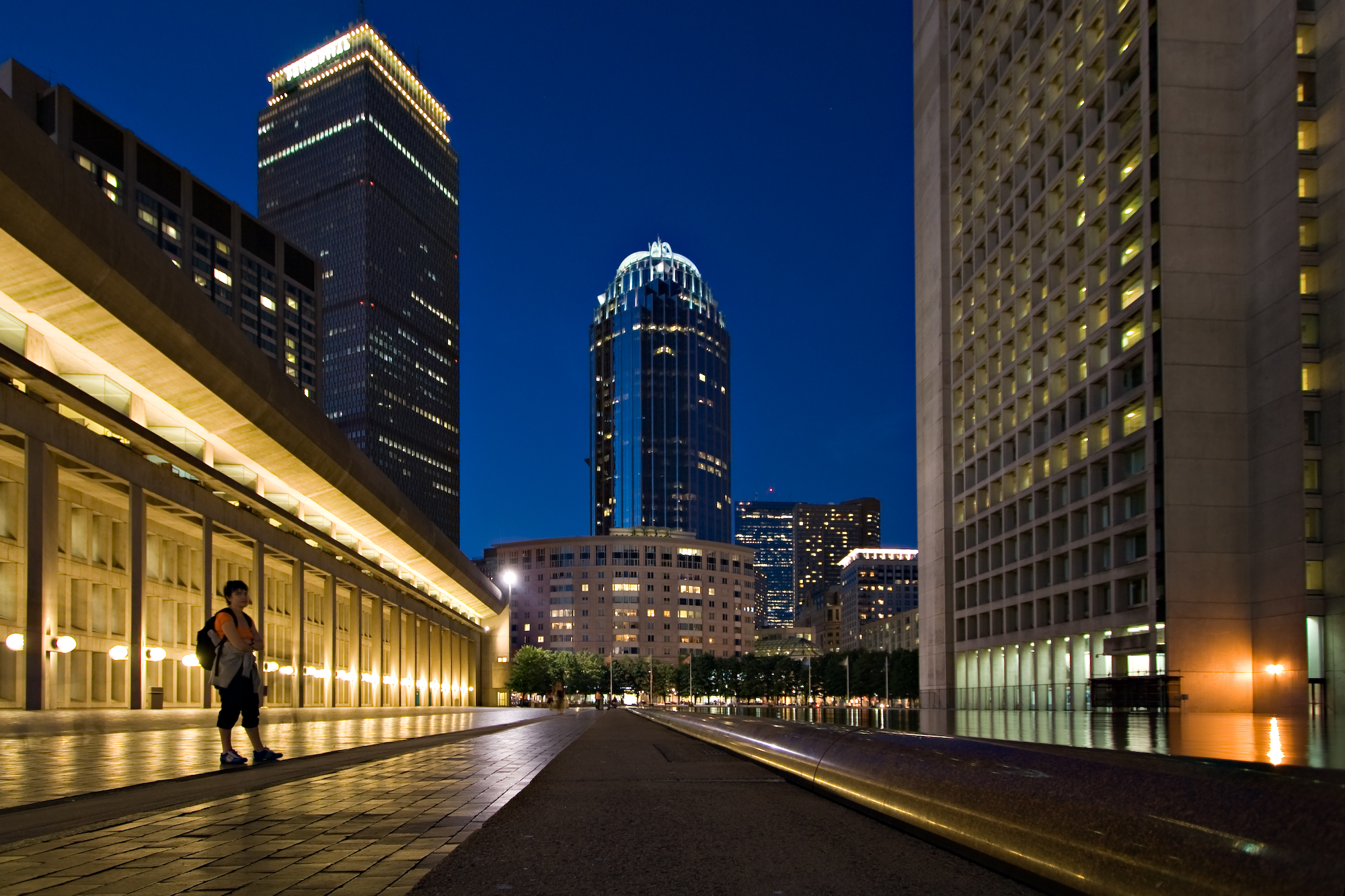
(left) Colonnade building and (right) 177 Huntington Avenue, former administration building

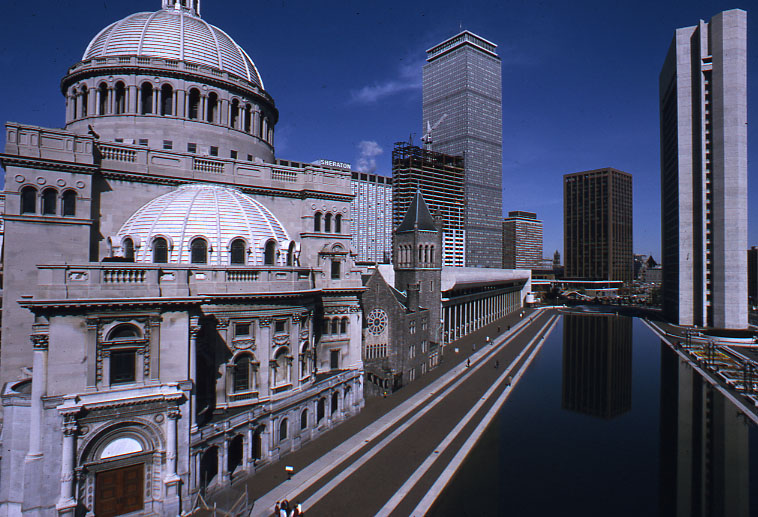
(left) the Mother Church, reflecting pool and (right) 177 Huntington Avenue

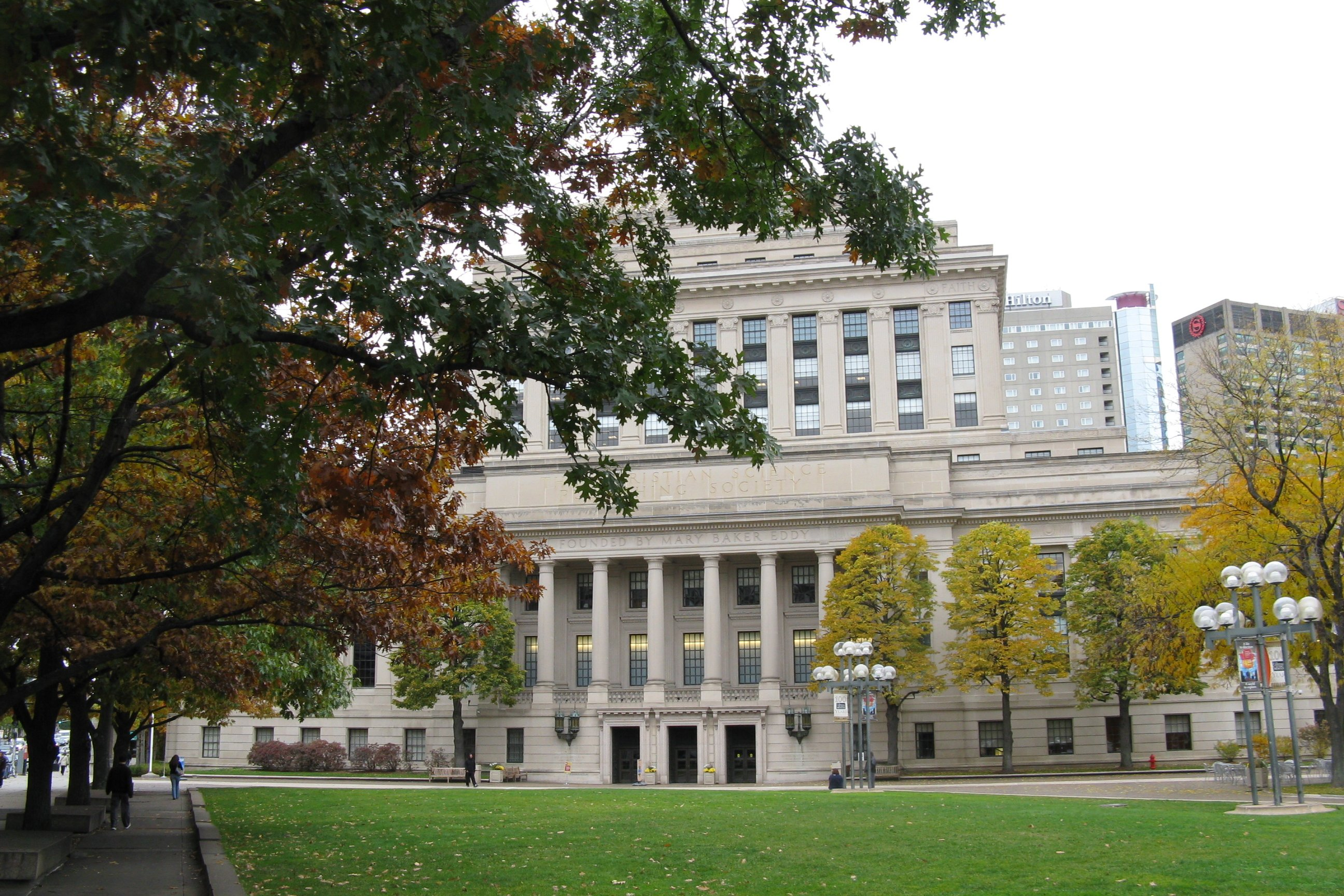
Christian Science Publishing House

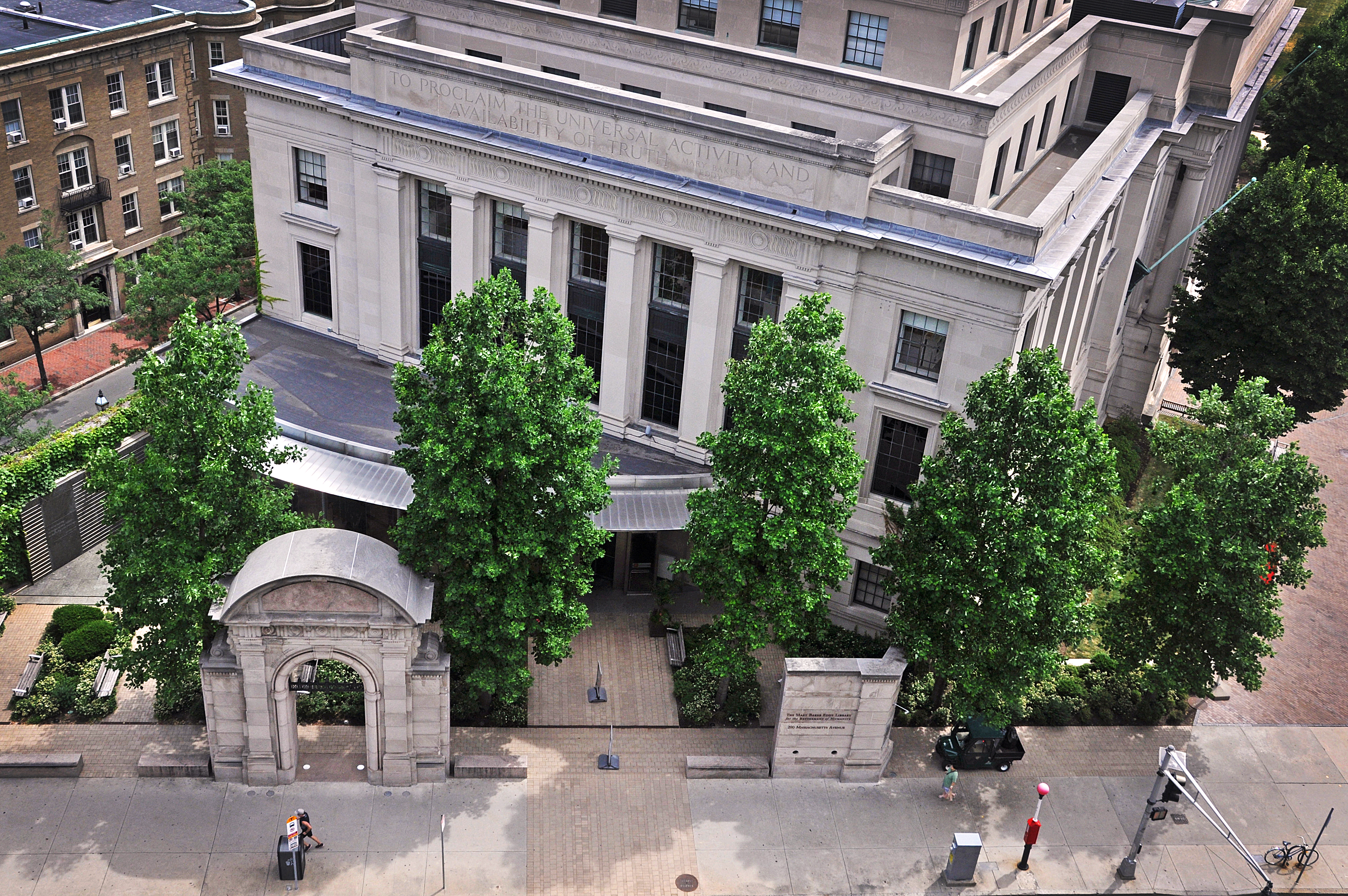
Mary Baker Eddy Library, part of Christian Science Publishing House

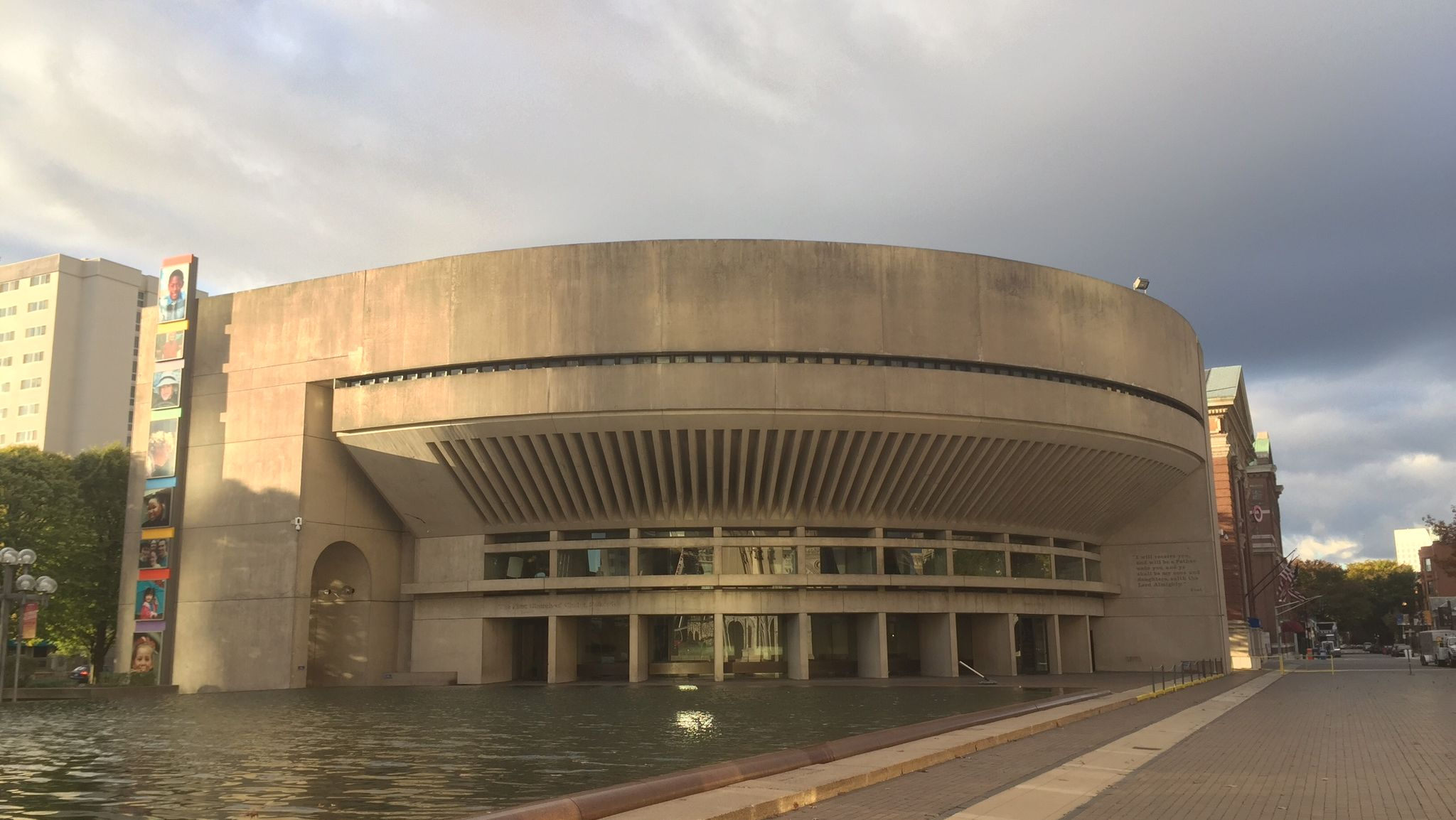
Reflection Hall (1973). Originally named the "Sunday School Building"

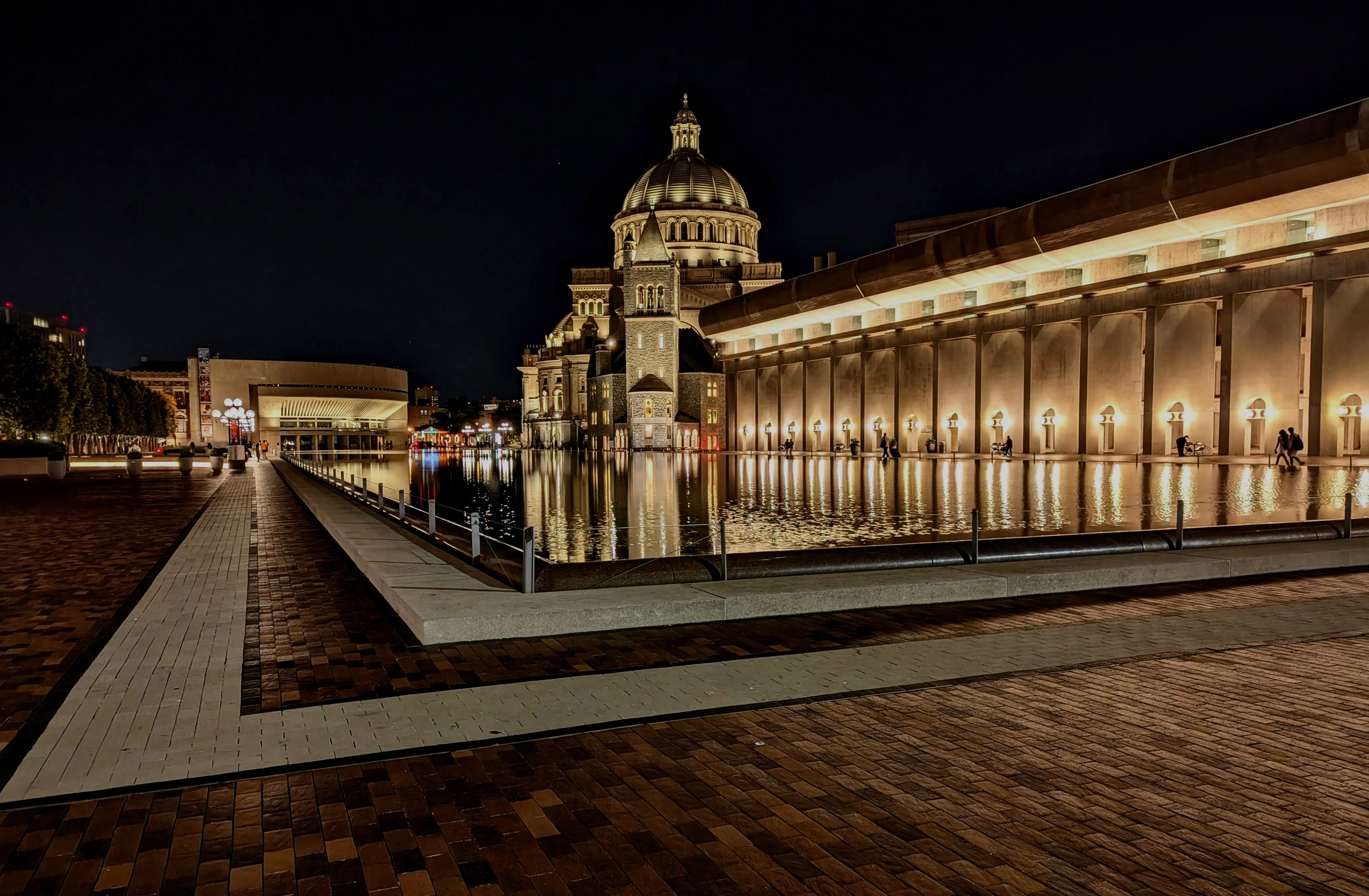
Reflecting pool at the Christian Science Plaza at night, July 19, 2024

== See also ==
- One Dalton
