= SoWa =

Coordinates: 42.342°N 71.065°W

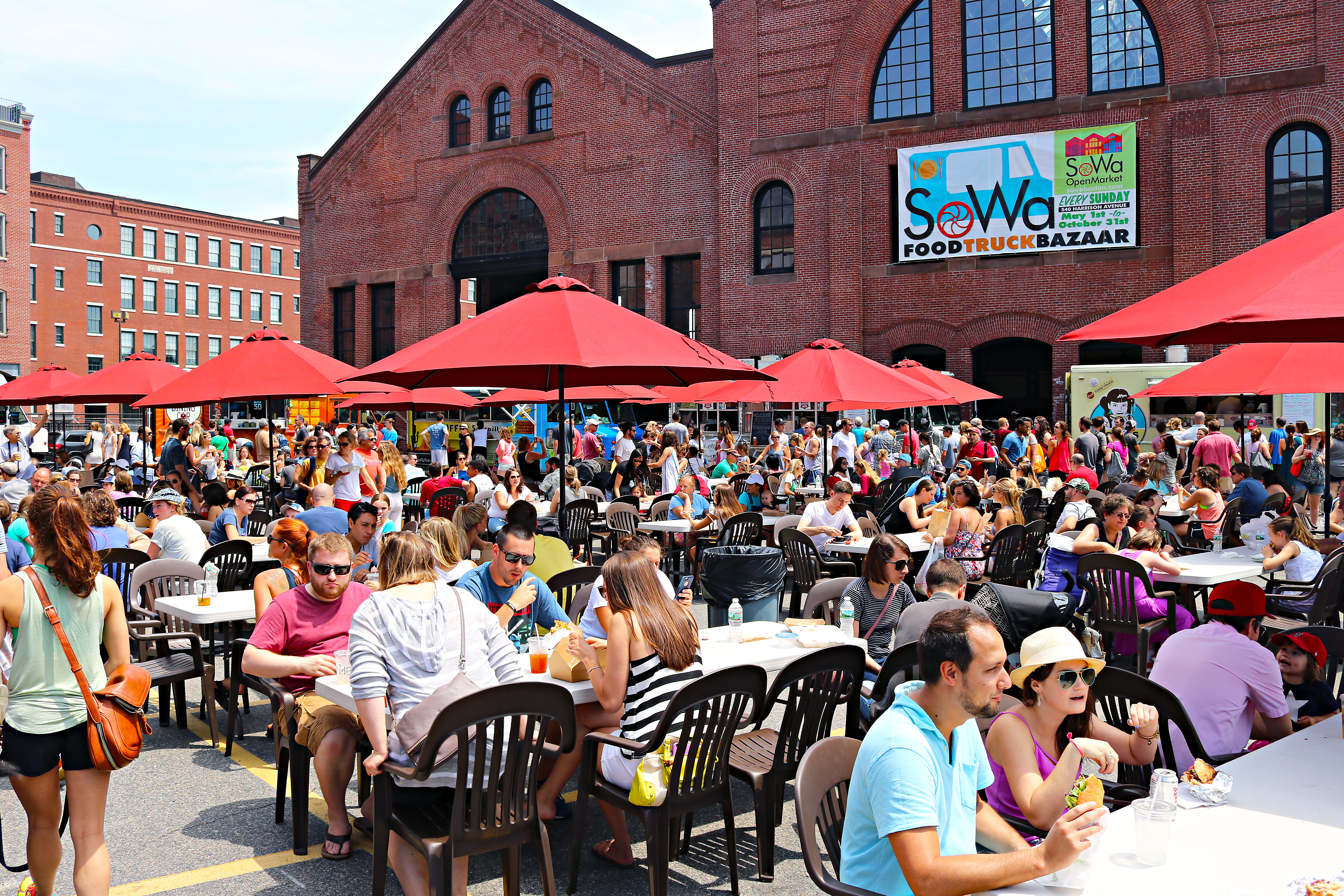
Food Trucks at the SoWa Open Market

The SoWa Art & Design District (South of Washington) in the South End of Boston, Massachusetts, USA, is a community of artist studios, contemporary art galleries, boutiques, design showrooms, and restaurants. It features the SoWa Open Market, the SoWa Vintage Market, and a residential neighborhood.

Originally derived from a shortening of "South of Washington", SoWa spans the area from East Brookline Street to East Berkeley Street and from Shawmut Avenue to Albany Street.

== History ==
GTI Properties and owner Mario Nicosia are credited with gentrifying the district beginning in the early 2000s and for inventing the SoWa name.

In the 19th century, SoWa's brick and beam factories were home to manufacturers of pianos, canned goods, shoes and other merchandise. In addition, 540 Harrison Ave, a building currently used to host markets and events, originally opened in 1891 as the Central Power Station for the West End Street Railway Company, the precursor to the MBTA. The Romanesque Revival and Gothic Revival structure was the world's largest electrical power station at the time and later became a trolley barn.

== Culture ==
Due to the number of artists and galleries located in the neighborhood, many events regarding art are held at SoWa. Every month, over 90 artists and galleries in SoWa stage their new 30-day shows, showing the works of established painters, photographers and sculptors. This event, known as "SoWa First Fridays", is held on the first Friday of every month from 5pm to 9pm. In addition, the SoWa Art Walk, an annual art festival held each spring, enables many artists to present their works and host open studios.

Opened in 2003, The SoWa Open Market provides an opportunity for local artisans to share their products. Each Sunday, many visitors from across New England converge in SoWa.
