= Jubilee Christian Church =

Church buildings in Massachusetts, United States of America

Coordinates: 42°16′23″N 71°5′37″W

Jubilee Christian Church International is a Christian church located in Boston, Massachusetts and Stoughton, Massachusetts. With a congregation of over 6,800, it is, according to the Boston Globe, the largest Protestant church in Eastern Massachusetts. The church operates New England's largest Christian bookstore, and hosts an annual gospel concert which draws some of the biggest names in gospel music.

According to the church's website, the teachings of the church ministry follow the fundamental truths of Christian orthodoxy. The church does not appear to be affiliated with a particular Christian denomination, though a Boston Herald article about the church describes it as Pentecostal. The church is part of the Church of God (Anderson, IN) reformation movement.

== Controversy ==
An editorial in the Boston Herald criticized the pastor for crossing the church/state line by telling the congregation how they should vote in the 2006 gubernatorial election

A $9.2 million office building that the church built in Dudley Square has been hailed as revitalization by some and decried as gentrification by others

== History ==
- 1982 New Covenant Christian Church founded by Rev. Gideon A. Thompson
- 1999 Rev. Thompson consecrated to the office of Bishop
- 2004 Name formally changed to Jubilee Christian Church, International.
- 2006 Jubilee Christian Church expands to the suburbs by buying the former Catholic Parish in Stoughton
- 2014 Pastor Matthew K. Thompson succeeds his father, Bishop Gideon Thompson as senior pastor.
