= Blackall (surname) =

Blackall is a surname. Notable people with the surname include:

- Clarence H. Blackall (1857–1942), American architect
- Emily Lucas Blackall (1832–1892), American writer and philanthropist
- Frederick Steele Blackall Jr. (1896–1963), American engineer
- Graham Blackall, American blogger
- Henry Blackall (1889–1981), Irish lawyer and judge
- Jasper Blackall (1920–2020), British sailor
- John Blackall (1771–1860), English physician
- Ofspring Blackall (1655–1716), English Anglican bishop and theologian
- Samuel Blackall (1809–1871), Irish soldier and politician
- Sophie Blackall, Australian artist and illustrator of children's books
- William Blackall (1876–1941), Australian botanist
