= New England Council =

The New England Council
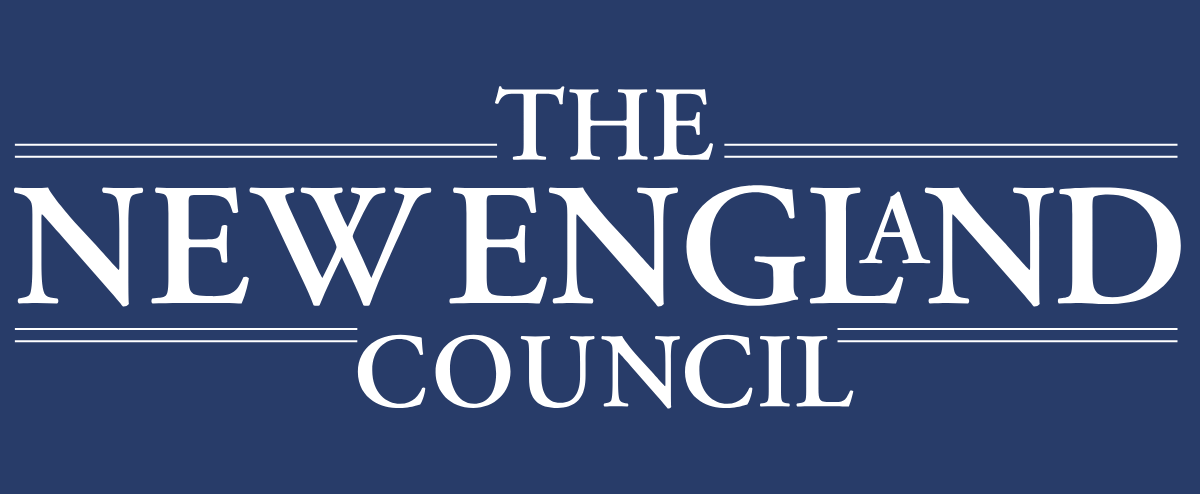
- Abbreviation: NEC
- Formation: November 1925; 101 years ago
- Founder: New England Conference
- Founded at: Worcester, Massachusetts
- Type: Regional association; lobby
- Purpose: Promotion of economic growth and high quality of life in New England
- Headquarters: Boston, Massachusetts and Washington, D.C.
- Region served: New England
- Chairman: John T. Hailer
- Treasurer: John W. Stadtler
- President & CEO: James T. Brett
- Website: newenglandcouncil.com

The New England Council is a regional business association representing both public and private organizations in the New England region of the United States. Established in 1925, it is the oldest regional business association in the United States.

== History ==
A group of New England business leaders along with the states' six governors convened in Poland Spring, Maine in June 1925 to tackle issues related to economic growth in the region. This led to the first annual "New England Conference" later that year in Worcester, Massachusetts. According to the Council's own historical record, around "800 representatives of agricultural, industrial, and commercial organizations throughout New England" gathered during this conference to discuss "challenges facing the New England economy"; it was then that they decided to make the conference an annual event, and to establish the New England Council as the conference's executive body. The New England Council's success demonstrated that regional approaches to economic issues could prove useful.

In 1962, the New England Council helped spearhead efforts to relax quotas on petroleum imports in the United States.

A forum on the heroin and opioid epidemic in New England was hosted by the NEC in November 2015. The forum included several US senators as well as the governors of New Hampshire and Massachusetts.

In June 2016, Massachusetts governor Charlie Baker indicated at a New England Council breakfast that the New England states would begin sharing information about prescription drug usage and monitoring.

New Hampshire senator Jeanne Shaheen addressed the New England Council in Bedford, New Hampshire in July 2016, arguing against isolationism in US politics and emphasizing the need to address the heroin and opioid epidemic facing the country, with New England in particular.

== Mission ==
The NEC claims that its mission is "to identify and support federal public policies and articulate the voice of its membership regionally and nationally on important issues facing New England." In effect, it acts as a lobby in Washington, D.C., advocating for the region's economic interests, ranging from private enterprise to academia to public policies and projects.

== Leadership ==
The first president of the New England Council was John S. Lawrence. He was succeeded by former Vermont Governor Redfield Proctor. Other former presidents include Ralph Flanders, Frederick Steele Blackall Jr., Laurence F. Whittemore, Hugh Gregg, Charles Franklin Phillips, and Joseph A. Erickson.

In 1977, the council hired former Massachusetts Port Authority executive director Edward J. King to serve as its first full-time president. He remained with the council until 1977, when he resigned to run for Governor of Massachusetts. Since 1996, James T. Brett has been president and chief executive officer of the New England Council.

=== CEOs ===
- Edward J. King (1975–1977)
- Eric Swider (1977–1986)
- Gale Merseth (1986–1987)
- Bonnie Newman (1988–1989)
- Nicholas Koskores (1989–1991)
- Peter Meade (1992–1996)
- James T. Brett (1996–present)
