= Joseph A. Erickson =

American bank executive

Joseph Austin Erickson (January 8, 1896 – March 14, 1983) was an American bank executive who served as president of the Federal Reserve Bank of Boston from 1948 to 1961.

== Early life ==
Erickson was born on January 8, 1896, in Lynn, Massachusetts to Emil Svante Erickson and Anna (Jacobson) Erickson. He graduated from Lynn Classical High School. He worked in a Lynn department store, at the General Electric River Works plant, and as a bellhop on Cape Cod in order to fund his education at Harvard College. He left Harvard in 1917 for the First Officers Training Training Camp in Plattsburgh, New York. He served as a first lieutenant in the United States Army Coast Artillery Corps during World War I and then served on the repatriation section of the American Commission to Negotiate Peace. He returned to Harvard after the war, where he earned his Bachelor of Arts degree and attended Harvard Business School for one year.

== Career ==
In 1920, Erickson joined Shawmut Bank as a clerk. In 1925 he was made manager of the credit department and was named manager of the Arlington Street branch later that year. In 1928 he was made a vice president. In 1942, he was promoted to executive vice president, which made him the third highest-ranking officer in the company. In 1948 he was named president of the Federal Reserve Bank of Boston. His twelve years of service make him the second-longest serving president in the Boston Fed's history.

Erickson also served as president of the New England Council and was a director of several companies, including Boston Edison.

== Personal life ==
Erickson and his wife, Esther Reece Stevens, had three children. He was a longtime resident of Wellesley Hills, Massachusetts and spent his final two years in an assisted living facility in Wrentham, Massachusetts, where he died on March 14, 1983.

Other offices
Preceded by Laurence F. Whittemore	President of the Federal Reserve Bank of Boston; 1946–1948	Succeeded by George H. Ellis
