= Susan M. Collins (economist) =

American economist

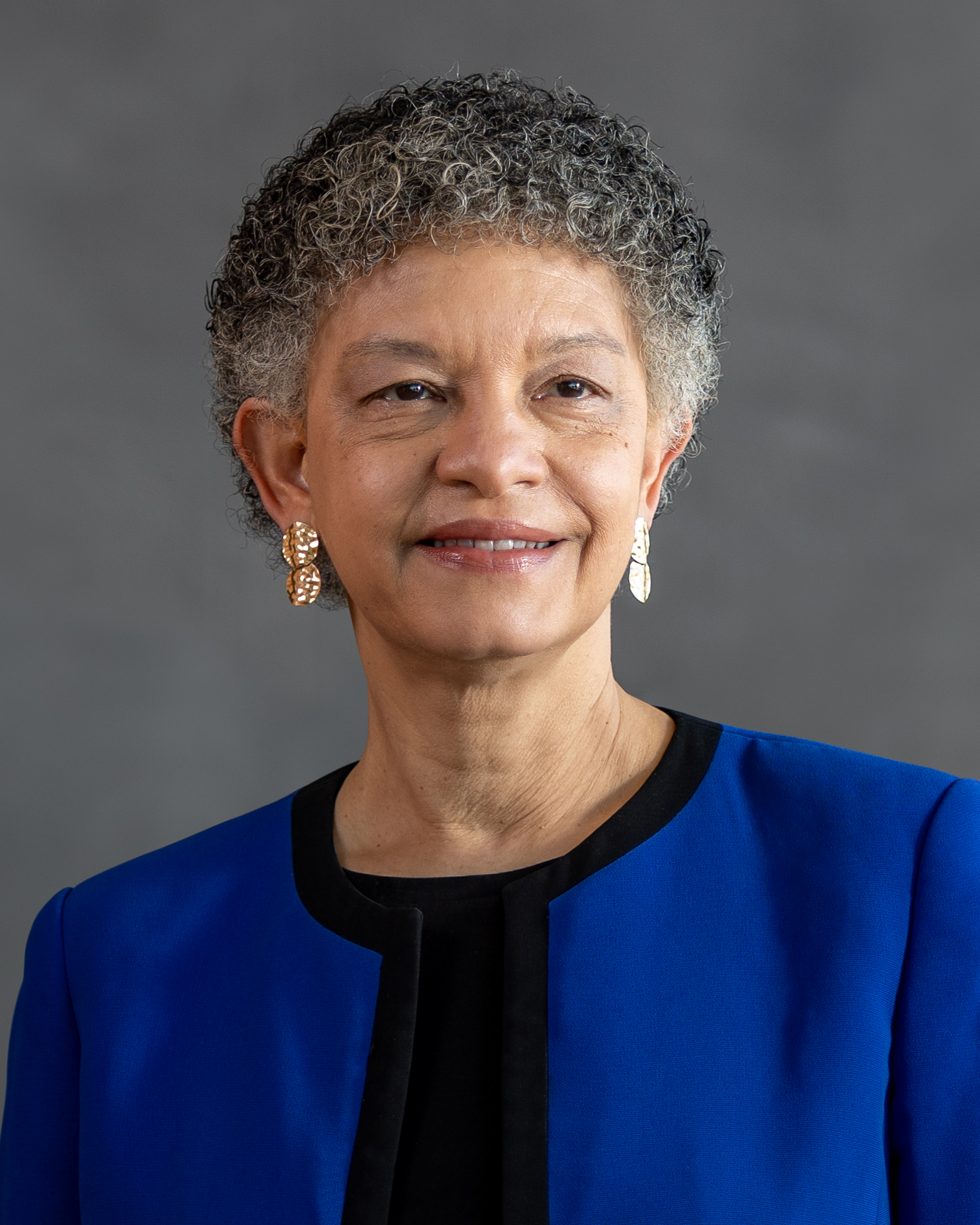

President of the Federal Reserve Bank of Boston
- Incumbent
- Assumed office July 1, 2022
- Preceded by: Eric S. Rosengren

Provost of the University of Michigan
- In office 2020–2022
- Preceded by: Martin Philbert
- Succeeded by: Laurie McCauley

Personal details
- Born: Susan Margaret Collins; 1958 or 1959 (age 67–68) Scotland, UK
- Spouse: Donald Vereen
- Education: Harvard University (BA); Massachusetts Institute of Technology (PhD)
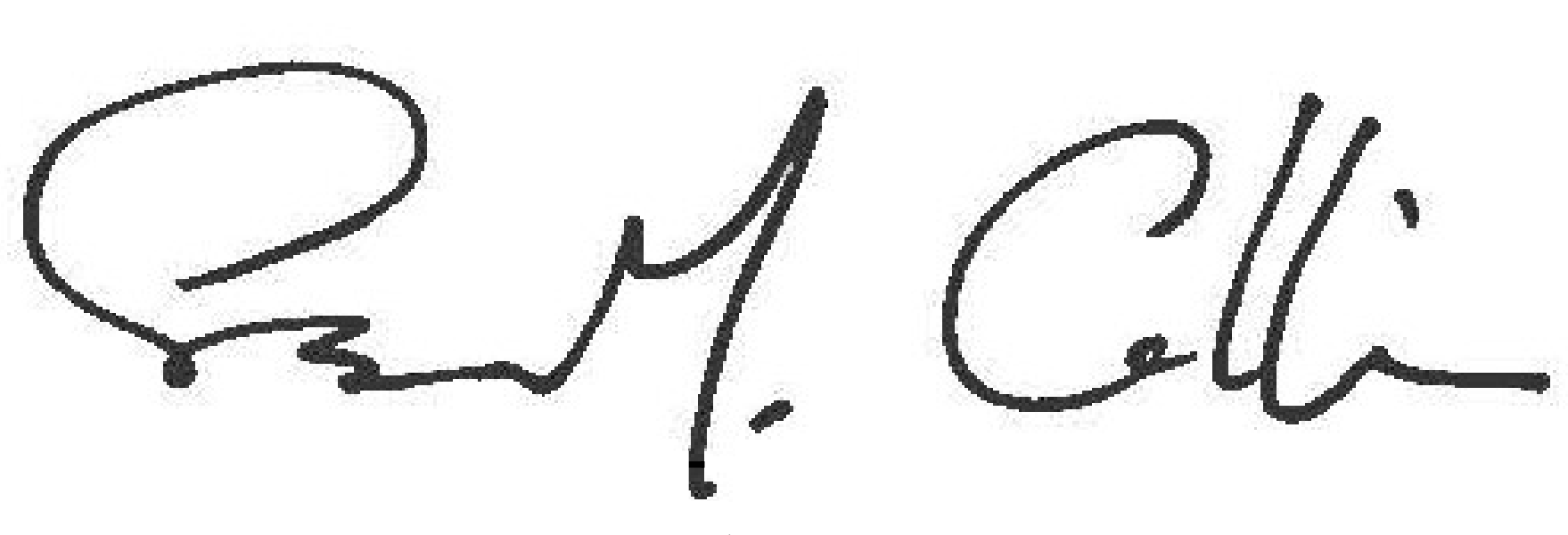
- Signature

Academic background
- Thesis: Devaluations, Fixed Exchange Rates and Credibility Crises (1984)

Academic work
- Discipline: Economics
- Sub-discipline: International macroeconomics
- Institutions: Harvard University; Georgetown University; University of Michigan; Brookings Institution

Susan Margaret Collins (born 1958/1959) is an American economist who has served as the 14th president and CEO of the Federal Reserve Bank of Boston since July 1, 2022. She is the first African American woman and first woman of color to lead any of the 12 regional Federal Reserve Banks. Collins previously served as the 16th provost and executive vice president for academic affairs of the University of Michigan from 2020 to 2022.

== Early life and education ==
Collins is a naturalized U.S. citizen of Jamaican descent, born in Scotland and raised in New York City. She graduated summa cum laude from Harvard University with a Bachelor of Arts in economics in 1980 and earned her PhD in economics from the Massachusetts Institute of Technology (MIT) in 1984. Her PhD dissertation was Devaluations, fixed exchange rates and credibility crises, supervised by Rudiger Dornbusch.

== Career ==
Collins joined the faculty of Harvard University as an assistant professor in 1984. She moved to Washington, D.C., in 1992 and divided her time between Georgetown University and the Brookings Institution before joining the University of Michigan in 2007. She also served on the President's Council of Economic Advisers from 1989 to 1990 and was a visiting scholar at the International Monetary Fund in 2001.

She was a senior fellow in the Economic Studies program at the Brookings Institution from 2007 to 2017 and became a nonresident senior fellow after her move to Michigan.

She served on the Federal Reserve Bank of Chicago board of directors from 2013 to 2022.

Collins is the Edward M. Gramlich Professor of Public Policy and a professor of economics at the University of Michigan, where she also served as dean of the Gerald R. Ford School of Public Policy from 2007 to 2017. She retains the designation of a professor at the university, on unpaid leave. In January 2020, Collins was appointed provost and executive vice president for academic affairs at the University of Michigan. As she stepped down as provost in June 2022, Michigan's Board of Regents awarded her a Regents' Citation of Honor for her dedication and service to the university.

Collins was involved in the controversy surrounding the University of Michigan's reopening during the COVID-19 pandemic. On September 8, 2020, the university's graduate student employees went on strike because of concerns related to the university's pandemic response. As the university's chief academic officer, Collins was involved in negotiations with the graduate students while also urging students not to disrupt campus operations and claiming that the strike was illegal because it was not directly related to "wages, hours, or working conditions." The students disagreed, claiming that the strike directly related to the university's failure to provide a safe working environment which was required by the contract it agreed to only months prior. In a publicly broadcast question and answer session on September 15, 2020, Collins said of the administration's pandemic response: “We have not done nearly as well as we needed to.”

In 2025, the American Economic Association named Collins a Distinguished Fellow, an award recognizing lifetime contributions to economics.

== Federal Reserve Bank of Boston ==
In February 2022, Collins was selected to serve as president and CEO of the Federal Reserve Bank of Boston, becoming the first woman of color to lead any of the 12 regional Reserve Banks. She took office on July 1, 2022. In 2025, she was reappointed to the position, extending her term until 2031.

== Selected publications ==
- Bosworth, Barry, and Susan M. Collins. "Accounting for growth: comparing China and India." Journal of Economic Perspectives 22, no. 1 (2008): 45–66.
- Collins, Susan M., Barry P. Bosworth, and Dani Rodrik. "Economic growth in East Asia: accumulation versus assimilation." Brookings papers on economic activity 1996, no. 2 (1996): 135–203.
- Bosworth, Barry P., Susan M. Collins, and Carmen M. Reinhart. "Capital flows to developing economies: implications for saving and investment." Brookings papers on economic activity 1999, no. 1 (1999): 143–180.
- Razin, Ofair, and Susan M. Collins. Real exchange rate misalignments and growth. No. w6174. National Bureau of Economic Research, 1997.
- Collins, Susan M. "On becoming more flexible: Exchange rate regimes in Latin America and the Caribbean." Journal of Development Economics 51, no. 1 (1996): 117–138.
- Collins, Susan M. "Savings and Growth Experiences of Korea and Japan." Journal of the Japanese and International Economies 2 (1988): 328-350

Other offices
Preceded by Eric S. Rosengren	President of the Federal Reserve Bank of Boston; 2022–present	Incumbent
