= Richard F. Syron =

Richard Syron
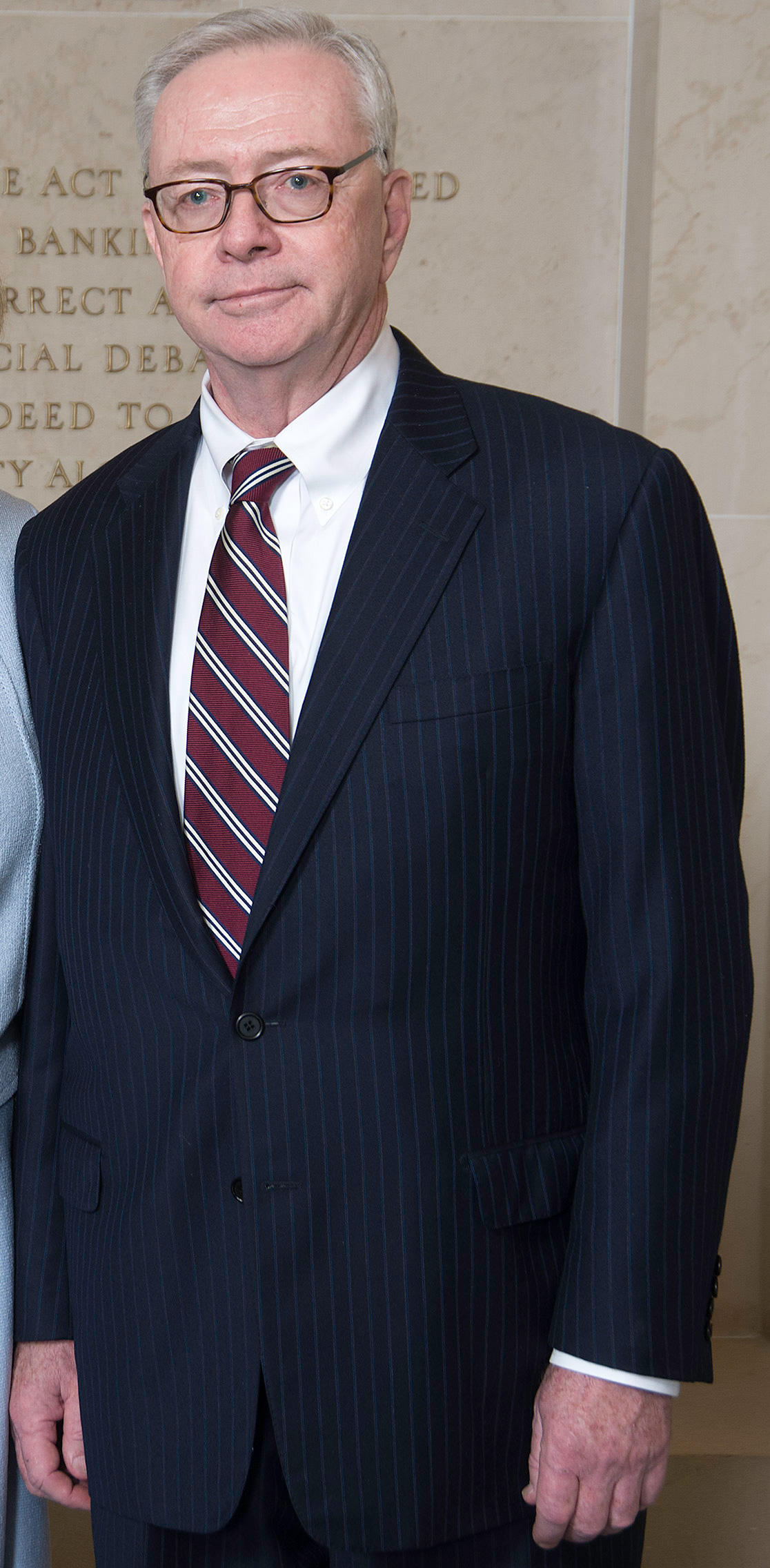

11th President of the Federal Reserve Bank of Boston
- In office January 1, 1989 – March 31, 1994
- Preceded by: Frank Morris
- Succeeded by: Cathy Minehan

Personal details
- Born: October 25, 1943 (age 83) Boston, Massachusetts, U.S.
- Education: Boston College (BA); Tufts University (MA, PhD)

Richard F. Syron is a former chairman and chief executive officer of the Federal Home Loan Mortgage Corporation, commonly known as Freddie Mac. He previously was chairman and CEO of Thermo Electron Corp., and as CEO of the American Stock Exchange.

== Early life and education ==
Syron graduated from Boston College with a bachelor's degree, and earned advanced degrees in economics from Tufts University.

== Career ==
=== Paul Volcker and Federal Reserve of Boston ===
He was assistant to Paul Volcker, then the chairman of the Federal Reserve Board, in 1981 and 1982, and previously was deputy assistant secretary of the United States Treasury.

Syron held a senior post at the Federal Reserve Bank of Boston from 1989 through 1994, and was a member of the Federal Open Market Committee, which sets monetary policy.

=== American Stock Exchange ===
He joined the American Stock Exchange as CEO in 1994 held that post for five years, which included its merger in 1998 into the National Association of Securities Dealers.

=== Thermo Electron and Freddie Mac ===
Syron became chief executive officer of Thermo Electron in June 1999. After serving as its executive chairman, he was appointed chairman and CEO of Freddie Mac in December 2003. In 2004, David Andrukonis, the chief risk officer of Freddie Mac, warned Syron of increasing risk in Freddie Mac's portfolio. Syron declined to act. In December 2007, Syron told financial analysts that he expected Freddie Mac would incur heavy losses because of the weakening housing market and rising mortgage defaults. Despite these forecasts, and concerns over the fiscal stability of Freddie Mac due to larger-than-expected write-offs, Syron reportedly took home over $19 million in cash, stocks, and other executive compensation in 2007. Syron was terminated September 6, 2008, under a Federal Housing Finance Agency plan for conservatorship of Freddie Mac. It was not known at the time if he would receive a severance package.

On December 9, 2008, he testified before the United States House Committee on Oversight and Government Reform on Capitol Hill regarding Fannie Mae, Freddie Mac, and financial market instability.

Other offices
Preceded by Frank Morris	President of the Federal Reserve Bank of Boston; 1989–1994	Succeeded by Cathy Minehan
