= Eric S. Rosengren =

American economist

Eric Rosengren
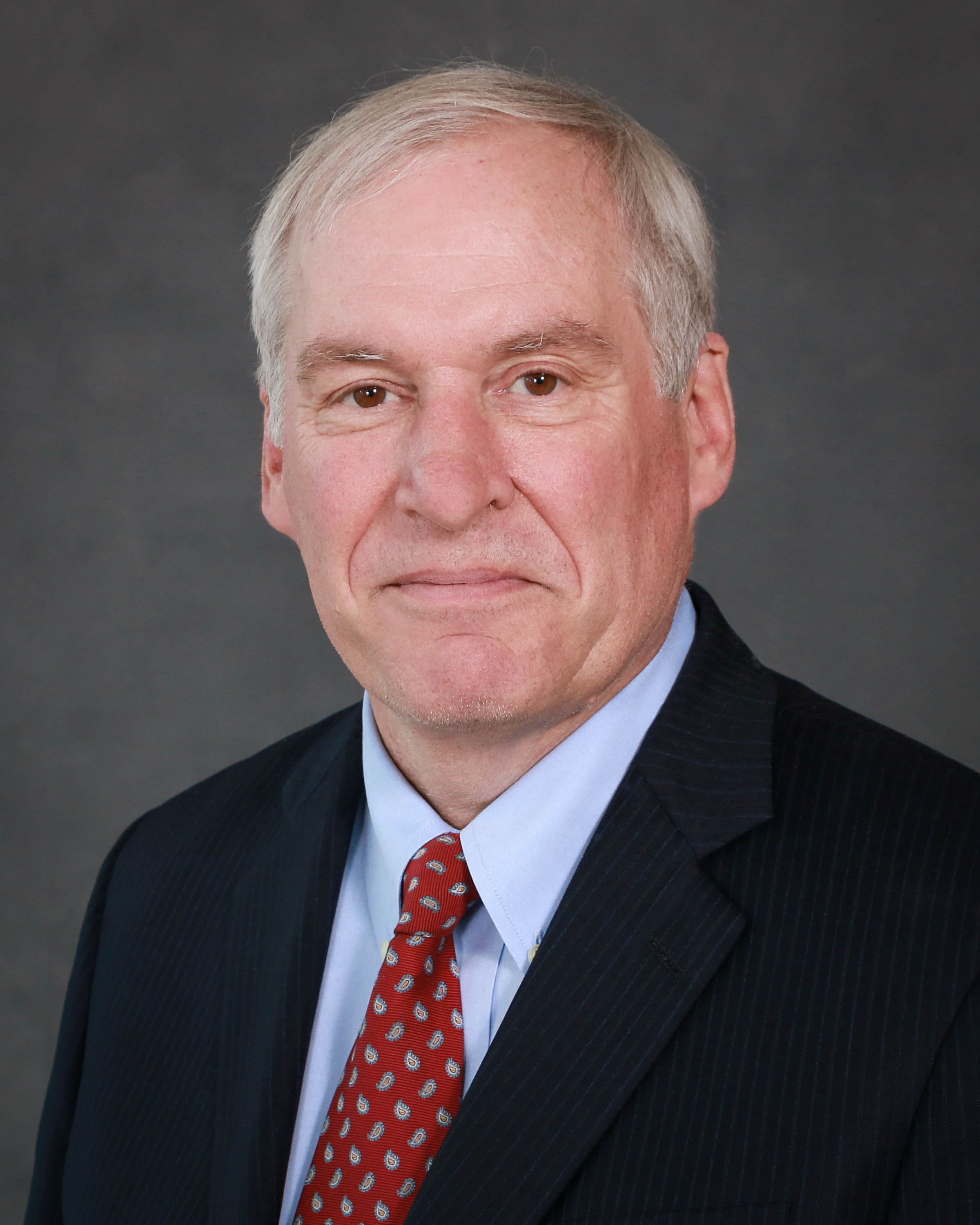

13th President of the Federal Reserve Bank of Boston
- In office July 20, 2007 – September 30, 2021
- Preceded by: Cathy Minehan
- Succeeded by: Susan M. Collins

Personal details
- Born: June 3, 1957 (age 69) Ridgewood, New Jersey, U.S.
- Education: Colby College (BA); University of Wisconsin, Madison (MS, PhD)

Eric S. Rosengren (born June 3, 1957) took office on July 20, 2007, as the thirteenth president and chief executive officer of the Federal Reserve Bank of Boston, serving the First District. As a Fed president, he was a participant and voting member of the Federal Open Market Committee. He retired on September 30, 2021.

== Early life and education ==
Rosengren was born in Ridgewood, New Jersey, the grandson of a Swedish immigrant. He graduated summa cum laude from Colby College with a B.A. and highest honors in economics. He then spent one year in Melbourne, Australia as a Thomas Watson Fellow. Following his year in Australia, he went to the University of Wisconsin, Madison, where he earned an M.S. in economics in 1984 and a Ph.D. in economics in 1986.

== Career ==
Rosengren has held senior positions within the Federal Reserve in both the research and bank supervision functions. He joined the Federal Reserve Bank of Boston in 1985 as an economist in the Research Department. He was promoted to Assistant Vice President in 1989 and to Vice President in 1991 as head of the Banking and Monetary Policy section of the Research Department. In 2000, he was named Senior Vice President and head of the Supervision and Regulation Department. He assumed the additional title of Chief Discount Officer in 2003, and in 2005, he was named Executive Vice President. While in the bank supervision function, he obtained significant domestic and international regulatory experience related to the Basel II Capital Accord.

In his work as an economist, Rosengren has made the link between financial problems and the real economy a focus of his research, and he has published extensively on macroeconomics, international banking, bank supervision, and risk management. He has been an author on over 100 articles and papers on economics and finance, including articles top economics and finance journals.

As President and CEO of the Federal Reserve, Rosengren supported a number of efforts to expand the Boston Fed's outreach and impact on low- and moderate-income communities - including hosting foreclosure-prevention workshops for New England residents during the Great Recession, and running a competition for postindustrial New England communities to develop cross-sector collaboration and ultimately help improve the lives of lower-income residents.

Rosengren also supported the Main Street Lending Program, which loaned to small and medium-sized businesses during the pandemic, as well as the Money Market Mutual Fund Liquidity Facility, which provided loans to money market funds over the first thee months of the pandemic.

Rosengren is a visiting professor at the MIT Golub Center for Finance and Policy where he is involved in the Institute's central bank digital currency research collaboration with the Boston Fed.

Rosengren is also on the Board of Directors for the Berkshire Hills Bankcorp, on the Board of Trustees of Colby College, and the CEO of Rosengren Consulting.

In October 2020, Rosengren helped organize and participated in a “Racism and the Economy” series in collaboration with the presidents of the Minneapolis and Atlanta Reserve Banks.

In 2020, Rosengren directly traded sizeable amounts of four REITs, including Annaly Capital Management Inc., a REIT that holds mortgage-backed securities. During the time that he made these trades, the Fed had begun buying $40 billion of this type of debt per month, a fact that Rosengren, as a Federal Open Market Committee participant in 2020, would have had non-publicly available knowledge of; he had also advocated specific Fed policies that would have a bearing on the value of these assets. Rosengren was criticized for these activities, which involved trades of tens and hundreds of thousands of dollars, and which critics claimed undermined confidence in the activities of the Federal Reserve. After the revelations concerning these trades by Rosengren and millions of dollars' worth of trades by Robert Kaplan, his colleague at the Federal Reserve, Sen. Elizabeth Warren called on all Federal Reserve presidents to be banned from trading and owning individual stocks. In response, Rosengren said he would sell his individual stocks.

On September 27, 2021, Rosengren announced his retirement beginning on September 30, citing a deteriorating kidney condition. The announcement comes after the Federal Reserve began a review of how it oversees the investments of officers. Rosengren was due to retire in June 2022 when he reached the mandatory retirement age of 65.

On January 22, 2024, the Federal Reserve inspector general concluded a probe that cleared Rosengren of trades in 2020, concluding that the trades were allowed under the Fed’s rules and there was no violation of central bank policies or the law.

Other offices
Preceded by Cathy Minehan	President of the Federal Reserve Bank of Boston; 2007–2021	Succeeded by Susan M. Collins
