= Federal Reserve Bank of Boston =

Member Bank of Federal Reserve

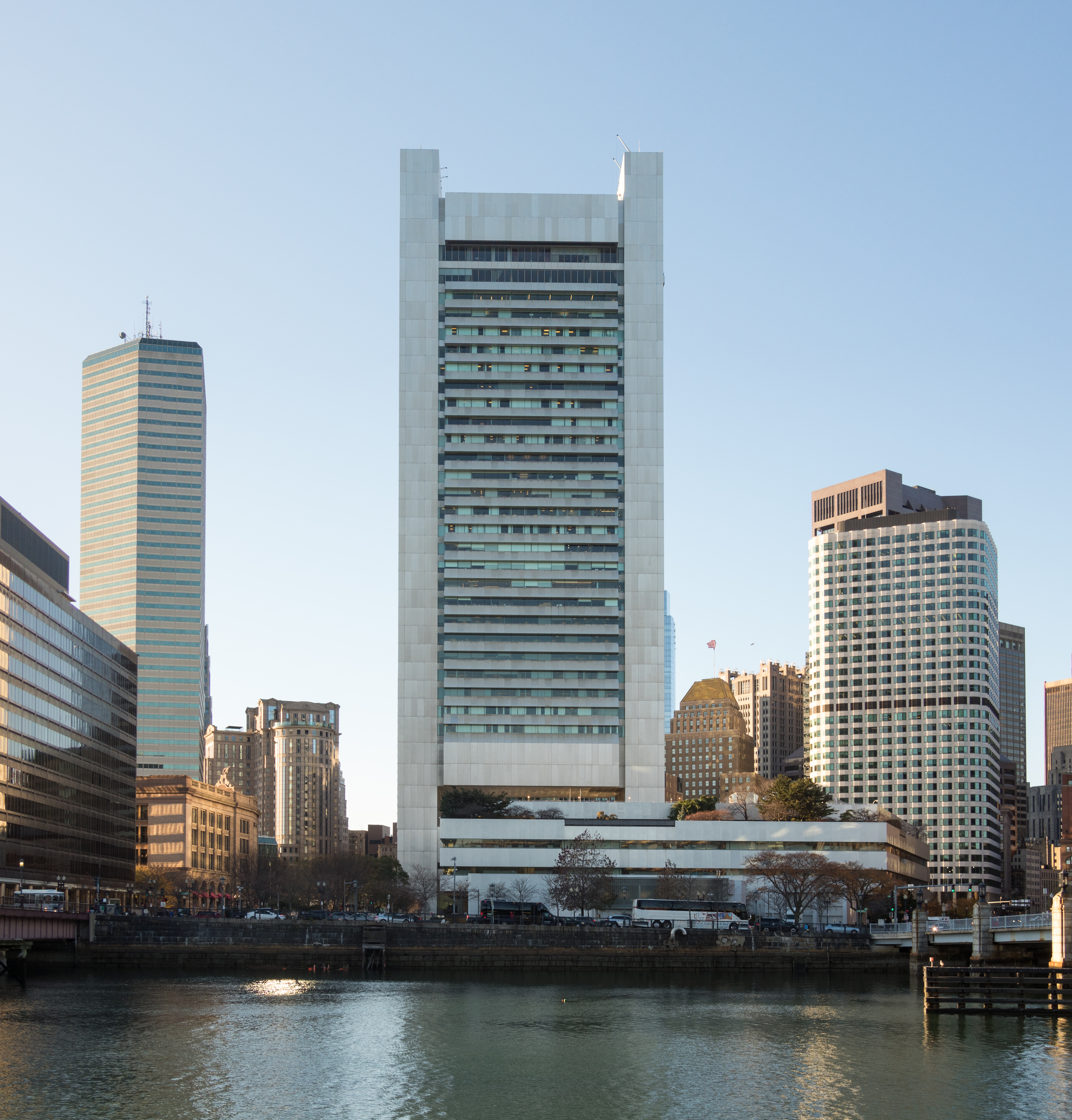
- The Federal Reserve Bank of Boston in 2019
- Central bank of: First District: Massachusetts; Maine; New Hampshire; Rhode Island; Vermont; Parts of: Connecticut
- Headquarters: Federal Reserve Bank Building; 600 Atlantic Avenue; Boston, Massachusetts, U.S.
- Established: May 18, 1914 (112 years ago)
- President: Susan Collins
- Website: bostonfed.org
- The Federal Reserve Bank of Boston is one of twelve regional banks that make up the Federal Reserve System

The Federal Reserve Bank of Boston, commonly known as the Boston Fed, is one of the twelve Federal Reserve Banks of the United States. It is responsible for the First District of the Federal Reserve System, which encompasses New England: Maine, Massachusetts, New Hampshire, Rhode Island, Vermont and all of Connecticut except Fairfield County. The district is headquartered in Boston. Current Federal Reserve Bank of Boston president is Susan Collins, who is the first Black woman and the first woman of color to lead any of the 12 regional Federal bank branches.

The code of the Bank is A1, meaning that dollar bills from this Bank will have the letter A on them. The Boston Fed describes its mission as promoting "growth and financial stability in New England and the nation". The Boston Fed also includes the New England Public Policy Center. It has been headquartered since 1977 in the distinctive 614-foot (187 m) tall, 32-story Federal Reserve Bank Building at 600 Atlantic Avenue. Designed by architecture firm Hugh Stubbins & Associates, the tower portion of the building is suspended between two towers on either side. From 1922 to 1977, the bank's headquarters were located at 250 Franklin Street, currently occupied by the Langham Hotel Boston. This building was designated a Boston Landmark by the Boston Landmarks Commission in 1978.

== Board of directors ==
The following people serve on the board of directors as of October 2025. Terms expire on December 31 of their final year on the board.

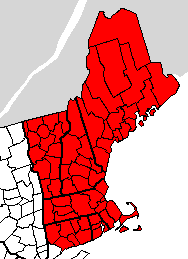
Map of the First District

=== Class A ===
Class A
Name	Title	Term Expires
Ronald O'Hanley	Chairman and Chief Executive Officer; State Street Corporation; Boston, Massachusetts	2025
Josephine Moran	President and Chief Executive Officer; Ledyard Financial Group, Inc. Hanover, New Hampshire	2026
Sushil Tuli	Chairman and Chief Executive Officer; Leader Bank; Arlington, Massachusetts	2027

=== Class B ===
Class B
Name	Title	Term Expires
Betty Francisco	Chief Executive Officer; Boston Impact Initiative; Boston, Massachusetts	2027
Kimberly Sherman Stamler	President; Related Beal; Boston, Massachusetts	2026

=== Class C ===
Class C
Name	Title	Term Expires
Roger W. Crandall (Chair)	Chairman, President, and Chief Executive Officer; MassMutual Financial Group; Springfield, Massachusetts	2026
Lizanne Kindler (Vice Chair)	Executive Chair and Chief Executive Officer; KnitWell Group; Hingham, Massachusetts	2025
Corey E. Thomas	Chairman and Chief Executive Officer; Rapid7, LLC; Boston, Massachusetts	2027

== Governors and presidents ==
The position was installed under the title of "Governor" until the Banking Act of 1935 abolished the dual role of governor and agent and created a single leadership role – president.

#	CEO	Life span	Term start	Term end	Tenure length
Governors
1	Alfred L. Aiken	1870–1946	November 25, 1914	December 20, 1917	3 years, 25 days
2	Charles A. Morss	1857–1927	December 20, 1917	December 31, 1922	5 years, 11 days
3	William P. G. Harding*	1864–1930	January 16, 1923	April 6, 1930	7 years, 80 days
4	Roy A. Young	1882–1960	September 1, 1930	—	—
Presidents
4	Roy A. Young	1882–1960	—	March 31, 1942	11 years, 211 days
5	William W. Paddock	1879–1957	April 1, 1942	May 1, 1944	2 years, 30 days
6	Ralph Flanders	1880–1970	May 1, 1944	February 28, 1946	1 year, 303 days
7	Laurence F. Whittemore	1894–1960	March 3, 1946	October 4, 1948	2 years, 215 days
8	Joseph A. Erickson	1896–1983	December 15, 1948	February 28, 1961	12 years, 75 days
9	George H. Ellis	1920–2005	March 1, 1961	June 30, 1968	7 years, 121 days
10	Frank E. Morris†	1923-2000	August 15, 1968	December 31, 1988	20 years, 138 days
11	Richard F. Syron	1943–	January 1, 1989	March 31, 1994	5 years, 89 days
12	Cathy Minehan	1947–	July 13, 1994	July 20, 2007	13 years, 7 days
13	Eric S. Rosengren	1962–	July 20, 2007	September 30, 2021	14 years, 72 days
–	Kenneth Montgomery; Acting		September 30, 2021	July 1, 2022	274 days
14	Susan Collins		July 1, 2022	present	4 years, 67 days

†	Stepped down due to reaching retirement age
*	Died in office

== Image gallery ==
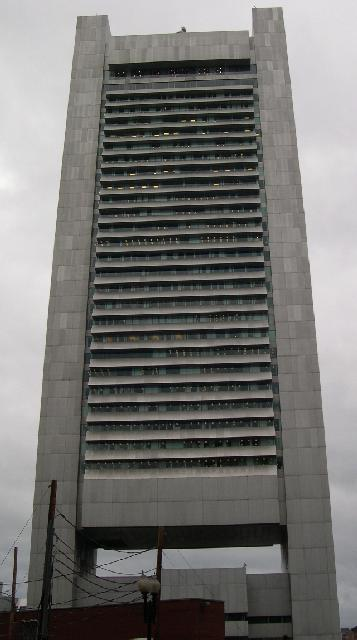
On an overcast day

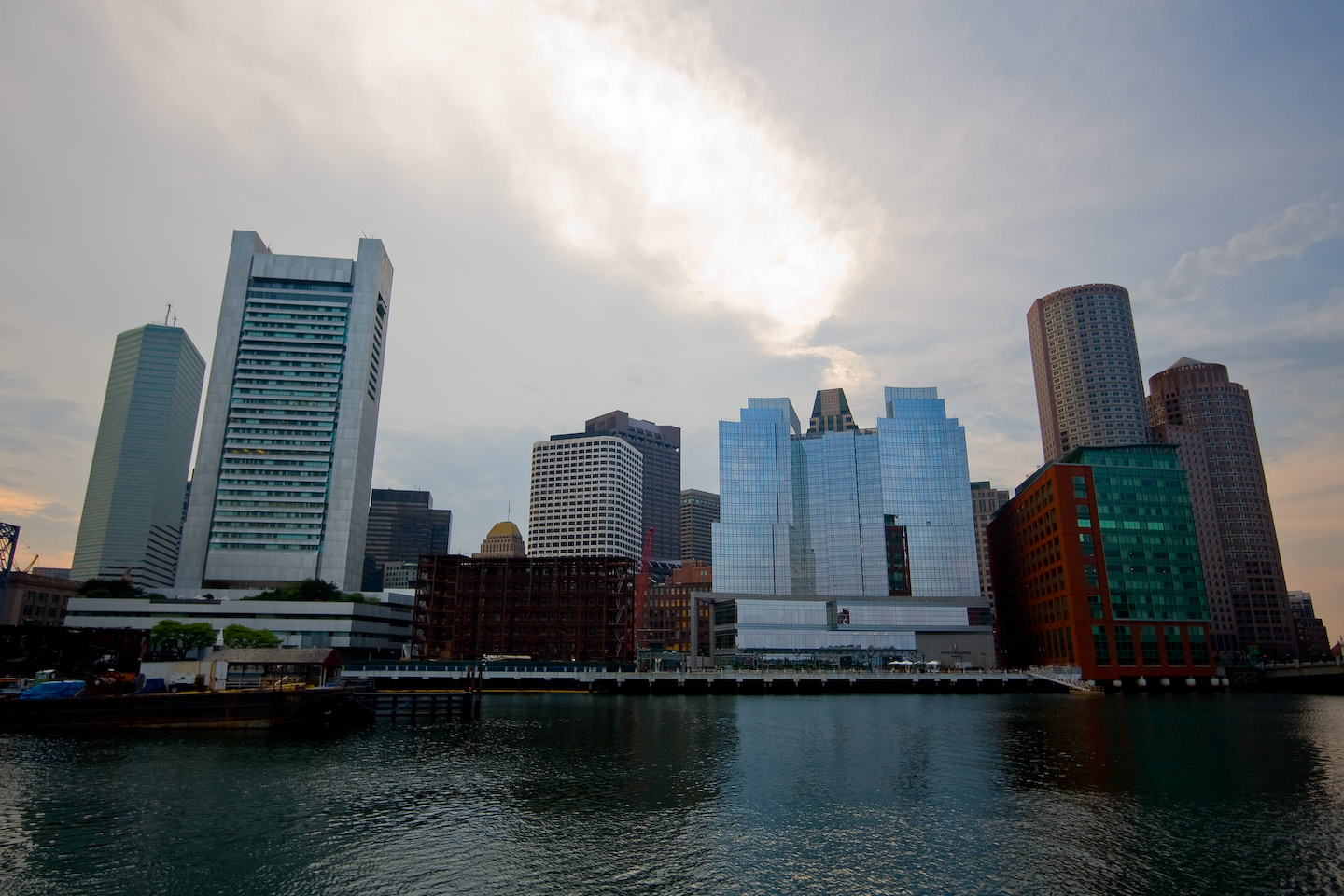
The Federal Reserve Bank's position to the rest of the Financial District of Boston

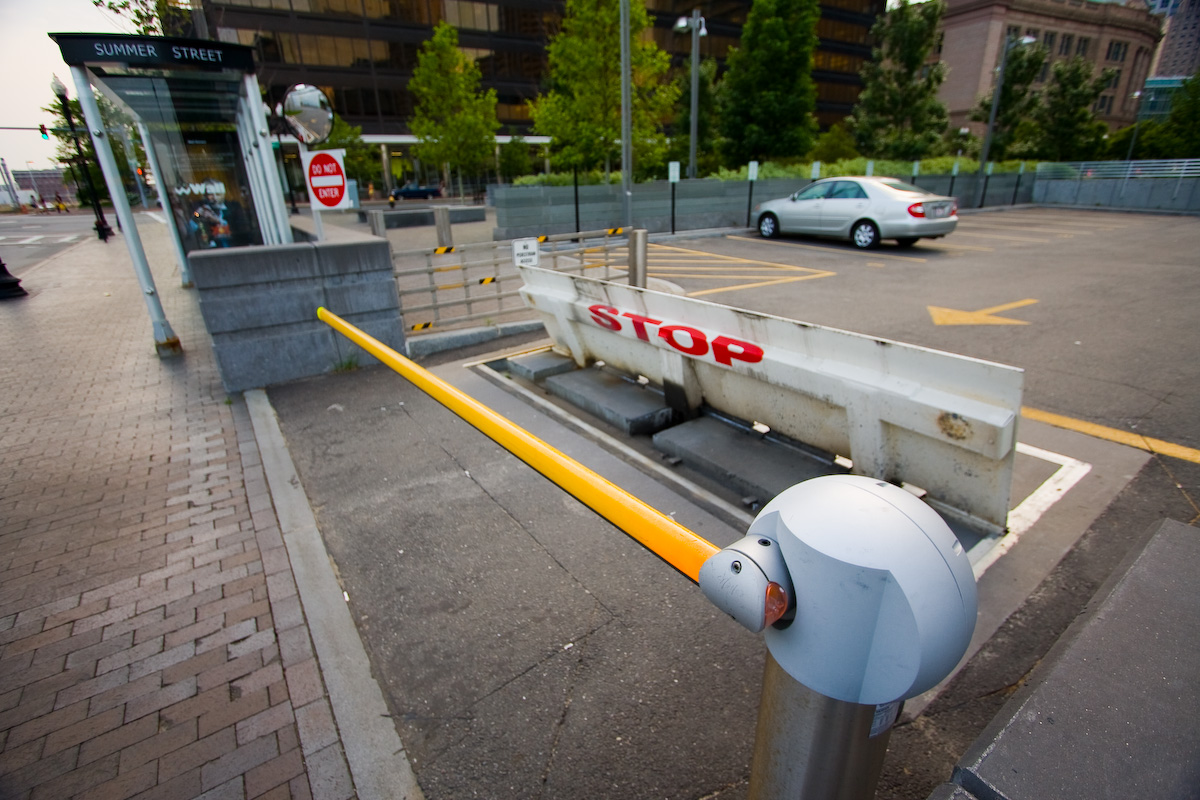
The parking lot security methods installed for the Federal Reserve Bank of Boston

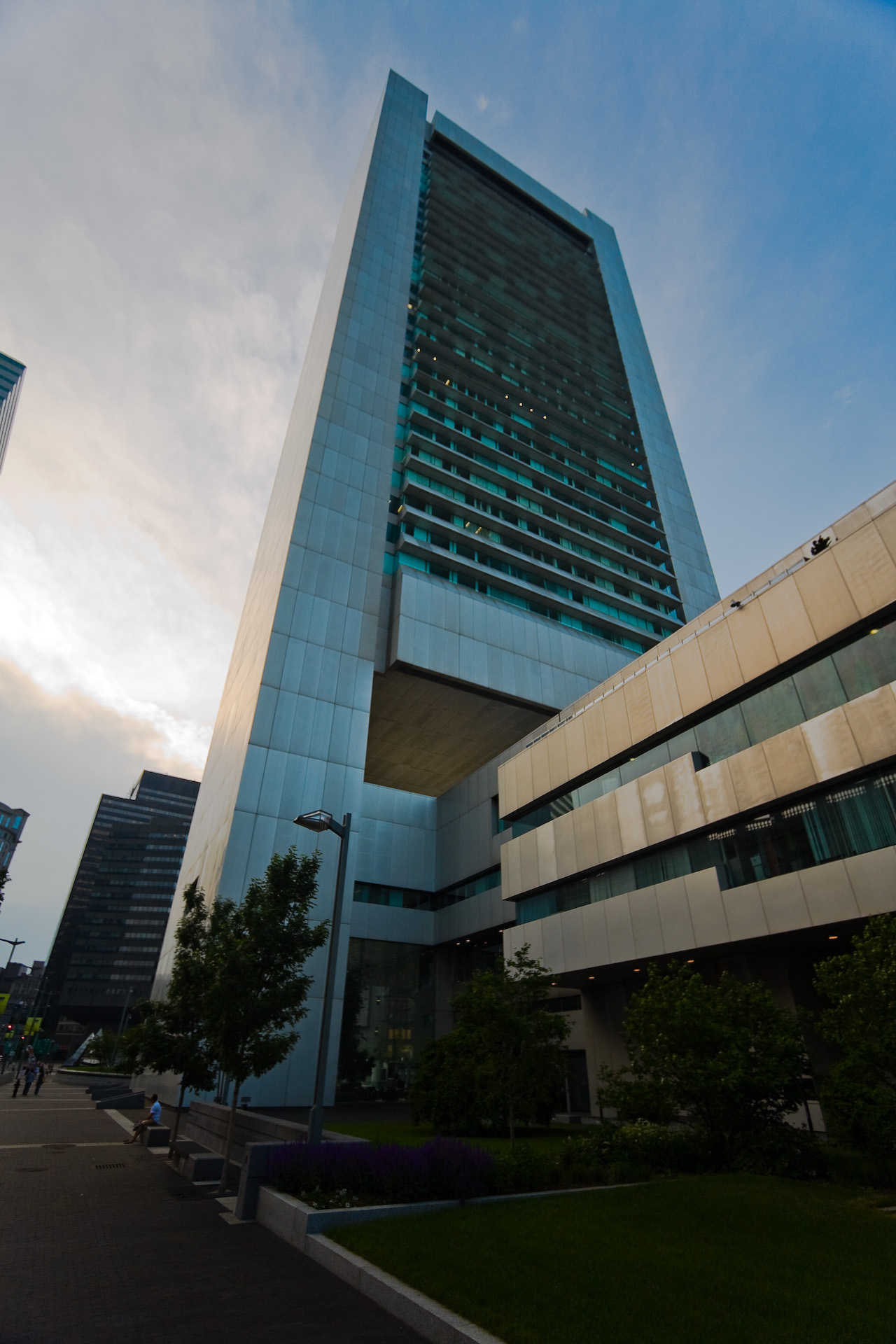
The Federal Reserve Bank of Boston building viewed from the back

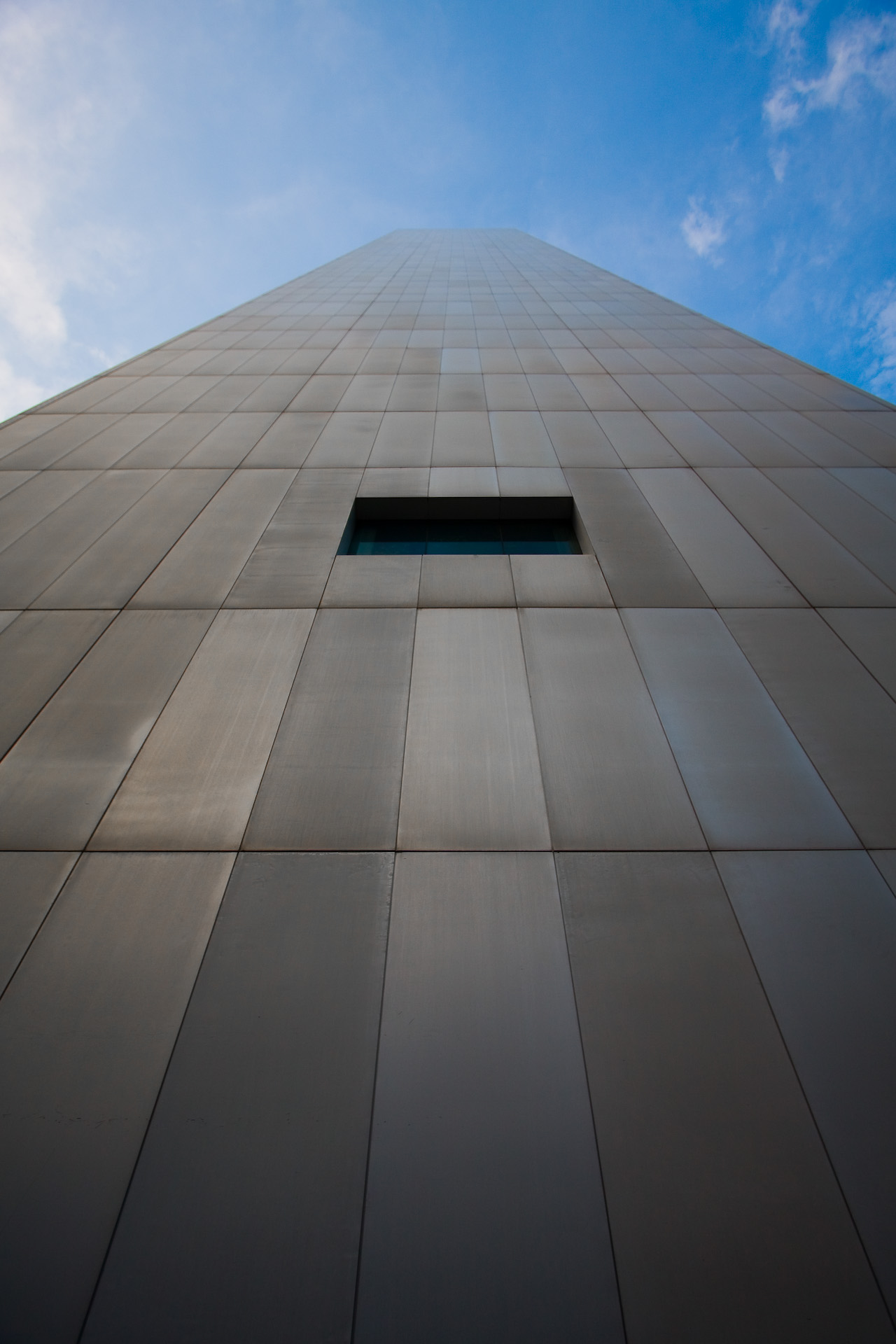
The Federal Reserve Bank of Boston viewed from the side at street level. The entire building is covered with a matte aluminum paneling

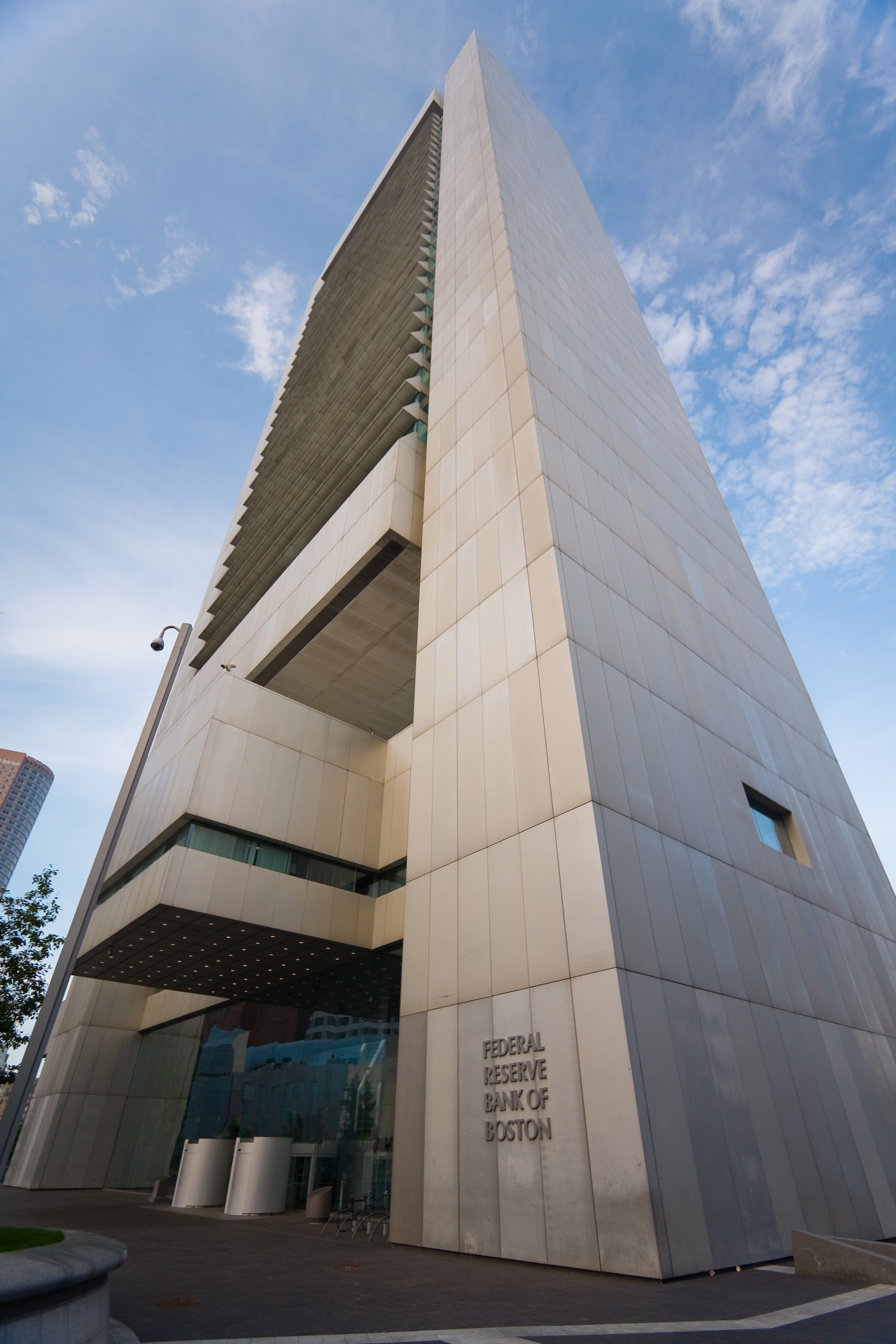
The Federal Reserve Bank of Boston building front entrance

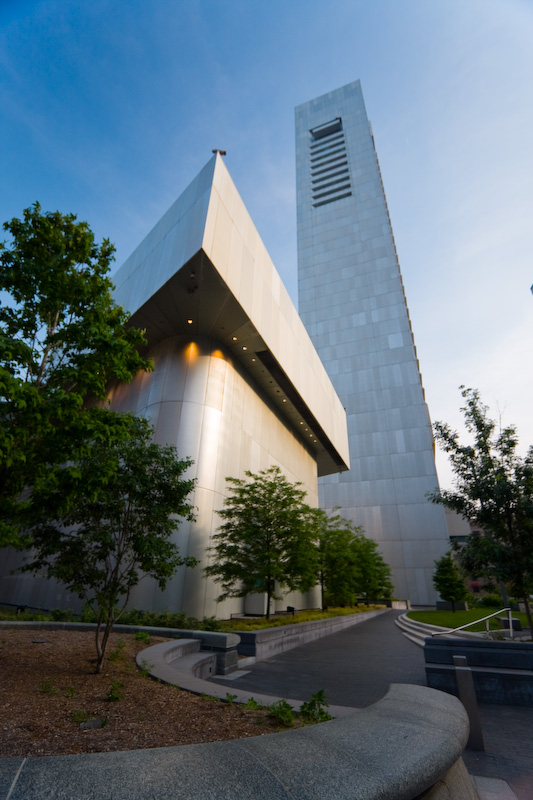
The Federal Reserve Building of Boston viewed from the side

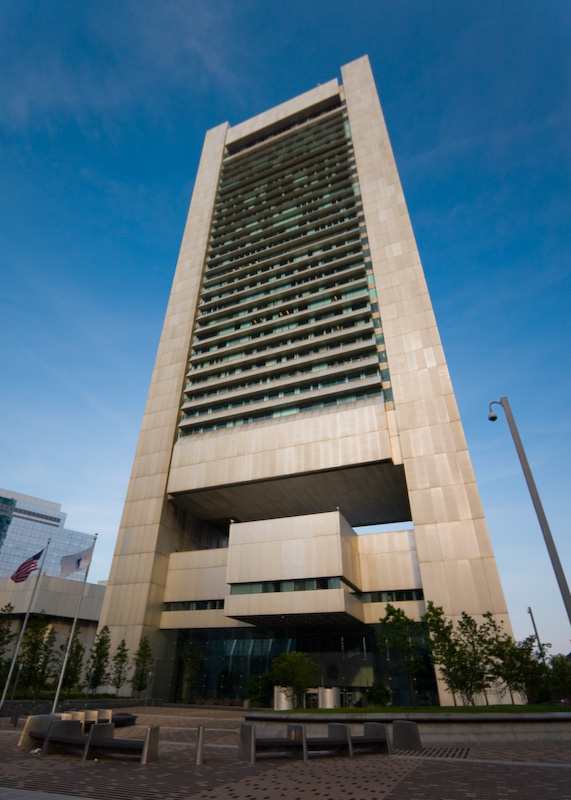
The Federal Reserve Bank of Boston tower near the South Boston financial district

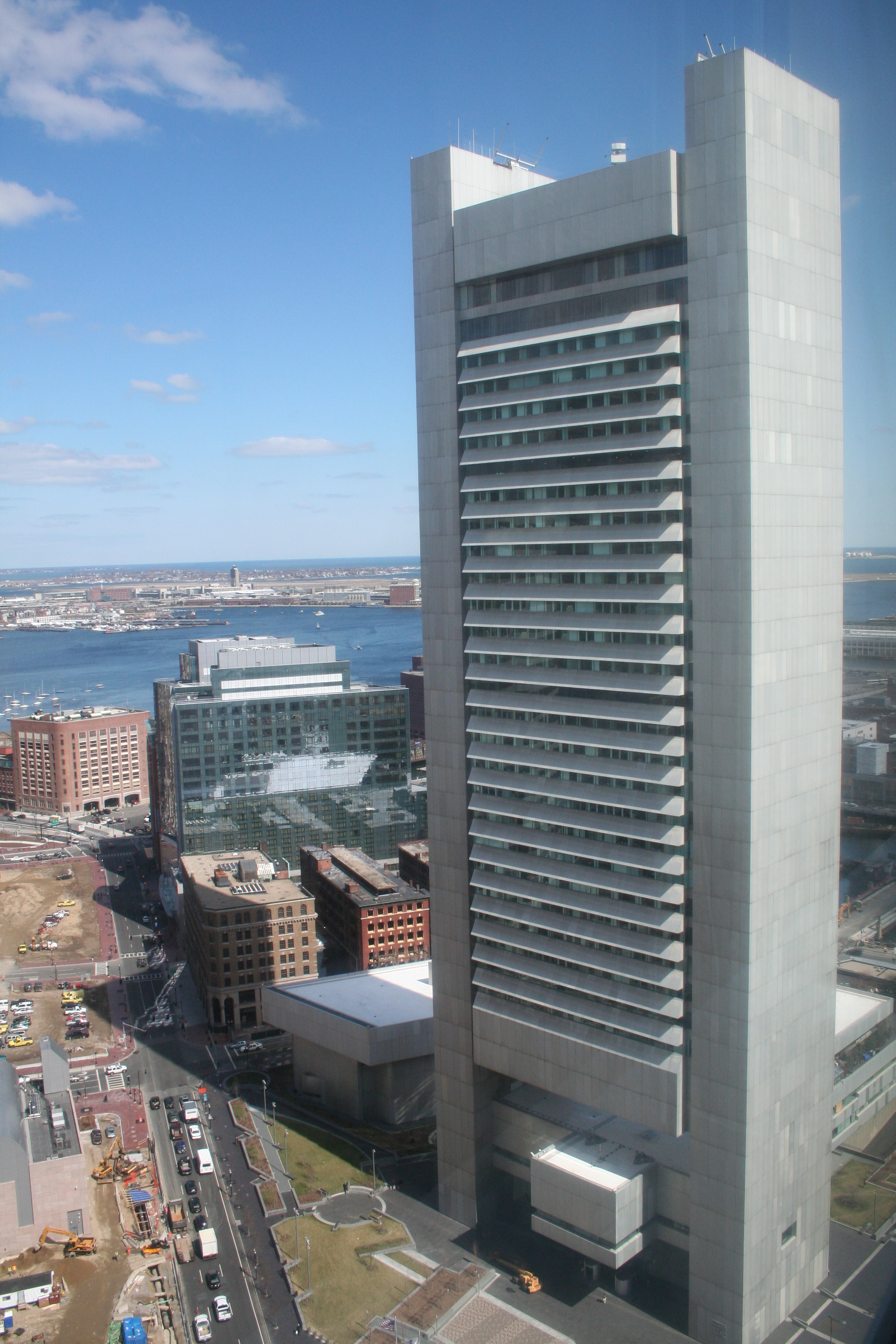
The Federal Reserve Bank Building in Downtown Boston

== See also ==
- Federal Reserve System
- Federal Reserve Districts
- Federal Reserve Branches
- Federal Reserve Act
- Federal Reserve Bank Building (Boston)
- Structure of the Federal Reserve System
