= Laurence F. Whittemore =

American executive (1894–1960)

- Born: June 8, 1894; Pembroke, New Hampshire, U.S.
- Died: August 10, 1960 (aged 66); Concord, New Hampshire, U.S.
- Occupation: Businessman
- Known for: President of the Federal Reserve Bank of Boston, New York, New Haven and Hartford Railroad, and Brown Company
- Political party: Democratic
- Spouse: Evelyn Fulford (1923–1959; her death)
- Children: 3

Laurence Frederick Whittemore (June 8, 1894 – August 10, 1960) was an American business executive who served as president of the Federal Reserve Bank of Boston from 1946 to 1948, president of the New York, New Haven and Hartford Railroad from 1948 to 1949, and president of the Brown Company from 1950 to 1955.

== Early life ==
Whittemore was born on June 8, 1894, in Pembroke, New Hampshire, to Frederick Brewster Whittemore and Candice (Norton) Whittemore. Whittemore's parents died when he was seven years old and he grew up on an uncle's farm. Whittemore was Pembroke's town moderator for 25 years and represented the town in the New Hampshire State Legislature from 1925 to 1927.

Whittemore graduated from the Pembroke Academy in 1912. Although he never graduated from college, Whittemore received honorary degrees from Dartmouth College, the University of New Hampshire, New England College, Lowell Textile Institute, and Suffolk University and was a trustee of the University of New Hampshire, Boston University, Kimball Union Academy, and Pembroke Academy. He was also on a Rhodes Scholarship selection committee.

== Business career ==
Whittemore began his railroad career in 1913 as a clerk in the Boston and Maine Railroad's Concord, New Hampshire car shop. He left the railroad in 1917 to join the United States Army. He rose to the rank of lieutenant and returned to the B&M after his discharge in 1919. However, after a couple of months he left the railroad to become a municipal accountant for the New Hampshire Tax Commission. In 1922, he became the general manager of Fellows & Sons Lumber Co. In this role, Whittemore supervised the company's mills, log drives, and industrial plants. From 1925 to 1929, he was a member of the New Hampshire Tax Commission.

In 1929, Whittemore returned to the Boston and Maine as a general representative. In May 1932, he was made an assistant to B&M president Edward S. French. Four months later he took on a similar role with the Maine Central Railroad as well. Whittemore headed up public relations and industrial development for both railroads and was an officer of several B&M subsidiaries, including the Boston Garden-Arena Corporation, Mount Washington Cog Railway, and Mystic Terminal Company. He helped organize Boston-Maine Airways and served as its vice president until federal regulations barred railroads from the aviation business.

In 1944, Whittemore was elected a Class B director of the Federal Reserve Bank of Boston. In 1946, he succeeded Ralph Flanders as president of the bank. On August 31, 1948, Whittemore was elected president of the New York, New Haven and Hartford Railroad. He resigned from the Federal Reserve Bank of Boston on October 4, 1948. He resigned a president of the New Haven on December 21, 1949, in order join the Brown Company. He took over as Brown's president on January 1, 1950, and on October 20, 1952, took on the additional role as chairman of the board of directors. Under Whittemore's leadership, the papermaker began producing a number of new products, including chloroform and shoe inserts.

In 1952, he was elected president of the New England Council, a regional business association. In 1955, he served as a special advisor and observer for President Dwight D. Eisenhower at the Geneva Round of the General Agreement on Tariffs and Trade multilateral trade negotiations.

Whittemore was also a director of Amoskeag Company, New England Telephone and Telegraph Company, National Life Insurance Co., Peerless Insurance, H. P. Hood and Sons, State Street Bank and Trust Company, and Boston and Albany Railroad. He was also a trustee of the Brookings Institution and New Hampshire Historical Society and chairman of the Crotched Mountain Rehabilitation Center.

== Later life ==
Whittemore stepped down as president of Brown Company in 1955, but remained chairman until ill health forced his resignation in 1960. A short time later, the University of New Hampshire announced the establishment of the Whittemore School of Business and Economics. Whittemore died on August 10, 1960, at Concord Hospital.

Other offices
Preceded by Ralph Flanders	President of the Federal Reserve Bank of Boston; 1946–1948	Succeeded by Joseph A. Erickson
Business positions
Preceded by Frederic C. Dumaine Sr.	President of the New York, New Haven and Hartford Railroad; 1948–1949	Succeeded by Frederic C. Dumaine Sr.
Preceded by Frederic G. Coburn	President of Brown Company; 1950–1955	Succeeded by A. E. Harold Fair
