= Federal Reserve Bank Building (Boston) =

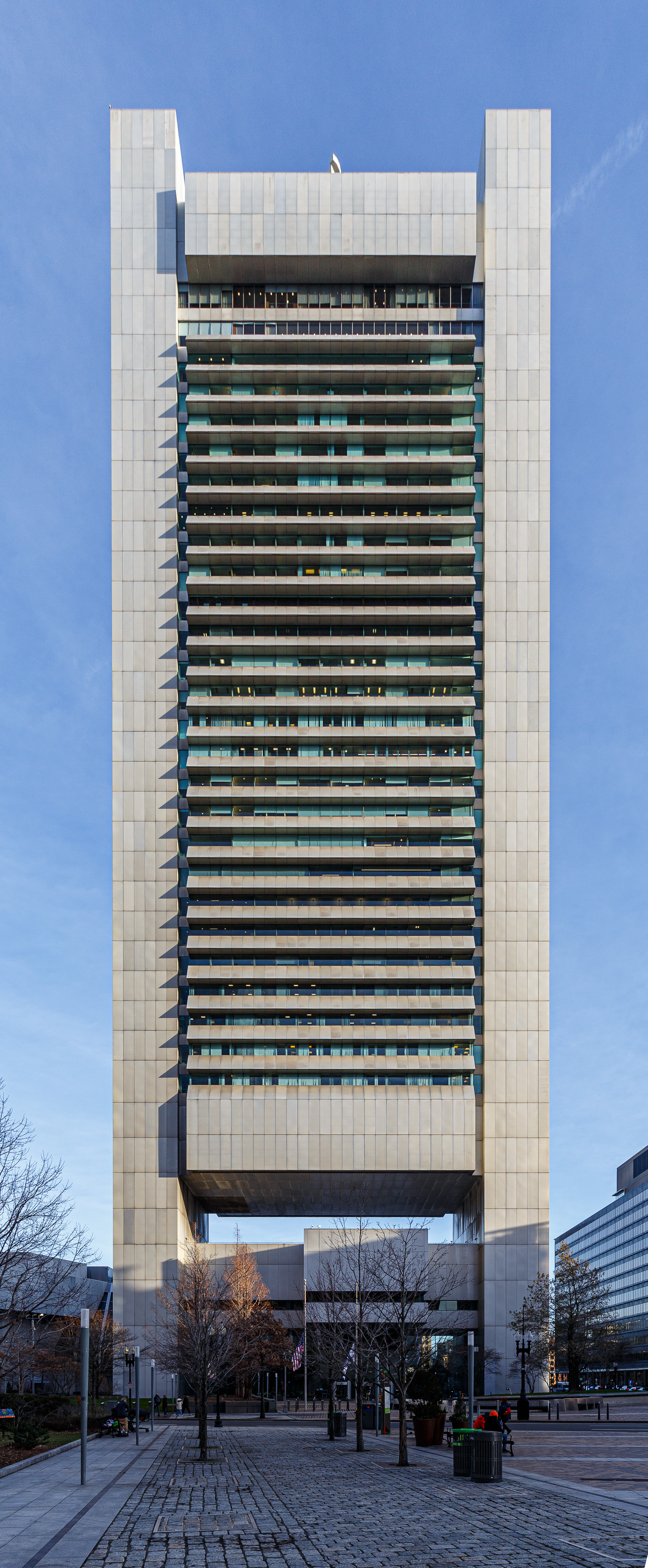
- Interactive map of the Federal Reserve Bank Building area

General information
- Status: Completed
- Type: Office building
- Architectural style: Modernism
- Location: 600 Atlantic Avenue, Boston, Massachusetts, United States
- Coordinates: 42°21′10″N 71°03′15″W
- Construction started: 1969
- Completed: 1977

Height
- Roof: 614 ft (187 m)

Technical details
- Floor count: 32

Design and construction
- Architect: Stubbins and Associates
- Developer: The Federal Reserve Board
- Structural engineer: LeMessurier Consultants

The Federal Reserve Bank Building is the seventh-tallest building in Boston, Massachusetts. It is located at Dewey Square, on the convergence of Fort Point and the Financial District neighborhoods. In close proximity to the Boston Harbor, the Fort Point Channel and major intermodal South Station terminal, the building is marked by a distinctive opening near ground level which allows sea breezes to pass through.

== History ==
The building under construction in 1974

Built for the Federal Reserve Bank of Boston to replace the 1922 building which now houses the Langham Hotel Boston, the building was completed in 1977 and is 614 feet (187 m) tall with 32 floors. It was designed by Hugh Stubbins of The Stubbins Associates, Inc. and was reportedly one of his favorite buildings. The design stood in contrast to that of the other Reserve Banks, which resembled fortresses. It sometimes referred to as "the washboard" building or "Venetian Blind" building

== Design and features ==
The building consists of an office tower and a four-story wing, built between December 1972 and November 1974. The office tower has a glass front and an anodized aluminum exterior, with office floors that rise from a 140-foot bridge and a 600-ton steel truss.

It features an auditorium that is named for Frank E. Morris, the President and Chief Executive Officer of the Federal Reserve Bank of Boston from 1968 to 1988. It was designed to meet the Bank's needs and is also available to the community, offering lunchtime concerts as well.

Gardens are incorporated above street level.

== List of tenants ==
- Aspen Specialty Insurance Co.
- Cavan Group, The
- ConnectEDU
- Federal Reserve Bank of Boston
- Italy (Consul General) - 17th Floor
- Craig & Macauley P.C.
- Harvard Management Company
- Kforce
- Krokidas & Bluestein LLP
- Middleton & Company, Inc.
- Peabody & Arnold LLP
- Wolf, Greenfield P.C.
- 600 Atlantic Federal Credit Union
- Partners Capital

== Awards ==
- 2010 — United States Green Building Council (USGBC), prestigious "LEED-EB Gold designation." "LEED for Existing Buildings: Operations & Maintenance" is a rating system that recognizes buildings with superior operational efficiency and minimal environmental impact.
- 2009 — The Building Owners and Managers Association (BOMA) of Boston, "The Office Building of the Year" (TOBY).
- 2008, 2010–2018 — U.S. Environmental Protection Agency (EPA), "ENERGY STAR Award."
- 1979 — The American Institute of Architects New England Regional Council, "AIA Award for Excellence in Architecture."

== Gallery ==
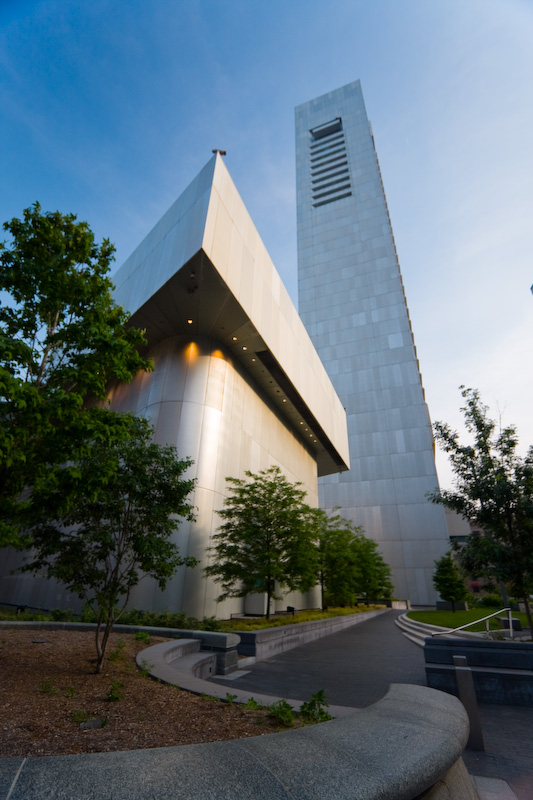
One of the small courtyards to the side of the building.

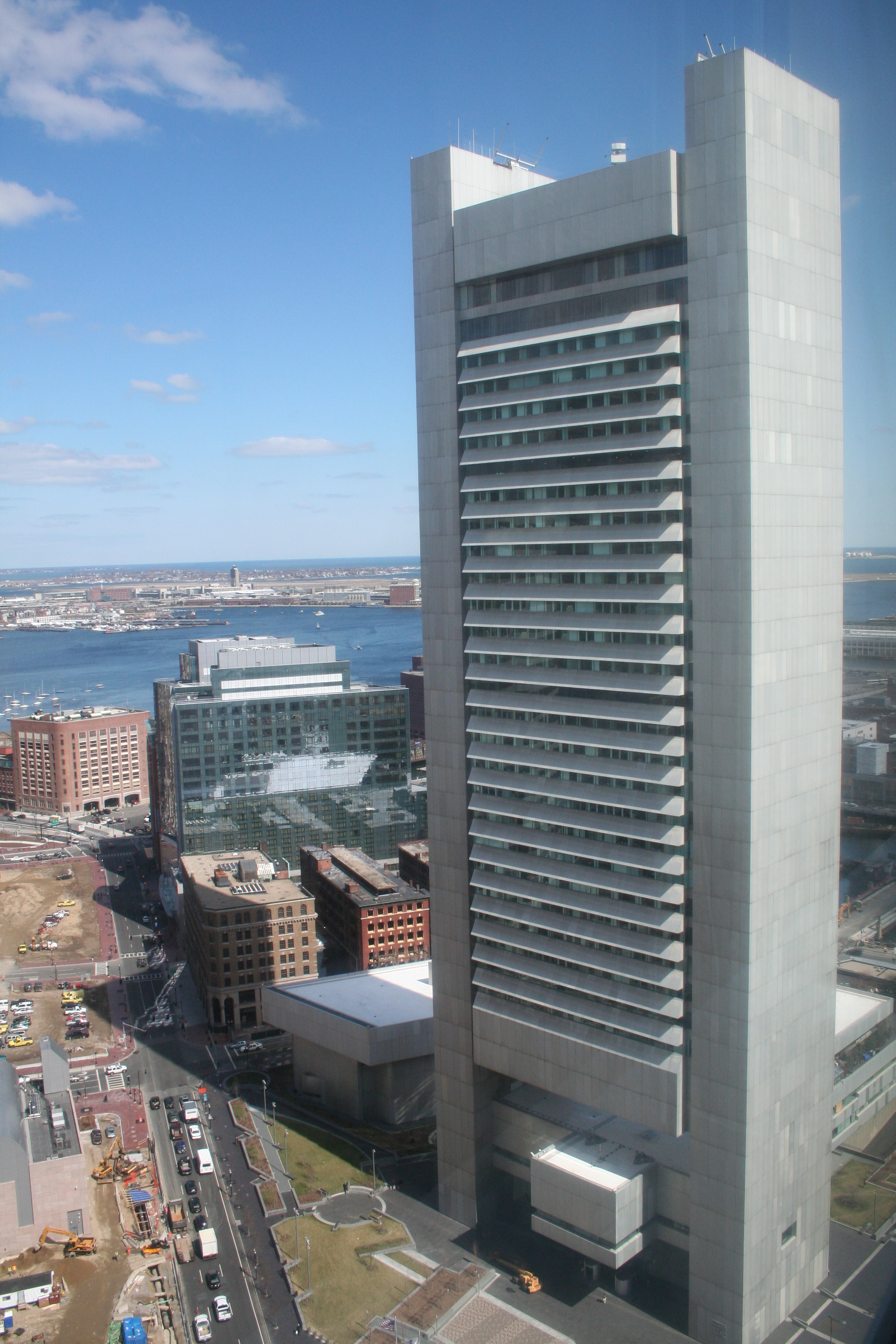
Drone view

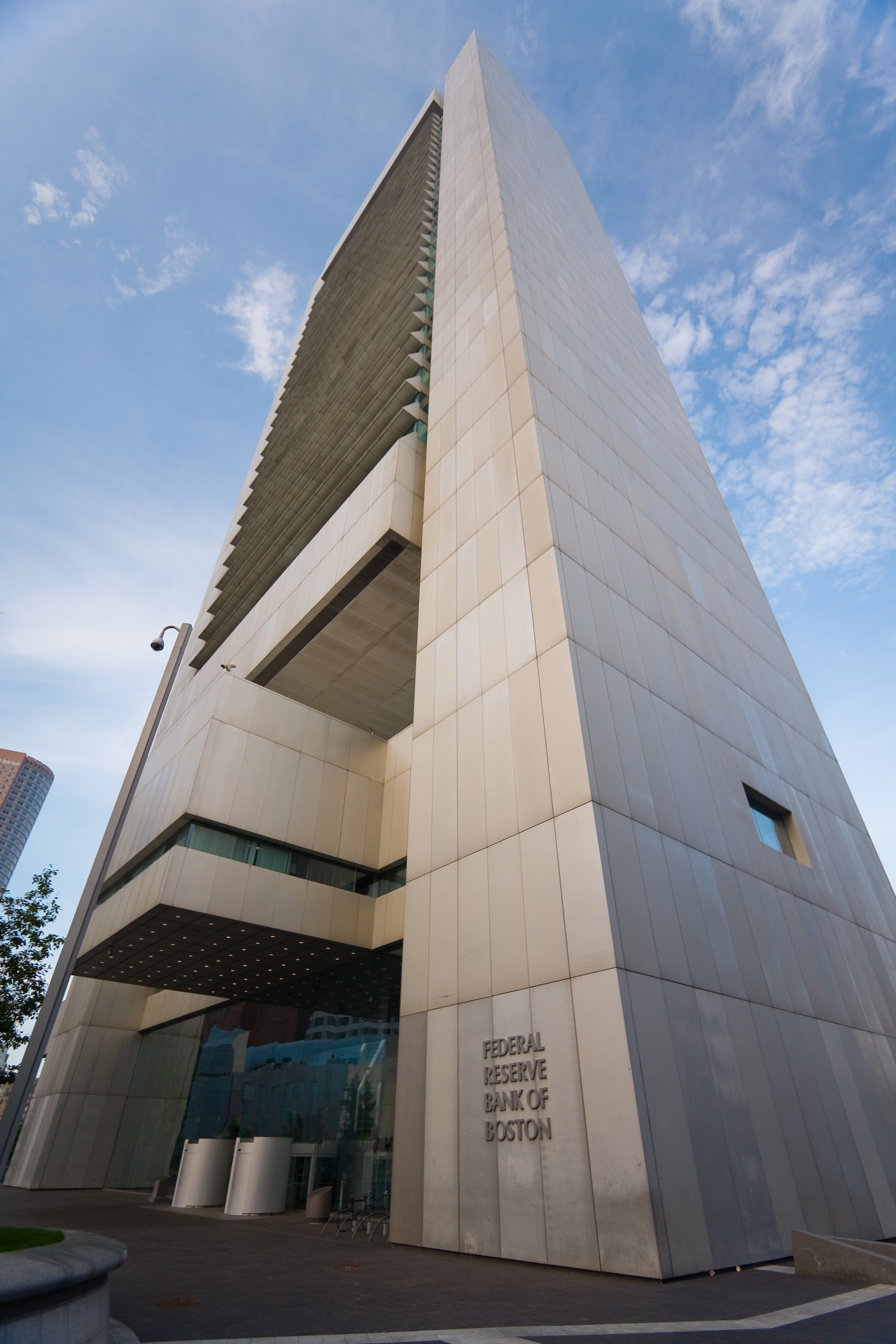
The building entrance.

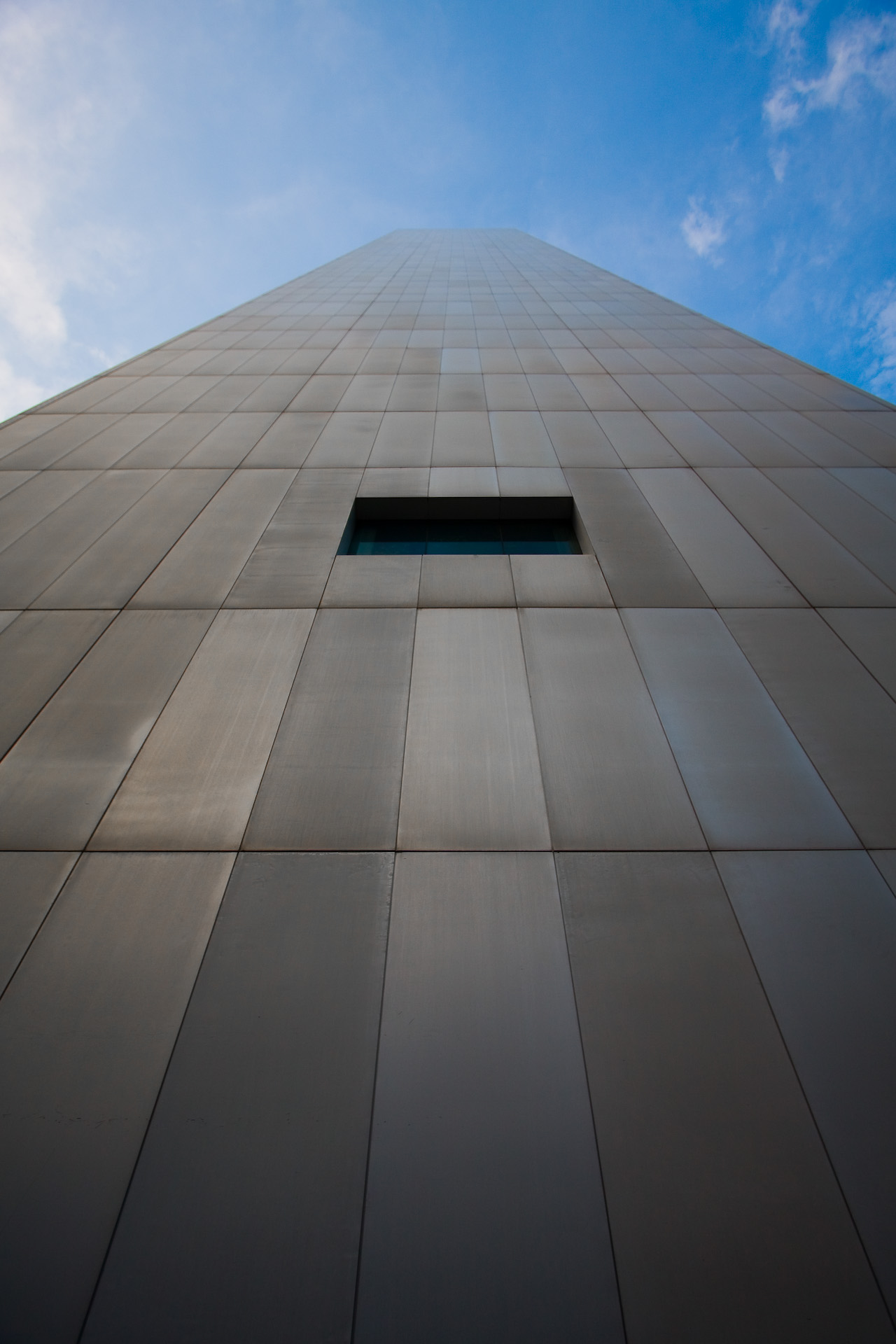
Detail of the side, looking up.

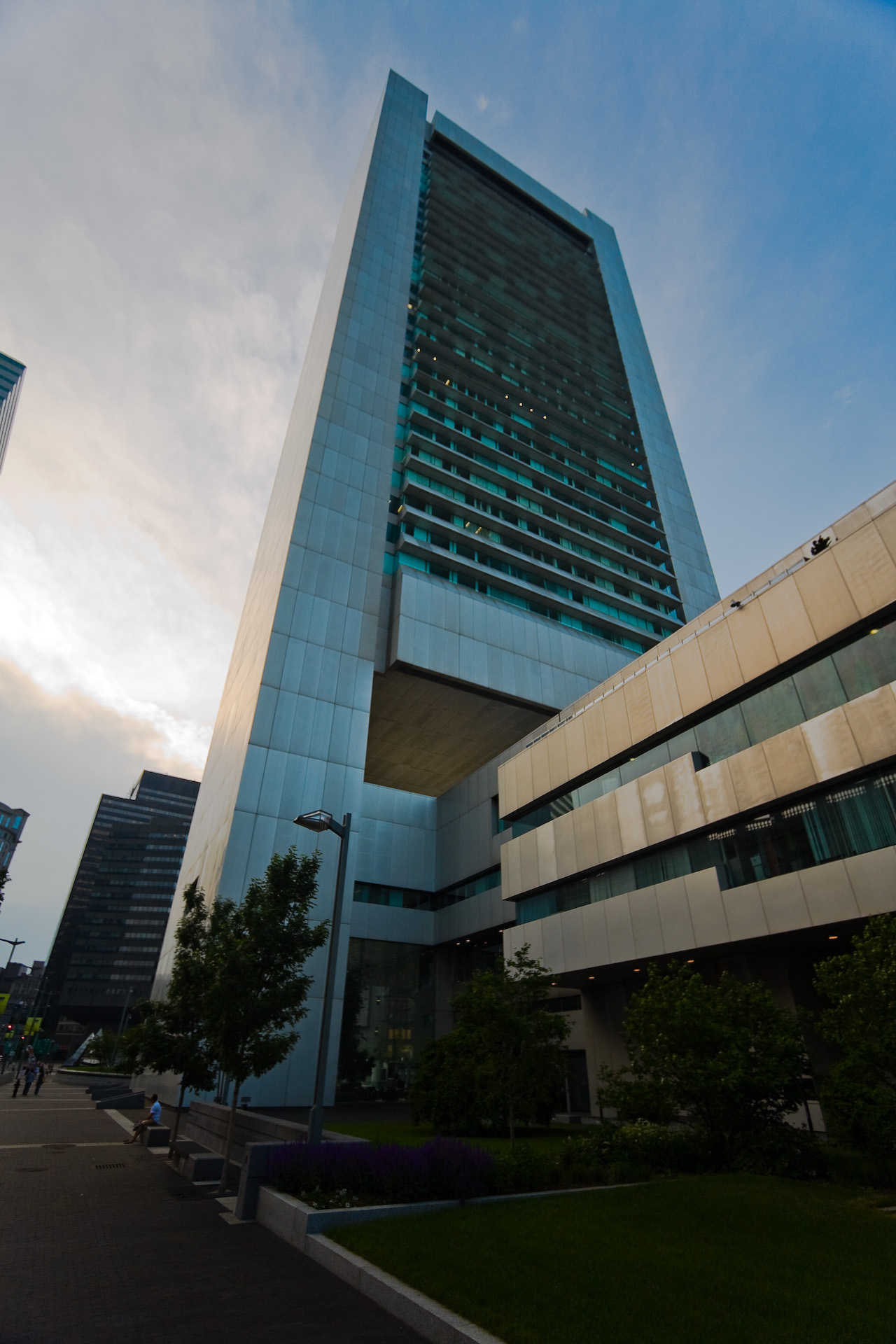
Viewed from the back.

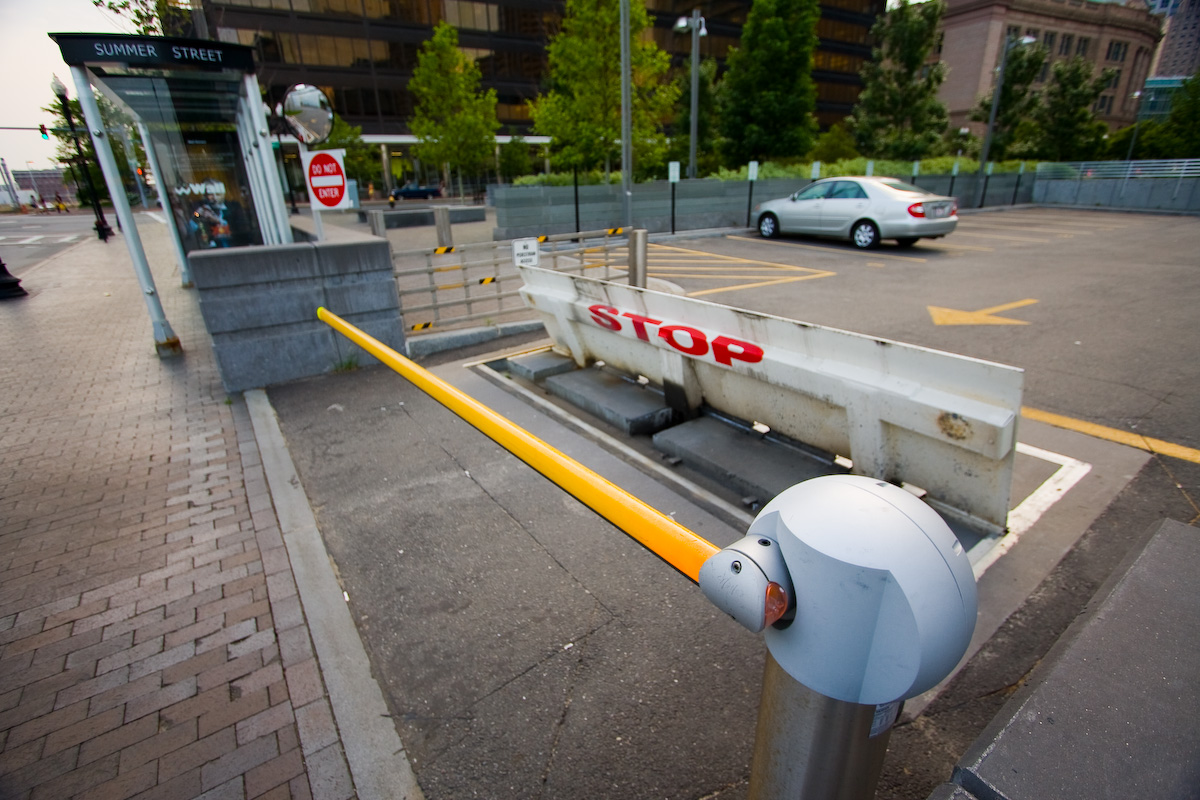
Parking lot security measures.

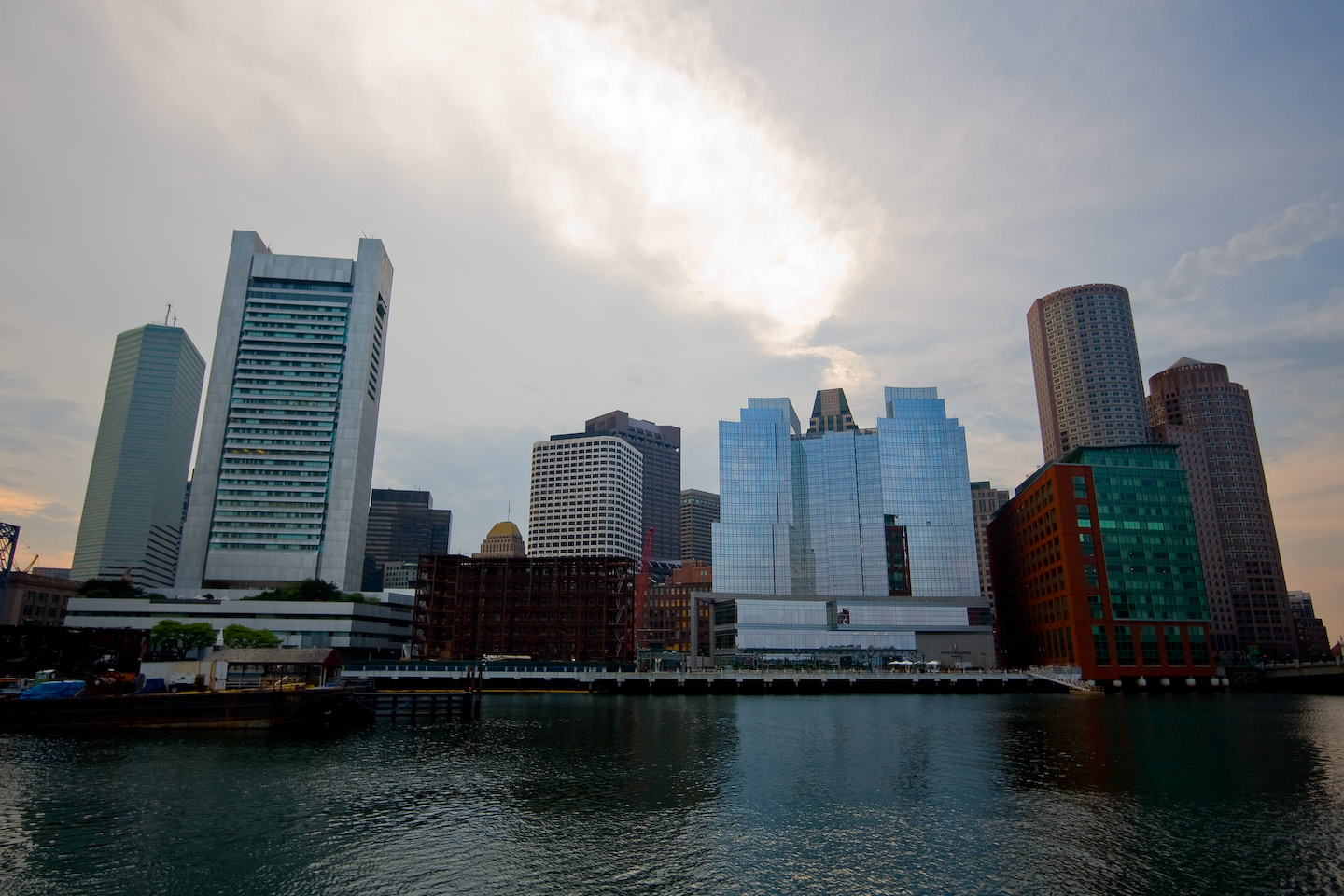
Position in the Financial District skyline.

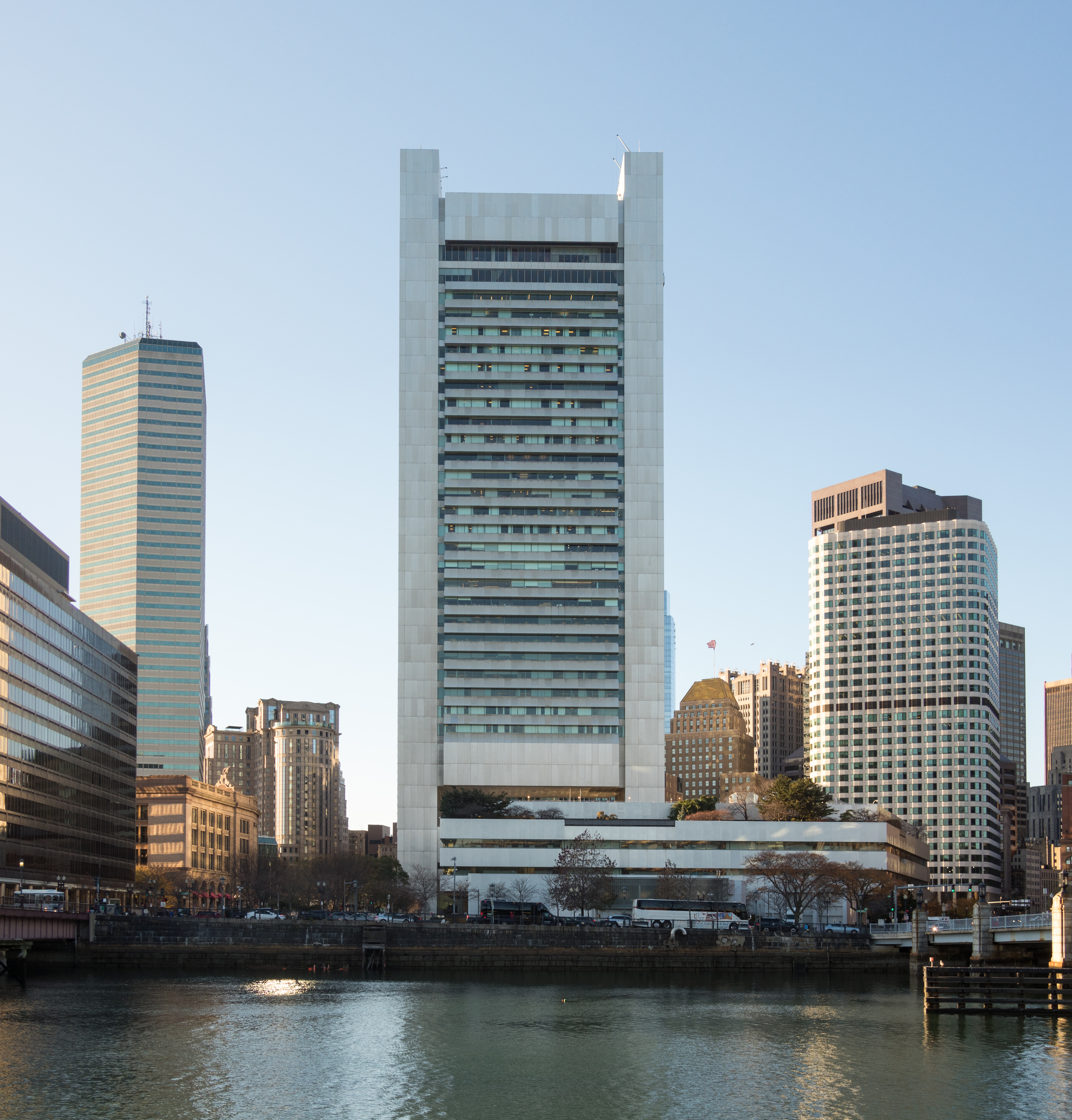

== In popular culture ==
In the 2006 Martin Scorsese film The Departed, in the scene where Colin Sullivan (Matt Damon) gets caught on the roof by undercover cop Billy Costigan (Leonardo DiCaprio), the building can be seen in the background.

In 2020, the building appeared in the background of a scene in the second episode of Star Trek: Picard as Picard and Laris beam into Dahj's apartment.

== See also ==
- Federal Reserve Bank of Boston
- List of tallest buildings in Boston
