= John Hailer =

American financial services executive (born 1960)

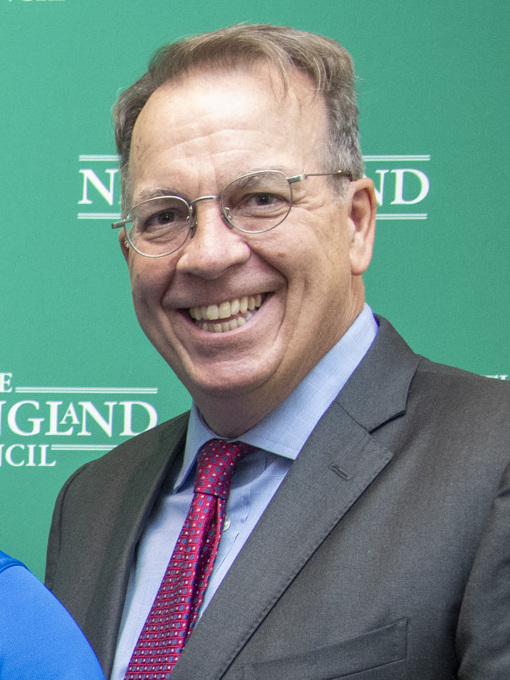
- Hailer in 2018
- Born: 1960 (age 65–66)
- Education: Beloit College
- Occupations: President, 1251 Asset Management; Chairman, F/m Managers Group

John Thomas Hailer (born 1960) is an American financial services executive. He is the Chairman of F/m Managers Group and President of 1251 Asset Management of 1251 Capital Group.

Before joining 1251 Capital, Hailer was president and chief executive officer of Natixis Global Asset Management, now Natixis Investment Managers, a subsidiary of French bank Natixis.

== Career ==
Hailer received a Bachelor of Arts degree in history and government in 1983 from Beloit College.

Hailer began his career at Fidelity Investments in 1986, selling corporate cash products, retirement plans and pension fund management services. From there he joined Putnam Investments where he served as senior vice president and director of retail business development. In 1994 Hailer returned to Fidelity. He served as senior vice president of international business development for the Americas and senior vice president of strategic marketing with the Fidelity Investments Institutional Services Company, with responsibility for new business development in North America and Latin America and directing product and marketing development for institutional channels. He also helped the firm launch its first series of closed-end mutual funds.

He joined what was then known as IXIS Asset Management Advisors Group in 1999, and was named chief executive officer. He was appointed chief executive officer of Natixis Global Associates in 2006 following the merger of the asset management and investment banking operations of Natexis Banques Populaires (Banque Populaire group) and IXIS (Groupe Caisse d'Epargne). In 2007 Hailer was named president and chief executive officer of Natixis Global Asset Management (NGAM) – The Americas & Asia. He was responsible for NGAM's distribution strategies worldwide and oversaw the business activities of the firm's asset management affiliates in the United States and Asia. Under Hailer, NGAM added over 500 people in Boston over the past decade. The firm had more than $890 billion in assets under management and employed 1,400 people in Boston as of December 31, 2014.

Hailer has appeared in the media and at conferences, speaking on issues such as the economy, regulatory reform, corporate taxation, investments, future trends in retirement, and other issues on outlets such as CNBC, Fox Business News, Bloomberg TV and NECN. He also speaks at the state and federal level on economic issues, including job creation and growth, globalization, infrastructure spending, regional economic cooperation, and regional economic development. Hailer has been an advocate for the homeless population in the Boston area, speaking to the Boston Globe in 2014 regarding the importance of supporting organizations that work with the homeless.

=== Board positions ===
Hailer has a record of civic leadership in the Boston area, notably as Chairman of the New England Council, a regional business and community interest organization, and as co-chairman of the Boston Financial Services Leadership Council. He also serves on the board of trustees at Berklee College of Music, the board of trustees at Beloit College and is a member of the board of directors of Boston Medical Centre. He is a former chair of the board of directors of The Home for Little Wanderers, the oldest continuously operated children's charity in the United States.

== Philanthropy ==
Under Hailer's leadership, Natixis expanded its corporate philanthropy program, establishing relationships with social service non-profits, such as Pine Street Inn, Strong Women Strong Girls, Elizabeth Stone House, Community Work Services, Ellis Memorial and Eldredge House, St. Francis House, United Way of Massachusetts Bay and Merrimack Valley, Best Buddies International, Boston Medical Centre, and The Home for Little Wanderers.

Hailer is also responsible for creating an Adopt-A-School Program in partnership with the City of Boston and the John Winthrop Elementary School in Dorchester. The program has provided the school with upgraded technology, school supply drives, winter holiday gift drives, and a mentoring program that partners children with Natixis employees and funding for other school programs.

=== Newport Jazz Festival ===
Natixis and Hailer were the 2014 Presenting Sponsors of the Newport Jazz Festival and the 2014 Berklee College Summer Music Series. At the 2018 Newport Jazz Festival, 45 students were gifted full scholarships provided by The Newport Festivals Foundation and the Joyce and George Wein Foundation, with additional support came from the Mary Hailer Scholarship Fund (established by John and Maureen Hailer).

== Awards and recognition ==
Hailer has been recognized numerous times for his charity work. In 2010, Hailer was honored by St. Francis House with its All the Way Home Award. In 2012, Hailer was named a recipient of the Massachusetts Women's Political Caucus Good Guys Award for his work on behalf of victims of domestic violence and his efforts to promote the hiring of women in the financial services industry. In 2013, the Irish International Immigrant Centre presented its Solas Award to Hailer in recognition of his leadership in promoting philanthropy and volunteerism, and for his advocacy for Comprehensive Immigration Reform. Also in 2013, Hailer was recognized by The Home for Little Wanderers, having helped to raise more than $23 million, build a new campus for the foundation in Walpole, and open additional facilities in Plymouth and Roxbury. In 2014, Hailer was named the most admired CEO by the Boston Business Journal.

Under Hailer, Natixis was recognized as having the most generous employees for the past three years by the Boston Business Journal, and in 2014 Natixis was named among the top charitable corporations by the Boston Business Journal, placing 33rd out of 73 firms. The Boston Globe also named Natixis among the best places to work in Boston in 2014 for the seventh consecutive year.

== Personal life ==
In 2013, Hailer married his wife, Maureen. Hailer’s father, Fred Hailer, was a city council member and state representative of Massachusetts.
