= Laurie McCauley =

American dentistry scientist and academic administrator

17th Provost of the University of Michigan
- Incumbent
- Assumed office May 6, 2022
- Preceded by: Susan Collins

Personal details
- Education: Ohio State University (BS, DDS, MS, PhD)
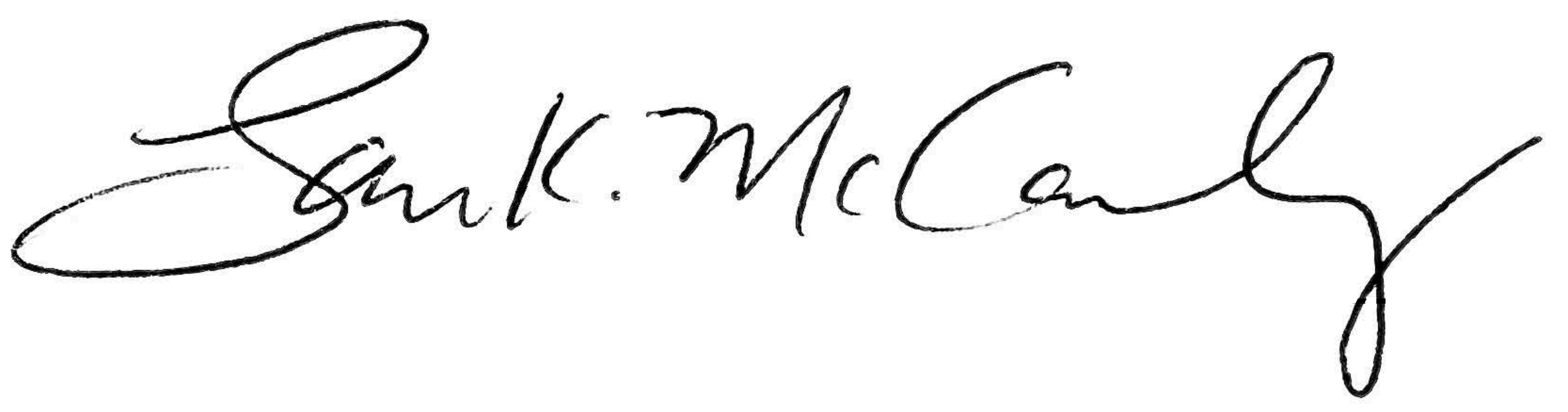
- Signature
- Scientific career
- Fields: Veterinary pathology
- Thesis: Cellular mechanisms of lymphocyte-mediated bone resorption (1991)
- Doctoral advisor: Charles Capen; Thomas Rosol

Laurie Kay McCauley is an American dentist and medical scholar, currently serving as the 17th provost and executive vice president for academic affairs of the University of Michigan since May 2022.

Prior to her current role, she served as the William K. and Mary Anne Najjar Professor and dean of the University of Michigan School of Dentistry, as well as professor at the Department of Pathology of the University of Michigan Medicine.

== Education ==
McCauley received a Bachelor of Science with a major in education in 1980, a Doctor of Dental Surgery in 1985, a Master of Science in dentistry in 1988, and a Doctor of Philosophy in veterinary pathobiology in 1991, all from Ohio State University.

== Career ==
As provost and executive vice president for academic affairs, McCauley oversees the University of Michigan’s academic and budgetary affairs. The deans of the university's 19 schools and colleges report to her, as do the vice provosts with portfolios covering academic and budgetary affairs; academic and faculty affairs; academic affairs-graduate studies; academic innovation; engaged learning; sustainability and climate action; undergraduate education; arts and humanities; access and opportunity; and enrollment management. In partnership with the other executive vice presidents, McCauley leads campus planning initiatives as well as the university’s strategic visioning process.

During her tenure as provost, McCauley has created and overseen a number of campus-wide programs and initiatives. In 2023, she charged the Initiative Planning Group on Student Academic Success, prompting the creation of a vice provost for undergraduate education position to lead student success efforts. She also hired an inaugural vice provost for sustainability and climate action, responsible for elevating and coordinating the university’s wider strategic approach to sustainability education and research.

McCauley has also focused on health and well-being through support of various disability and accommodations programs. The University of Michigan joined the JED Campus initiative in 2023 to promote student mental health, supplementing integrated programming and collaborative care teams created through interprofessional education.

In 2024, she commissioned a study which found parity in salaries for men and women faculty members. That same year, her office conducted research and developed resources to address faculty concerns with threats and harassment based on their academic work.

In 2025, McCauley's office facilitated the University of Michigan's first-ever Michigan Arts Festival and Climate Week events, each pillars of long-term commitments to environmental justice and creative expression.

Prior to her appointment as provost, she served as University of Michigan School of Dentistry, where she oversaw a $142 million expansion and renovation of the dental school’s clinical and educational facilities. Upon assuming the role as dean, McCauley was elected a member of the National Academy of Medicine. She also continued to conduct research in her laboratory by investigating hormonal control of bone remodeling. Her research was recognized by the American Society for Bone and Mineral Research with their 2019 Stephen M. Krane Award. During the COVID-19 pandemic, McCauley was awarded the American Dental Association’s 2021 Norton M. Ross Award for Excellence in Clinical Research.

McCauley first joined the University of Michigan as an assistant professor of dentistry in 1992. In 2002, she was appointed the William K. and Mary Ann Najjar Professor of Periodontics and became department chair of Periodontics and Oral Medicine. While serving in this role, she was elected a Fellow of the American Association for the Advancement of Science for her "contributions to the field of skeletal physiology, particularly for delineating mechanisms of parathyroid hormone action during bone regeneration and pathophysiology of skeletal metastases." McCauley also edited a textbook on craniofacial mineralized tissues, developed a new graduate program in oral pathology, and a new e-learning dental hygiene degree program.

Beyond the school, she also served in leadership positions with the council of the American Society for Bone and Mineral Research and the National Advisory Dental & Craniofacial Research Council at the National Institutes of Health. As a result of her academic background, she was also chosen to become an associate editor of the Journal of Bone and Mineral Research.

McCauley has held visiting appointments at the Institut de Genetique et de Biologie Moleculaire et Cellulaire, the École Normale Supérieure de Lyon, and the Center for Experimental Therapeutics and Reperfusion Injury at Brigham and Women’s Hospital, a major teaching hospital of Harvard Medical School.
