= Cathy Minehan =

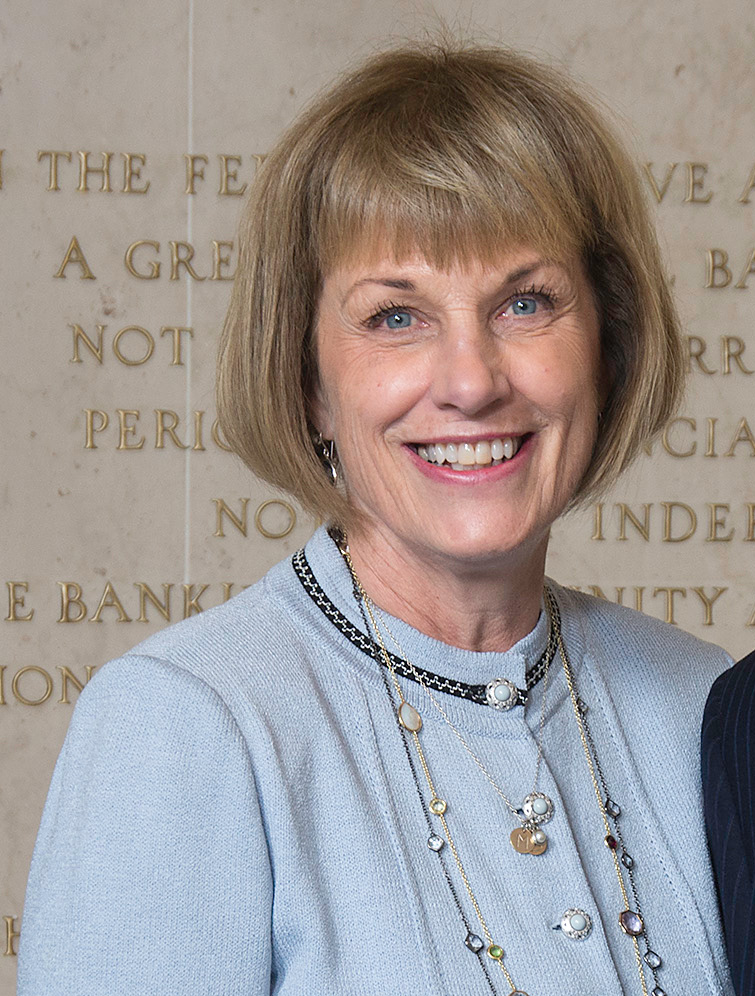

12th President of the Federal Reserve Bank of Boston
- In office July 13, 1994 – July 20, 2007
- Preceded by: Richard F. Syron
- Succeeded by: Eric S. Rosengren

Personal details
- Born: February 15, 1947 (age 79) Jersey City, New Jersey, U.S.
- Education: University of Rochester (BA); New York University (MBA)

Cathy E. Minehan (born February 15, 1947) was president and chief executive officer of the Federal Reserve Bank of Boston from 1994 until her retirement in July 2007. Minehan also served as a member of the Federal Open Market Committee, the body responsible for U.S. monetary policy. She was "appointed Dean of the School of Management of Simmons College, a private university, in August 2011 and is Managing Director of Arlington Advisory Partners, a private advisory services firm."

At the national level over her years of service, she has chaired the Financial Services Policy Committee, a body that oversees the provision of Reserve Bank payment services, and has played key roles in the System's planning for or response to the year 2000 problem, interstate banking legislation, and the September 11 attacks. She also led efforts related to clarifying the governance of shared national activities among Reserve Banks.

== Early life and education ==
Minehan received her undergraduate degree from the University of Rochester and earned her MBA from New York University, where she was designated a Distinguished Alumna in 1995.

== Career ==
=== Federal Reserve System ===
According to Samuel O. Thier, MD, a director on the Federal Reserve Bank of Boston's board, its former chairman, and Professor of Medicine and Health Care Policy at Harvard Medical School

Cathy led the Bank during a challenging period characterized by dramatic changes in world events, the economy and technology.

— Samuel Thier 2007

Minehan was considered by economists to be a more of a monetary dove than a hawk in her economic philosophy.

==== Federal Reserve Bank of New York ====
From 1968 to 1978 Minehan worked as a bank examiner, analyst, and supervisor at the Federal Reserve Bank of New York. She became Assistant Vice President in 1979 and in 1982 she became vice president. She was promoted to Senior Vice President in 1987 and remained in that position until 1991 when she joined the Federal Reserve Bank of Boston.

===== Federal Reserve Bank of Boston =====
From 1991 to 1994 Minehan was the First Vice President of the Federal Reserve Bank of Boston, one of 12 regional Reserve Banks that together with the Board of Governors in Washington D.C. form the Federal Reserve System, which charts "the nation's monetary policy and ensures smooth operation of the banking system." Through the years Minehan "served various roles in Public Information and Accounting Control as well as Check Processing, Accounting, Funds and Securities." In 1991, she was appointed First Vice President and Chief Operating Officer of the Federal Reserve Bank of Boston. She was the first female President and CEO of the Federal Reserve Bank of Boston.

== New England economic development ==
Minehan has placed much focus on the structural economic development within New England, including community development, public education, and training.

== Board member and trustee ==
Minehan is "connected to 63 board members in 6 different organizations across 9 different industries."

Minehan has served on many Boards of Directors including Partners HealthCare, Visa (2007-), Massachusetts General Hospital Trustee, Massachusetts Mutual Life (2009-), Boston Economic Club, She has served on a variety of civic, professional and educational boards, including the School of Social Science Urban Affairs, & Public Policy at Northeastern University, Becton Dickinson (2007-) the Boston Private Industry Council, Massachusetts General Hospital (CEO 2008-), the United Way of Massachusetts Bay and Merrimack Valley, Jobs for Massachusetts, The New England Council, the University of Rochester, and the Carroll School of Management at Boston College.

She was Vice Chairman of the Boston Private Industry Council and the National Council on Economic Education. She was an administrator and trustee of the Universities of Rochester and Bentley College.

Minehan was elected to the board of directors of BD (Becton, Dickinson and Company) (NYSE:BDX) effective 19 November 2007.

Minehan is on the board of the Massachusetts Business Roundtable which "applies the strategic perspective of its members" to assist the Massachusett's elected and appointed leaders in "resolving complex public policy issues in ways that strengthen the state's long-term social and economic prosperity."

In 2011 Minehan served as Dean of the School of Management at Simmons College and is a partner at Arlington Advisory Partners.

== Awards and honors ==
She is the recipient of the 2006 Pinnacle Award for Lifetime Achievement from the Greater Boston Chamber of Commerce, and was named New Englander of the Year in 2002 by the New England Council. Her other recognitions include the New England Women's Leadership award and the International Women's Forum "Women That Make a Difference" award, the Boy Scouts of America's Champion of Character Award, leadership awards from the Patriots' Trail Girl Scouts and the Boston YWCA, awards from the Women's Economic Round Table for her distinguished career in banking, from the Boston Partners in Education for her leadership role in supporting educational partnerships, and the Medal of Hope from the Organization for a New Equality. She is the recipient of numerous honorary degrees.

== Personal life ==
Minehan was married to E. Gerald Corrigan until his death in 2022, a former partner and managing director at Goldman Sachs Group, Inc. From 2008 to 2016, he was chairman of Goldman Sachs Bank USA, the bank holding company of Goldman Sachs. He was the seventh President of the Federal Reserve Bank of New York (1 January 1985 – 19 July 1993) and vice-chairman of the Federal Open Market Committee. Corrigan is also a member of the Group of Thirty, a prestigious and influential international financial advisory body which includes financiers and academics.

Since they became romantically involved in 1995, Minehan and Corrigan were under scrutiny about potential conflicts of interest. In 1996 Corrigan was named a partner at Goldman Sachs and in 1997 Minehan was on the Federal Open Market Committee, a committee within the Federal Reserve System, the central banking system of the United States. In 1997 a former Governor of the Federal Reserve Board, John P. LaWare, was quoted in the Boston Globe "questioning whether the relationship might not be in the best interest of the Federal Reserve." The couple consulted the general counsel for the Federal Reserve Bank, J. Virgil Mattingly and lawyers at Goldman Sachs when their relationship became serious.

They reside in Boston. Minehan has two children by a previous marriage and Corrigan has children from a former marriage.

== Philanthropy ==
In 2008, when Minehan and Gerry Corrigan donated $20 million to the Women's Heart Health Program and throughout the Massachusetts General Hospital Heart Center, the Heart Centre was renamed the Corrigan Minehan Heart Center and the Linda Anne Barlow Cardiac Surgical Intensive Care Unit and the Elizabeth Anne and Karen Barlow Corrigan Women's Heart Health Programs were established at MGH.

In 2011 Minehan, Henri Termeer and Chad Gifford— fellow Partners HealthCare Board Members— co-chaired the Massachusetts General Hospital bicentennial. The gala, with 1,000 in attendance, also served as a fundraiser, raising approximately $1 million.

Other offices
Preceded by Richard F. Syron	President of the Federal Reserve Bank of Boston; 1994–2007	Succeeded by Eric S. Rosengren
