= Frederick Steele Blackall Jr. =

American engineer (1896–1963)

Frederick Steele Blackall Jr. (November 26, 1896 – July 6, 1963) was an American engineer, and president and chairman of board Taft-Peirce Manufacturing Company, known as 72nd President of the American Society of Mechanical Engineers in 1953–54.

== Biography ==
=== Family and education ===
Blackall was born in 1896 in Roselle, New Jersey, to Frederick Steele Blackall and Bertha Gates (Brown) Blackall. His father was an engineer and inventor, who obtained some patents in the early 20th century. After attending the Abbott School in Farmington, Maine and the Phillips Academy, he obtained his obtained his BA in English from Yale University in 1918.

In World War I Blackall enlisted in the United States Navy, where he graduated from Third Reserve Officers' School at the United States Naval Academy in 1918. After the War he returned to college to study engineering at Massachusetts Institute of Technology, where he obtained his BSc in 1922.

=== Career and death ===
After his graduation from MIT in 1922 Blackall started his lifelong career at Taft-Peirce Manufacturing Company as staff officer in charge of the heat-treatment, electroplating, and steel supply departments. There he was "responsible for the reorganisation of the departmental layouts and the institution of radical changes in crude stock control and heating treating methods." Looking back at this period Blackall later admitted: "If one may be said to have any hobby in the field of engineering, mine is the metallurgy and heat-treatment of iron and steel."

In 1923 Blackall was promoted to Assistant to the general manager, responsible for the management of all engineering and production departments. Eventually in 1951, Blackall was named president of the company, and by 1964 he was chairman of the board. In the year 1953-54 he served as president of the American Society of Mechanical Engineers.

Blackall died in a plane crash at Sainte-Félicité near Matane, Quebec, on the Gaspé Peninsula, on July 7, 1963.

== Selected publications ==
- Blackall, Frederick Steele. Invention and Industry-Cradled in New England!. No. 160. Newcomen Society, American Branch, 1946.
- Blackall, Frederick Steele. Price Control in the Machine Tool Industry: With a Foreword by Henry Hazlitt. No. 447. American Enterprise Association, 1953.

Articles, a selection

- Blackall Jr, F. S. "The obligation of management to provide leadership." Mechanical Engineering 72.3 (1950): 229–231.
- Blackall Jr, F. S. "ASME Standards Save Lives and Dollars." Mechanical Engineering 75 (1953): 979–981.
