= Graham Blackall =

United States-based blogger

Graham Blackall is a United States-based blogger who covers food, and especially desserts. He is based in New Orleans.

Blackall established his blog Glazed and Confused in September 2013, and was immediately pleased with the audience it attracted. He styles and shoots the photos on his blog. His photography has been featured in Food & Wine, Bon Appétit, Visa Inc.'s Black Card Magazine, USA Today and Dessert Professional.

Blackall blogs in the style of Millennials, which is otherwise unconventional in food writing. He started baking at age 14.

Blackall designed the king cake fried sweet potato.
