= Taft-Peirce Manufacturing Company =

- Industry: manufacturing
- Founded: 1875
- Defunct: October 6, 1995
- Fate: dissolved
- Headquarters: Woonsocket, Rhode Island, United States
- Products: sewing machines, go/no go gauges

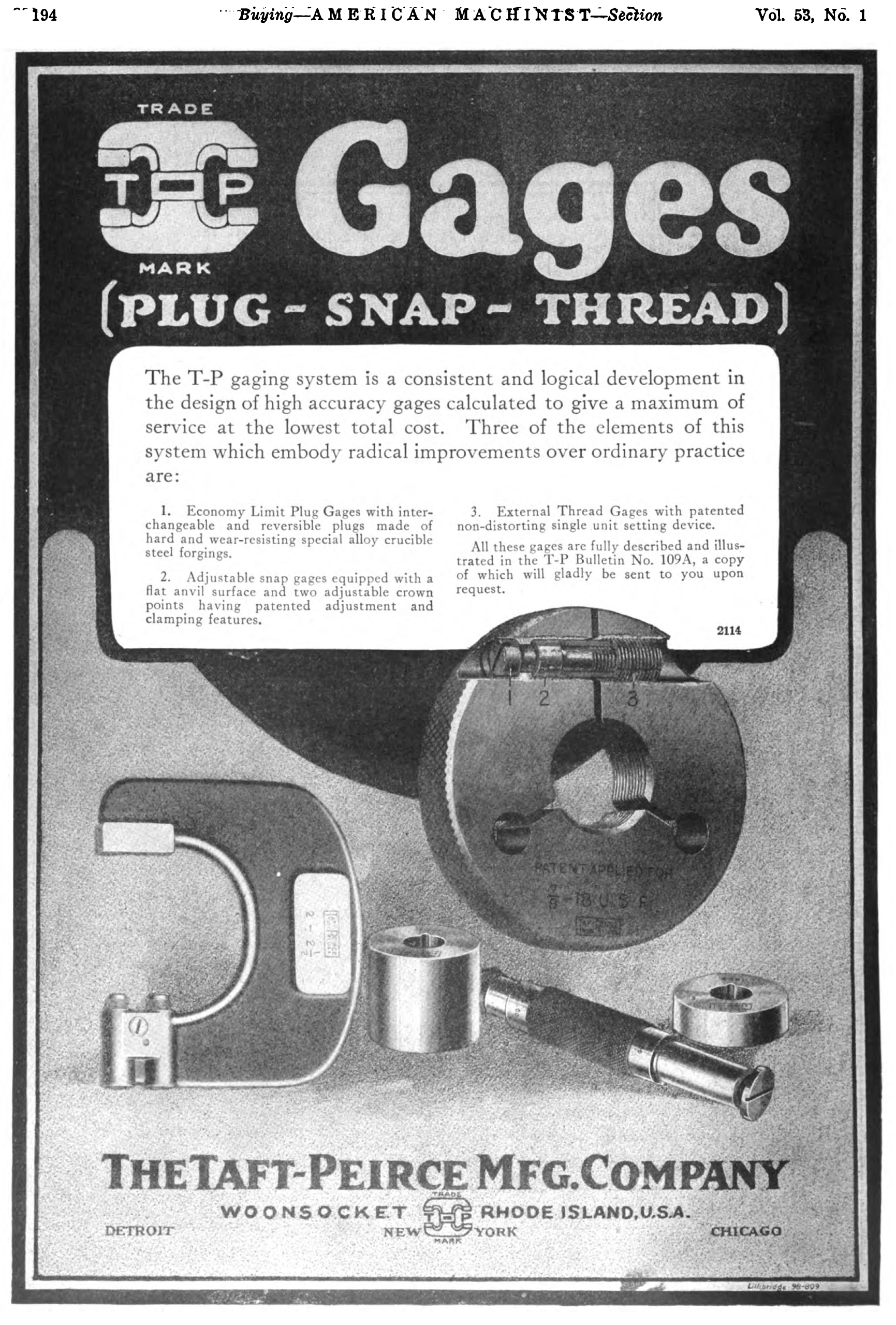
Taft-Peirce gauge advertisement in American Machinist, 1920.

The Taft-Peirce Manufacturing Company was a pioneering sewing machine company established in 1875 at Woonsocket, Rhode Island, United States. As the sewing machine industry gradually commoditized, Taft-Peirce leveraged its toolmaking capabilities to become a supplier of gauges, such as various kinds of go/no go gauges, to the manufacturing industries, and a supplier of engineering and toolroom work on a contract basis. The company was dissolved on 6 October 1995.

== See also ==
- List of sewing machine brands
