= First Universalist Church (Somerville, Massachusetts) =

Historic church in Massachusetts, United States

- U.S. National Register of Historic Places
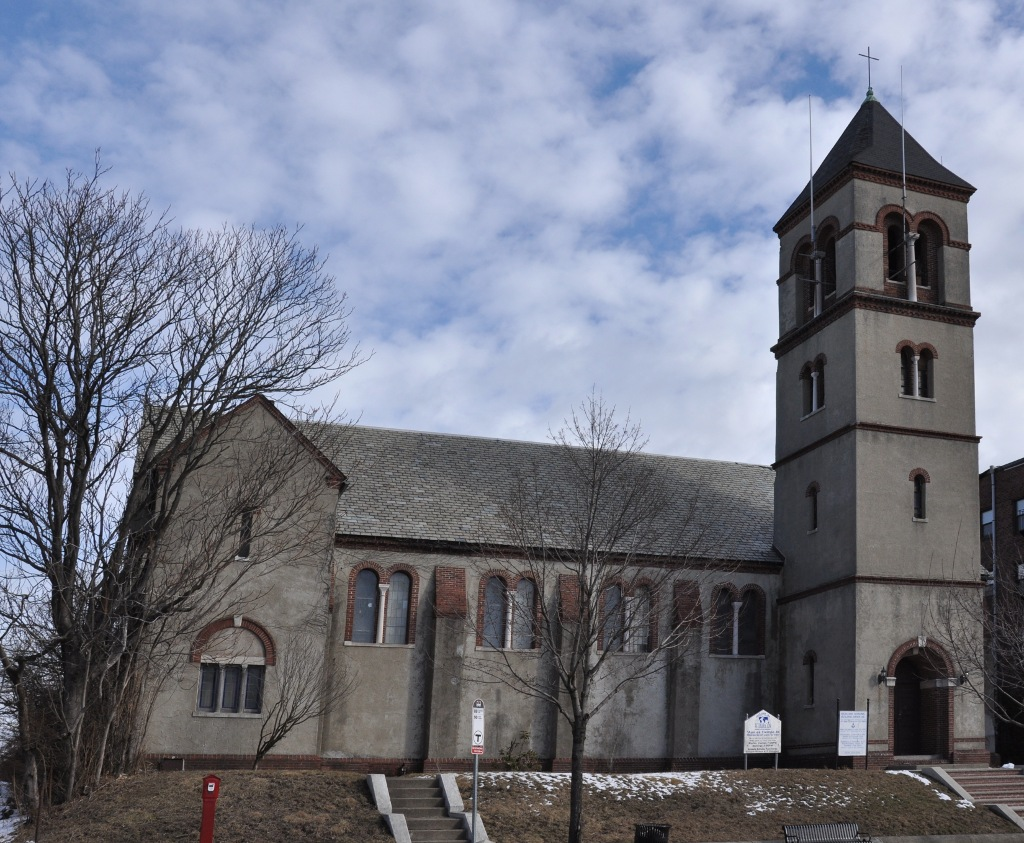

- Location within Massachusetts Location within the United States
- Location: Somerville, Massachusetts
- Coordinates: 42°23′16.15″N 71°6′3.24″W
- Built: 1916
- Architect: Ralph Adams Cram
- Architectural style: Romanesque
- MPS: Somerville MPS
- NRHP reference No.: 89001262
- Added to NRHP: September 18, 1989

The First Universalist Church is a historic Universalist Church building at 125 Highland Avenue in Somerville, Massachusetts. The Romanesque church building was built between 1916 and 1923 to a design by Ralph Adams Cram, and is the only example of his work in Somerville. The building was listed on the National Register of Historic Places in 1989. It is currently owned by the Highland Masonic Building Association, and is the home of King Solomon's Lodge AF & AM, the builders of the Bunker Hill Monument.

== Description and history ==
The First Universalist Church is located on the north side of Highland Avenue, opposite Trull Lane and the First Unitarian Church. It has a roughly cruciform shape, with a long body oriented parallel to the street, with a square tower projecting at the right end of the front and a gabled projection at the left end. The exterior is primarily plain stucco, with trim details in brick and terra cotta. The front facade has round-arch windows in pairs, framed by brick trim with a white pilaster in between. These window bays are set apart by buttresses with brick caps. The main entrance is set recessed in a round-arch opening at the base of the tower. The tower has four stages, demarcated by string courses of terra cotta. The lower stages have round-arch windows in similar style to the body, and the top stage has an open belfry with similar round-arch openings. It is capped by a pyramidal roof.

The congregation acquired this site in 1915, and the church was built from 1916 to 1923 to a design by the noted ecclesiastical architect Ralph Adams Cram, who produced a somewhat more Romanesque plan than the typical Gothical Revival work he is best known for. It was the last of several churches to be built along the stretch of Highland Avenue northwest of Somerville's civic area.

== Former buildings ==
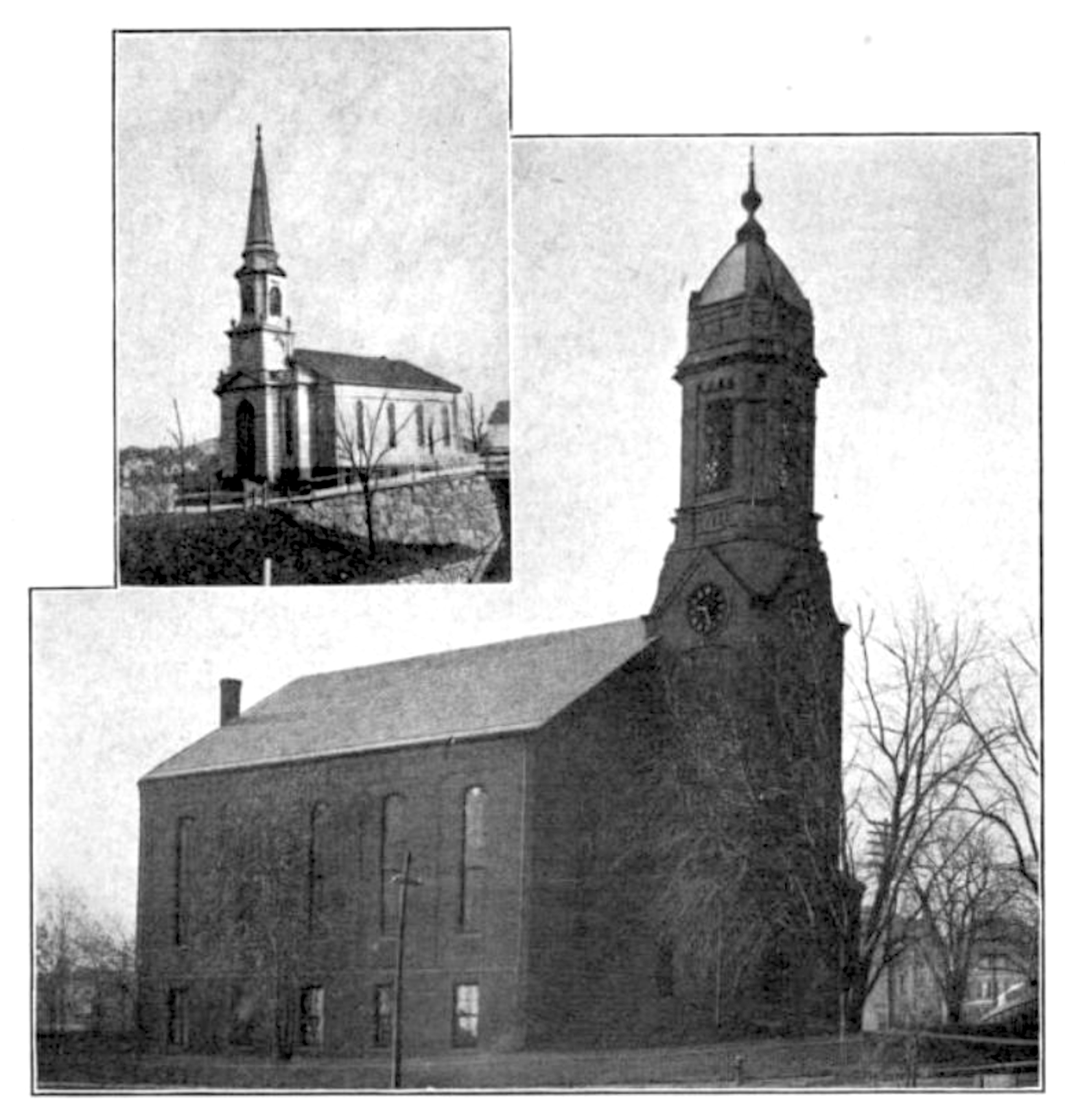
The congregation's first (1859–60) and second (1868–1869) buildings in East Somerville

The congregation was established in 1854 as the First Universalist Society of Somerville. That same year local businessman and philanthropist Charles Tufts donated to the new society a lot in East Somerville, at what is now Cross and Tufts Streets, two years after his larger land donation to what is now Tufts University. Money was raised for a chapel, and this building was completed in 1855. It was replaced by a larger building constructed in 1859-60. This in turn was destroyed in a fire in January 1868.

The congregation rebuilt the church, this time in brick, in 1869. They remained there until 1915. After the move, the former building was remodeled into a theatre, the Orpheum, by Nathan Hoffman. After the theatre closed in the 1950s, the building was used for warehouse purposes for many years. In 2001 the former church was renovated into a residential development now known as the Sanctuary Lofts.

== See also ==
- National Register of Historic Places listings in Somerville, Massachusetts
