= Saint Mary of Redford Catholic Church =

- U.S. National Register of Historic Places
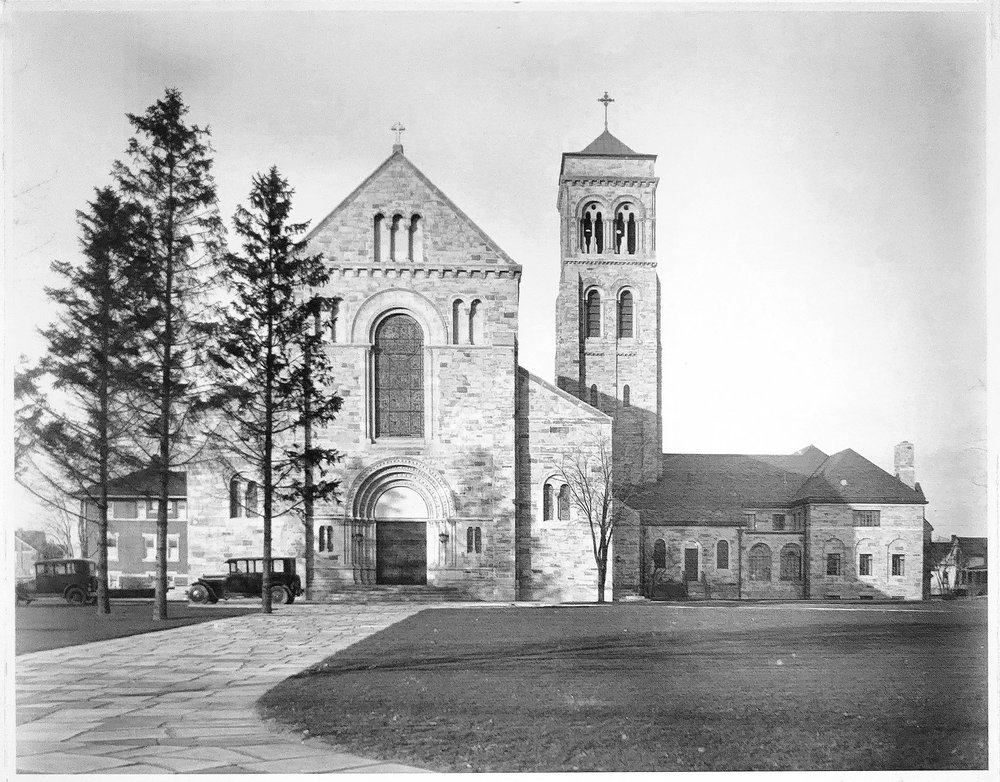
- Saint Mary of Redford, c. 1927
- Interactive map
- Location: 16098 Grand River Ave. Detroit, Michigan
- Coordinates: 42°23′47″N 83°12′21″W
- Built: 1927
- Built by: Talbot-Meier
- Architect: Ralph Adams Cram, Giffels and Rossetti
- Architectural style: Romanesque Revival
- NRHP reference No.: 100011641
- Added to NRHP: April 7, 2025

Saint Mary of Redford Catholic Church is a Catholic church and associated buildings located at 16098 Grand River Avenue in Detroit, Michigan. It was listed on the National Register of Historic Places in 2025.

== History ==
Saint Mary of Redford Catholic Church began in 1845 as the Greenfield and Redford parish. The first church building was constructed on the present site in 1857. This building was destroyed by fire in 1859, but rebuilt soon after. The parish grew slowly, and by 1919 numbered 150 families. Monsignor John Gimary Cook was appointed as parish priest that year, and immediately started a Catholic grade school. A school building and associated convent opened in 1920.

In 1927, the parish hired Ralph Adams Cram to design a new church building, rectory and convent. The church and rectory were constructed in 1927, and the convent later in 1949. The parish grew quickly in this time frame, and multiple additions were made to the school in 1925, 1929, and 1952. By 1953, 4100 families were members of the congregation, making the parish the largest in the state of Michigan. In 1962, a new high school was constructed.

However, both the size of the parish and enrollment in the school declined in the 1970s. In 1989, the parish was administratively combined with two neighboring parishes. The high school closed in 1992, and the building was sold to the Detroit Public Schools in 2000 and reopened as the Communication & Media Arts High School The elementary school closed in 2009, and the sisters who lived in the associated convent left soon after.

== Description ==
Saint Mary of Redford Catholic Church consists of three buildings: an interconnected church, rectory, and convent; an elementary school, and a high school. The entire complex sits on a lot of 7.84 acres, and spans an entire block wide and deep. The church, convent, rectory building is set well back from Grand River Avenue, and the school buildings front on Mansfield, the side street.

The church building is clad in light gray and brown granite blocks. Decorative trim is in smooth limestone. The roof is covered with slate. The building has metal casement windows, filled with stained glass in the nave. A center entrance has solid wooden double doors framed in a limestone surround. A blind arch is above, and is topped with a large stained glass window.
