= New England Mutual Life Insurance Building (Boston) =

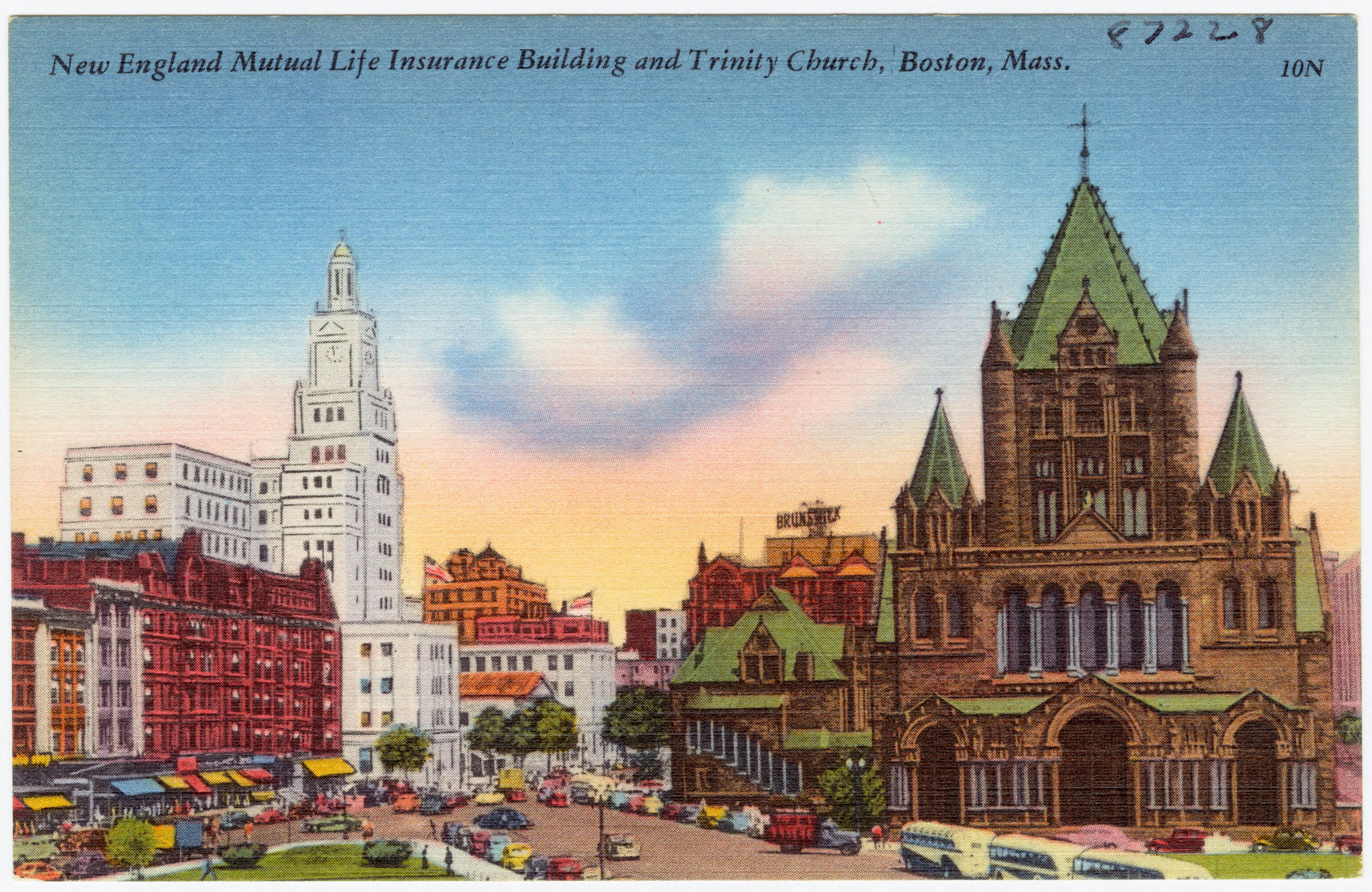
The building (left) on a 1940s postcard

The New England Mutual Life Insurance Building is located near Boston's Copley Square. Construction began in 1939 and the building officially opened in 1941. The building land was purchased in 1937 from Massachusetts Institute of Technology (MIT), and was converted into an office building for the New England Mutual Life Insurance Company, a company later purchased by MetLife Inc. The land, before purchased by New England Mutual Life, was home to two MIT buildings on their originally established campus, the Rogers Building and the Walker Building. These two buildings were demolished to make way for the construction of this new office building.

== History ==
Originally a part of the Massachusetts Institute of Technology, this building was bought by the New England Mutual Life Insurance Company. James Savage served as one of the original board members of the insurance company and had a daughter, Emma, who married William Barton Rogers, who, with the help of the Savage family, would go on to found MIT in 1865.

The Rogers Building, the original building on the principal campus of MIT, was torn down to make way for this building.

== Construction ==
The New England Mutual Life Insurance Building was built in historic Boston, in a section of the city known as the Back Bay. This land is a neighborhood located just south of the Charles River, which separates the heart of Boston from Cambridge.

Ralph Adams Cram, an architect known for designing a number of different types of buildings (including residences, churches, libraries and academic buildings, and various office spaces) designed this new office building for New England Mutual Life Insurance. Cram also had ties to MIT, as he headed their Architecture Department for seven years.

Once the land was purchased by The New England Mutual Life Insurance Company, the buildings were demolished due to foundational issues with the original MIT buildings. To fix this issue, the architects who designed this new building built on a "floating foundation", which helps to prevent undue settling.

The building itself is 10-stories made from granite. Inside, there is a large auditorium that was used for live performances and lectures from the 1940's to the 1960's.
