= Chapel of St. Anne (Arlington, Massachusetts) =

- U.S. National Register of Historic Places
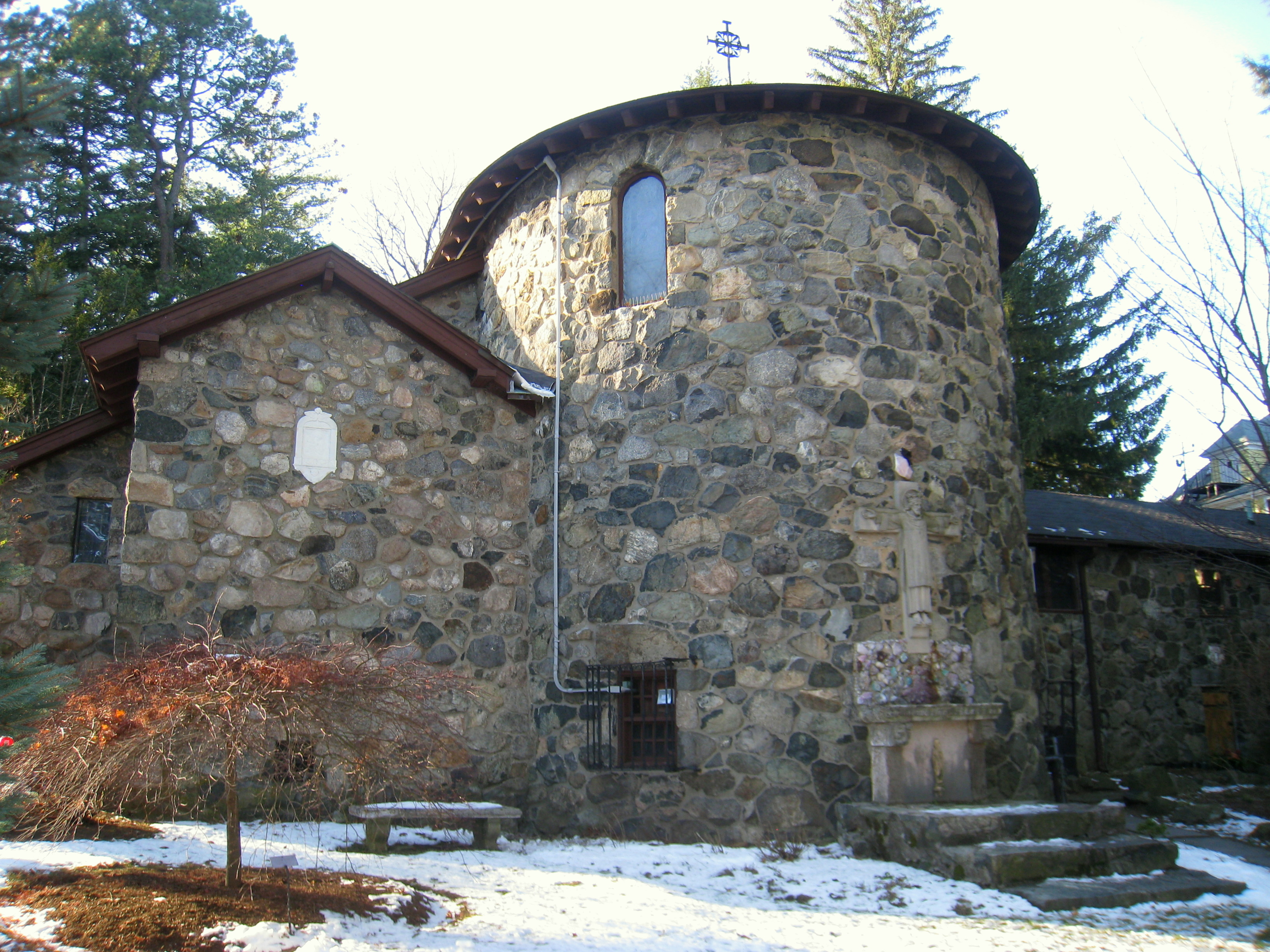

- Location within Massachusetts Location within the United States
- Location: 20 Claremont Ave., Arlington, Massachusetts
- Coordinates: 42°25′24″N 71°11′3″W
- Built: 1915
- Architect: Ralph Adams Cram
- MPS: Arlington MRA
- NRHP reference No.: 85001026
- Added to NRHP: April 18, 1985

The Chapel of St. Anne is a historic Episcopal chapel on Claremont Avenue in Arlington, Massachusetts. Built in 1915, it is the town's only work of the architect Ralph Adams Cram, and is an example of Norman Gothic architecture. The chapel was listed on the National Register of Historic Places in 1985.

== Description and history ==
The chapel is set on the east side of Claremont Avenue in a residential part of Arlington Heights, on the grounds of the Youth Villages-Germaine Lawrence Campus. This property was, at the time of the chapel's construction in 1915, part of an Episcopalian orphanage. Ralph Adams Cram designed the chapel, although it is done in Norman style rather than Cram's more well-known Gothic Victorian. Its stained-glass windows are by a frequent Cram collaborator, Charles Connick.

The chapel is a two-story roughly rectangular stone structure, oriented east–west, with a gabled roof. The stone used in its construction was locally gathered, and integrates a number of unusual features, including a paving stone from the Cambridge sewer system, a 16th-century madonna and child figure executed in Carrara marble, and ecclesiastical wood carvings. It has a gracefully curved apse, and a rose window in the gable at the western end.

The Society of St. John the Evangelist (Cowley Fathers) established an orphanage on this property in 1910, and initially held its religious services in a small wood-frame chapel. The present chapel was built to replace that structure. In 1928 the property was repurposed to become the St. Anne's School for Girls, named for the order of nuns who ran the facility.

In 1978 the nuns began to separate the religious aspect from the school, which had come to serve predominantly emotionally troubled children. This resulted in the creation in 1980 of the Germaine Lawrence School, since merged with the Youth Villages organization.

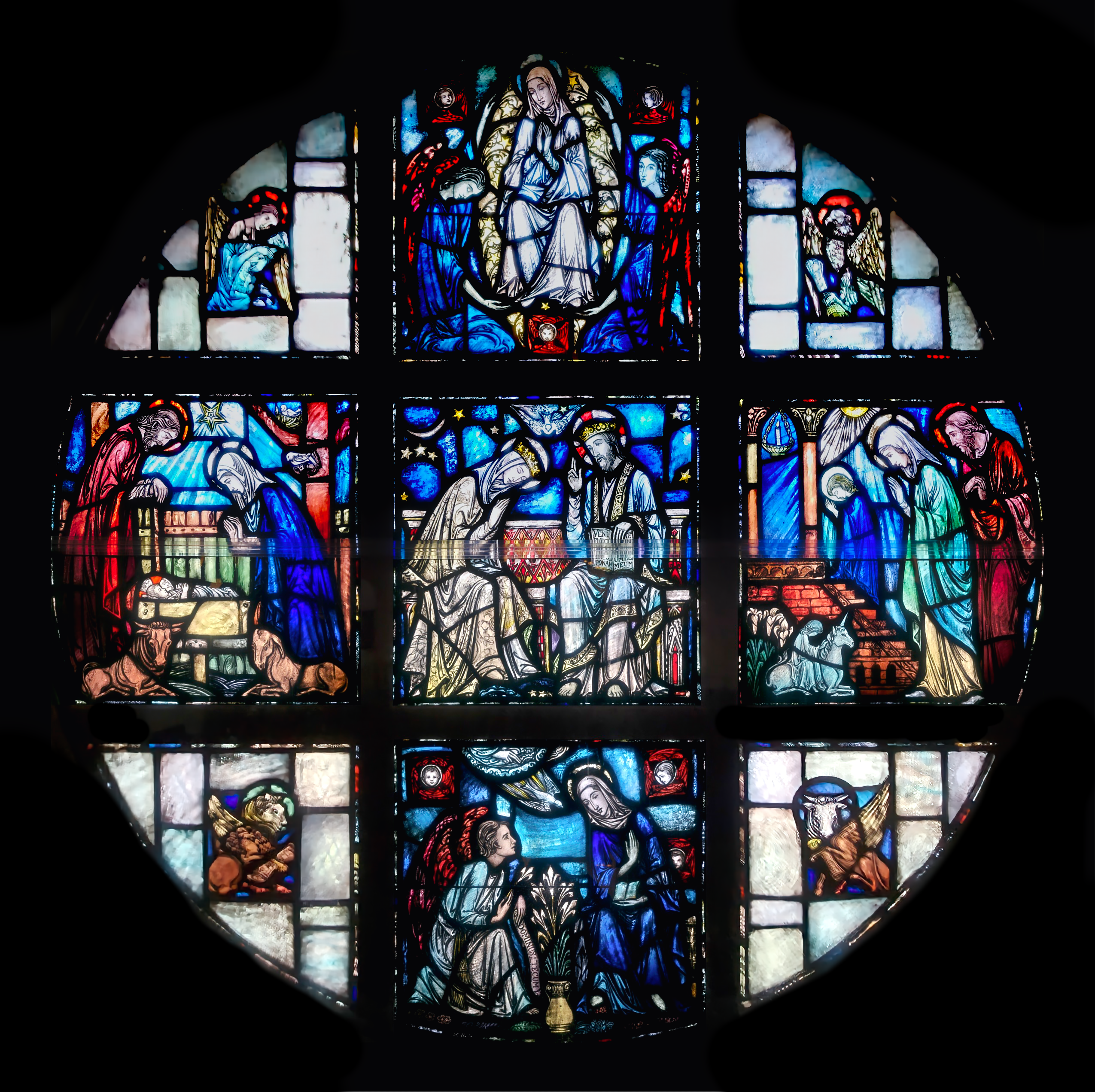
Charles J. Connick Stained-glass Window

== See also ==
- National Register of Historic Places listings in Arlington, Massachusetts
