= Christ Church (Hyde Park, Boston) =

Historic church in Massachusetts, United States

- U.S. National Register of Historic Places
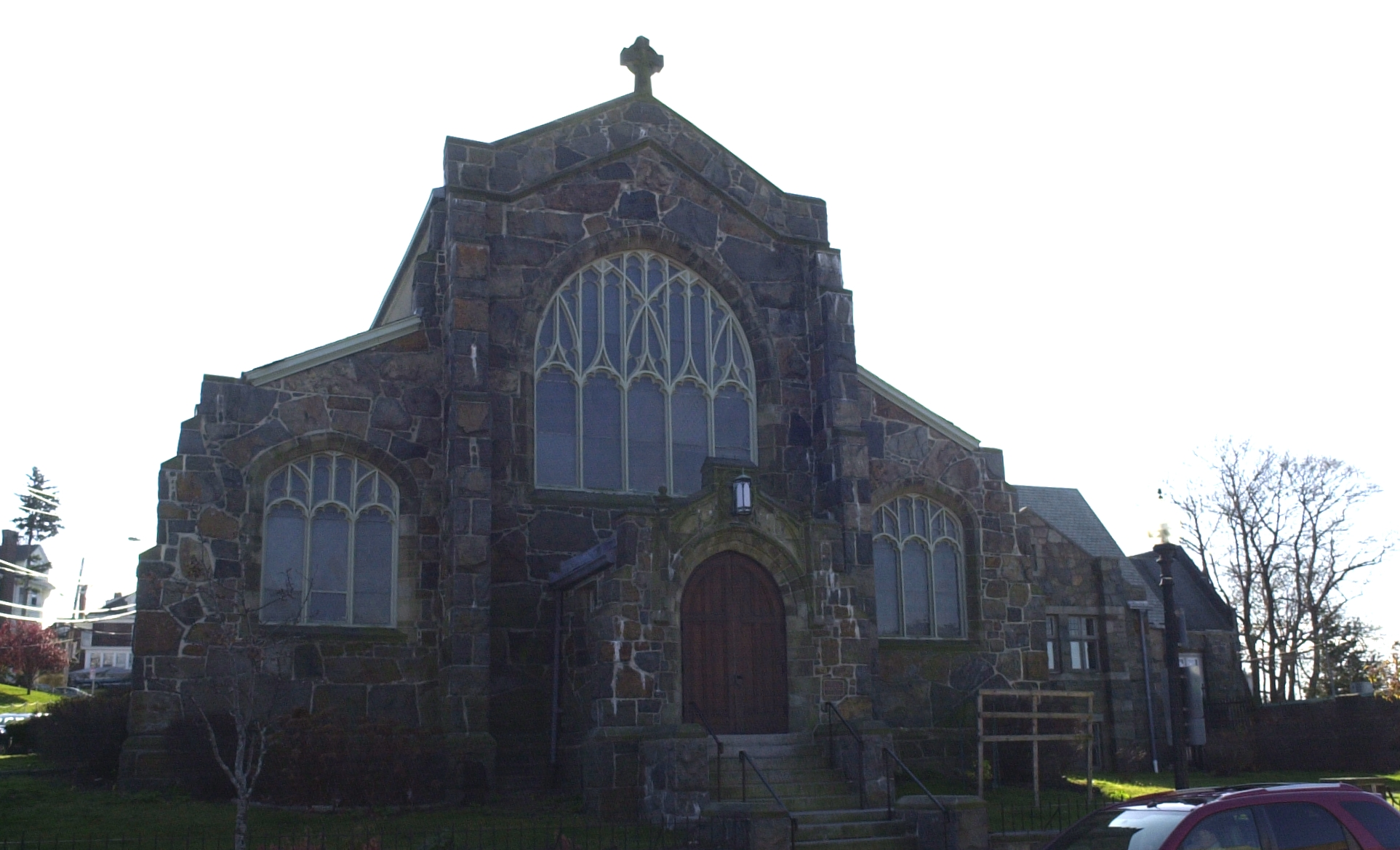

- Location within Massachusetts Location within the United States
- Location: Boston, Massachusetts
- Coordinates: 42°15′21.1″N 71°7′20.8″W
- Area: 0.5 acres (0.20 ha)
- Built: 1893
- Architect: Ralph Adams Cram; Cram & Wentworth
- Architectural style: Late Gothic Revival
- NRHP reference No.: 86000140
- Added to NRHP: January 30, 1986

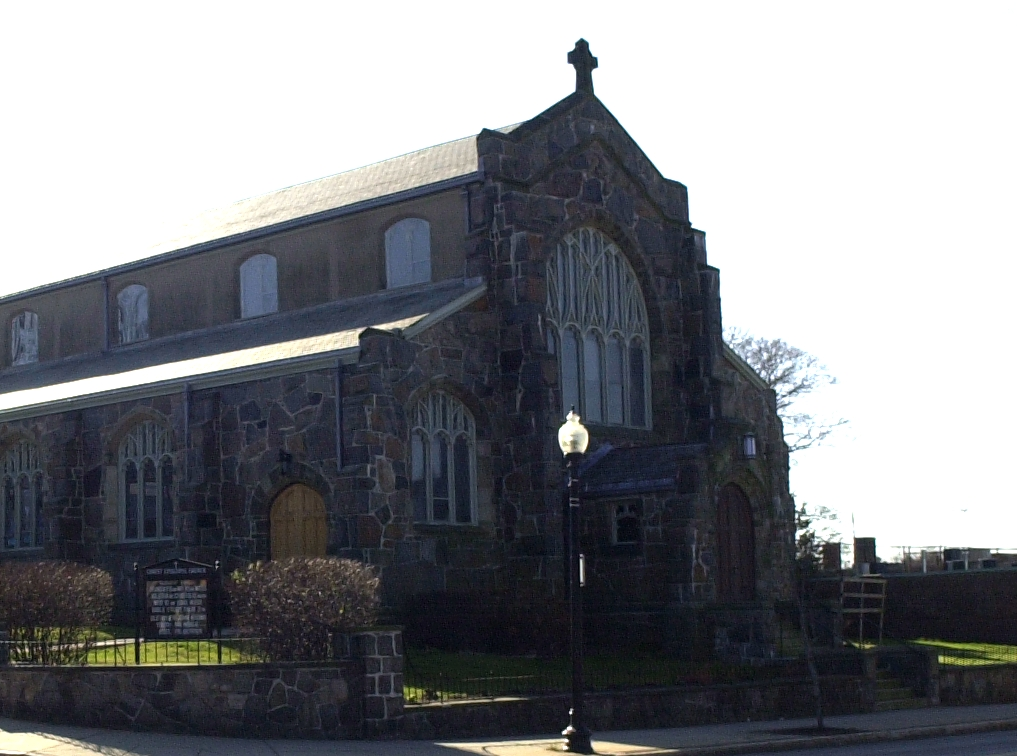

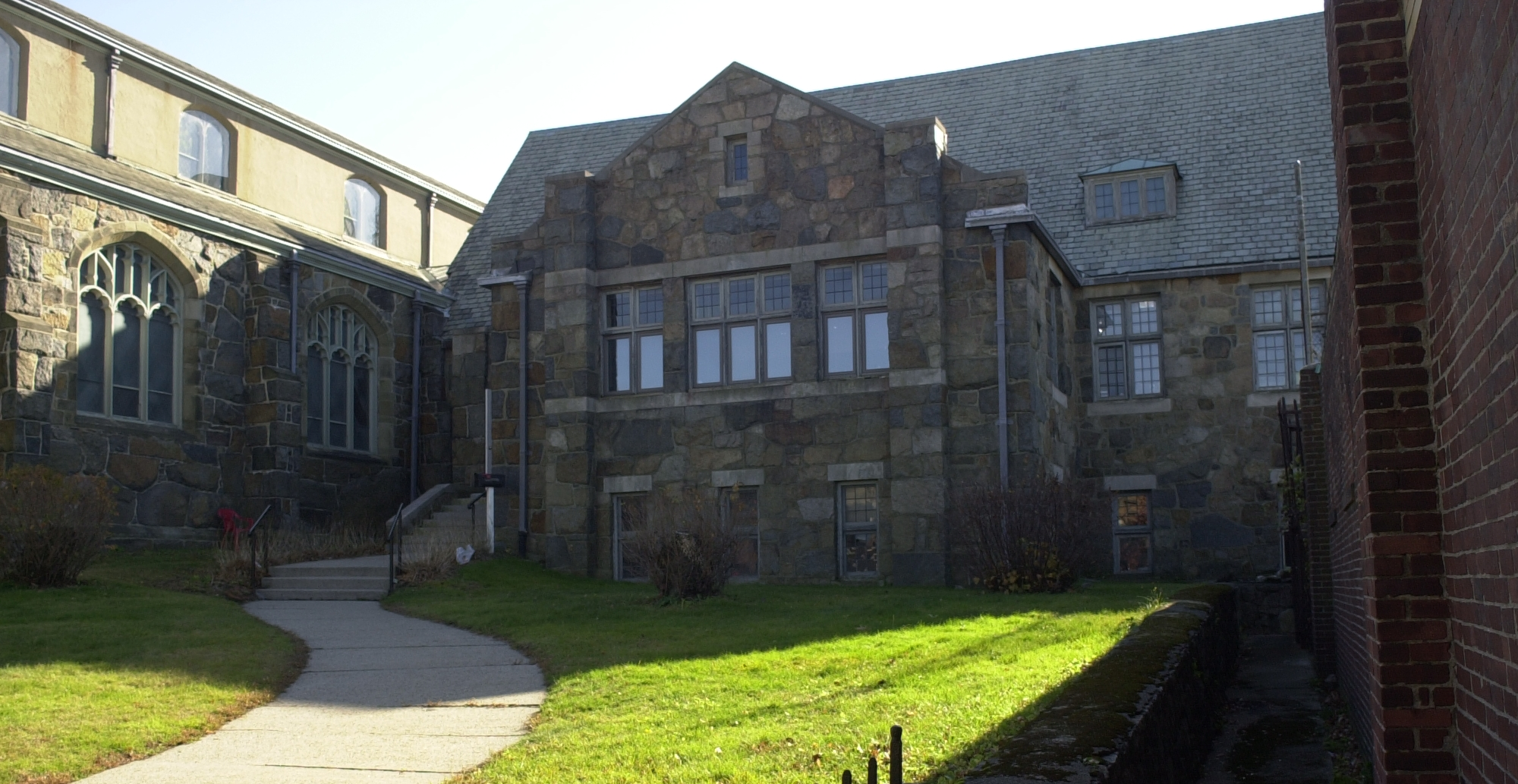

Christ Church, officially The Parish of Christ Church, Hyde Park is a historic church building built in 1893 at 1220 River Street in Hyde Park, Massachusetts, a neighborhood of Boston. It is a parish of the Episcopal Diocese of Massachusetts.

Christ Church was the second church building designed by Ralph Adams Cram (after the nearby All Saints' Church, Ashmont), who went on to design many church buildings, notably the Cathedral of St. John the Divine, New York City. The church was built in 1893 and added to the National Historic Register in 1986.

== See also ==
- National Register of Historic Places listings in southern Boston, Massachusetts
