= First Unitarian Church (Somerville, Massachusetts) =

Historic church in Massachusetts, United States

- U.S. National Register of Historic Places
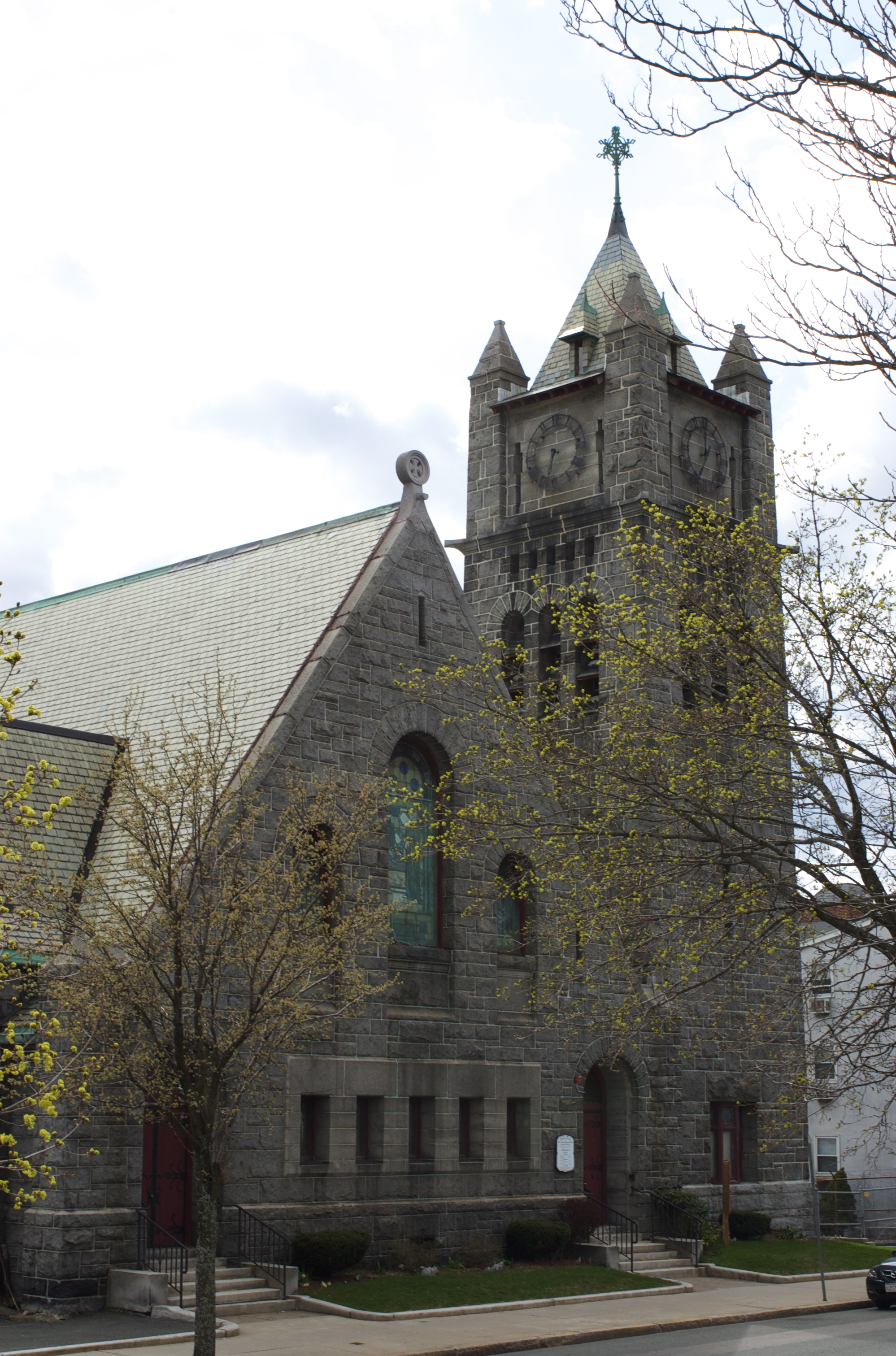
- The former First Unitarian Church, photographed in 2009.

- Location within Massachusetts Location within the United States
- Location: 130 Highland Ave, Somerville, Massachusetts
- Coordinates: 42°23′15.2″N 71°6′5.3″W
- Built: 1894-95
- Architect: Hartwell & Richardson
- Architectural style: Richardsonian Romanesque
- NRHP reference No.: 89001264
- Added to NRHP: September 18, 1989

The former First Unitarian Church is a historic church building at 130 Highland Avenue in Somerville, Massachusetts. The stone church was built in 1894 for a Unitarian congregation. It was designed by Hartwell & Richardson and is a good example of Richardsonian Romanesque design. The building presently (2022) houses the Mission Church of Our Lord Jesus Christ.

== Building history ==
The congregation that built this church was established in 1844 and built its first church in Central Hill Park in the same year. The new building was designed by architect Richard Bond of Boston and built by Louis C. Edgerly of Somerville. It was completed in 1845 and in 1846 the congregation called its first pastor, John Turner Sargent, an associate and defender of Theodore Parker, the transcendentalist. The building was destroyed by fire in 1852 and replaced in 1853-54 with a new church designed by architect Thomas W. Silloway, which burned in 1867. The third and last church in Central Hill Park was completed in 1869. In 1893 the City purchased the building as part of the site for the new Somerville High School, which was begun the same year. The fourth church, a block up Highland Avenue, was begun in 1894 to a design by Hartwell & Richardson, who also designed the new high school and the Broadway Winter Hill Congregational Church. They designed the building in the then-popular Richardsonian Romanesque style, named for Henry Hobson Richardson, who was not related to the architect of the Somerville church. A Gothic Revival design was also proposed by Cram, Wentworth & Goodhue but was rejected. The new church was completed in 1895, after which the old building was demolished.

In 1930 the Second Unitarian Church of Somerville, organized in 1891, merged with the First Unitarian Church. In 1975 the congregation was dissolved and in 1976 the building was purchased by the Mission Church of Our Lord Jesus Christ, an Apostolic Pentecostal church, which continues to occupy it in 2022.

The building was listed on the National Register of Historic Places in 1989.

== Architecture ==
The First Unitarian Church building is located on the south side of Highland Avenue, at its western corner with Trull Lane, about one block west of Somerville's cluster of civic buildings on Central Hill. The church is a handsome stone structure, with a tall and steeply pitched gable roof, and a square tower at its right front corner. Entrances are located on the north-facing front facade at either end of the gable, which has a bank of five rectangular stained-glass windows below three tall round-arch stained glass windows in the gable. The tower rises through two levels to a belfry which has tripled round-arch louvered openings on each side, with a fourth stage housing a multi-faced clock with stone piers at the corners rising to pyramidal caps. The tower is capped by a slate pyramidal roof. The building is a fine local example of the Richardsonian Romanesque style for which its architects were well known.

=== Stained glass ===
The church features extensive stained glass, including several memorial windows. The largest of these, in the center of the Highland Avenue facade, depicts Christ healing the sick and was dedicated in memory of Columbus Tyler (1805-1881) and Mary Elizabeth (Sawyer) Tyler (1806-1889), long-time supporters of the church. This is flanked by windows representing the Angel of Charity and the Angel of Faith, dedicated to Rufus B. Stickney and Nathan and Sally Tufts, respectively.

== Gallery ==
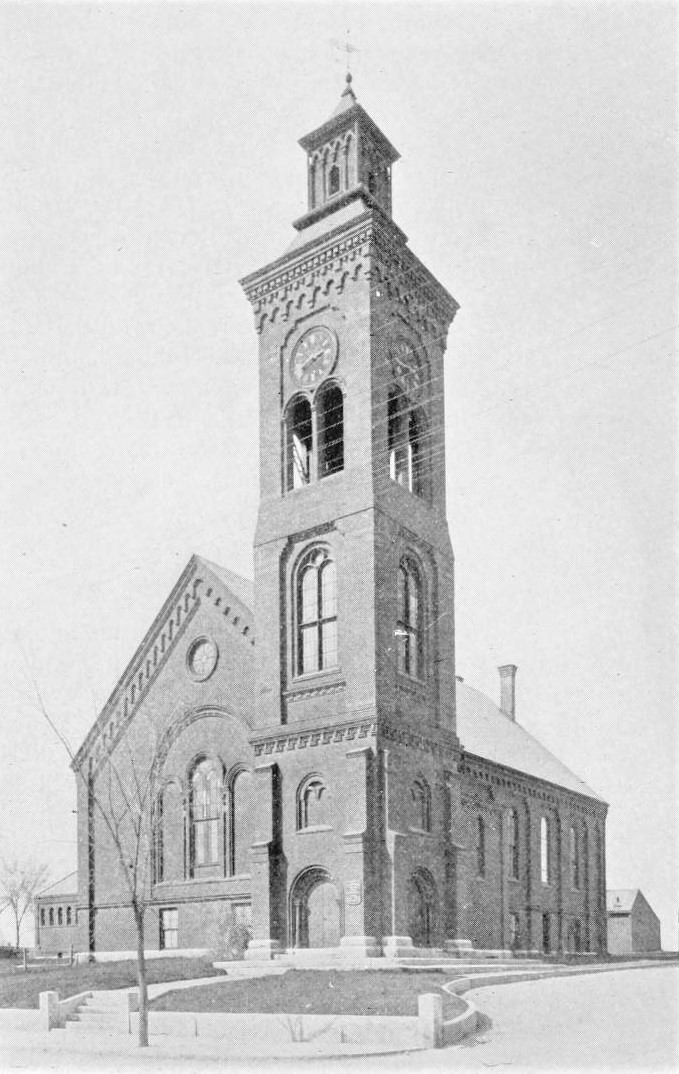
The congregation's former building in Central Hill Park, completed in 1869.

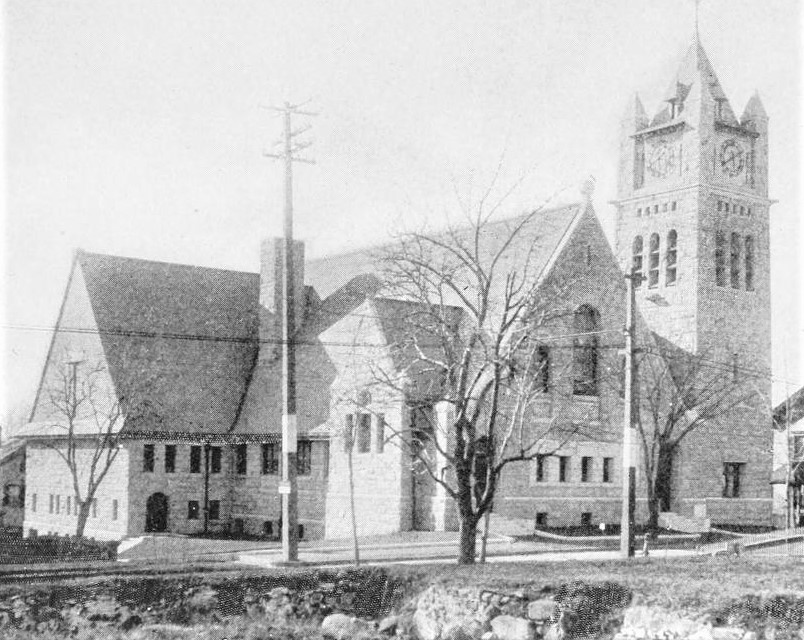
The former First Unitarian Church, photographed soon after completion in 1897.

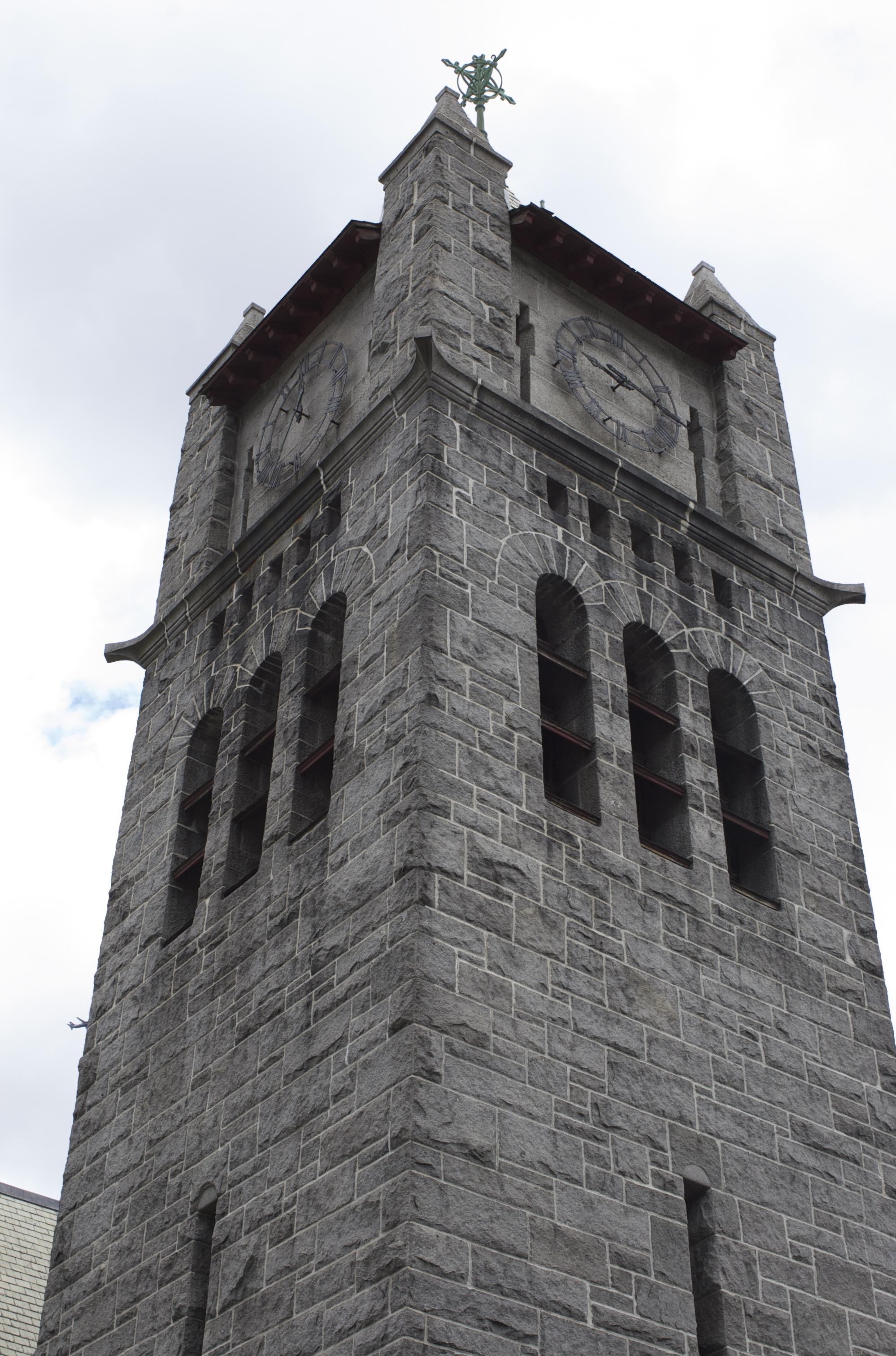
The church tower, photographed in 2009.

== See also ==
- National Register of Historic Places listings in Somerville, Massachusetts
