= Blacksburg Historic District =

Historic district in Virginia, United States

- U.S. National Register of Historic Places
- U.S. Historic district
- Virginia Landmarks Register
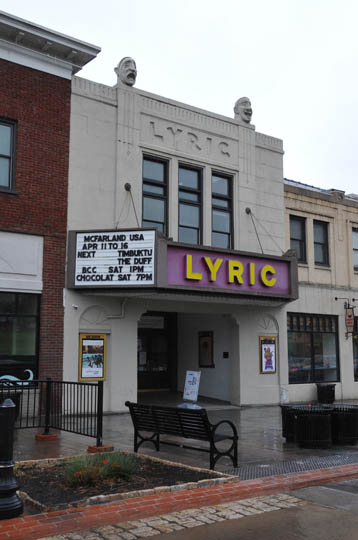
- Lyric Theater

- Location within Virginia Location within the United States
- Location: Roughly, area N of jct. of Main and Jackson Sts. including sections out along Lee and Progress Sts., Blacksburg, Virginia
- Coordinates: 37°13′54″N 80°24′46″W
- Area: 72 acres (29 ha)
- Architect: Cram, Ralph Adams; Et al.
- Architectural style: Colonial Revival, Gothic, Greek Revival
- MPS: Montgomery County MPS
- NRHP reference No.: 90002165
- VLR No.: 150-0108

Significant dates
- Added to NRHP: January 31, 1991
- Designated VLR: June 20, 1989

Blacksburg Historic District is a national historic district located at Blacksburg, Montgomery County, Virginia. The district encompasses 137 contributing buildings and 2 contributing sites in the central business district and surrounding residential areas of the town of Blacksburg. The district includes commercial, residential, and institutional buildings in a variety of popular architectural styles including Greek Revival, Gothic Revival, and Colonial Revival. Notable buildings include the Johnson House (c. 1840), Blacksburg Presbyterian Church #1 (1847), Smith-Montgomery House (c. 1825), Croy House, Spout Spring House, Deyerle's Store (1875-1877), W. B. Conway Building, Presbyterian manse (1907), Sheriff Camper House (c. 1910), Christ Episcopal Church (1875-1879, with tower added in 1934 by Ralph Adams Cram), African Methodist Episcopal Church of Blacksburg, Blacksburg Presbyterian Church (1904), Blacksburg Methodist Church (1910), St. Mary's Catholic Church, Hunter's Lodge Masonic Building (1928), Martin-Logan Store (c. 1925), Lyric Theater (1922), and Ellett's Drug Store (1900).

It was listed on the National Register of Historic Places in 1991.

== Gallery ==
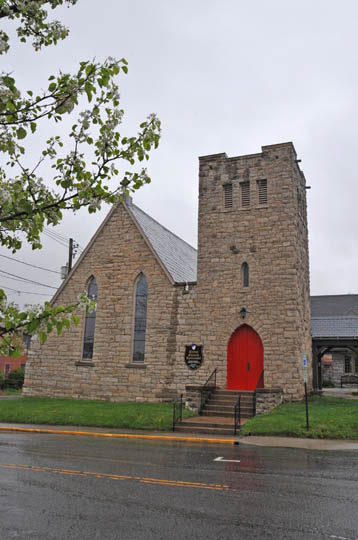
Christ Episcopal Church
