= Christ Church United Methodist =

Church in Manhattan, New York

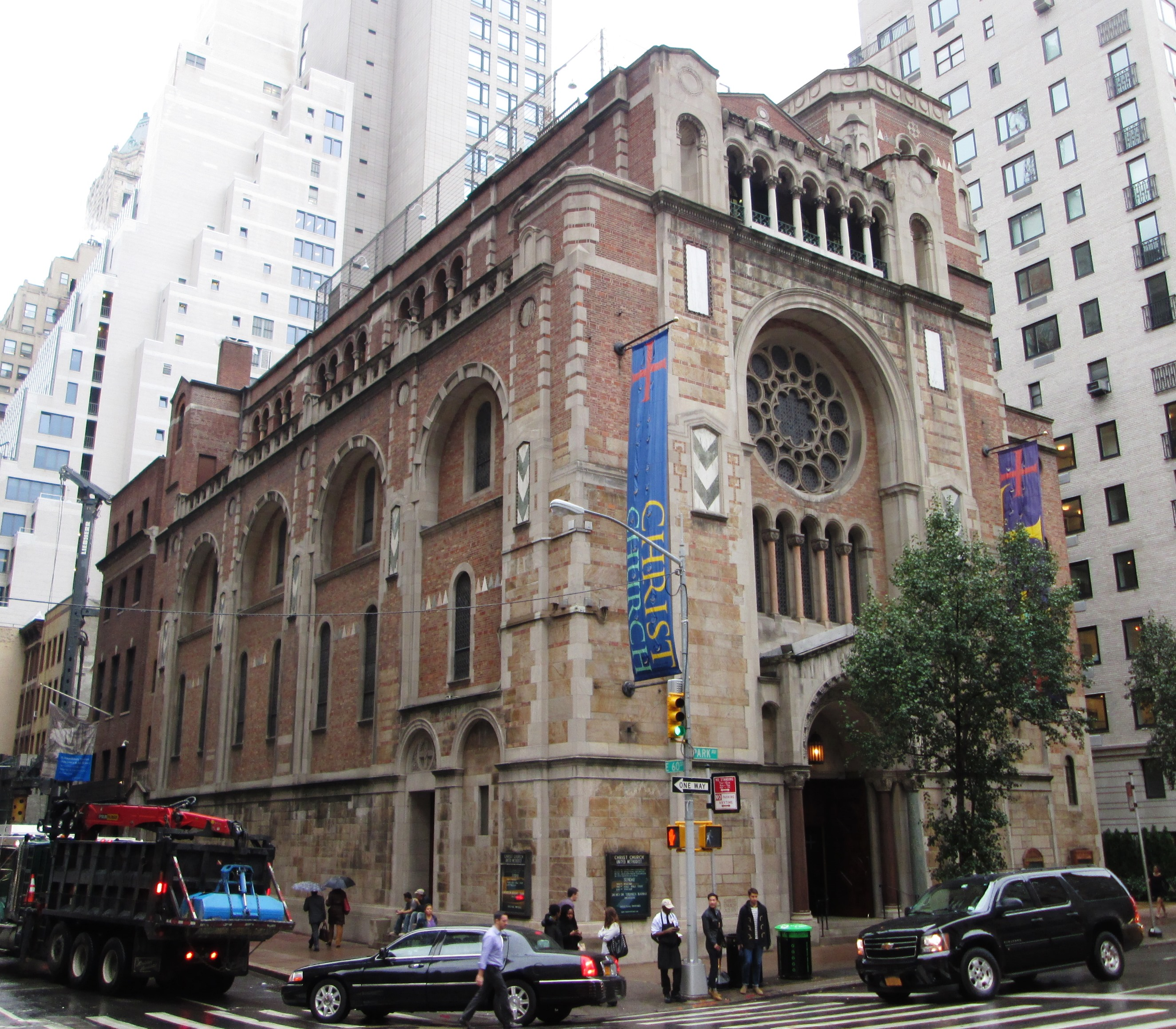
- Christ Church United Methodist
- 40°45′49.82″N 73°58′10.31″W
- Location: 524 Park Avenue, New York, NY
- Country: United States
- Denomination: United Methodist Church
- Website: christchurchnyc.org

History
- Dedicated: 1933; 93 years ago

Architecture
- Architect: Ralph Adams Cram
- Groundbreaking: 1931
- Completed: 1949; 77 years ago

Christ Church, United Methodist is a United Methodist church on the Upper East Side of Manhattan in New York City.

== History ==
Located at the northwest corner of Park Avenue and 60th Street, the church was built primarily during 1931–1933. Church services began in 1933 but financial impacts of the Great Depression and shortages of World War II prevented the mosaics planned for the interior from being executed until 1948–49. The church was designed by Ralph Adams Cram, who is known for his Gothic Revival ecclesiastical architecture. While designing this church, he used a combination of Romanesque and Byzantine Revival styles instead.

In addition to its operation as a church, Christ Church has operated an early childhood day school since 1949.

== Gallery ==
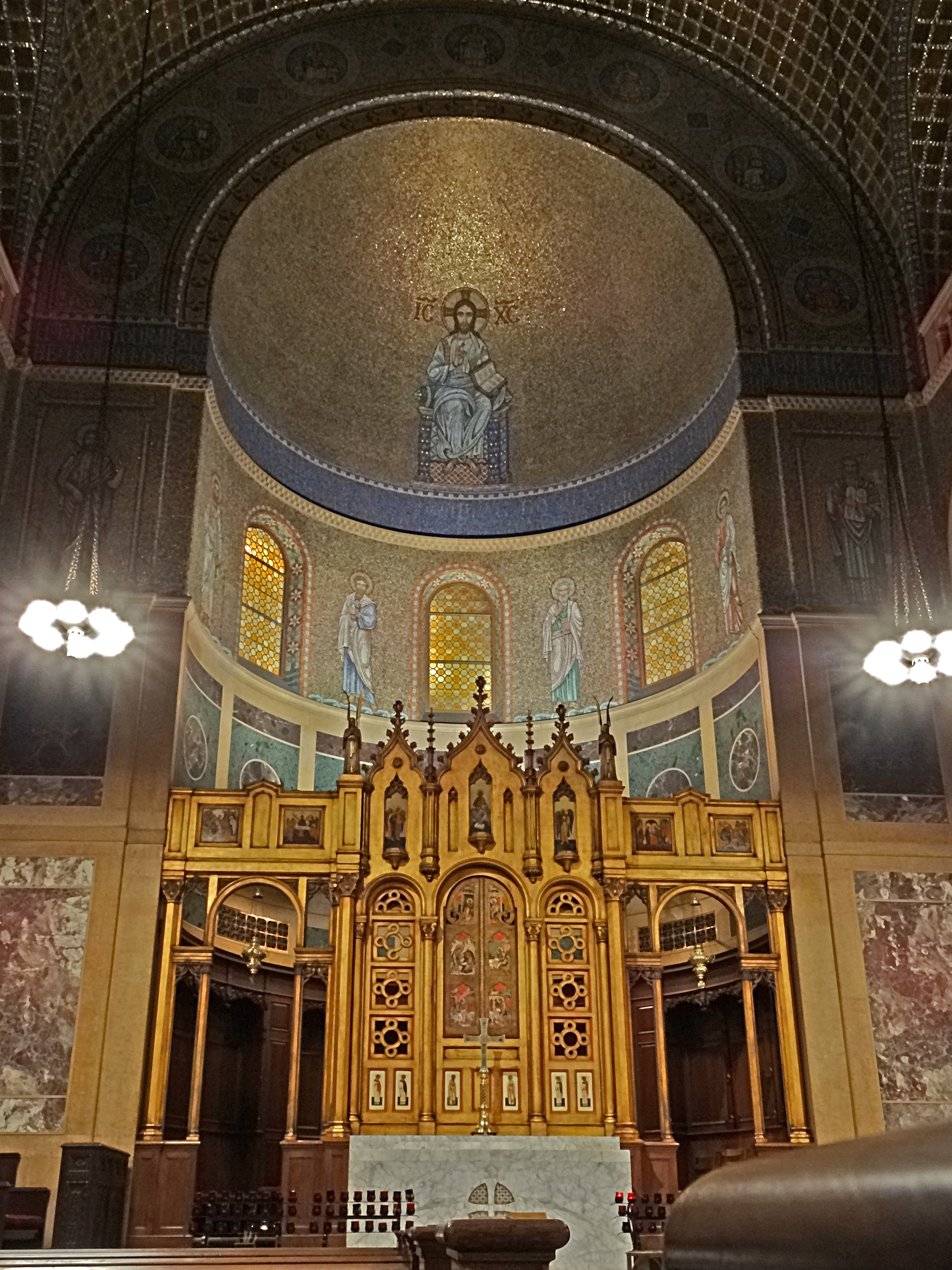
Choir

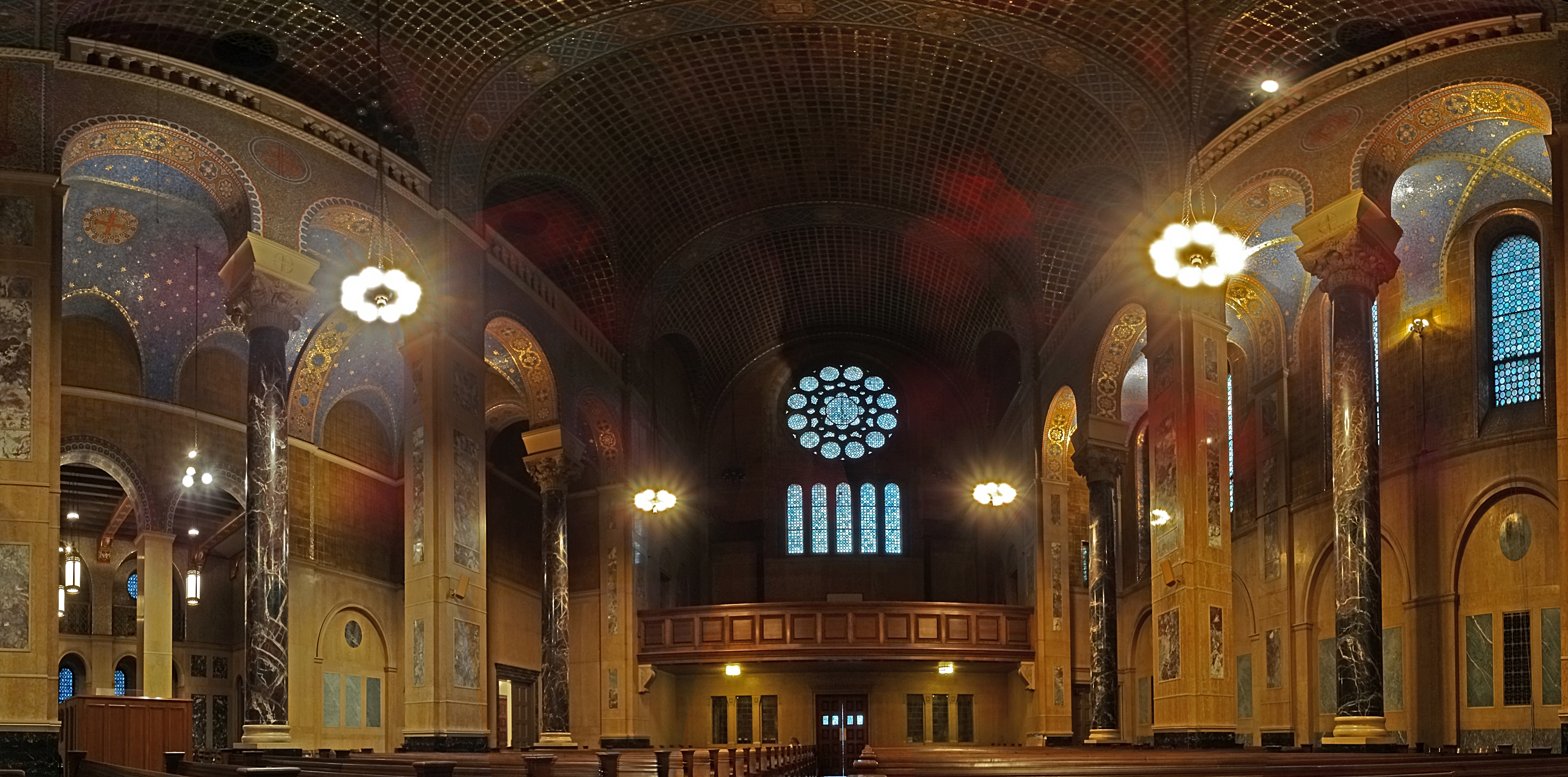
Inside view
