= Ryland Hall (Richmond, Virginia) =

- U.S. National Register of Historic Places
- Virginia Landmarks Register
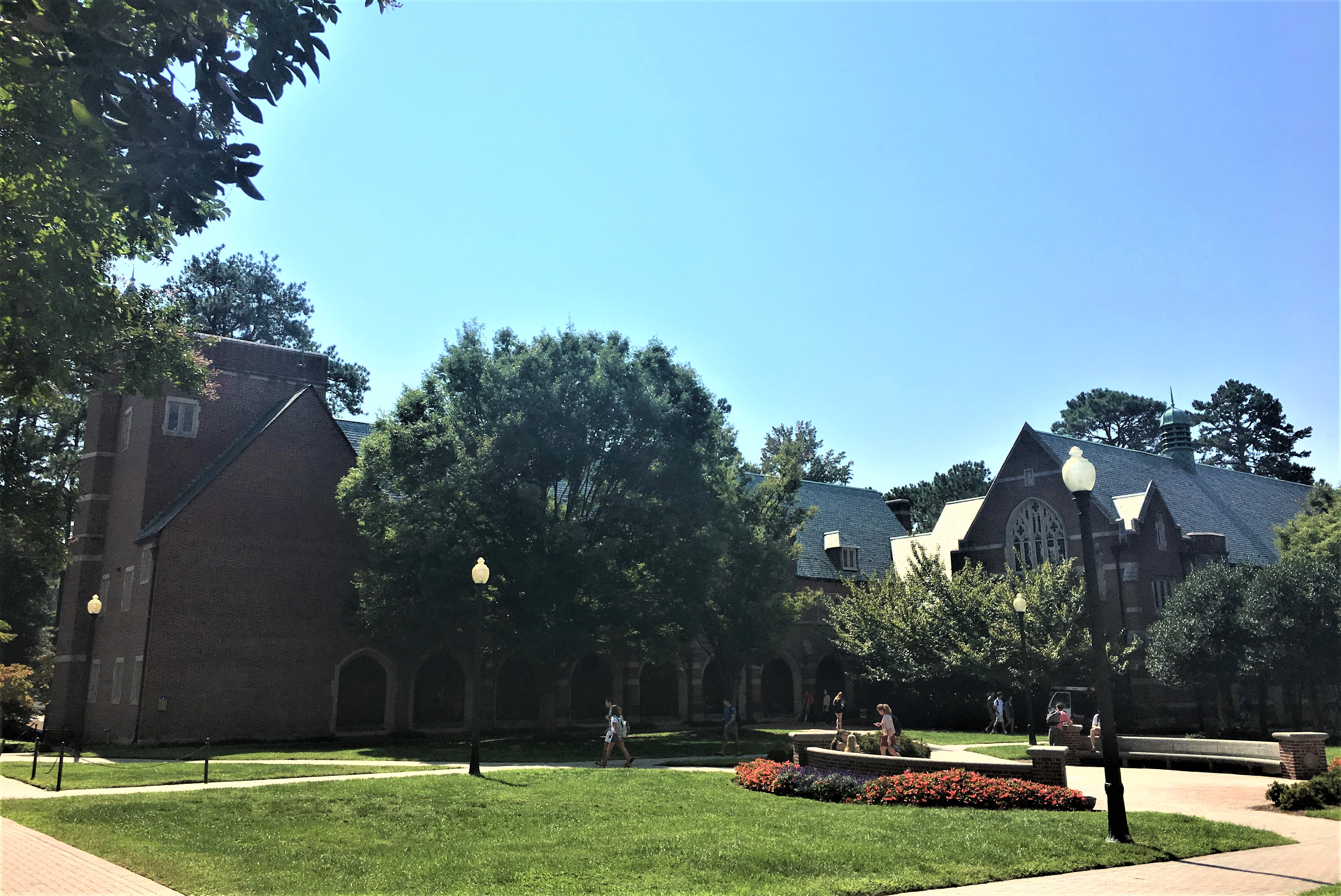

- Location within Virginia Location within the United States
- Location: 2 Ryland Circle, Richmond, Virginia
- Coordinates: 37°34′39″N 77°32′14″W
- Area: 0.597 acres (0.242 ha)
- Built: 1913
- Architect: Ralph Adams Cram
- MPS: History and Architecture of the University of Richmond, 1834-1977
- NRHP reference No.: 13000261
- VLR No.: 127-0364-0001

Significant dates
- Added to NRHP: May 7, 2013
- Designated VLR: December 13, 2012

Ryland Hall is a historic academic building located on the University of Richmond campus in Richmond, Virginia. The building was originally built for Richmond College, which together with Westhampton College became the University of Richmond in 1920. It was designed by architect Ralph Adams Cram and built in 1913 in the Collegiate Gothic style. The brick, stone, and concrete building consists of two parallel wings, Robert Ryland and Charles Ryland halls, set apart by a connecting loggia. The three- to four-story building features leaded glass windows with Gothic tracery, decorative concrete sculptural elements, and a gable roof with slate shingles.

It was listed on the National Register of Historic Places in 2013.

In 2022, the University of Richmond renamed Ryland Hall to the Humanities Building in accordance with the Naming Principles adopted by the Board of Trustees on March 26, 2022. Ryland Hall was renamed along with Puryear Hall, Sarah Brunet Hall, Jeter Hall, Thomas Hall, and Freeman Hall, now respectively known as Fountain Hall, the Refectory (reflecting its original purpose and name), Residence Hall #1, Residence Hall #2, and Residence Hall #3.
