= Conventual Church of St. Mary and St. John =

Historic church in Massachusetts, United States

- U.S. National Register of Historic Places
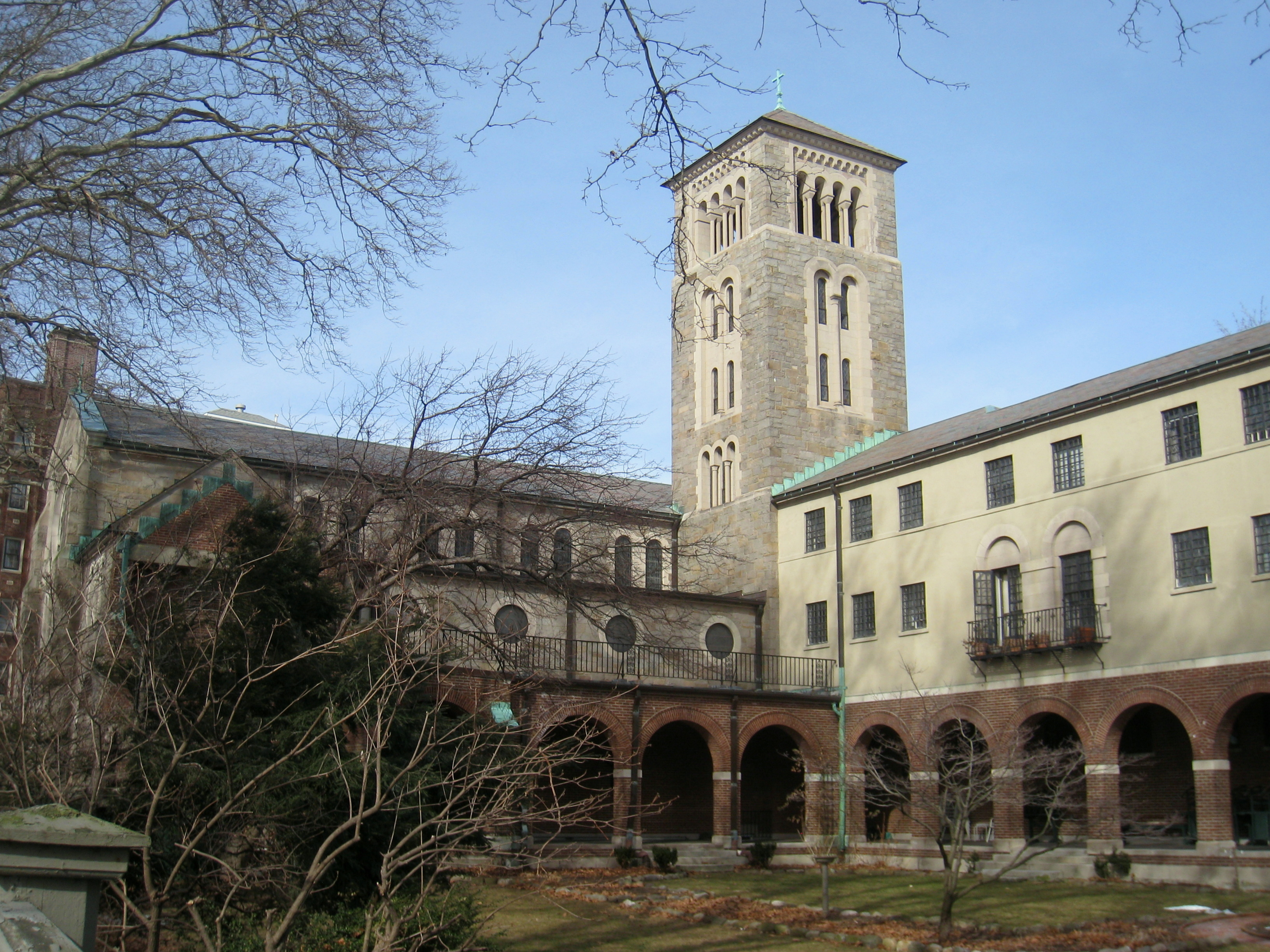

- Location within Massachusetts Location within the United States
- Location: 980 Memorial Dr., Cambridge, Massachusetts
- Coordinates: 42°22′20″N 71°7′29″W
- Built: 1936
- Architect: Cram & Ferguson
- Architectural style: Romanesque
- MPS: Cambridge MRA
- NRHP reference No.: 82001933
- Added to NRHP: April 13, 1982

The Conventual Church of St. Mary and St. John is a historic Episcopal church in Cambridge, Massachusetts. The Romanesque Revival church was built in 1936 to a design by architect Ralph Adams Cram. Cram sought to reproduce 12th century ecclesiastical forms found in the Burgundy region of France. The building was featured in a 1941 architectural magazine. It is home to monks of the Society of Saint John the Evangelist of the Episcopal Church.

The church was listed on the National Register of Historic Places in 1982.

== See also ==
- National Register of Historic Places listings in Cambridge, Massachusetts
