= House of Hope Presbyterian Church =

Church in Minnesota, United States

Coordinates: 44.9419°N 93.1329°W

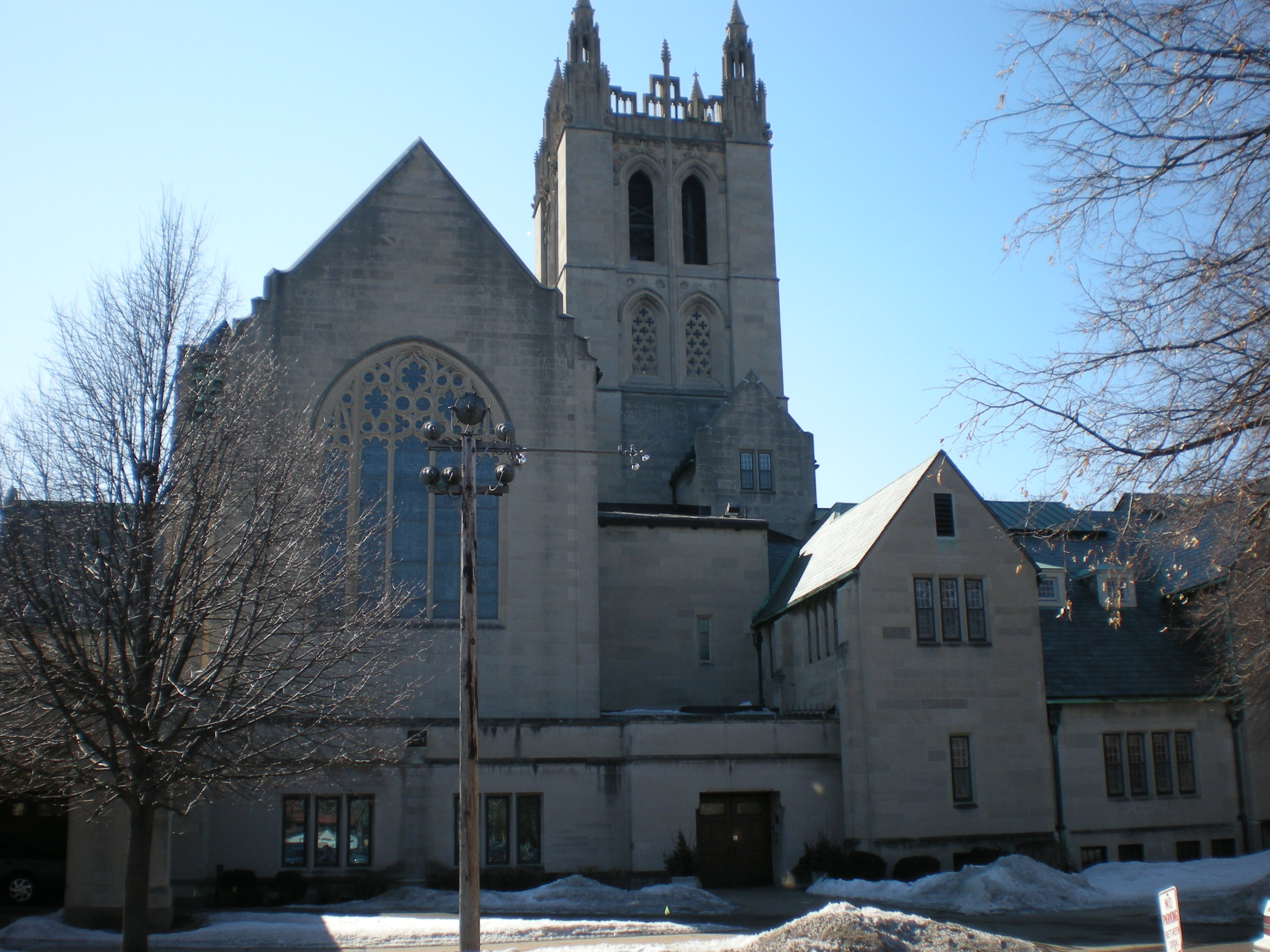
The church in 2012

The House of Hope Presbyterian Church is a Presbyterian church on Summit Avenue in Saint Paul, Minnesota. House of Hope's congregation was formed from the merging of two Presbyterian churches, First Church (1849) and House of Hope (1855), which were both founded by Philadelphia-born missionary and educator Edward Duffield Neill.

Its cruciform building was designed by noted architect Ralph Adams Cram starting in 1914. It is a Gothic Revival building built in sandstone, with an extensive stained glass program. An elaborate neogothic wheel chandelier hangs over the entrance to the apse and the sanctuary houses two organs. The church complex also features a school building and a cloister.

The church was expanded in 1959. It received a 2014 St. Paul Heritage Preservation Award for completion of a major restoration of the church and its bell tower costing $3.2 million that including replacing the slate roof and adding copper flashings.
