= Ralph Adams Cram =

American architect (1863–1942)

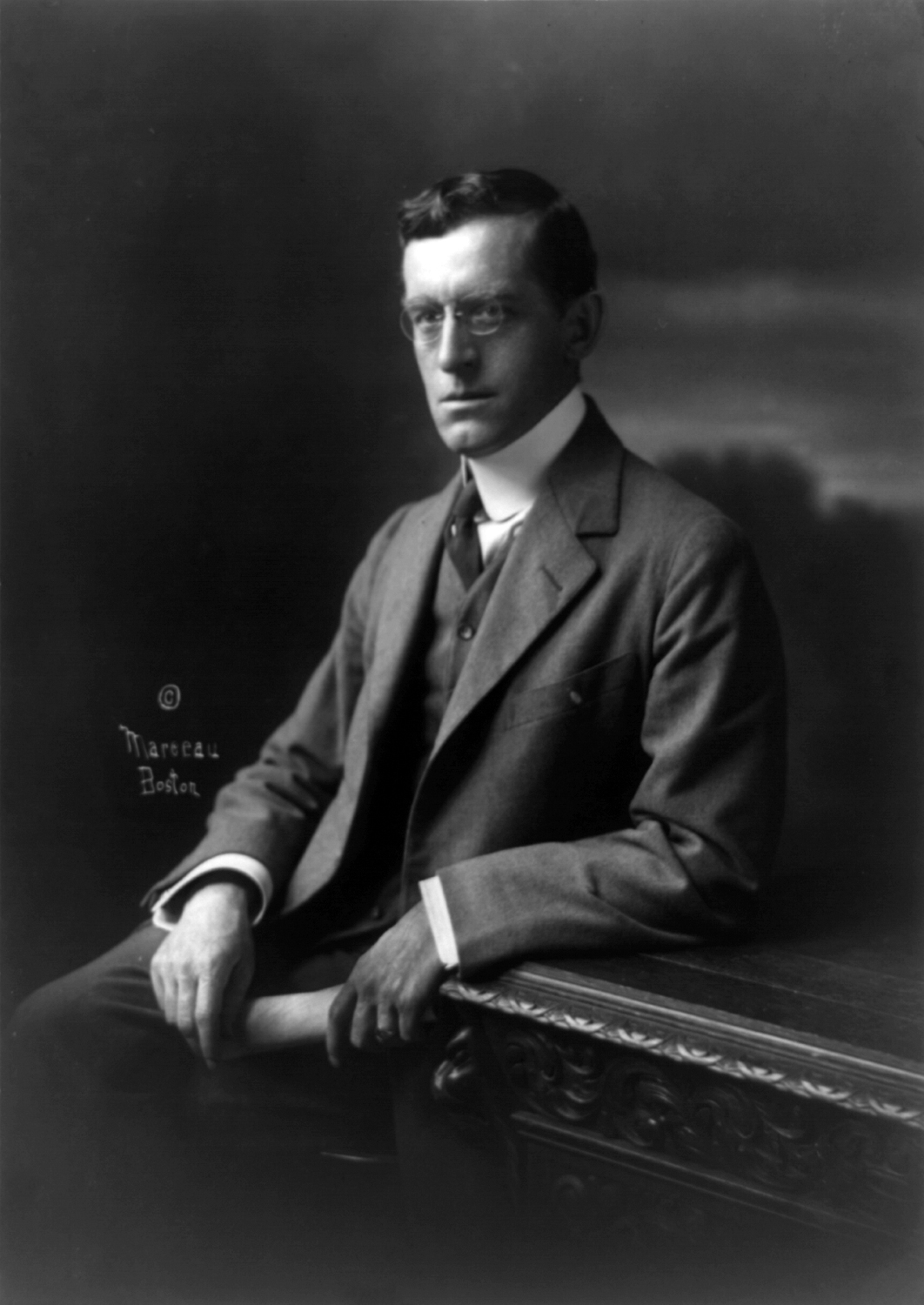
- Cram in 1911
- Born: December 16, 1863; Hampton Falls, New Hampshire, U.S.
- Died: September 22, 1942 (aged 78); Boston, Massachusetts, U.S.
- Education: Westford Academy; Phillips Exeter Academy
- Occupations: Architect; Writer
- Spouse: Elizabeth Carrington Read (m. 1900)

Ralph Adams Cram (December 16, 1863 – September 22, 1942) was a prolific and influential American architect of collegiate and ecclesiastical buildings, often in the Gothic Revival style. Cram & Ferguson and Cram, Goodhue & Ferguson are partnerships in which he worked. Cram was a fellow of the American Institute of Architects.

== Early life ==
Cram was born on December 16, 1863, at Hampton Falls, New Hampshire, to William Augustine Cram and Sarah Elizabeth (Blake) Cram. He was educated at Westford Academy and Phillips Exeter Academy. He was a cousin of Ralph Warren Cram.

At age 18, Cram moved to Boston in 1881 and worked for five years in the architectural office of Rotch & Tilden, after which he left for Rome to study classical architecture. From 1885 to 1887, he was art critic for the Boston Transcript. During an 1887 Christmas Eve Mass in Rome, he had a dramatic conversion experience. For the rest of his life, he practiced as a fervent Anglo-Catholic who identified as high-church Anglican. In the 1890s, Cram was a key figure in "social-controversial-inspirational" groups including the Pewter Mugs and the Visionists.

In 1900, Cram married Elizabeth Carrington Read at New Bedford, Massachusetts. She was the daughter of Clement Carrington Read and his wife. Read had served as a captain in the Confederate Army during the American Civil War. Elizabeth and Ralph had three children, Mary Carrington Cram, Ralph Wentworth Cram and Elizabeth Strudwick Cram. The family burial site is at the St. Elizabeth's Memorial Churchyard. The churchyard is adjacent to St Elizabeth's Chapel, which Cram designed, in Sudbury, Massachusetts, where he lived later in life.

== Career ==
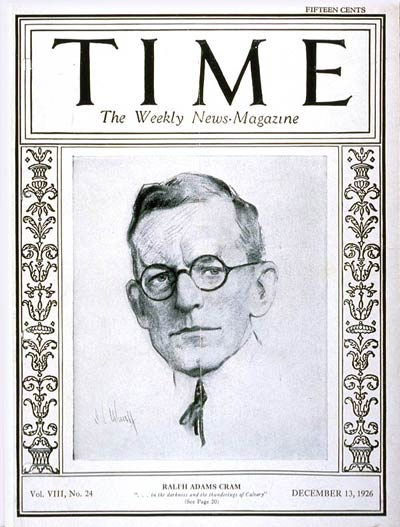
Cover of Time magazine (December 13, 1926)

Cram and business partner Charles Wentworth started business in Boston in April 1889 as Cram and Wentworth. They had landed only four or five church commissions before they were joined by Bertram Goodhue in 1892 to form Cram, Wentworth and Goodhue. Goodhue brought an award-winning commission in Dallas (never built) and brilliant drafting skills to the Boston office.

Wentworth died in 1897 and the firm's name changed to Cram, Goodhue & Ferguson to include draftsman Frank W. Ferguson (1861–1926). Cram and Goodhue complemented each other's strengths at first but began to compete, sometimes submitting two differing proposals for the same commission. The firm won design of the United States Military Academy at West Point in 1902, a major milestone in their career. They set up the firm's New York office, where Goodhue would preside, leaving Cram to operate in Boston. He designed the sanctuary for the First Unitarian Society in Newton which represents elements of his signature ecclesiastical style and was built in 1905. From 1907 to 1909, Cram was the editor of Christian Art.

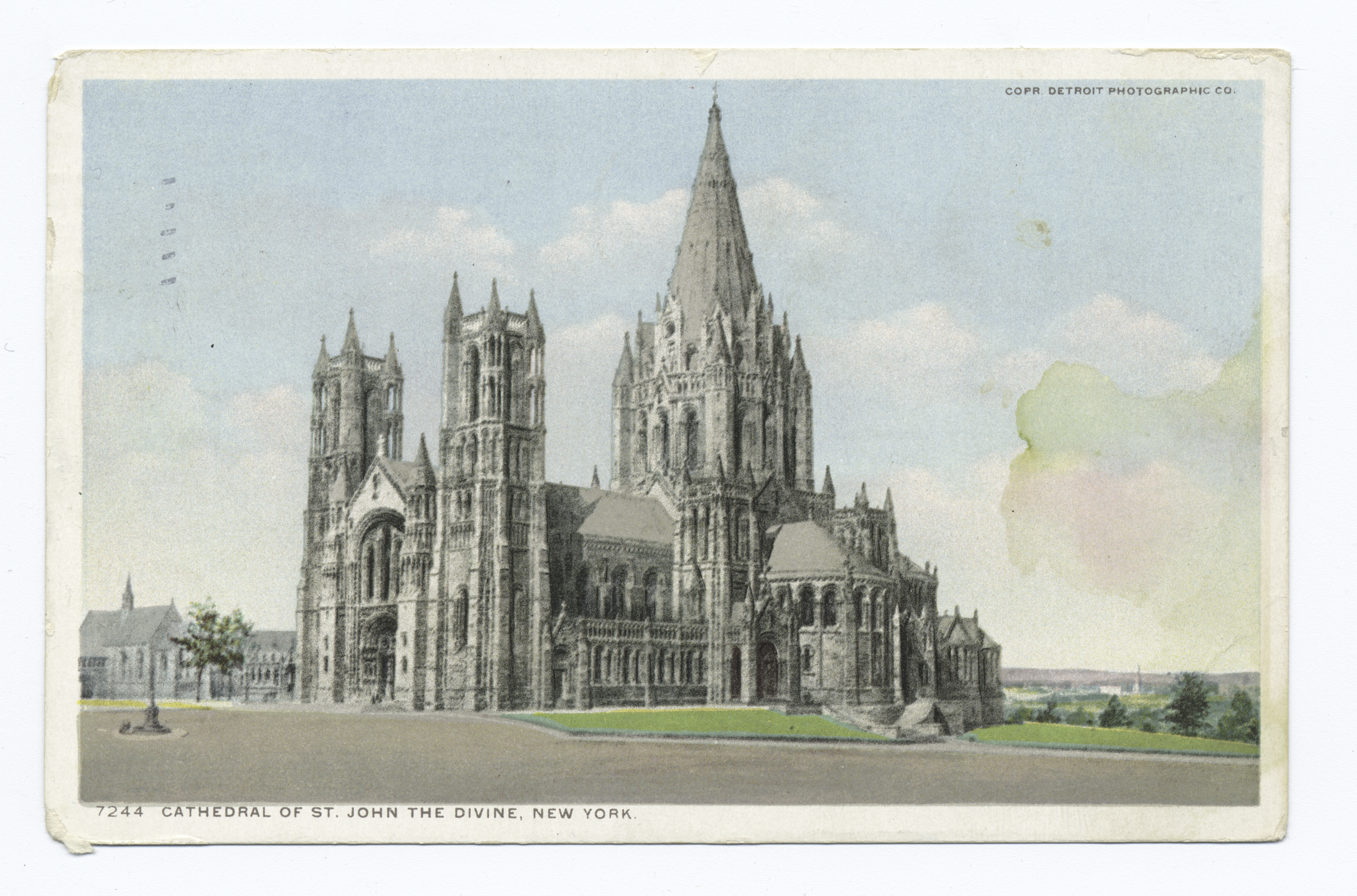
Original design: Cathedral of St. John the Divine, New York City. The tower over the crossing has never been completed.

Cram's acceptance of the Cathedral of St. John the Divine commission in New York City in 1911 (on Goodhue's perceived territory) heightened the tension between the two. Architectural historians have attributed most of their projects to one partner or the other, based on the visual and compositional style, and the location. The Gothic Revival Saint Thomas Church was designed by them both in 1914 on Manhattan's Fifth Avenue. It is the last example of their collaboration, and the most integrated and strongest example of their work together.

Goodhue began his solo career on August 14, 1913. Cram and Ferguson continued with major church and college commissions through the 1930s. Particularly important work includes the original campus of Rice University, Houston, as well as the library and first city hall of that city. Also notable is Cram's first church in the Boston area, All Saints, Dorchester. The successor firm is HDB/Cram and Ferguson of Boston.

One of Ralph Adams Cram’s lesser-known yet architecturally significant commissions is Sacred Heart Church in Jersey City, New Jersey, designed between 1922 and 1924. The church is a distinctive fusion of Spanish Gothic and Moorish architecture, reflecting Cram’s exploration of Iberian Gothic motifs. The building features intricate Samuel Yellin ironwork and stained glass windows designed by a young Harry Wright Goodhue, who was just 18 years old at the time. The church, originally built to serve a vibrant immigrant community, is considered an important example of Cram’s ecclesiastical designs outside of Boston. Although deconsecrated, it remains an architectural landmark and is currently undergoing restoration as part of a broader redevelopment of the Sacred Heart campus.

A leading proponent of disciplined Gothic Revival architecture in general and Collegiate Gothic in particular, Cram is most closely associated with Princeton University, where he served as supervising architect from 1907 to 1929, during a period of major construction. The university awarded him a Doctor of Letters for his achievements. In 1907, he served as chairman of the American Institute of Architects' Committee on Education.

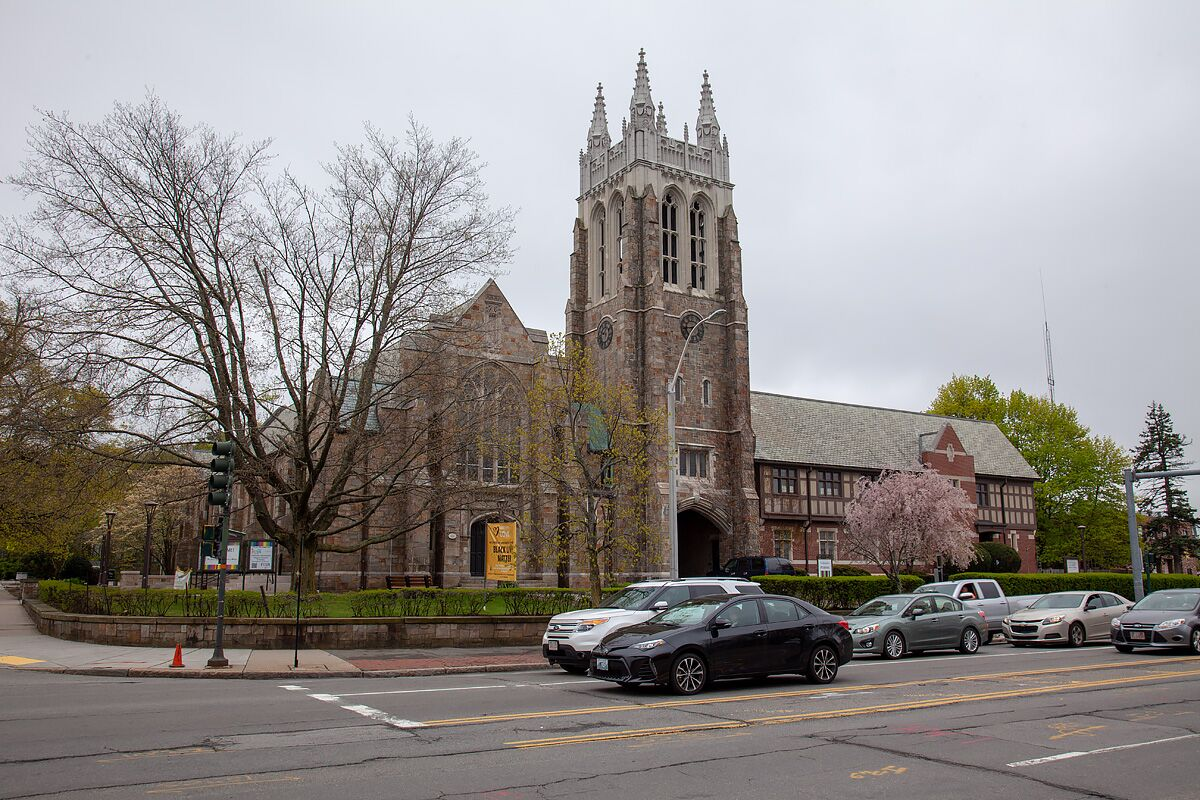
First Unitarian Society of Newton, Massachusetts (1905)

For seven years he headed the Architectural Department at Massachusetts Institute of Technology. Through the 1920s, Cram was a public figure and frequently mentioned in the press. The New York Times called him "one of the most prominent Episcopalian laymen in the country". His work was part of the architecture event in the art competition at the 1928 Summer Olympics.

He made news with his defense of Al Smith during his electoral campaign, when anti-Catholic rhetoric was used, saying "I... express my disgust at the ignorance and superstition now rampant and in order that I may go on record as another of those who, though not Roman Catholics, are nevertheless Americans and are outraged by this recrudescence of blatant bigotry, operating through the most cowardly and contemptible methods."

In around 1932, he designed the Desloge Chapel in St. Louis, MO, the Gothic chapel designed to echo the contours of the St. Chapelle in Paris. Desloge Chapel, which is associated with the Firmin Desloge Hospital and St. Louis University, in 1983, was declared a landmark by the Missouri Historical Society. In 1938, he was elected into the National Academy of Design as an Associate Academician. He died in Boston Massachusetts on September 22 1942 of a cerebral hemorrhage at 78.

== Views ==
=== Modernism ===
As an author, lecturer, and architect, Cram propounded the view that the Renaissance had been, at least in part, an unfortunate detour for western culture. Cram argued that authentic development could come only by returning to Gothic sources for inspiration, as his "Collegiate Gothic" architecture did, with considerable success. For his Rice University buildings, he favored a medieval north Italian Romanesque style, more in keeping with Houston's hot, humid climate.

A modernist in many ways, he designed Art Deco landmarks of great distinction, including the Federal Building skyscraper in Boston and numerous churches. For example, his design of the tower of the East Liberty Presbyterian Church, Pittsburgh, was inspired by the Empire State Building. His work at Rice was as modernist as medieval in inspiration. His administration building, his secular masterwork, has been compared by Shand-Tucci to Frank Lloyd Wright's work, particularly in the way its dramatic horizontality reflects the surrounding prairies.

The architectural historian Sandy Isenstadt wrote in a review of Cram's biography that "... (modernist) disdain (of Cram) turned out to be modernism's loss". Peter Cormack, director of London's William Morris Gallery, said regarding the critical neglect of Cram's work that it was "a phenomenon which has significantly distorted the study of America's modern architectural history... (Cram) deserves the same kind of international--and domestic--recognition accorded (all too often uncritically) to his contemporary Frank Lloyd Wright".

=== Politics ===
Cram argued that the United States would be better off under a Semi-constitutional monarchy, with the right to vote restricted to white men who owned a sufficient level of property. He lays out some of his monarchist beliefs in his work Invitation to Monarchy, which appeared in The American Mercury in 1936.

=== Religion ===
Raised Unitarian, Cram converted to Anglo-Catholicism after a youthful visit to Rome. He later joined The Episcopal Church in the United States upon returning to his home country. Throughout his life, Cram was devoted to liturgical and devotional practices revived by Anglo-Catholicism, including the cultus of King Charles the Martyr. He, along with other Anglo-Catholics, viewed Anglicanism as a "branch" of the one true Church, alongside the Roman Catholicism and Eastern Orthodoxy, and hoped for eventual unification with Rome.

Cram also co-founded the American branches of the Society of King Charles the Martyr and the Order of the White Rose. Traveling through Europe, Cram also befriended Catholic writers Hilaire Belloc and G. K. Chesterton, who have been credited with influencing his views. He later became involved with a number of American Roman Catholic enterprises and co-founded the Catholic magazine Commonweal. Cram accepted papal primacy and frequently defended Catholicism against American anti-Catholic prejudice, though he never converted to the Roman Catholic Church.

== Selected works ==
=== Residences ===
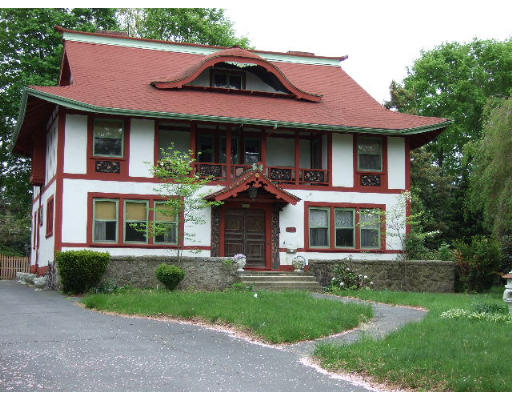
House of the Rising Sun, Fall River, Massachusetts, c. 1890

- The Birches, Garrison, New York, 1882
- Moonstone Cottage, 559 York Street, York Harbor, Maine, 1889
- House of the Rising Sun, 657 Highland Avenue, Fall River, Massachusetts, c.1890. Designed for Unitarian missionary Reverend Arthur May Knapp (1841–1921), it was inspired by a Japanese Pagoda.
- Rehoboth, Chappaqua, New York, 1891–92
- Richmond Court, Brookline, Massachusetts, 1896
- Watkins Manor House, Winona, Minnesota, 1924–27
- Standish Mansion, Grosse Pointe Shores, Michigan, 1934

=== Churches and religious buildings ===
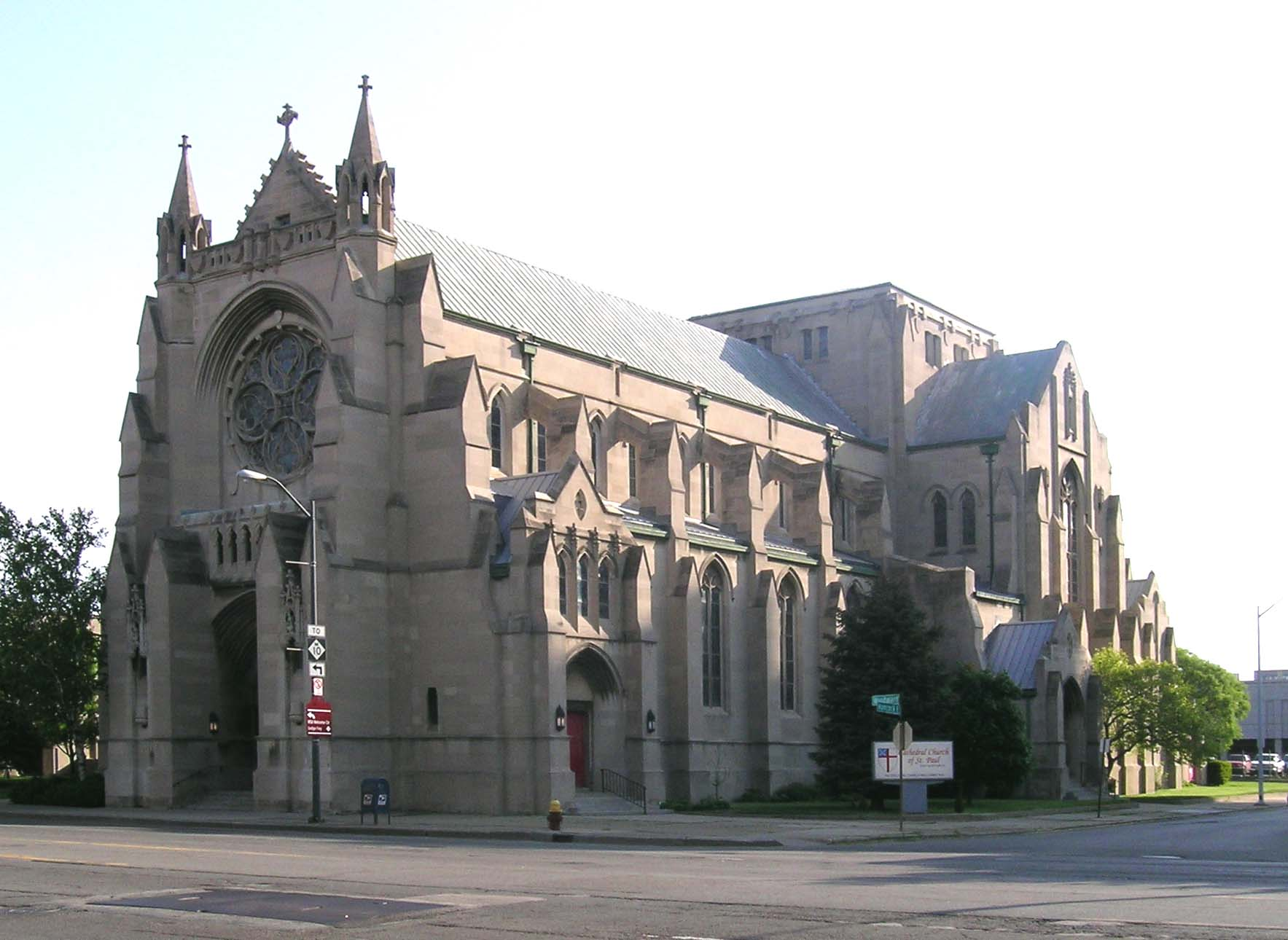
Cathedral Church of St. Paul, Detroit, 1908

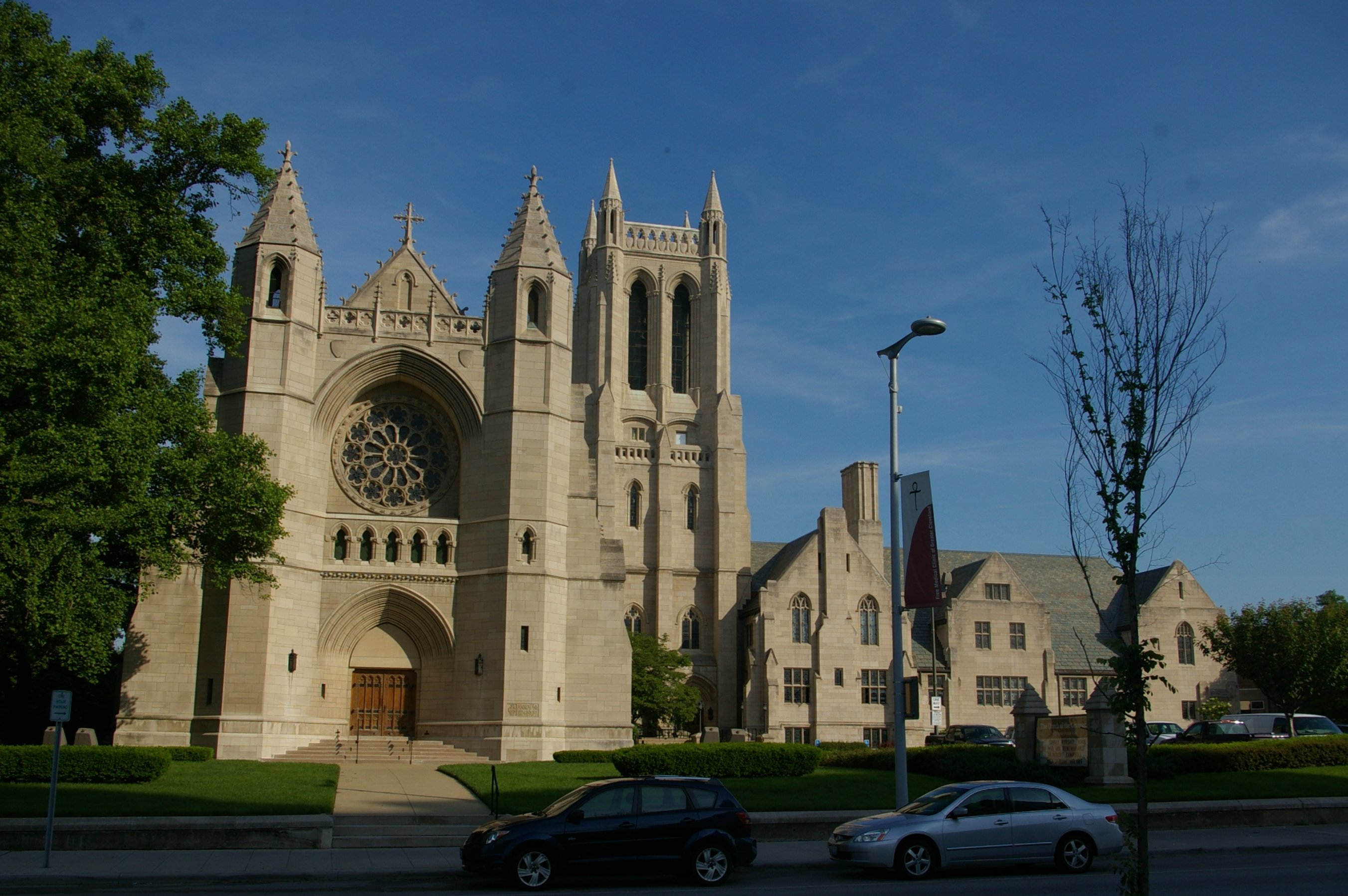
Church of the Covenant in the University Circle neighborhood of Cleveland, 1911

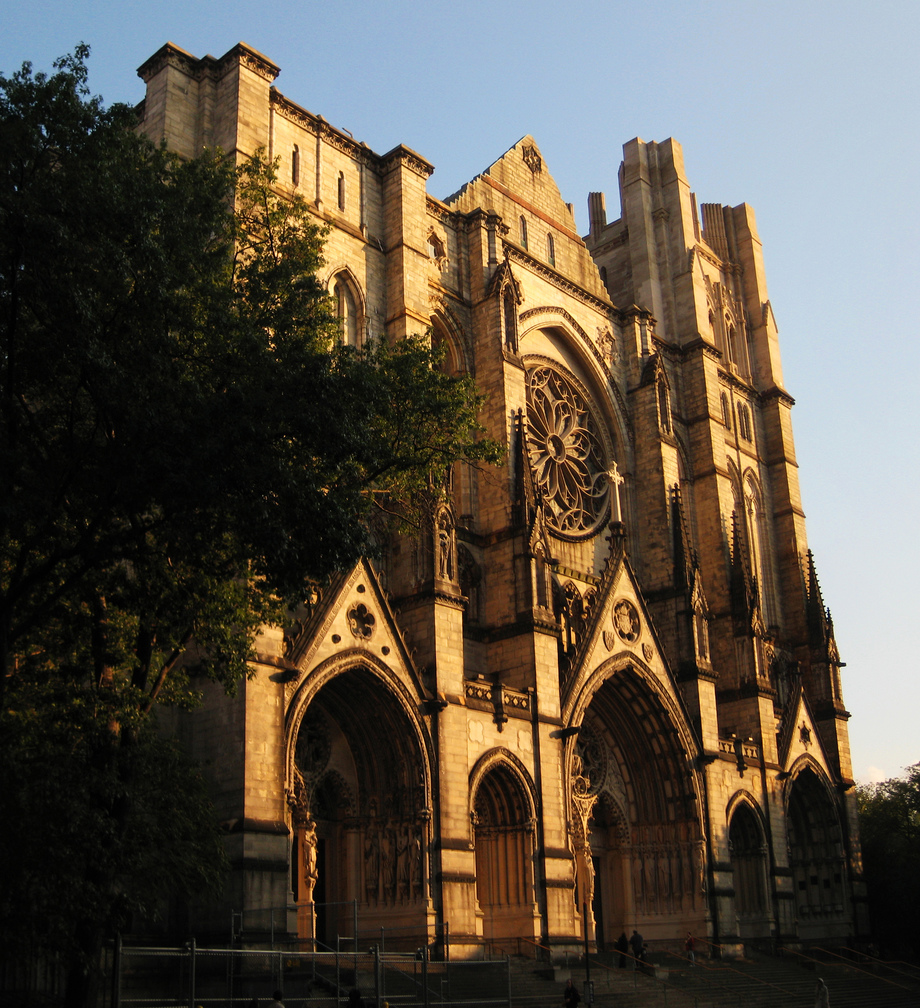
Cathedral of St. John the Divine, New York City; design taken over by Cram in 1911

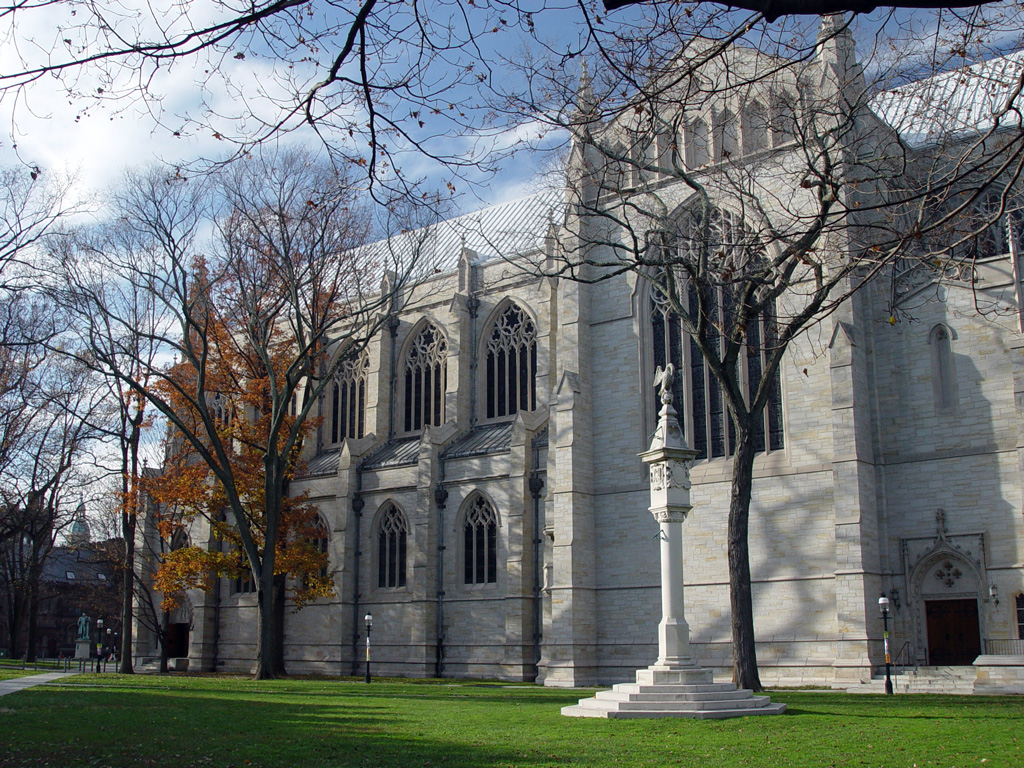
Princeton University Chapel, 1928

- All Saints' Church, Ashmont, Massachusetts, 1892
- Christ Church, Hyde Park, Massachusetts 1892
- Church of St. John the Evangelist, Boston, Massachusetts, 1892
- Lady Chapel, Church of the Advent, Boston, Massachusetts, 1894
- Phillips Church, Exeter, New Hampshire, 1897
- All Saints Parish, Brookline, Massachusetts, 1898
- Emmanuel Church, Newport, Rhode Island, 1900
- Calvary Episcopal Church, Pittsburgh, Pennsylvania, 1904
- Holy Cross Monastery, West Park, New York, with Henry Vaughan, 1904
- All Saints' Chapel, Sewanee: The University of the South, Sewanee, Tennessee, begun 1904, completed 1959
- La Santisima Trinidad pro-cathedral, Havana, Cuba, 1905
- Saint Thomas Church, New York City, 1905–13
- First Unitarian Society, Newton, Massachusetts, 1905–06
- Westminster Presbyterian Church, Springfield, Illinois, 1906
- St. Andrew's Episcopal Church, Denver, CO, 1907
- Cathedral Church of Saint Paul, Detroit, Michigan, 1908
- St. Philip's Church, Durham, North Carolina, 1908
- Trinity United Methodist Church, Durham, North Carolina, 1924
- Russell Sage Memorial Church, Far Rockaway, New York, 1908–10
- House of Hope Presbyterian Church, St. Paul, Minnesota, 1909–14
- St. Florian Church, Hamtramck, Michigan, 1910, expanded by Cram 1928
- All Saints Cathedral, Halifax, Nova Scotia, 1910
- Park Avenue Christian Church, New York City, 1911
- Church of the Covenant in the University Circle neighborhood of Cleveland, Ohio, 1911
- Cathedral of St. John the Divine, New York City, design taken over by Cram in 1911, unfinished
- All Souls Congregational Church, Bangor, Maine, 1912
- remodeling of Richard Upjohn's Grace Church, Providence, Rhode Island, 1912
- Saint Paul's Episcopal Parish, Malden, Massachusetts, begun 1913, unfinished
- Fourth Presbyterian Church, Chicago, Illinois, 1914
- Nave extension and Lady Chapel of Trinity Church, Princeton, Princeton, New Jersey, 1914.
- Chapel of St. Anne, Arlington, Massachusetts, 1915
- Sacred Heart Cathedral, Dodge City, Kansas (1916)
- All Saints Church, Peterborough, New Hampshire, ca 1916–20
- First Universalist Church, Somerville, Massachusetts, 1916–23
- Chapel of Mercersburg Academy, Mercersburg, Pennsylvania, 1916–28
- Cole Memorial Chapel, Wheaton College, Norton, Massachusetts, 1917
- Trinity Episcopal Church, Houston, Texas, 1919
- Calvary Episcopal Church, Americus, Georgia 1919–21
- St. Mark's Episcopal Pro-Cathedral, Hastings, Nebraska, 1921–29
- Saint James Church, Lake Delaware, New York, 1922.
- Second Presbyterian Church, Lexington, Kentucky 1922
- The First Presbyterian Church, Tacoma, Washington, 1923
- Sacred Heart Church, Jersey City, New Jersey, 1923
- St. James' Episcopal Church, New York City, rebuilt, 1924
- First Presbyterian Church, Utica, New York, 1924
- Pine Street Presbyterian Church, Harrisburg, Pennsylvania, 1926
- Westminster Presbyterian Church, Dayton, Ohio 1926
- First Presbyterian Church, Lincoln, Nebraska, 1925–27
- Chapel at St. George's School, Newport, Rhode Island, 1928
- Holy Rosary Roman Catholic Church, Pittsburgh, Pennsylvania, 1928
- First Presbyterian Church, Glens Falls, New York, 1928
- St. Paul's Episcopal Church, Winston-Salem, North Carolina, 1928
- Concordia Lutheran Church, Louisville, Kentucky, 1930
- Knowles Memorial Chapel, on the campus of Rollins College, Winter Park, Florida, 1931–32
- Christ Church United Methodist, New York City, 1931–33
- Chancel, Brown Memorial Presbyterian Church, Baltimore, Maryland, 1931
- Cathedral of Hope, Pittsburgh, Pennsylvania, 1932–35
- Christ Episcopal Church tower addition, Blacksburg Historic District, Blacksburg, Virginia, 1934
- Conventual Church of St. Mary and St. John, Cambridge, Massachusetts, 1936
- Monastery and chapel at the Society of St. John the Evangelist, Cambridge, Massachusetts, 1936
- All Saints Episcopal Church, Winter Park, Florida, 1941

=== Libraries & academic buildings ===
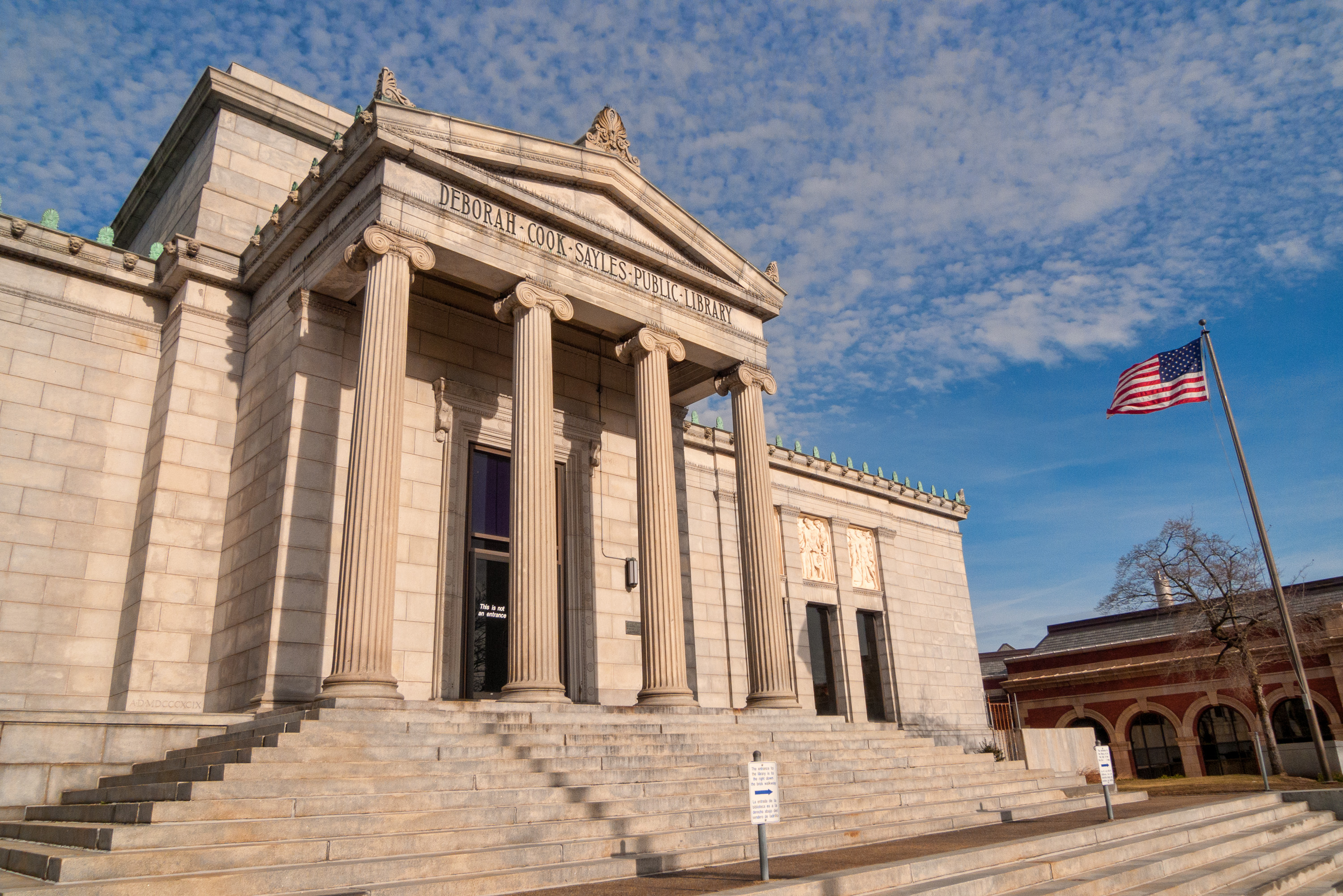
Sayles Memorial Library in Pawtucket, Rhode Island, 1902

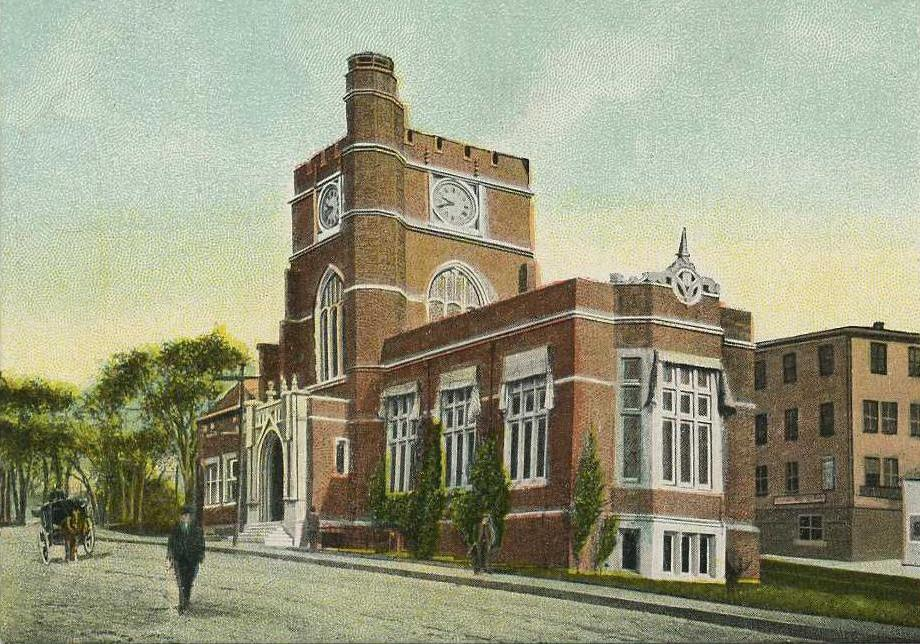
Hunt Memorial Library, Nashua, New Hampshire, c. 1906

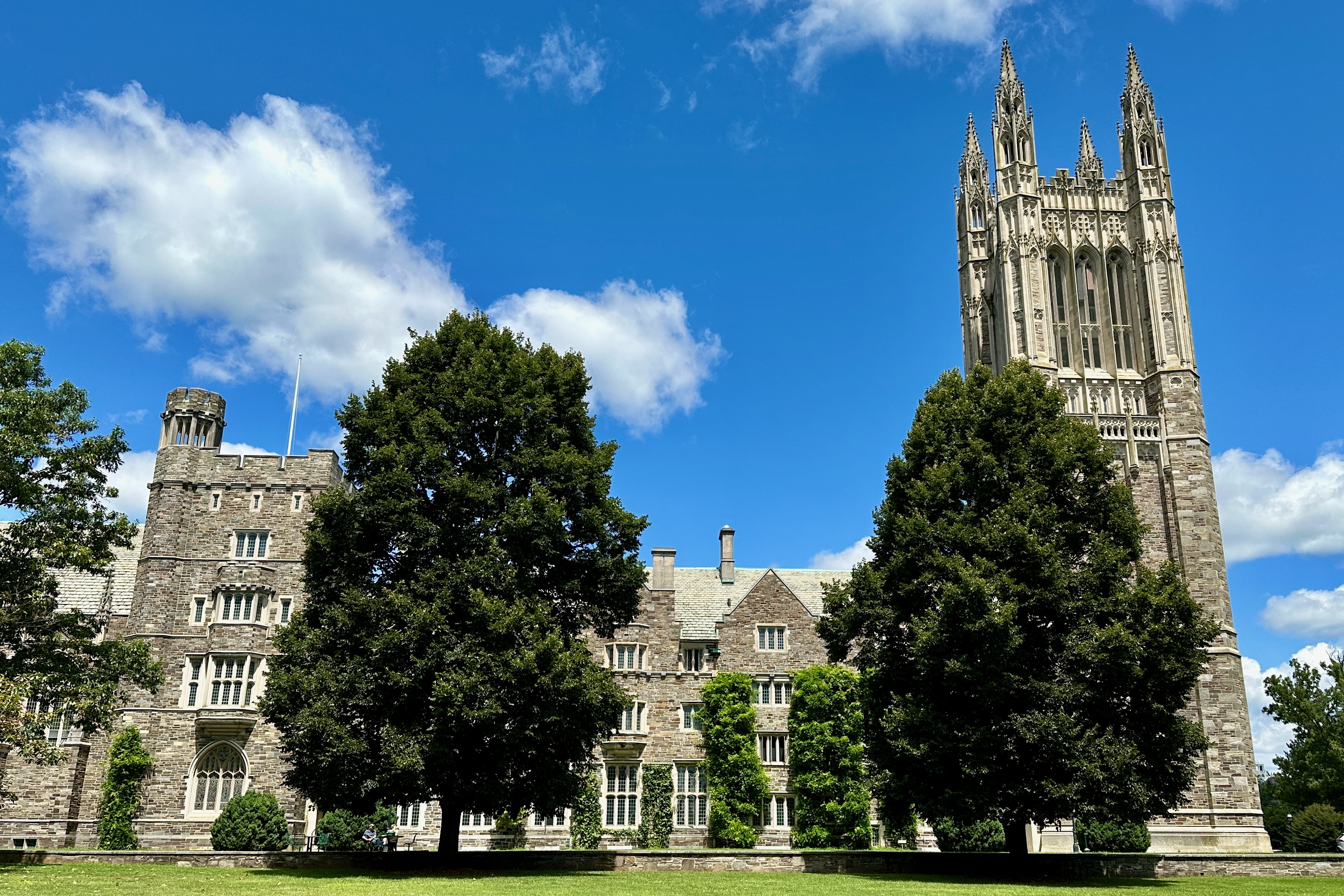
Princeton University Graduate College, 1913

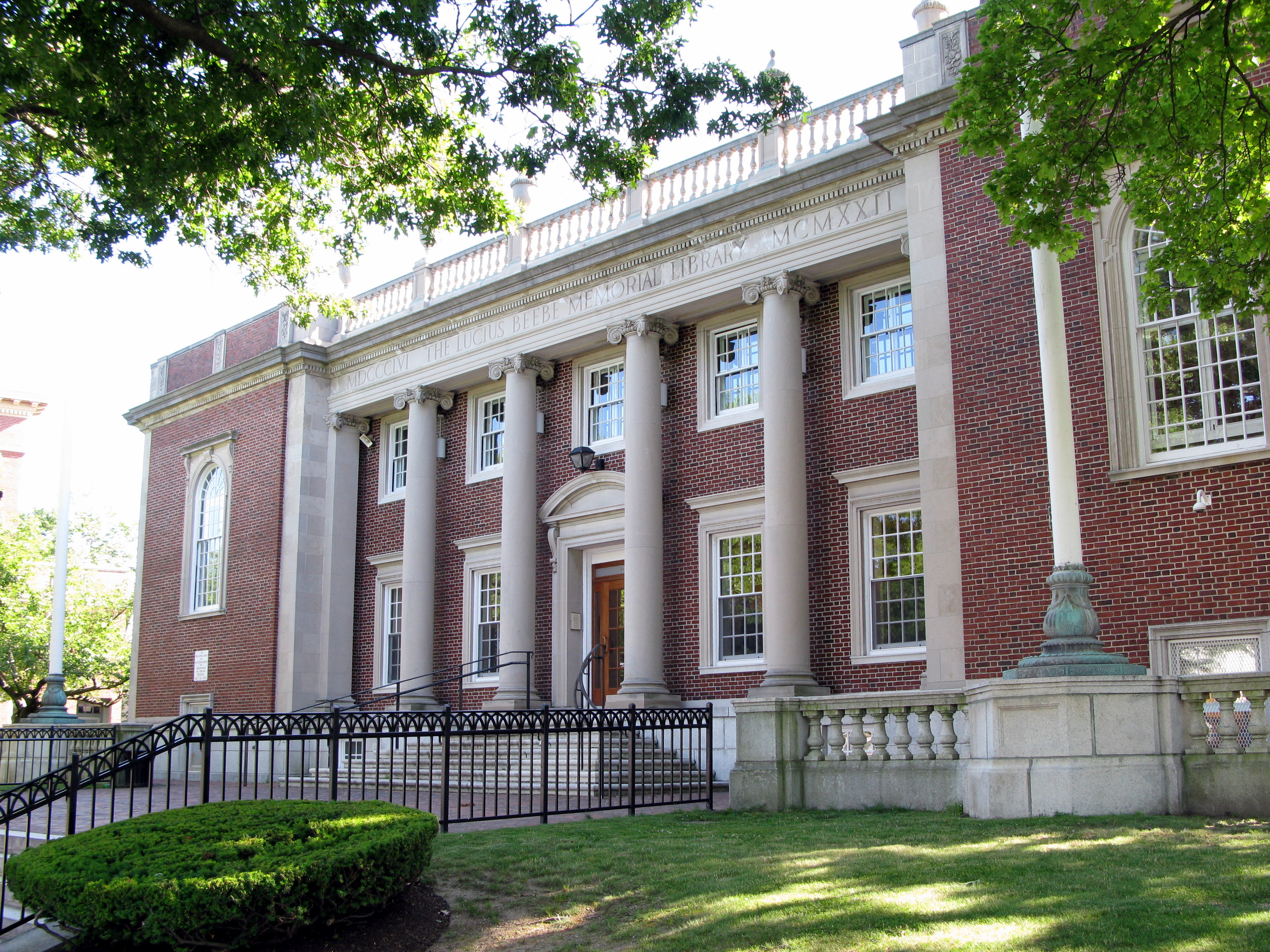
Lucius Beebe Memorial Library, Wakefield, Massachusetts, 1922

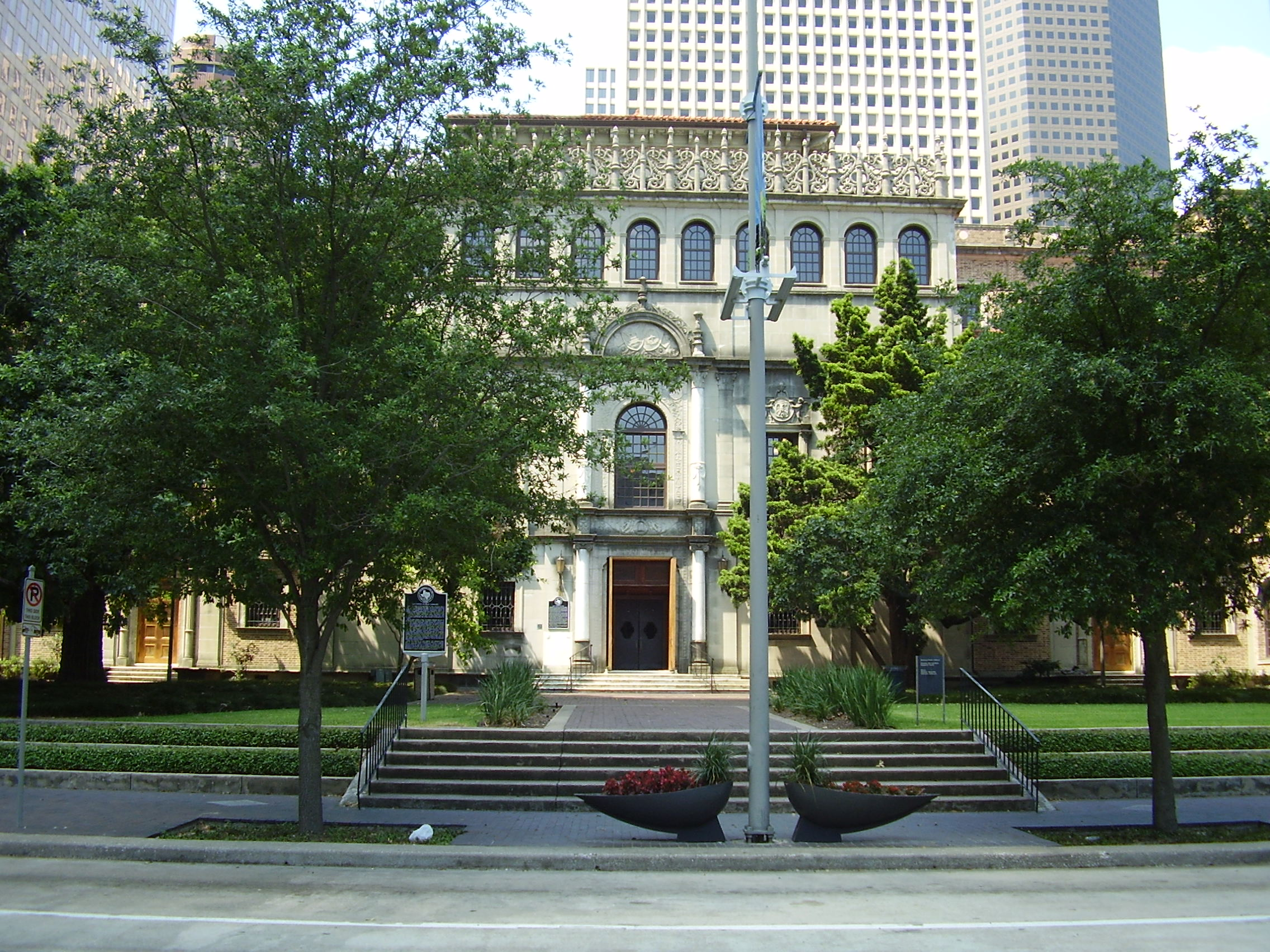
Julia Ideson Building, Houston Public Library, Houston, Texas, 1926

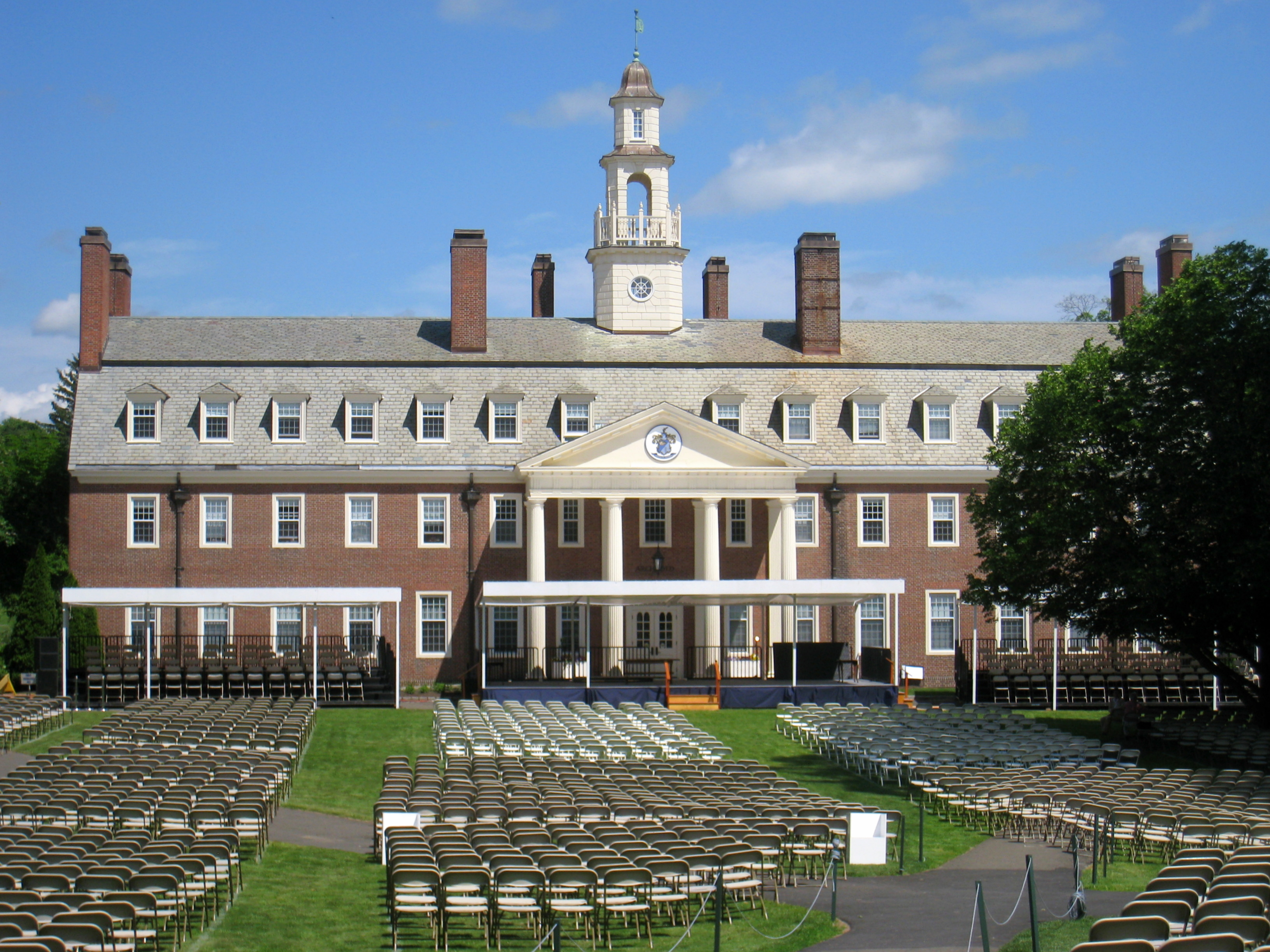
Archbold Infirmary, The Choate School, Wallingford, Connecticut, 1928

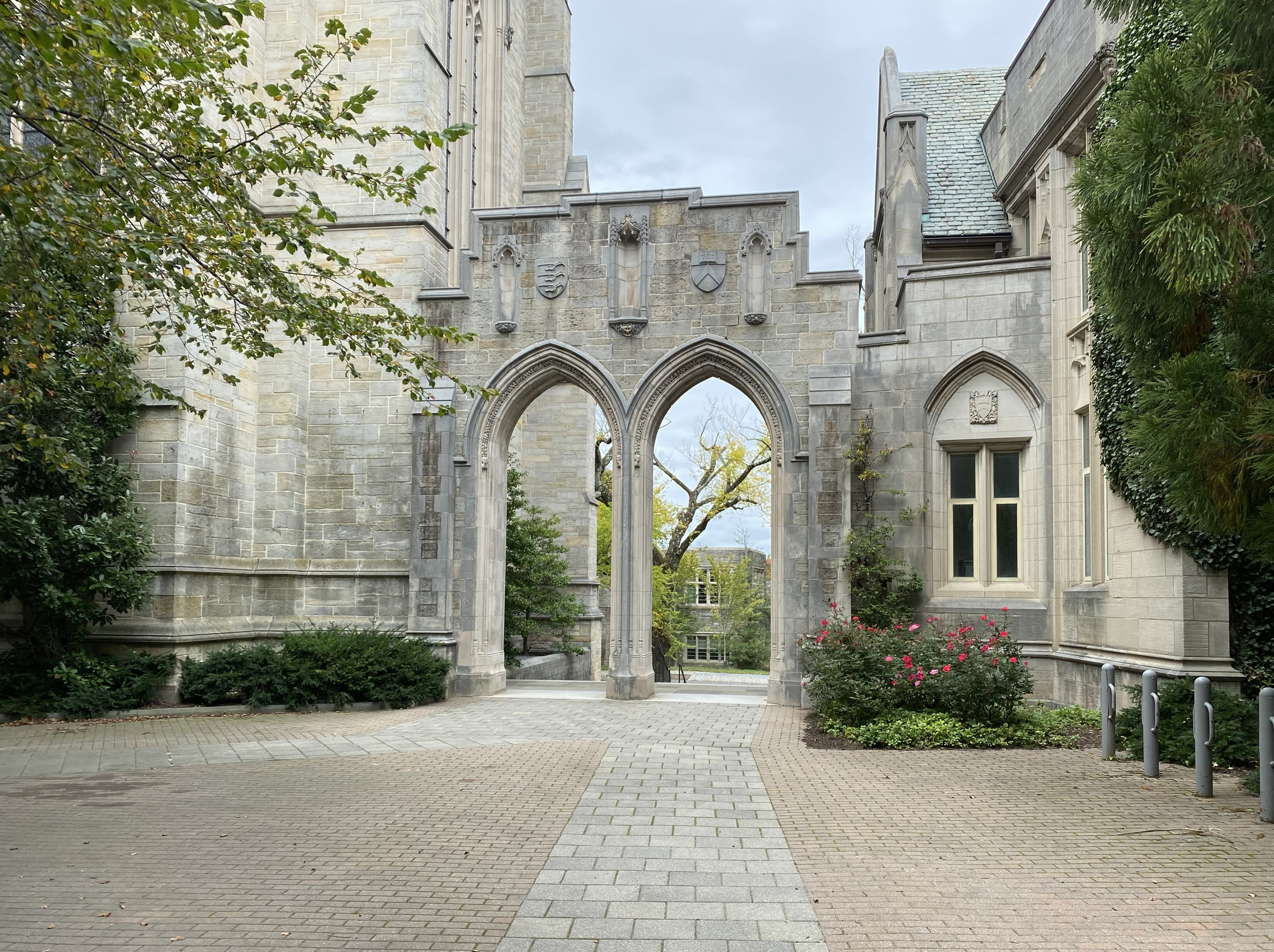
Rothschild Memorial Archway, Princeton University, c. 1929–1930

- Public Library, Fall River, Massachusetts 1899
- Boston Public Library, Parker Hill Branch, Roxbury, Massachusetts 1931
- Deborah Cook Sayles Public Library, Pawtucket, Rhode Island, 1899
- The Mather School, Dorchester, Massachusetts, 1905
- Hunt Memorial Library, Nashua, New Hampshire, c.1906
- Sweet Briar College, Sweet Briar, Virginia, 1906–28
  - Mary K. Benedict Hall
  - Fletcher Hall
  - Mary Harley Student Health and Counseling Center
  - Mary Helen Cochran Library
- Masters Hall, The Masters School, Dobbs Ferry, New York, 1921
- Princeton University, Princeton, New Jersey, 1911–28
  - Princeton University Graduate College, 1911–13
  - Cleveland Tower, 1917
  - Princeton University Chapel, 1928
  - Rothschild Memorial Archway, 1929–1930
  - Campbell Hall
  - McCormick Hall
- University of Richmond, Richmond, Virginia, 1911–14
  - Ryland Hall,
  - Jeter Hall
  - North Court
- Williams College, Williamstown, Massachusetts, 1910–22
  - Chapin Hall
  - Stetson Hall
- Phillips Exeter Academy, Exeter, New Hampshire
  - Academy Building, 1914
  - other buildings
- Rice University, Houston, Texas, 1910–16
  - Lovett Hall (Administration Building)
  - Mechanical Laboratory
  - Campus master plan
- Lucius Beebe Memorial Library, Wakefield, Massachusetts, 1922
- The Choate School, Wallingford, Connecticut, 1924–28
  - St. Andrews Chapel (now Seymour St. John Chapel)
  - Archbold Infirmary, 1928 (now Archbold House)
- Julia Ideson Building of the Houston Public Library, Houston, Texas, 1926
- Lower School Building, St. Albans School, Washington, D.C., 1928
- Doheny Library, Campus of the University of Southern California, Los Angeles, 1931
- Bell Tower, Dwight Morrow High School, Englewood, New Jersey, 1932
- Saint Mary's Academy, Glens Falls, New York, 1932
- Wheaton College (Massachusetts), Upper Campus
- Sweet Briar College, Sweet Briar, Virginia, Campus
- South Dining Hall, University of Notre Dame, South Bend, Indiana, 1927

=== Other buildings ===
- Virginia War Memorial Carillon, Byrd Park, Richmond, Virginia, 1932
- U.S. Post Office and Courthouse aka J.W. McCormack Post Office and Courthouse, Boston, Massachusetts, 1933
- buildings at the Aisne-Marne American Cemetery and Memorial, Belleau, France, 1937
- buildings at the Oise-Aisne American Cemetery and Memorial, Fère-en-Tardenois, Aisne department, France, c. 1937
- New England Mutual Life Insurance Building, Boston, Massachusetts, 1941

=== Cram & Ferguson, after Cram's death ===
- John Hancock Building, Boston, Massachusetts, 1947
- Marsh Chapel of Boston University, Boston, Massachusetts, 1950
- St. Luke's Methodist Church (Monticello, Iowa), 1950

== Publications ==
Cram wrote numerous publications and books on issues in architecture and religious devotion. Titles include:

- Impressions of Japanese Architecture and the Allied Arts, The Baker & Taylor Company, 1905
- The Ruined Abbeys of Great Britain, James Potts & Company, New York, 1905
- The Heart of Europe, MacMillan & Co. London, 1916 325pgs.
- The Substance of Gothic, Marshall Jones Company, Boston, 1917
- Farm Houses Manor Houses Minor Chateaux Small Churches in Normandy and Brittany, The Architectural Book Publishing Company, Paul Wenzel and Maurice Krakow, 1917
- Sins Of The Fathers, Marshall Jones Company, Boston, 1918
- Gold, Frankincense, and Myrrh, 1919
- Walled Towns, Marshall Jones Company, Boston, 1919
- Towards the Great Peace, Marshall Jones Company, Boston, 1922
- Church Building: A Study of the Principles of Architecture in Their Relation to the Church, Marshall Jones Company, Boston, 1924
- American Church Building of Today, Architectural Book Publishing Company, 1929
- Convictions and Controversies, Marshall Jones Company, Boston, 1935
- My Life in Architecture, Little, Brown, and Company, Boston, 1936

Cram also wrote fiction. A number of his stories, notably "The Dead Valley", were published in a collection entitled Black Spirits and White (Stone & Kimball, 1895). The collection has been called "one of the undeniable classics of weird fiction". H. P. Lovecraft wrote, "In 'The Dead Valley' the eminent architect and mediævalist Ralph Adams Cram achieves a memorably potent degree of vague regional horror through subtleties of atmosphere and description." Henry S. Whitehead described Black Spirits and White as "a delightful rendition of several characteristic ghost stories."

== Professional memberships ==
Cram was a

- Fellow of the:
  - Boston Society of Architects.
  - American Institute of Architects.
  - North British Academy of Arts.
  - Royal Geographical Society of London.
  - American Academy of Arts and Sciences.
- Member of the:
  - American Federation of Arts.
  - Architectural Association of London.
- Member of the clubs
  - Puritan Club (Boston).
  - Century Association (New York).

== See also ==
- List of covers of Time magazine (1920s)
