= Rebecca Salsbury James =

American artist (1891–1968)

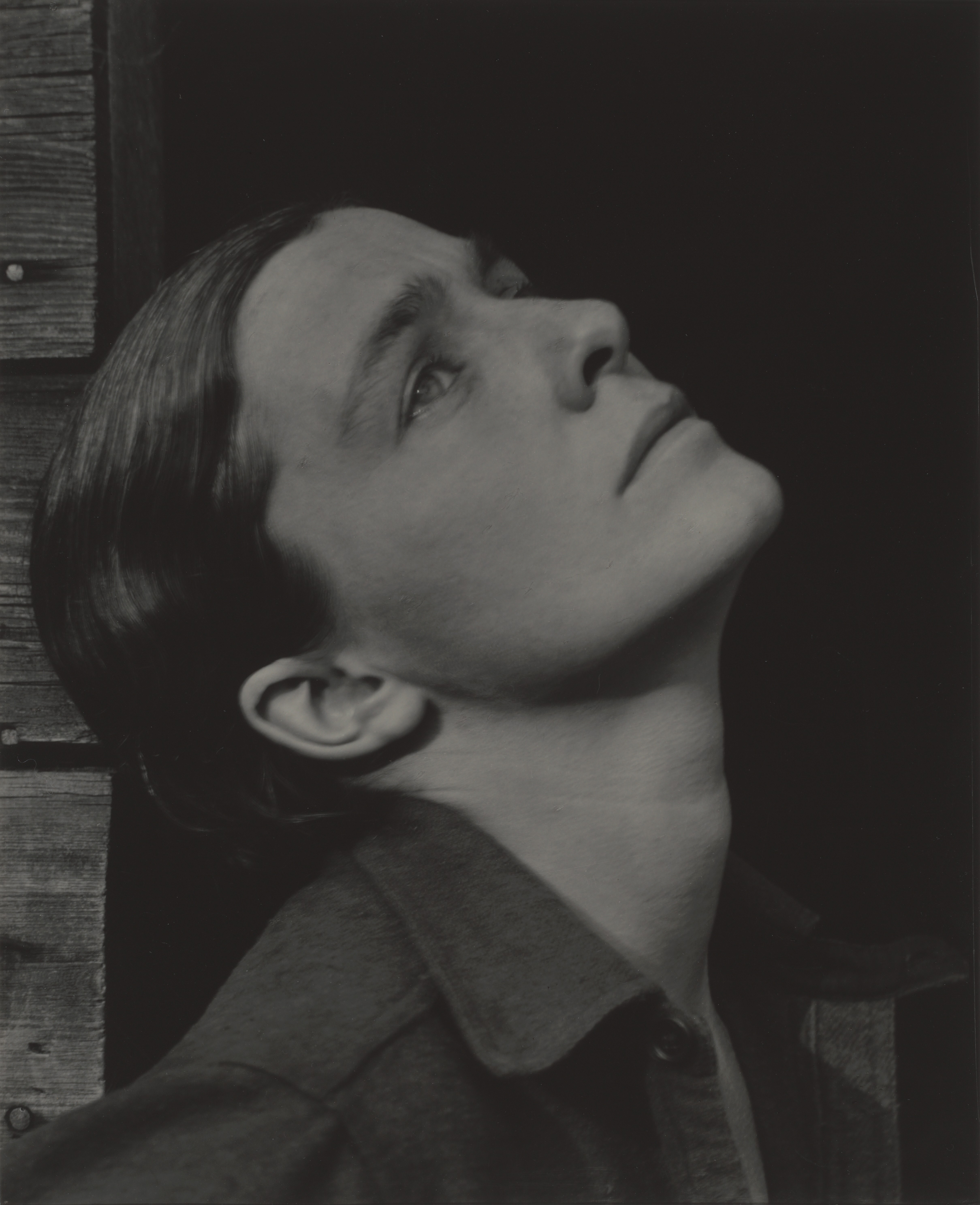
- Portrait by Alfred Stieglitz, 1922
- Born: Rebecca Salsbury; 21 December 1891; London, England
- Died: 8 July 1968 (aged 76); Taos, NM
- Education: Self taught
- Known for: Painting on glass, colcha embroidery
- Movement: Modernism
- Spouse(s): Paul Strand; Bill James
- Father: Nate Salsbury

Rebecca Salsbury James (1891–1968) was a self-taught American painter, born in London, England. Her American parents were in England for a Royal Command Performance before Queen Victoria and other nobility of Europe of Buffalo Bill's Wild West show. Rebecca's father, Nathan Salsbury 3rd, was producer and part owner of the show. She was raised in New York City, where she married photographer Paul Strand. Following her divorce from Strand, James moved to Taos, New Mexico where she fell in with a group that included Mabel Dodge Luhan, Dorothy Brett, and Frieda Lawrence. In 1937 she married William James, a businessman from Denver, Colorado who was then operating the Kit Carson Trading Company in Taos. She remained in Taos until her death in 1968.

James is noted for her "large scale flower blossoms and still lifes painted on glass." She also worked on colcha embroidery, a traditional Hispanic New Mexico craft style.

== Early life ==
Salsbury James was born to Rachel and Nate Salsbury. She had two older brothers, Nathan and Milton, and a twin sister, Rachel. She grew up on New York City’s Upper West Side. With her twin sister, Rachel, she attended the Ethical Culture School beginning in 1905. She was a member of the glee club and basketball team. In 1915, she was valedictorian of the Teacher’s College graduating class. In 1917, she and her brother Nate published A Book of Children’s Songs.

== In New York City and Taos ==
Rebecca Salsbury married photographer Paul Strand on January 21, 1922 in Manhattan. The two were active participants in the group of artists that showed their work at Alfred Stieglitz's galleries: 291, the Intimate Gallery, and An American Place. In addition to Stieglitz and Georgia O'Keeffe, the Strands were close to Marsden Hartley, Arthur Dove and Helen Torr, and Gaston and Isabel Lachaise.

In 1926, the Strands traveled to the west, visiting Mesa Verde National Park and cities including Denver, Santa Fe, and Taos. They had considered a European trip instead, but as Rebecca wrote to Paul, “Europe will still be there when we are middle-aged—we can still enjoy it—the West we should really see while we are young and sturdy—and that won’t last always.” Rebecca enjoyed the southwest, and Mabel Dodge Luhan's hospitality, so much that she wrote to Stieglitz and O’Keeffe, “She’s been so lovely … why she has been so kind to us we do not know. Except that she probably is to everybody. She does want you both to come sometime—Georgia should … she would do some great things—Georgia, do come some day.”

In 1929, Strand returned to New Mexico with O’Keeffe. The two stayed at Mabel Dodge Luhan’s compound in Taos, where Strand taught O’Keeffe to drive. The two painted throughout the summer. Strand and her husband returned to the southwest in 1930, 1931, and 1932. In 1933, the two divorced in Mexico and Rebecca returned to Taos, where she would marry businessman William James in 1937. In 1953 she published the book Allow Me to Present 18 Ladies and Gentlemen and Taos, N.M., 1885-1939.

== Art and exhibitions ==
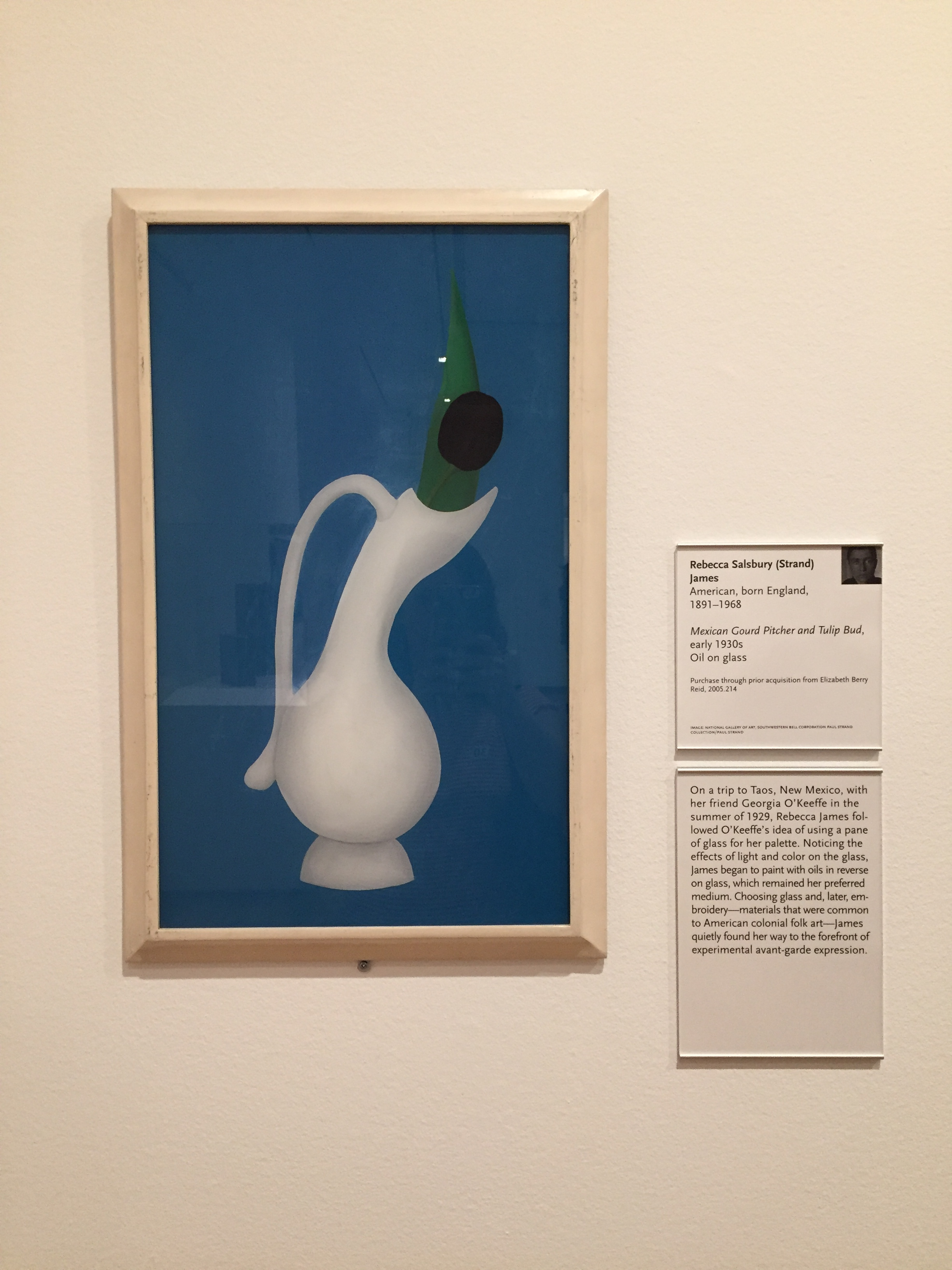
Rebecca Salsbury (Strand) James, Mexican Gourd Pitcher and Tulip Bud, early 1930s, oil on glass

James created artwork in pastel and charcoal, but for the majority of her career she worked primarily in the technique of reverse painting on glass. She also participated in the revival of the Spanish colonial colcha stitch, which she learned in the late 1930s from her friend and neighbor Jesusita Perrault. She wrote, "This versatile stitch, for me, has provided a creative means to make a statement with stitches. The living world about one—the skies, the land, people, grasses, trees—can be imbued with immediate life."

James took part in her first group exhibition at the Opportunity Gallery in New York City in 1928. She exhibited her paintings at the following institutions:

- An American Place (1932, 1936)
- Denver Art Museum, Chappell House (1933)
- New Mexico Museum of Art (1934)
- Colorado Springs Fine Arts Center (1939)
- Palace of the Legion of Honor (1951)
- Santa Barbara Museum of Art (1951)
- Martha Jackson Gallery (1954)

She showed her embroidery at:

- Palace of the Governors, Santa Fe (1952);
- Harwood Foundation, University of New Mexico (1952);
- Museum of International Folk Art (1963); and
- Currier Gallery of Art, New Hampshire (1964).

She also often participated in the annual exhibitions at the New Mexico Museum of Art in Santa Fe and the Harwood Foundation (now the Harwood Museum of Art) in Taos from the 1930s through the 1960s.

== Collections ==
James' works can be found in the following collections:

- The Corning Museum of Glass, Corning, New York
- Harwood Museum of Art, Taos, New Mexico
- New Mexico Museum of Art, Santa Fe, New Mexico
- University of New Mexico, University Art Museum, Albuquerque, New Mexico
- Taos Municipal Schools, Art Collection, Taos, New Mexico
- Taos Historic Museums, Blumenschein House, Taos, New Mexico
- Taos Health Systems, Holy Cross Hospital, Taos, New Mexico
- Philbrook Museum of Art, Tulsa, Oklahoma
- High Museum of Art, Atlanta, Georgia
- Harvard Art Museums, Cambridge
- Baltimore Museum of Art, Baltimore
- Colby College Museum of Art, Waterville, Maine
