= Princeton University Graduate College =

Residential college at Princeton University

Graduate College
- Residential college
- Princeton University
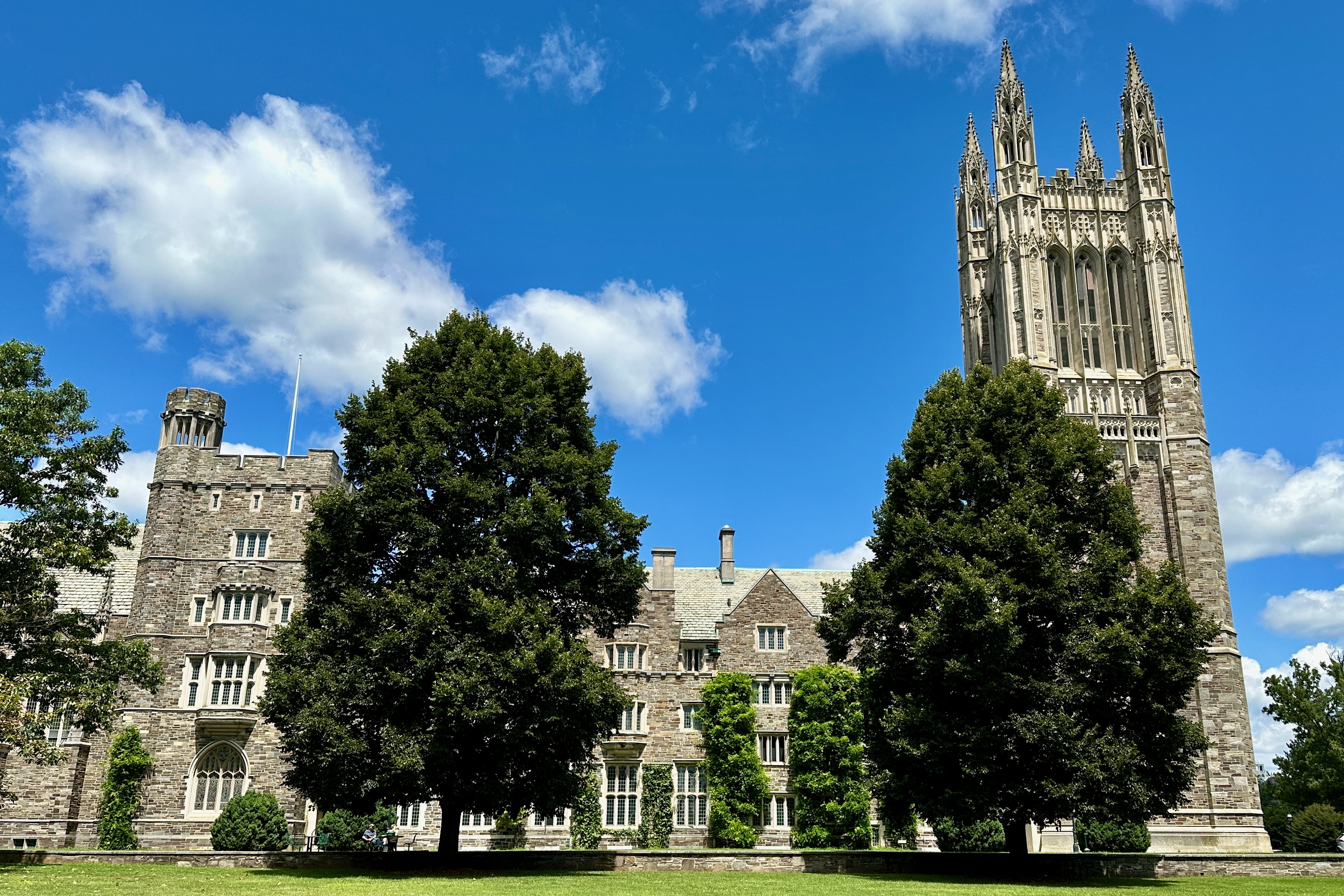
- Old Graduate College and Cleveland Tower

- Coordinates: 40°20′26.0″N 74°39′52.7″W
- Established: 1913
- Dean: Rodney Priestley
- Website: gradschool.princeton.edu/student-experience/residential-life/graduate-college
- Princeton University Graduate College
- U.S. Historic district – Contributing property
- Location within Mercer County, New Jersey Location within New Jersey Location within the United States
- Location: College Road, Princeton, NJ
- Built: 1913
- Architect: Ralph Adams Cram
- Architectural style: Collegiate Gothic
- Part of: Princeton Historic District (ID75001143)
- Designated CP: June 27. 1975

The Graduate College at Princeton University is a residential college which serves as the center of graduate student life at Princeton, separate from the seven undergraduate residential colleges. Wyman House, adjacent to the Graduate College, serves as the official residence of the current dean of the Graduate School.

Thomson College, the central quadrangle now commonly known as the Old Graduate College, is a memorial to United States senator John R. Thomson 1817 provided by a bequest left by his widow, Mrs. J. A. W. Thomson Swann, the Graduate College's first benefactor.

It was dedicated on October 22, 1913, during the tenure of the first dean of the Graduate School, Andrew Fleming West, and was the first residential college in the United States devoted solely to postgraduate liberal studies. The group of Collegiate Gothic buildings was designed by Ralph Adams Cram and located on a hill, one-half mile west of the main campus. Its most prominent architectural landmark is the 173-ft-high Cleveland Tower, which features one of the largest carillons in the United States. Cleveland Tower adjoins the Old Graduate College, which also includes Procter Hall, the Van Dyke Library, Pyne Tower, and North Court. In 1962, the New Graduate College was built to expand the Old Graduate College to the south-west, although it features a more modern architectural style. Colloquially, the Old Graduate College and New Graduate College are often simply referred to by their initials, "OGC" and "NGC", respectively.

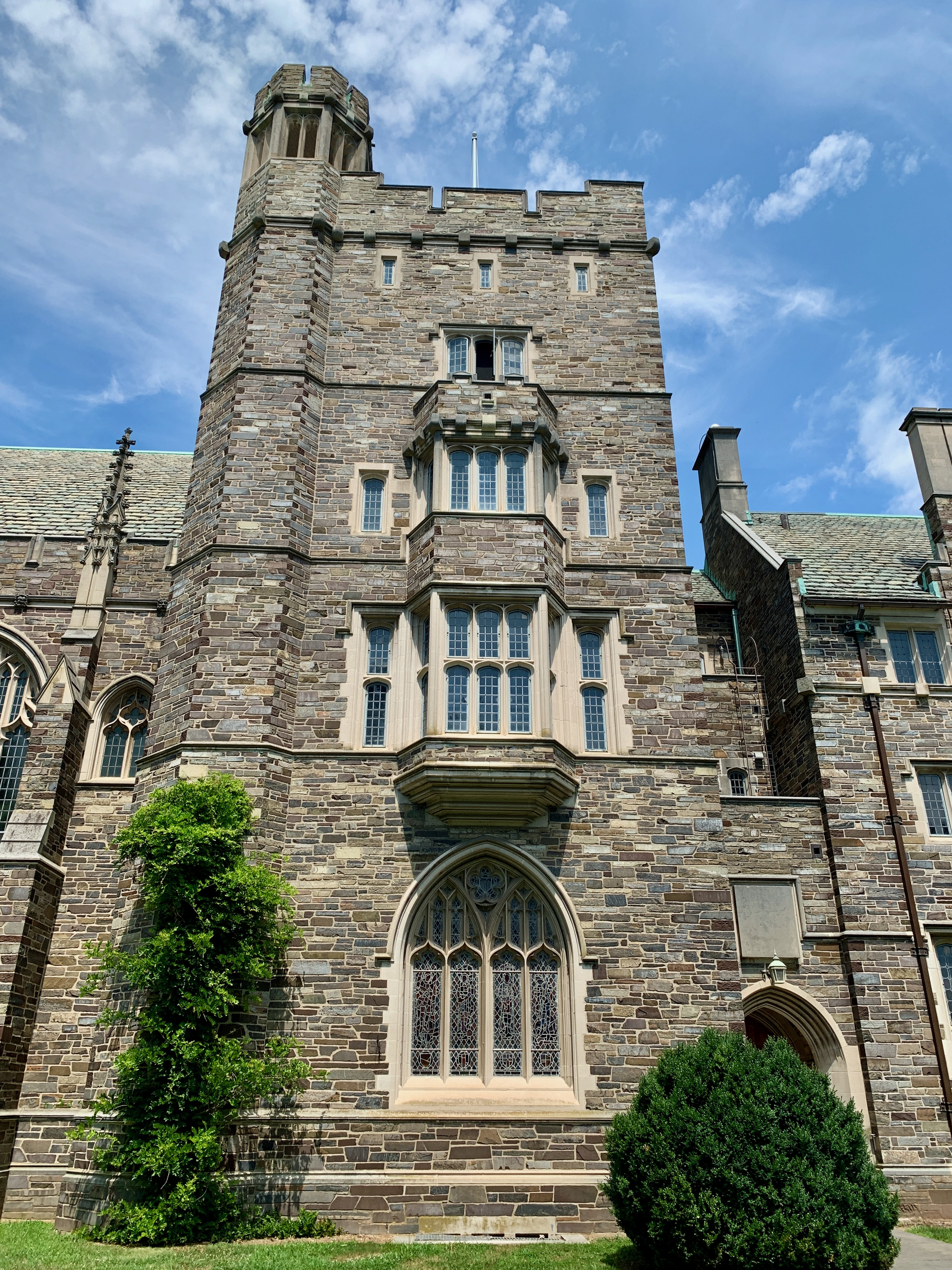
Pyne Tower

The Graduate College currently houses approximately 430 graduate students, mostly in their first-year of graduate study. The Graduate College's Pyne Tower is also the home of the current administrator in residence. It has been featured in the films Admission and Runner Runner.

== Proctor Hall ==
The westernmost portion of the Old Graduate College building houses Proctor Hall, a grand dining room named in honor of William Cooper Procter, the co-founder of Procter & Gamble, and a benefactor to the Graduate College's construction. It is an example of Collegiate Gothic architecture, and was given by Proctor in memory of his parents.

Proctor Hall serves as a dining hall for all Princeton graduate students, though students living at the Graduate College are required to purchase a meal plan, whereas this is optional for graduate students living elsewhere.

The western wall of the Hall is dominated by a large stained glass window titled the Seven Liberal Arts Window, designed by William and Annie Lee Willet. It depicts several different fields of study. Other, smaller, stained glass windows exist throughout the Hall's walls as well. An organ gallery overlooks the rest of the Hall from above its eastern entry.

== Art at the Graduate College ==
=== Sculptures ===
Along with the portraits and stained glass windows in Proctor Hall, the Graduate College hosts several sculptures on its grounds.

==== Floating Figure, Gaston Lachaise ====
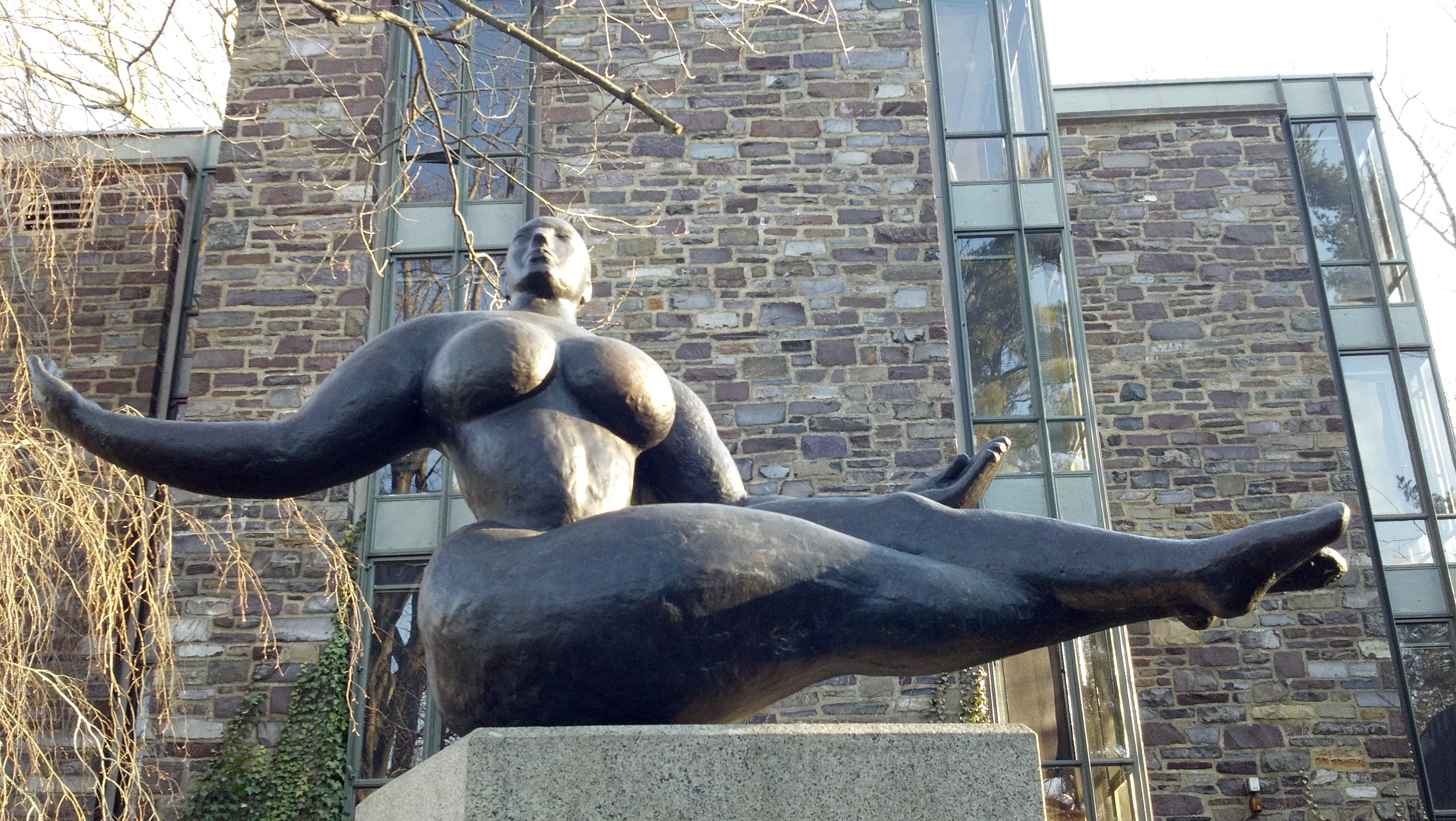
Floating Figure, by Gaston Lachaise

Located within the New Graduate College's courtyard, Gaston Lachaise's Floating Figure is a cast bronze sculpture that is part of the University's John B. Putnam Jr. Memorial Collection. The piece is modeled on Lachaise's wife, Isabel Dutaud Nagle Lachaise. This cast of Floating Figure, cast ca. 1969, is the fourth of seven foundation casts subsequent to the original cast. The other casts are located around the United States of America and Australia. The original cast was itself exhibited at the Metropolitan Museum of Modern Art in 1935.

==== Northwood II, Kenneth Snelson ====
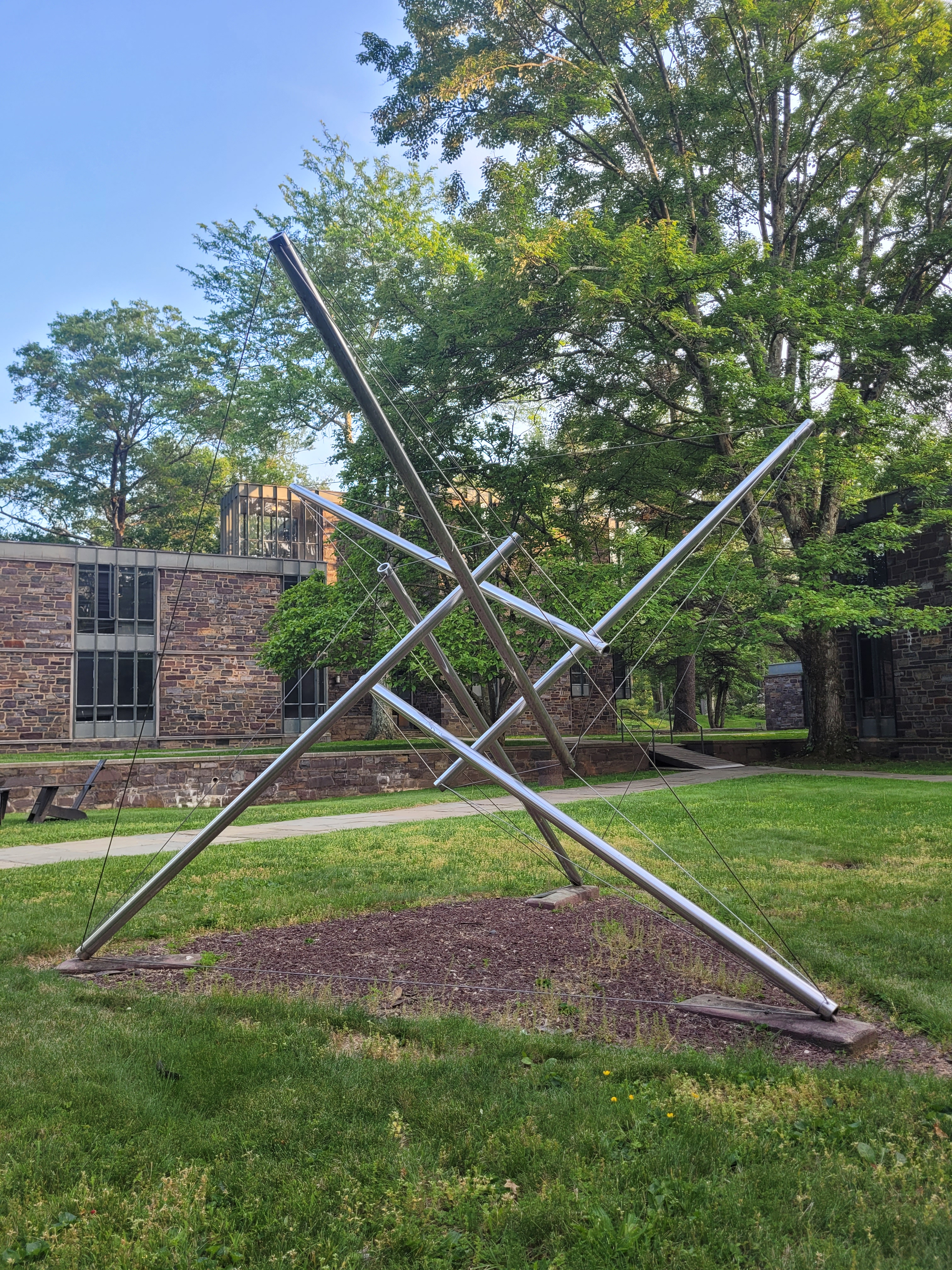
Northwood II, by Kenneth Snelson.

Kenneth Snelson's Northwood II is a Tensegrity sculpture, also located within the New Graduate College's courtyard, and also part of the University's John B. Putnam Jr. Memorial Collection. It consists of six equal length stainless steel tubes arranged in three parallel pairs, and a network of steel cables running between them, causing them to appear as floating. The Smithsonian American Art Museum's Art Inventories Catalog lists the sculpture as dating to 1970, and having been installed in 1973.

==== Andrew Fleming West Sculpture, Robert Tait McKenzie ====
The center of the Old Graduate College's courtyard houses R. Tait McKenzie's sculpture officially titled Andrew Fleming West, Class of 1874 (1853–1943). The bronze sculpture depicts the inaugural dean of the Graduate School, Andrew Fleming West, sitting in regalia upon a large chair. The bronze cast itself sits on top of a large engraved stone pedestal. The Princeton University Art Museum lists it as a donation by William Cooper Procter. Andrew Fleming West reportedly witnessed the unveiling of the statue himself, upon his retirement in 1928.
