= Peter Putnam =

Peter Putnam may refer to:

- Peter Putnam (scientist)
- Peter Putnam (bodybuilder)
