= Nellie McHenry =

American stage actress (1853–1935)

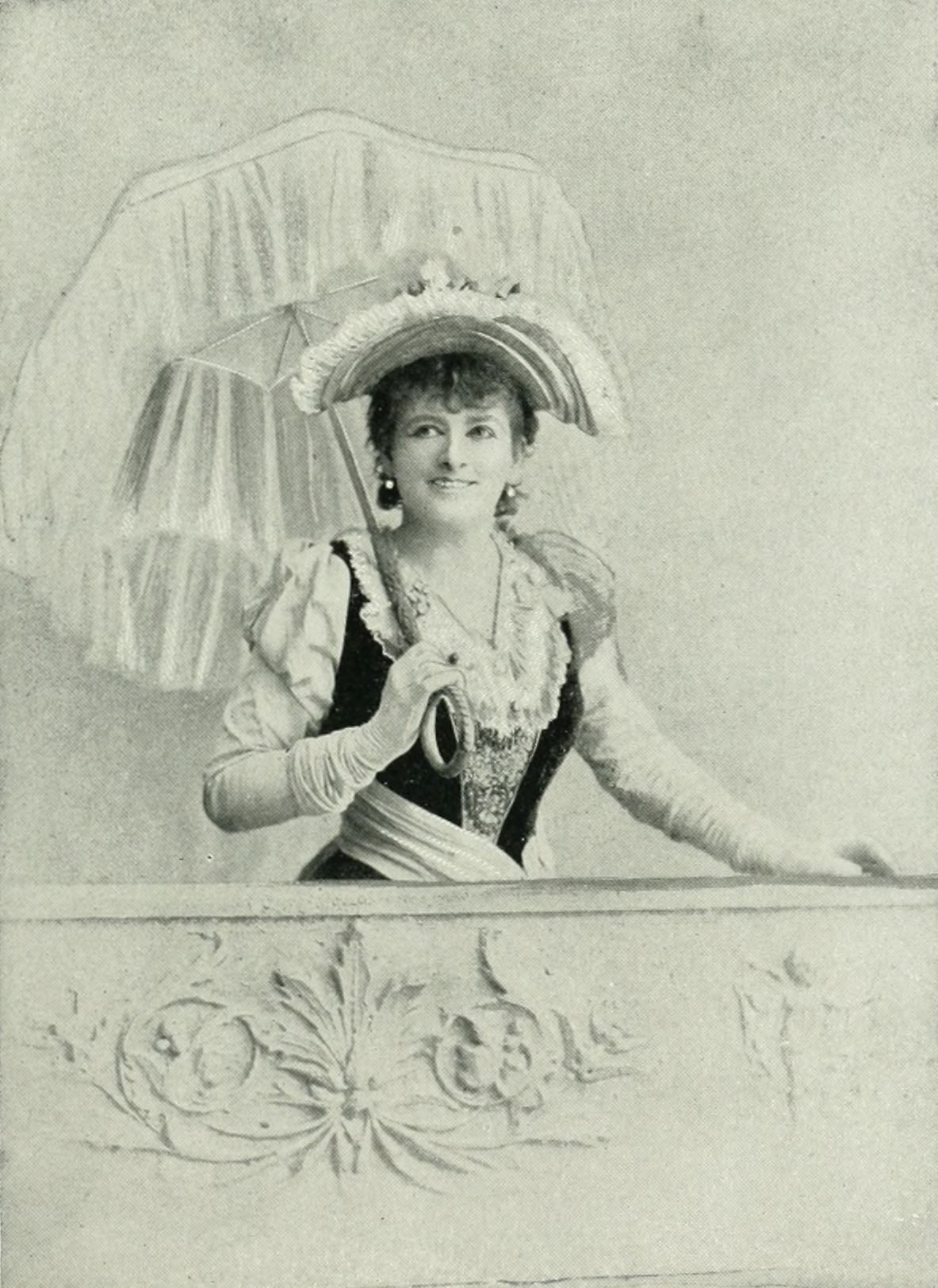
- Born: Nellie McHenry; May 29, 1853; St. Louis, Missouri, U.S.
- Died: May 4, 1935 (aged 81); Long Branch, New Jersey, U.S.
- Other names: Jolly Nellie McHenry
- Occupation: Stage actress
- Known for: Salsbury's Troubadours
- Spouse: John Webster

Nellie McHenry (May 29, 1853 – May 4, 1935) was an American stage actress.

== Early life ==
Nellie McHenry was born on May 29, 1853, in St. Louis, Missouri, United States.

== Stage career ==
At a young age, she began performing under the stage name Nellie McHenry. Starting as a ballet girl at the Pine Street Theatre under Ben DeBar, McHenry joined his Opera House Company in St. Louis by 1868. Early on, she was associated with Edwin Forrest, Edwin Booth, and Lawrence Barrett.

Nellie traveled to Kansas in the summer of 1869 and supported the Irwin's Dramatic and Operatic Troupe as a soubrette. She later returned to DeBar's theatrical troupe.

She performed alongside Lisa Weber's Burlesque and Comedy Combination troupe in the summer of 1871 in Topeka, Kansas and Missouri.

In 1872, she was part of the Chicago Academy of Music's stock company, later performing with the Chicago Museum company.

=== Hooley's Comedy Company ===
McHenry later became a member of Hooley's Comedy Company in Chicago. She joined the group alongside light comedian John Webster, whom she married. She made her first appearance at Hooley’s Theatre on February 8, 1875. She performed many soubrette parts in the plays of Bartley Campbell.

=== Salsbury's Troubadours ===
At Hooley's, she met Nate Salsbury, later joining him, John Webster, and W.S. Daboll to form the Salsbury Troubadours. The company, a six-person comic opera group, first performed in May 1875 in Chicago. She appeared in farces such as Patchwork, The Brook, and Bronson Howard's Green Room Fun. Her performance as the lead soubrette in The Brook brought her success. She toured Australia with the Salsbury Troubadours, and on her return was recognized as a talented actress.

At the Chestnut Street Theatre in Philadelphia, McHenry played in M’liss in 1880. She later starred as "Dollie Dashwood" in Three of a Kind, a comedy written in 1882 by Edward E. Kidder for the Salsbury Troubadours.

From 1884 through 1890, McHenry starred in seven productions at Macauley's Theatre in Louisville, Kentucky.

By 1886, Nellie McHenry was widely known as "Jolly Nellie McHenry," reflecting her cheerful personality. Jolly Nellie McHenry remained the lead in Salsbury's Troubadours' farce comedies until late 1888. After Salsbury withdrew from active stage life, the organization was changed to "Nellie Henry and Company." She became a star in her own right and led her own companies.

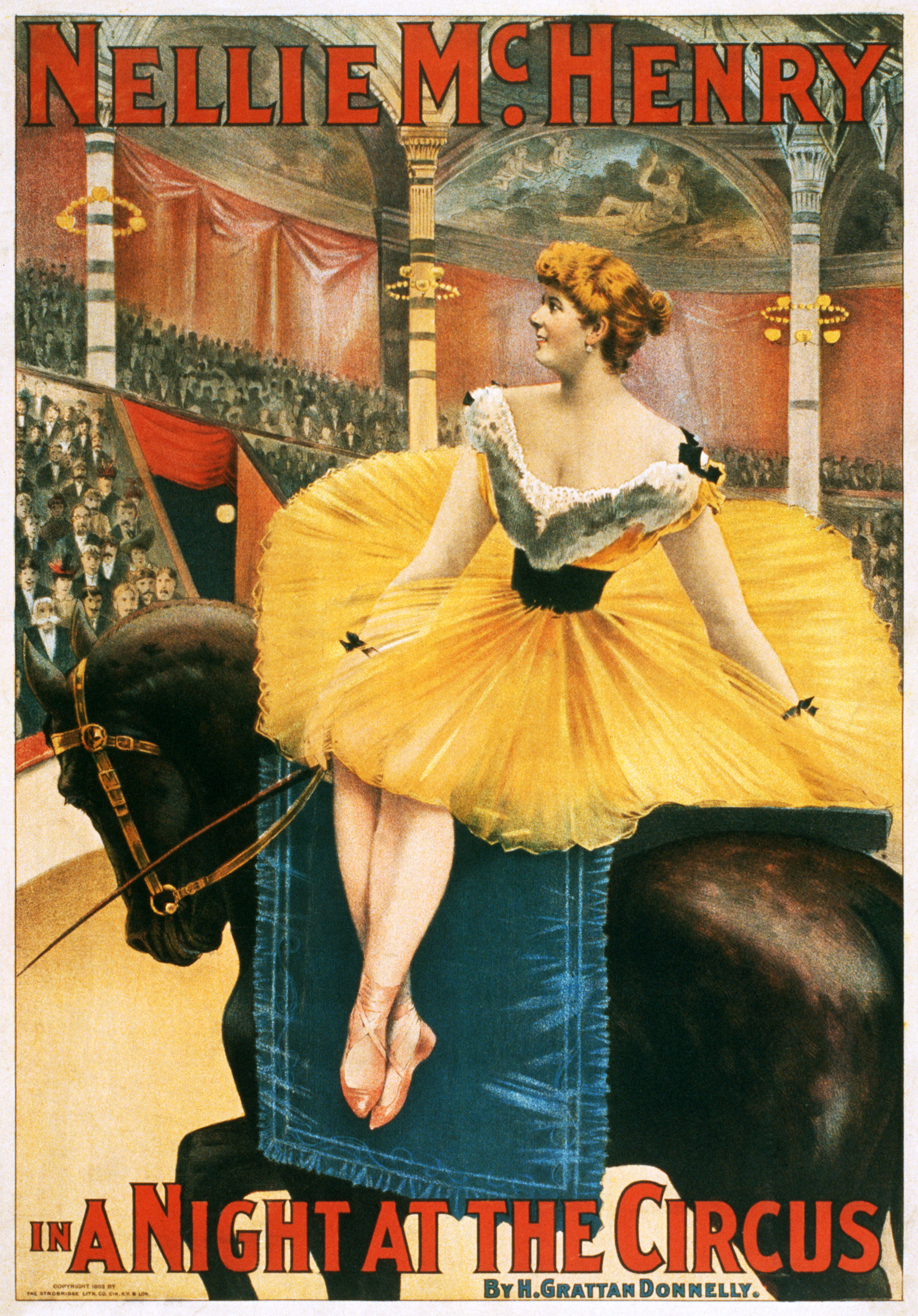
Nellie McHenry in A Night at the Circus, 1893.

By 1892, McHenry and her company began touring in A Night at the Circus, a theatrical production written by Henry Grattan Donnelly. She starred as "Mlle. Electra," a circus rider, who quits after a dispute with her manager, who then tries to force her back and have her arrested. When she seeks legal advice from two lawyers, they become infatuated with her despite being married. After discovering their wives, she plots revenge, making the men perform humiliating circus roles in her final act. In the last act, she would take the stage as the Queen of the Arena, wearing a circus rider's outfit while mounted on a horse.

Amid the bike boom, Nellie introduced her cyclo-comedy The Bicycle Girl at the Grand Opera House in 1895. It was written especially for her by Louis Harrison and performed exclusively by her.

In 1895, she debuted her operatic comedy A Night in New York. It was written specifically for her by Henry Grattan Donnelly. McHenry played the wives in a farce about two spirited gentlemen and their spouses. Her dual role included "Miss Henriette," a demure New England maiden and "Peerless Peri," a vaudeville queen.

She performed Vincent Maggio's "The Dimple in Her Chin" in January 1899.

McHenry starred in the title role of a M'liss revival in the early 1900s. She toured successfully for five years in M'liss.

== Personal life ==
Nellie McHenry was married twice. Her first marriage, in 1871, lasted only five months before ending in July.

In June 1873, she married John N. Webster in Toledo, Ohio. He went missing one night in 1900 at Niagara Falls and was presumed lost to the falls, with no body ever found.

== Death ==
Nellie McHenry Webster in Long Branch, New Jersey, United States, on May 4, 1935, aged 81. Her death occurred at the Monmouth Medical Center.

== Legacy ==
Nellie McHenry was among the first to perform in what later became known as farce comedies.

By 1890, McHenry appeared in advertisements to promote the Sweet Caporal brand for Kinney Brothers Tobacco Company.
