= Nate Salsbury =

American showman, actor, and playwright (1846–1902)

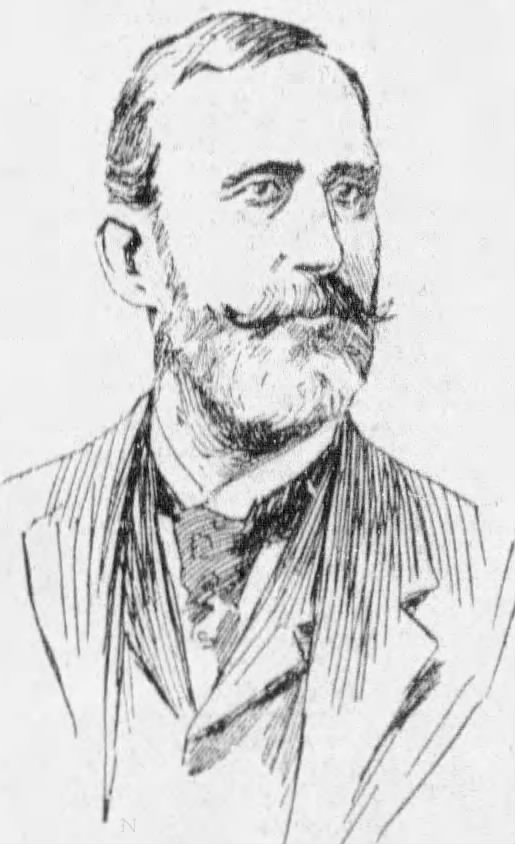
- Born: Nathan Salsbury; February 28, 1846; Freeport, Illinois, U.S.
- Died: December 24, 1902 (aged 56); Long Branch, New Jersey, U.S.
- Resting place: Woodlawn Cemetery in The Bronx, New York
- Occupations: Showman; stage actor; playwright
- Known for: Co-founder of Buffalo Bill's Wild West
- Notable work: Patchwork
- Spouse: Rachel Samuels (m. 1887)
- Children: 4
- Father: Nathan Salsbury
- Relatives: Rebecca Salsbury James (daughter)

Nathan Salsbury (February 28, 1846 – December 24, 1902) was an American showman, stage actor, playwright, theatrical agent, and co-founder of Buffalo Bill's Wild West.

== Early life ==
Nathan "Nate" Salsbury was born on February 28, 1846, in Freeport, Illinois, United States.

His parents were Nathan and Rebecca Welch Salsbury. They named him Nathan, making him the sixth in a line of Salsburys to bear the name, tracing back to a forebear who settled in Vermont before the American Revolution.

He received his education in Freeport's public education system.

After losing his father during childhood, he eventually left home to escape his stepfather's cruelty.

== Career ==
At fifteen, he enlisted in the Union army when the American Civil War began in 1861. He served with the 15th Illinois, was wounded and discharged, then returned to serve with the 89th at Chickamauga and Chattanooga, and finally with the 59th Illinois in Texas. Part of the Army of the Cumberland, the regiments engaged in combat in Georgia, Tennessee, and Texas. For several months, he was held at the Andersonville Prison, a prisoner-of-war camp in Georgia.

At the war's end, he left the Union army with $20,000 that he made from playing poker. He began studying banking and finance at a business college in Illinois. After depleting his poker earnings within eighteen months, he turned to theatrics as an actor, playwright, and manager in hopes of fame and fortune.

=== Stage career ===
Though his first ambition was to become a minstrel performer, Salsbury developed into a polished variety show artist.

His stage debut came in 1868 in Pocahontas at Grand Rapids, Michigan, a brief eight-minute role in a single-night performance. In 1869, after months of touring, Salsbury joined the Boston Museum stock company. After four years, he joined Hooley's Comedy Company of Chicago and toured the West for a few more years. He joined the group alongside John Webster and Nellie McHenry and got his first financial break from a benefit performance at Hooley's, where he played Shakespeare's Shylock and the banjo the same night.

After two years, he launched his own theatre stock company with John Webster. It was established with performers from the Boston theaters, and by January 1872, he opened in Portland, Maine. During this period, he presented On the Trail, or, Money and Misery.

=== Salsbury Troubadours ===
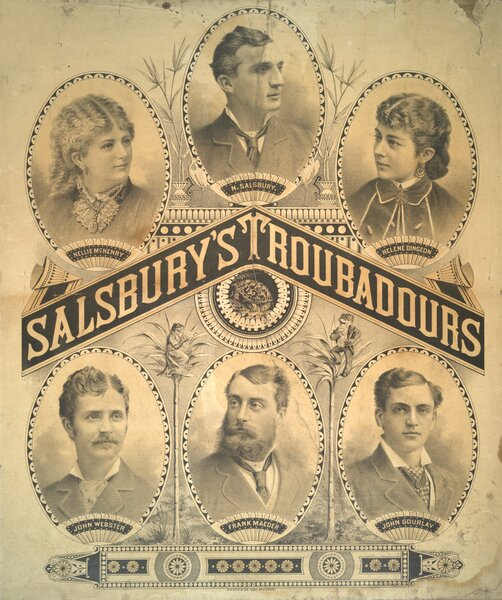

One day, Salsbury's attention was caught by the Vokes family. While in Chicago, he formed the "Salsbury Troubadours," otherwise known as the "American Vokes," a comic opera company formed by six people. Salsbury worked as the star performer of the troupe and a playwright, starting out with the opera Patchwork in 1875. He was supported by soubrette artist Nellie McHenry, pianist Frank Maeder, light comedian John Webster, ingénue lead Helene Dingeon, and comedian John Gourlay. The company played in The Brook, Green Room Fun by Bronson Howard, and in other farces. Despite early losses, the company's low costs helped them stay afloat until they eventually found success. In 1876, Salsbury penned The Brook in twelve hours, and it went on to be a sell-out for five continuous years. The troupe first performed at Macauley's Theatre in late 1876 and returned for another engagement in October 1878. Salsbury spent fifteen successful years touring the United States and Europe. His exposure to Australian horse-racing during his Troubadours tour sparked his interest in developing a horsemanship show.

=== Buffalo Bill's Wild West ===
In 1882, after touring Australia, Salsbury came into contact with Col. William Frederick Cody, famed from Ned Buntline stories as "Buffalo Bill." He had been inspired to produce a Wild West show and envisioned managing one led by the frontiersman W. F. "Buffalo Bill" Cody. While dining at a Brooklyn restaurant next to Haverly's Theatre, the two men conceived their most ambitious show concept. Salsbury pitched the idea of a show that would bring the American Wild West to the open-air with Native Americans, cowboys, Mexicans, buffalo, wild steers, and bucking horses. Under a mutual agreement, Salsbury and Cody planned to divide profits evenly and delay their project for a year to raise enough capital for their venture. Cody soon returned to North Platte, while Salsbury departed for Europe with his Troubadours. When Salsbury returned in early 1883, he received a telegram from Cody inviting him to collaborate with Dr. William Frank Carver on a Wild West exhibition. Disappointed by Cody's disregard for their pact, Salsbury declined. He later attended a performance in Coney Island as a spectator. By season's end, a dispute between Cody and Carver ended their partnership, and Cody persuaded Salsbury to revive their original plan together. A new partnership was formed between Salsbury, W. F. Cody, and Adam Bogardus, but Bogardus later withdrew by selling his share to his partners. When Bogardus was no longer part of the show, Salsbury recruited Annie Oakley, and after seeing her shoot, he promptly had her photographed and printed promotional materials made.

Salsbury had been a key figure in the launch of Buffalo Bill's Wild West for the summer season of 1884. The cast rehearsed daily throughout the winter, under Salsbury's direction, who invested some of his own money in the venture. He also acted as a mediator for the performers in their disputes with Buffalo Bill. He became co-owner of Buffalo Bill's Wild West Show, which later toured Great Britain. They debuted in England during the Golden Jubilee of Queen Victoria in 1887. In London, he conducted two performances personally for Queen Victoria. By 1888, he amassed a large fortune by his connection with the Wild West show. He was later received by Pope Leo XIII at the Vatican in 1890, and in 1892, they appeared again before the Queen and the royal family at Windsor Castle. Salsbury, acting as business manager, explained the act while standing next to the queen.

=== Black America ===
Once the Wild West Show finished its run at Brooklyn's Ambrose Park, Salsbury aimed to find another production for the vacant venue in 1894.

He launched Nate Salsbury's "Black America" in May 1895, serving as its proprietor and sole director. His idea was to present an authentic Southern Black community and demonstrate Black cultural advancement. To assemble the show, he enlisted the help of acclaimed African-American performer Billy McClain. With a cast of over 300 African Americans, the show combined acting, singing, and tumbling. Salsbury had a special train built to transport his troupe between cities. It included nine cars for the company, one designated for his staff, two baggage cars, and a commissary car. Visiting New York, Boston, Washington, and Philadelphia, the production wrapped up its tour in roughly six months.

Following a serious illness in 1895, he became a wheelchair user. When his health failed, he relinquished some managerial duties, though he kept control of the financial management of the Wild West show. His profit from the show amounted to $40,000 a year.

Alongside his work with Buffalo Bill's Wild West, he held the role of vice president in prominent ventures such as the Shoshone Irrigation Company, the Cody & Salsbury Canal, the Milner Live Stock Company, and the Milner & Boardman Realty Company. He also became a partner in the Barnum & Bailey Circus under James Anthony Bailey.

In 1900, Salisbury invested $200,000 to build a property called "The Reservation" in North Long Branch. The property was used as a summer residence by members of Buffalo Bill's Wild West Show. Salsbury assigned Native American names to each cottage, a nod to the "Show Indians."

== Personal life ==
On March 16, 1887, Salsbury married Rachel Samuels (1856-1937), a young actress from Newburgh he had once managed in Chicago. Together, they had four children: Nathan Jr. (1888), Milton S. (1890), and twin girls, Rachel and Rebecca Salsbury (1892). His daughter, Rebecca Salsbury James, became a renowned artist.

Several years before his death, he made his home in Long Branch, New Jersey, with his family. He also owned a ranch in Dateland, Arizona.

Salsbury, a Civil War veteran, belonged to the Grand Army of the Republic. He was also a member of the Lambs Club and the American Dramatists' Club and led the Long Branch Propertyholders' Association as president.

== Death ==
Nate Salsbury died in Long Branch, New Jersey, United States, in December 24, 1902, at 56.

== Works ==
- On the Trail, or, Money and Misery (1871)
- Patchwork (1875)
- The Brook (1876)

== Legacy ==
Nate Salsbury is often credited with introducing farce comedy to the U.S. stage.

He has a room named after him at Wyoming's historic Sheridan Inn, which Buffalo Bill once used as a headquarters.

In 1976, he was portrayed by Joel Grey in Robert Altman's Buffalo Bill and the Indians, or Sitting Bull's History Lesson.
