= Putnam Collection of Sculpture, Princeton University =

Group of sculptures on the Princeton University campus

The John B. Putnam, Jr. Memorial Collection of Sculpture is a group of outdoor sculptures distributed through the Princeton University campus in Princeton, New Jersey. The collection is made up of works from 20th and 21st century sculptors. In March 1968, President Robert Goheen announced that an anonymous donor gave a $1 million fund for the collection in honor of Princeton alumni John B. Putnam, Jr., Lieutenant U.S.A, who was killed in action during World War II. In 2025, this anonymous donor was revealed to be John's brother and fellow Princeton alum, the physicist, neuropsychologist and philosopher Peter Putnam. The works were selected based on a committee of alumni who are current or former directors of art museums, and the first 20 were purchased in 1969 and 1970.

The collection was first designed to have only 20 sculptures, but after receiving George Segal's Abraham and Issac, in 1979, the total catalogue increased to 21. The Princeton University Art Museum describes the collection as "not a static phenomenon" and that "work is underway to identify and purchase or commission works by artists."

== List of sculptures ==
=== Original twenty ===
The following is the twenty original sculptures before later ones were added.

Name of Piece	Artist	Executed	Installed	Material	Location	Image	References
Atmosphere and Environment X	Louise Nevelson	1969–1970	1971	Cor-Ten steel	Between Nassau Street and Firestone Library		
Construction in the Third and Fourth Dimension	Antoine Pevsner	1961–1962	1972	Cast bronze	Courtyard of Jadwin Hall		
Cubi XIII	David Smith	1963	1969	Stainless steel	Between McCormick Hall and Whig Hall		
Five Disks: One Empty	Alexander Calder	1969–1970	1971	Painted mild steel	Fine Hall Plaza		
Floating Figure	Gaston Lachaise	1927	1969	Cast bronze	Compton Court, Graduate College		
Head of a Woman	Designed by Pablo Picasso; executed by Carl Nesjar	1971 (Note: Designed in 1962)	1971	Cast concrete, granite, and quartzite	Located on the lawn between Spelman Halls and New South Building		
Marok-Marok-Miosa	Eduardo Paolozzi	1965	1969	Welded aluminum	Stairwell of the Architecture Building		
Mastodon VI	Michael Hall	1968	1969	Bronze and aluminum	Courtyard of MacMillan Building		
Moses	Tony Smith	1967–1968	1969 (Note: The piece was fabricated and installed during the same year.)	Painted mild steel	Lawn in front of Prospect House		
Northwood II	Kenneth Snelson	1970	1973	Stainless steel	East Dormitory Courtyard of the Graduate College		
Oval with Points	Henry Moore	1969–70	1971	Bronze	Between Stanhope Hall and Morrison Hall		
Professor Albert Einstein	Sir Jacob Epstein	1933	1970	Cast bronze	Fine Hall Library		
Song of the Vowels	Jacques Lipchitz	1969 (Note: Designed in 1931–1932)	1969	Cast bronze	Between Firestone Library and the University Chapel		
Sphere VI	Arnaldo Pomodoro	1966	1969	Polished bronze	Entrance of Fine Hall Library (Note: Previously located at the courtyard formed by Lourie-Love Hall and 1922, 1940, 1941, and 1942 dormitories)		
Spheric Theme	Naum Gabo	1973–1974	1974	Stainless steel	Courtyard of the Engineering Quadrangle		
Stone Riddle	Masayuki Nagare	1967	1972	Black granite	Courtyard of Engineering Quadrangle		
The Bride	Reg Butler	1956–1961	1970	Cast bronze	Courtyard of Rockefeller College		
Two Planes Vertical Horizontal II	George Rickey	1970	1972	Stainless steel	Between East Pyne Hall and the University Chapel		
Upstart II	Clement Meadmore	1970	1973	Cor-Ten steel	Entrance to the Engineering Quadrangle		
White Sun	Isamu Noguchi	1966	1970	Saravezza marble	Lobby of Firestone Library		

=== Official additions ===
Once the initial collection was finished, the university received George Segal's Abraham and Issac as a gift in 1979. The piece was commissioned for Kent State University in memorial of the 1970 Kent State shootings, but it was deemed too provocative. Segal subsequently donated it to Princeton as it was where he taught sculpture, and it was installed in 1979. The university would continue to receive additional sculptures through purchasing, continued support by the Putnam family through the Mildred Andrews Fund, or as gifts from artists; however, only Segal's work was included in the collection.

Name of Piece	Artist	Executed	Installed	Material	Location	Image	References
Abraham and Isaac: In Memory of May 4, 1970, Kent State University	George Segal	1978–1979	1979	Cast bronze	Between Firestone Library and the University Chapel		

=== Unofficial additions ===
The Princeton University Art Museum classifies several other pieces of artwork as falling under either the collection, although no reference to them as official additions can be found. (Note: More specifically, with the most recent literature on the collection being published before the latest additions, it is unclear if the pieces are a part of the official catalogue.) Additionally, while the art museum's map on the Putnam Collection labels Scott Burton's Public Table as part of the collection, (Note: The map also includes Maya Lin's Einstein's Table and The Princeton Line, while forgetting Sir Jacob Epstein's Professor Albert Einstein, David Smith's Cubi XIII, and Michael Hall's Mastodon VI.) no official publication nor the listing on the art museum's website considers it an official component.

Name of Piece	Artist	Executed	Installed	Material	Location	Image	References
Einstein's Table	Maya Lin	2019	2019	Jet Mist Granite	Lewis Arts Complex		
The Princeton Line	Maya Lin	2018	2018	Earth drawing	Lewis Arts Complex		
URODA	Ursula von Rydingsvard	2015	2015	Copper, steel, bronze	Entrance to the Andlinger Center for Energy and the Environment		

=== Putnam funding ===
Several works on campus, while not part of the collection, have received funding from either the Mildred Andrews Fund, like Scott Burton's Public Table, or the John B. Putnam Jr. Memorial Fund, like Doug and Mike Starn's (Any) Body Oddly Propped.
