= Willet Hauser Architectural Glass =

Willet Stained Glass Studios
- Predecessor: Willet Studios (1898); Hauser Art Glass, Co. (1946); Willet Hauser Architectural Glass (1977); Associated Crafts (1997); Associated Crafts & Willet Hauser (2014); Willet Stained Glass Studios (2023)
- Founded: 1898
- Headquarters: Winona, Minnesota
- Area served: North America and Abroad
- Services: Design, fabrication, and restoration of architectural stained glass windows
- Website: https://willet-studios.com/ Willet Stained Glass Studios

Willet Stained Glass Studios is a North American stained glass firm located in Winona, Minnesota, that specializes in the design, fabrication, preservation and restoration of leaded stained glass and faceted glass windows.

The studio, one of the oldest in North America, was formed through the merger of two American stained glass studios: the Willet Stained Glass Studios of Philadelphia, Pennsylvania, and the Hauser Art Glass Company, Inc., located in Winona, Minnesota. The two united in 1977 and together are one of the largest stained glass studios in North America. In 2005 the company changed its name to Willet Hauser Architectural Glass, Inc., to more accurately reflect the long-term direction of the studio. In 2014 the Arizona-based national stained glass studio Associated Crafts acquired Willet Hauser Architectural Glass, Inc. Then, in 2022 Associated Crafts & Willet Hauser was acquired by Utah-based investment firm, Aspen Mountain Partners who re-branded the company back to its original name, Willet Stained Glass Studios, to honor the 125th anniversary of its founding.

To date, Willet Studios has created and/or restored windows in more than 15,000 buildings located throughout the world. In 2018, Inc. Magazine named the company to its 37th annual Inc. 5000 list of the nation's fastest-growing private companies.

== History ==
=== Willet Studios ===
Willet Studios was founded in Philadelphia, Pennsylvania in 1898 by the muralist and stained glass artist William Willet and his wife, Anne Lee. In its inception, the studio went by the title of the Willet Stained Glass Company and by 1909, had been incorporated as the Willet Stained Glass and Decorating Company. By 1921, the firm was self-identified as "An organization of artists, designers, and craftsmen in ecclesiastical and domestic art. . . Devoted to the making of windows and decorations in the spirit and technique of the best European work of the Middle Ages." and listed the following within its oeuvre: Memorial Windows, Mural Paintings, Mosaics, Leaded Glass, Stations of the Cross, Altars, Triptychs, Fonts, Bronze Tablets, Tapestries, Interior Decorations of all descriptions as well as Portraits on Glass or Canvas and Miniatures.

Anne Lee and their son, Henry Lee, took over the studio after William's death in 1921. Under Henry's guidance, the company expanded from a regional business to a studio of national and international renown, with completed projects in all fifty states and fourteen foreign countries. Under Henry Lee's guidance, the studio experimented with new techniques, and in the 1950s, was one of the first American studios to design and fabricate faceted glass windows. Willet Studios also developed the famous sculptured gold window technique and experimented with various methods of laminating stained glass, a technique known as Farbigem. In 1971, the Franklin Institute awarded Henry Lee Willet the Frank P. Brown Medal.

In 1965, E. Crosby Willet, the son of Henry Lee Willet, became the third-generation president of Willet Studios. Under his leadership, Willet windows were created for many of the major churches and cathedrals in the United States including the National Cathedral in Washington, D.C. and the Cathedral of St. Mary of the Assumption in San Francisco.

=== Hauser Art Glass Company ===
The Hauser Art Glass Company, another long-standing American stained glass studio, was founded in 1946 by James E. Hauser in Winona, Minnesota. It was originally opened as a repair and restoration studio, focused on serving small, remote churches, after Hauser recognized an opportunity to aid many American churches whose stained glass windows had fallen into neglect and disrepair during the Second World War.

As the firm's projects became larger and more complex, a number of glass artists specializing in the replication of different design styles joined the studio. The firm eventually began creating moderately priced windows for neighborhood churches as well as windows for hotels, restaurants, and private homes. However, its main specialty remained the repair and restoration of existing stained glass, including those by Connick Studios, Tiffany Studios, John La Farge, Henry Wynd Young, Franz Mayer of Munich, and Innsbruck Studios.

=== Associated Crafts ===
In 1973, John Phillips Sr. was living in Pennsylvania and started to work for Hauser Art Glass Co in Winona as a national salesman. In 1980, three years after Hauser merged with Pittsburgh-based Willet Studios to become Willet Hauser Architectural Glass, Phillips Sr. left on friendly terms to start his own stained glass studio in Pennsylvania, in which his son John Phillips Jr. started to work. After 10 years, Phillips Sr. sold the business.

John Phillips Jr. and his wife Mary founded the Arizona-based stained-glass business Associated Crafts in 1997. Some of their work including sub-contracting work for Willet Hauser. The business grew rapidly as a national stained glass studio and in Jan 2014, Associated Crafts acquired Willet Hauser Architectural Glass, Inc., combining to become one of the notable global forces in stained glass.

== Innovations ==
In the 1960s, when the industry began a movement toward contemporary design, Henry and Crosby Willet experimented in new styles and techniques including faceted glass, Farbigem (laminated glass), sculptured gold, mosaics, and sandcarving or sandblasting.

=== Farbigem ===
The Willet Studio introduced the Dutch technique of Farbigem to the United States in 1966, after a visit to the Amsterdam glass factory known as Glas-Industrie Van Tetterode. Research and development was carried out at the studio from 1967 into the 1980s.

In the process of Farbigem a base plate is made by sandwiching plexiglass between two layers of glass. On this surface, layer upon layer of glass can be built up in all different directions. Designs can be traditional or abstract. The pieces are held together by a crystal clear, flexible adhesive that was developed in the Netherlands which allowed the glass to naturally expand and contract. Entire walls could be designed in decorative thicknesses of glass. The farbigem technique eventually fell out of favor due to the deficient technology of the adhesive which, with time, allowed the multiple layers of glass to separate. Changes in aesthetic taste also contributed to its decline. Today, windows similar to the farbigem technique are fabricated in stained glass studios under the name "Laminated Glass".

=== Sculptured gold windows ===
Henry Willet created the first sculptured gold window between 1948 and 1949. When first devised, the sculptured gold overlay was based on leaded stained glass windows. Later, faceted glass set in epoxy resin was used. These glasses, about an inch in thickness, but possibly up to two inches for special effects, contribute great brilliance of color under transmitted daylight. The sheet lead overlay is formed in relief by repousse (literally "beaten up from the underside") to give a sculptured effect, and is also incised with slits of varying widths to let the richly colored glass background shine through in the daytime. The fact that the sculptured lead surface has been "flown" with 23 carat gold leaf is the secret of the brilliant metallic night effect. The appearance of silver can also be obtained by the use of palladium leaf, which does not tarnish. The first gold window installed in a church, known as the Glory Window, was designed by Henry Lee Willet and Marguerite Gaudin in 1951 for Westwood Community Church in Los Angeles, California.

== Notable commissions ==
=== Cadet Chapel ===
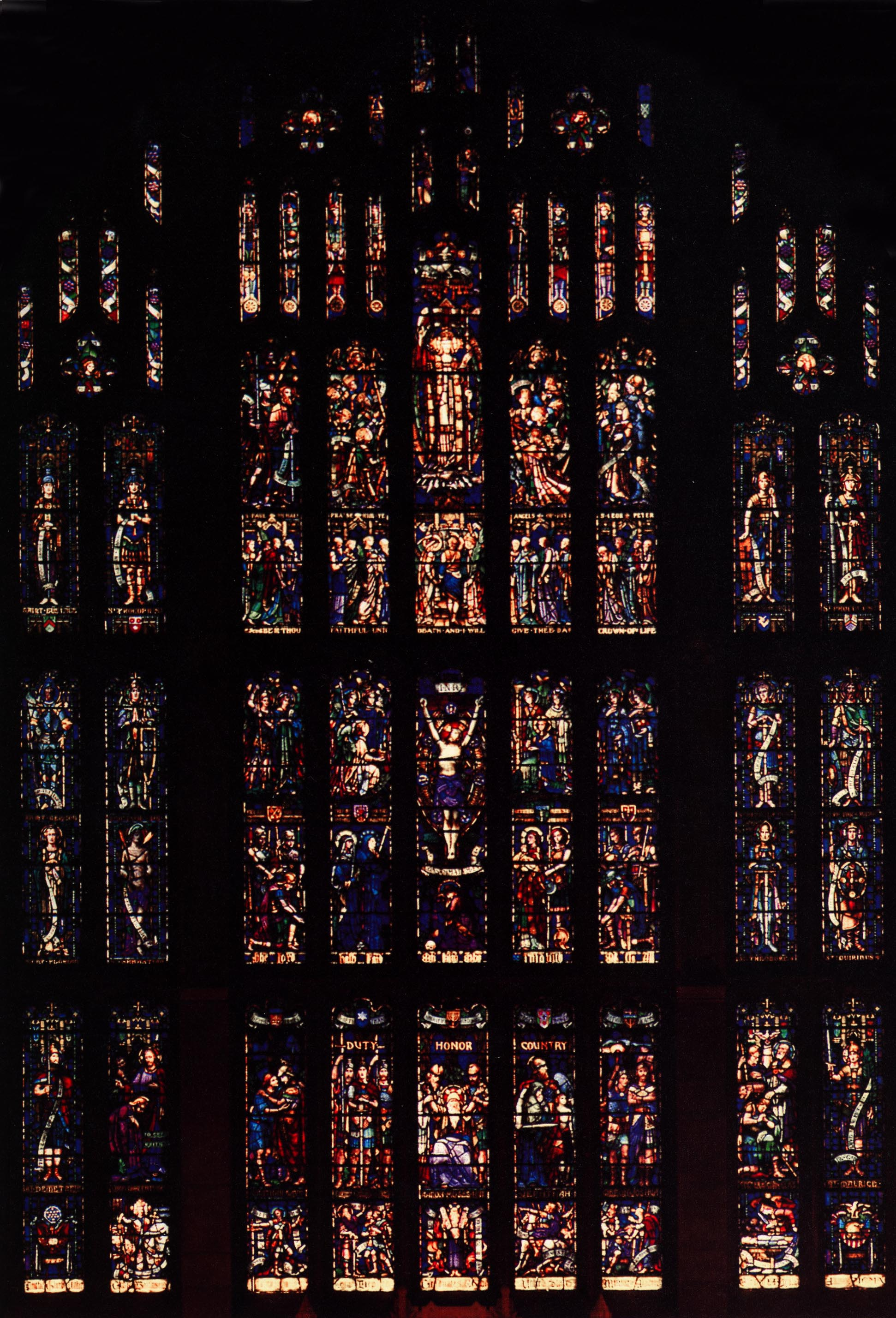
Sanctuary Window, Graduate Chapel, West Point, New York

In 1910, William Willet was invited to compete for the design and installation of the Great Sanctuary Window in the West Point Cadet Chapel at the United States Military Academy. Ten other designers, including Nicola D'Ascenzo and Tiffany Studios joined Willet in this international competition. In 1911, the studio was granted the commission of the Sanctuary window, a memorial to the graduates of the Military Academy. The project for the design and fabrication of the Nave and North windows was awarded to the Willet Studio. The master plan for the nave windows, which were sponsored by individual classes in the hopes that every class would eventually be represented, was devised by Bertram Goodhue, William Willet, Colonel C.W. Larned and Chaplain Edward S. Travers. The window program depicts familiar stories of the Old and New Testament, as well as stories of saints from the early church. The north window, also designed and fabricated by the studio, is a memorial to the alumni who died in World War I.

The commission, which spanned three generations of Willets over a period of sixty-six years, remains the longest continuing commission in American history.

=== Grace Episcopal Cathedral, San Francisco, California ===
In 1965, the studio completed six leaded stained glass windows for Grace Episcopal Church in San Francisco, California. Located in the east half of the north and south aisles, the studio's windows are part of a larger collection of art at the cathedral which includes stained glass works by Charles Connick, Gabriel Loire and an altarpiece casting of the last work completed by Keith Haring in the cathedral's AIDS Interfaith Memorial Chapel.

The commission began in the early 1960s when the studio was selected as a representative of the current-day masters of stained glass. Designed by Marguerite Gaudin, the colorful windows are contemporary in style, an intentional departure from the more traditional aesthetic of the earlier Connick windows. In 2009, a copy of Gaudin's New Testament Baptism (1964) design was displayed at the Rosenwald-Wolf Gallery as part of the University of the Arts Silver Star Alumni Award Exhibition.

=== Hall of Science and Technology ===
The Hall of Science was designed in 1962 by Wallace Harrison for the 1964 New York World's Fair in Flushing Meadows, New York. Harrison modeled the 80-foot-tall (24 m) building after the Kaiser Wilhelm Tower in Berlin, Germany - a 100-foot (30 m) faceted glass tower composed of deep blue faceted glass. Harrison's cornerless serpentine shaped Hall of Science is made up of 5,400 coffers, each 2 feet (0.61 m) wide and 3 feet (0.91 m) tall. The Willet Studio, under Henry Lee Willet's guidance, was commissioned to construct the 5,400 panels that form the walls in less than one years time. Each panel is composed of thick chunks of blue faceted glass held together by cement. Twenty to 30 different shades of blue glass, imported from France and the Blenko Glass Company of Milton, West Virginia, were used in the project. The blue light, which engulfs the interior, symbolizes the heavens and carries out the theme, "Rendezvous in Space."

=== Metropolitan Transportation Authority ===
Arts for Transit is a program of the Metropolitan Transportation Authority in New York City that encourages the use of public transit by presenting visual and performing arts projects in subway and commuter rail stations. As a part of the overall project, neighborhood artists working in various media are invited to compete for projects in nearby stations. In 1998 Willet Hauser was selected to fabricate faceted stained glass panels based on the winning designs of many of these artists. The project is one of the largest projects in the studio's history.

=== Saint Martin’s Episcopal Church, Houston, Texas ===
In 2001, the studio received the monumental commission to design and create the entire stained glass fenestration for St. Martin's Episcopal Church in Houston, Texas. The 36 window project, completed in May 2004, is the studio's largest-ever one-time commission. Over 100,000 individual pieces of hand-cut glass make up the clerestory windows alone. The church's Rev. Gibson, remarking on the coloration of the different blues within The Great Commission window, compared the work to Chartres stained glass: “...the bluest window I have ever seen, next to the Jesse Tree window in Chartres.”

Nearly 20 years later, in 2018, the studio was again commissioned to design and fabricate the stained glass in the church's new Christ Chapel and Parish Life Center.

== Contributing artists and designers ==
=== Other media ===
Ben Shahn, Frank Shoonover, Franklin Watkins, György Kepes, Jacob Landau, Ralph Pallen Coleman, Sadao Watanabe, Ellen Miret, David Pushkin, Max Abramovitz, Wallace Harrison have worked with the studio in other media.
