= Standing Woman =

Sculpture

Coordinates: 48°51′49″N 2°19′40″E

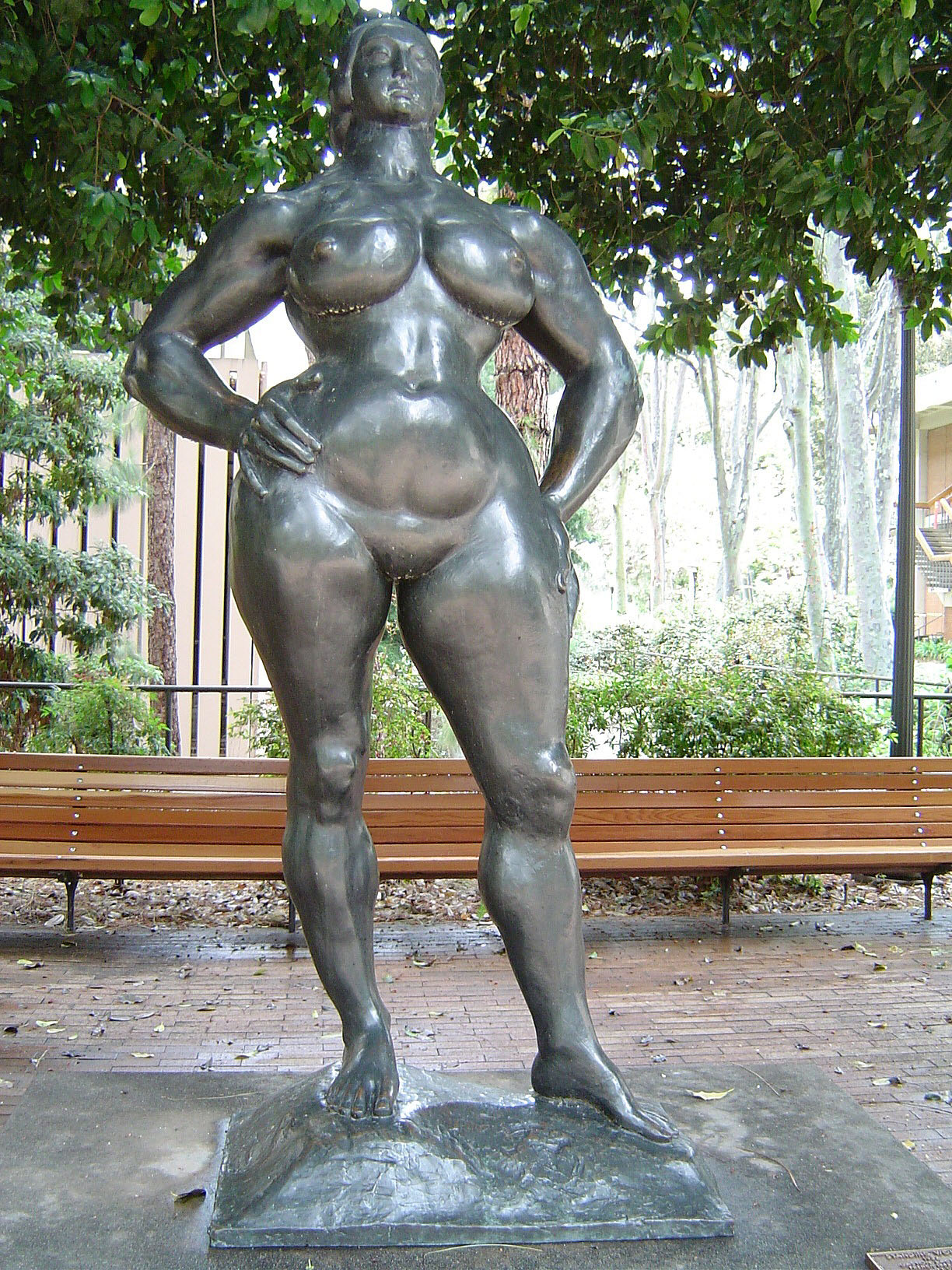
- Artist: Gaston Lachaise
- Year: model 1928–1930, cast 1980
- Type: Bronze
- Dimensions: 224.2 cm × 113.7 cm × 64.5 cm (88 1/4 in × 44 3/4 in × 25 3/8 in)
- Location: Los Angeles, United States
- Owner: University of California, Los Angeles

Standing Woman is a heroic bronze statue of a confident, robust nude woman by Gaston Lachaise that was modeled in 1928–1930 and first cast in bronze in 1933.

Lachaise created the full-scale model for statue and cast it in plaster in 1928–1930; inscribed the plaster model with a copyright date in October 1932; and immediately sent it to Munich to be cast in bronze by Preissmann Bauer & Co., a foundry known for its inexpensive yet exceptionally fine bronze casting. The bronze was evidently cast in 1933 but not completed due to Lachaise's chronic failure to pay his foundry bills. It was returned to him in April 1934 and chased and finished by him a month later. That first cast, exhibited in his 1935 retrospective at the Museum of Modern Art, was donated to that museum in 1948. Standing Woman has become one of Lachaise's most acclaimed sculptures as well as an icon of American art.

There are eight other bronze casts of Standing Woman. The second bronze, issued by Lachaise's widow, Isabel Dutaud Lachaise, was cast by the Roman Bronze Works, Corona, Long Island, New York, in 1956, and acquired in that year by the Brooklyn Museum. An edition of six numbered bronze casts authorized by the Lachaise Foundation was produced between 1980 and 2000. They were acquired by: the Franklin D. Murphy Sculpture Garden (1/6, cast 1968); the Milwaukee Art Museum (2/6, cast 1980); the Hirshhorn Museum and Sculpture Garden (3/6, cast 1981); the private collector, Barney Ebsworth (4/6, cast 1993; resold in 2018); and another private collector (5/6, cast 1995). The sixth cast, produced in 2000, traveled through Europe 2003-2006 in the Foundation's traveling exhibit (Roubaix, France; Rome, Italy; Cahors, France; Budapest, Hungary; Prague, Czechia), returning to the US from 2007-2010 (New Orleans, LA; Dallas, TX; Naples, FL) returning again to Europe, Madrid, Spain, to be included as item no. 1 in the Thyssen-Bornemisza Museum's 2011 exhibition Heroinas. From 2011 it was on loan to LongHouse Reserve in East Hampton, until 2012 when it was exhibited in the Bruce Museum's "Face & Figure" show and in the Portland Art Museum's "Man/Woman Lachaise" show of 2013. From 2019 it has been privately owned (6/6, cast 2000). Finally, an artist's proof was issued by the Lachaise Foundation in 2007, and is on loan to the Tuileries Garden. All but the casts owned by the Museum of Modern Art and the Brooklyn Museum were made at the Modern Art Foundry, Queens, New York.

Lachaise envisioned Standing Woman as an archetypal figure to be paired with an heroic statue of a muscular male nude, Man, which he also created in 1928–30, then somewhat revised in 1934. (The first bronze of Man was cast bronze in 1938, and is owned by the Chrysler Museum of Art.) Both Standing Woman and Man express his optimistic view of America's tremendous promise as a place for healthy personal expansion and self-expression. At an early stage of work on the two models in 1928, Lachaise described his intentions: “I am working at present at a large standing figure, a woman, on earth ...—vigorously and gloriously for all her share of what is good...—I will...start the figure of ‘Man’ also on earth, for all that is gloriously good to live and go through.” The latent potential of his deliberately constructed, ideal Woman is conveyed by her commanding yet relaxed stance (a mirror-image of the Man's), her extraordinarily formidable yet voluptuous torso, her proud, self-referential gestures, and her straightforward, outward gaze. Lachaise staunchly believed that his figurative sculptures, such as this extraordinary exemplar, would have a “healthful effect” on the viewer.
