= William Willet =

American multimode artist

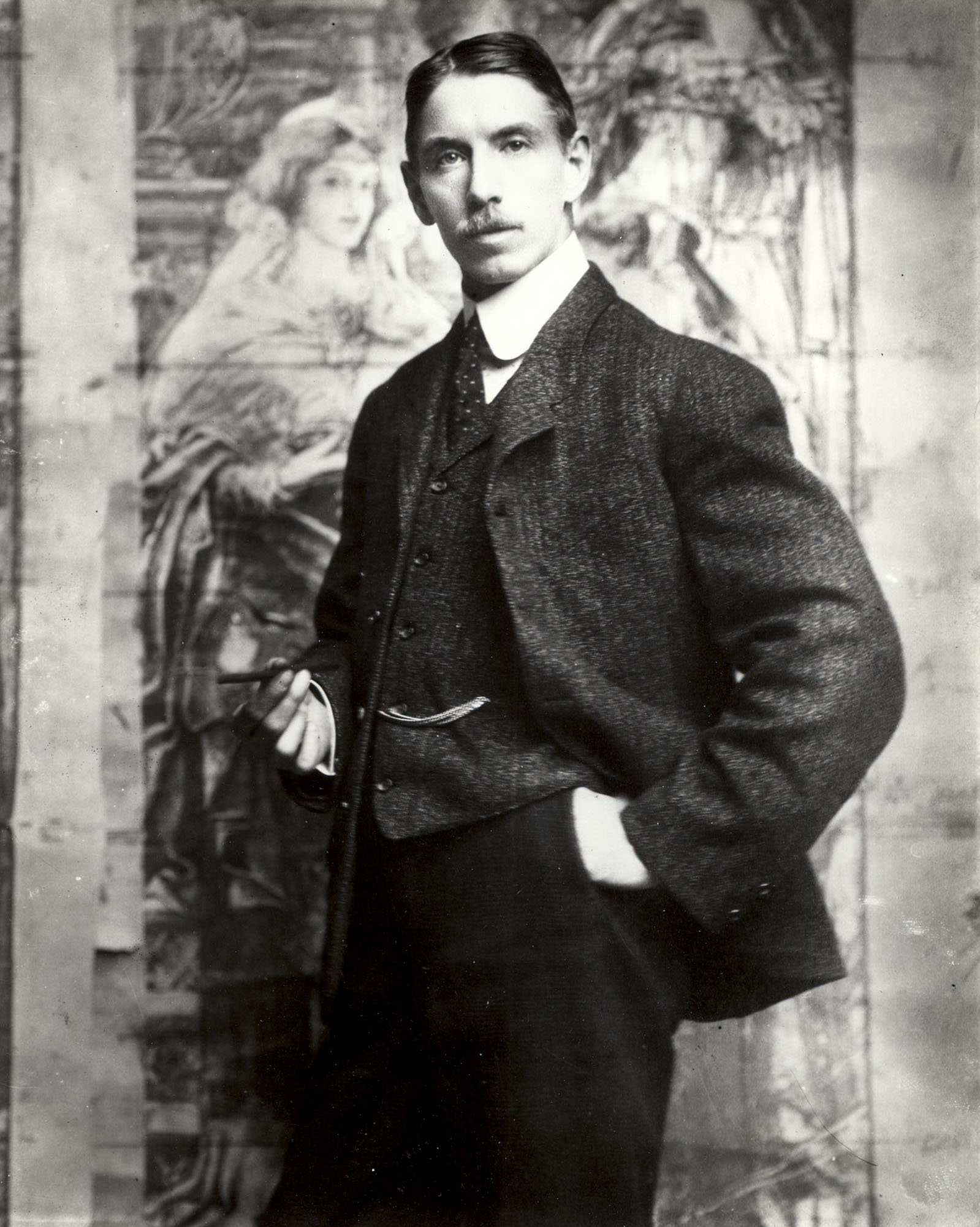
- January 1910
- Born: November 1, 1869; New York City
- Died: March 29, 1921 (aged 51); Philadelphia, Pennsylvania
- Known for: Stained Glass, Murals, Portraiture
- Notable work: Great West Window depicting the Seven Liberal Arts, Procter Hall, Princeton University; Chancel Window, Cadet Chapel, West Point Military Academy
- Movement: American Gothic Movement
- Patrons: Calvary Protestant Episcopal Church, Pittsburgh; First Presbyterian Church, Pittsburgh; William McKinley; Ralph Adams Cram

William Willet (November 1, 1869 – March 29, 1921) was an American portrait painter, muralist, stained glass designer, studio owner, and writer. An early proponent of the Gothic Revival in America and active in the "Early School" of American stained glass. He founded the Willet Stained Glass and Decorating Company, a stained glass studio, with his wife Anne Lee Willet where they focused on gothic style windows, rivaling other popular studios at the time who were focused on opalescent pictorial windows which were the rage in America at the turn of the twentieth century.

== Career ==
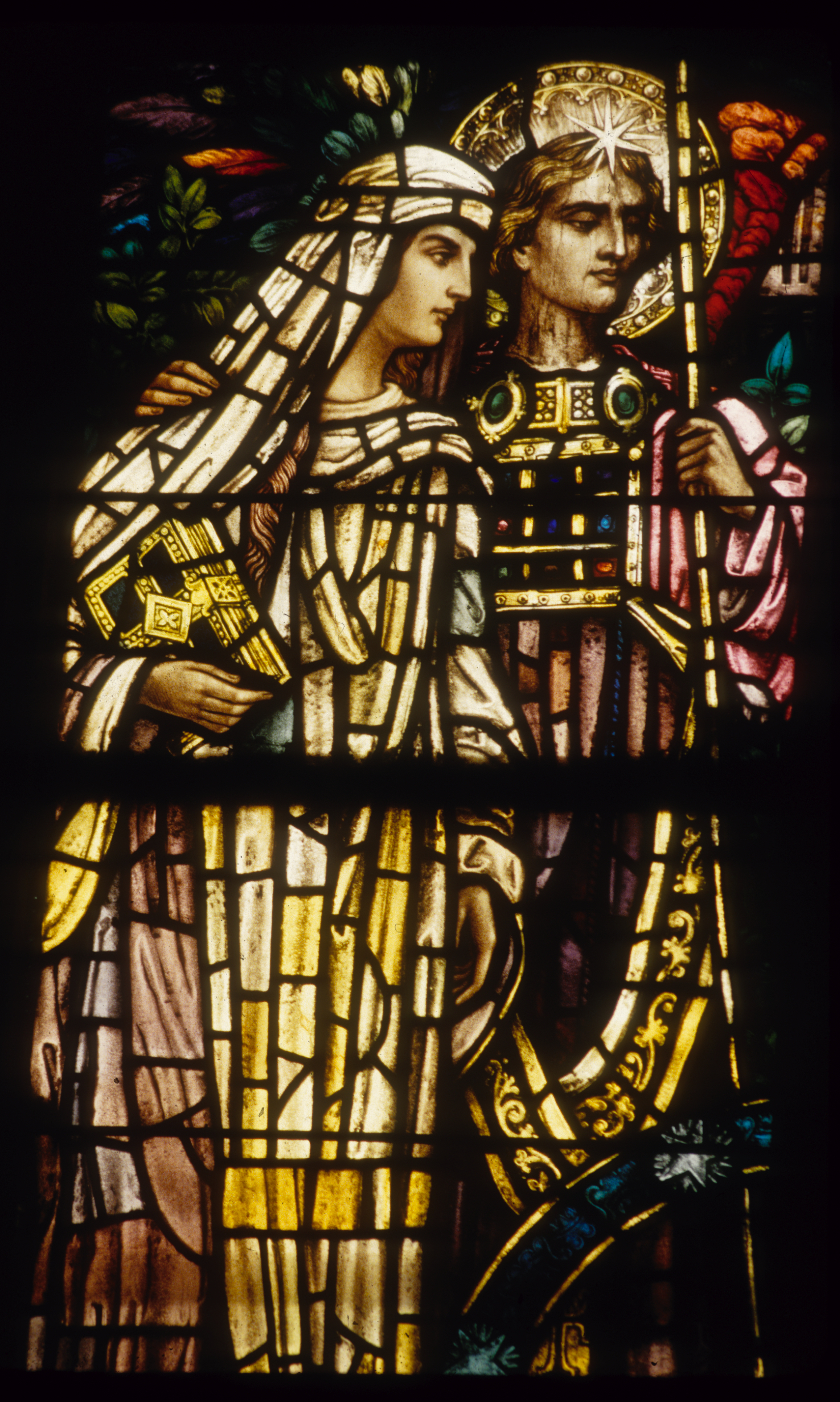
Married Couple, 1915 Leaded Stained Glass Window designed and fabricated by William Willet

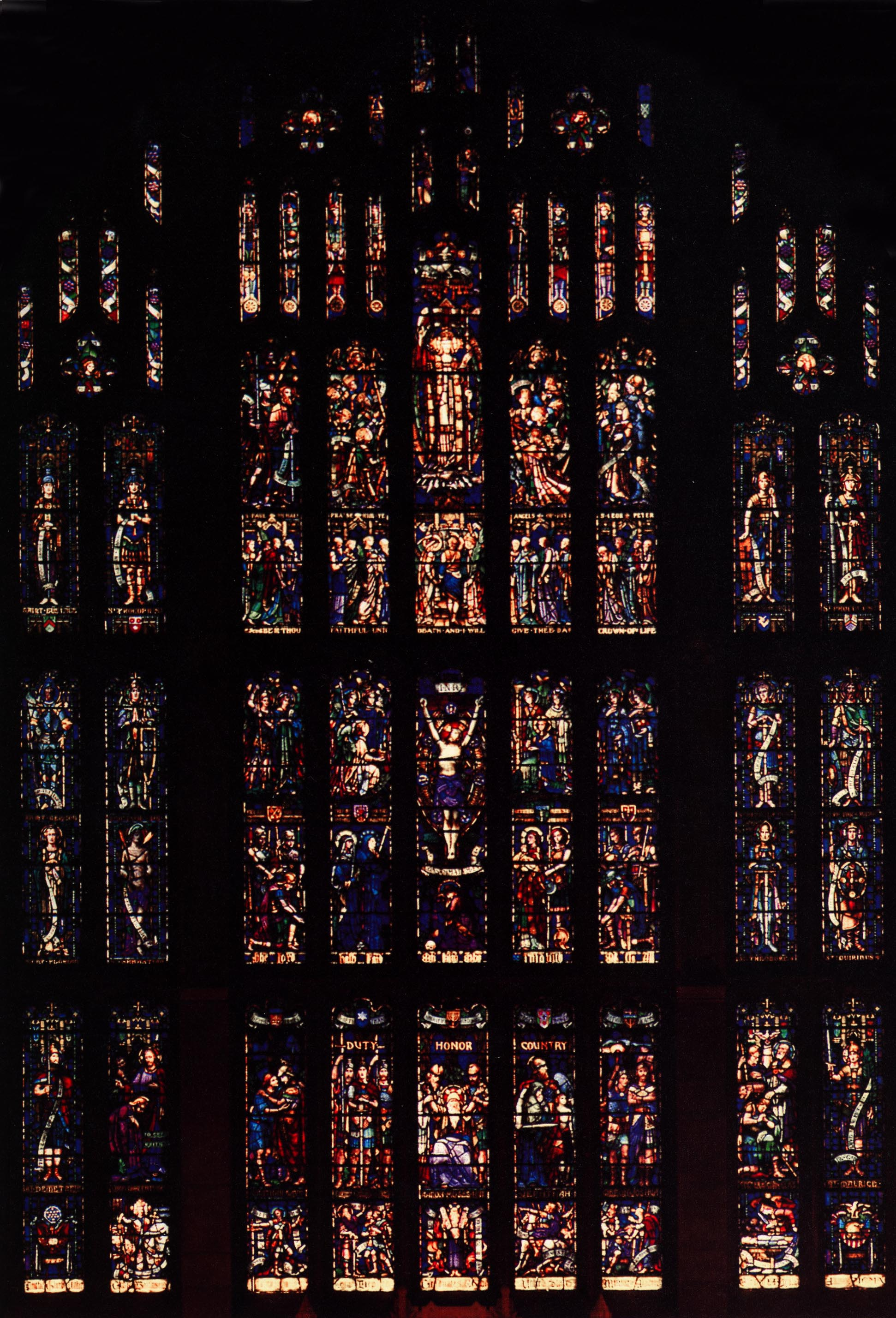
Duty, Honor, Country c. 1910–1911 Sanctuary Window Graduate Chapel, West Point, New York

A descendant of Thomas Willett, the first English mayor of New York City, Willet was born on November 1, 1869, in New York. He studied under the artist William Merritt Chase, at the Tradesmen's Institute in New York City and in France and England. Originally a portrait painter, Willet made portraits for President William McKinley, John Jacob Aster, William McEwan, among others. He assisted John La Farge between 1885 and 1887 during which time he served as art director and painted faces on murals.

In 1896 he married Anne Lee, daughter of the Reverend Henry F. Lee, of Philadelphia. In 1897 the couple moved to Pittsburgh, where Willet served as art director of stained glass artist Ludwig Grosse's stained glass firm from 1897 to 1898, before establishing his own studio, the Willet Stained Glass Company, in 1899.

Inspired by European work and the Pre-Raphaelites, Willet rebelled against the American School of stained glass – a movement established by Louis Comfort Tiffany and John La Farge identified by its use of opalescent glass. Willet believed that opalescent glass ignored the principles of architecture and did not fulfill the purpose of a window. Instead, he was enamored with the medieval technique of transparent antique glass, lecturing and writing constantly on the subject. As a member of what Charles J. Connick termed the "Early School" of stained glass artists, Willet, and fellow craftsmen Otto Heinigke and Harry E. Goodhue, are credited with renewing America's interest in traditional medieval materials, techniques, and aesthetic.

He is responsible for making the first medallion window in America, in the First Presbyterian Church of Pittsburgh, Pennsylvania and the second in Calvary Episcopal Church of Pittsburgh, Pennsylvania. The first medallion window, designed and executed for First Presbyterian Church of Pittsburgh was composed of antique stained glass in the medieval manner. It was ill favored by the Senior Pastor, Dr. Maitland Alexander, who found it archaic and cheap. He ordered that the window be covered with heavy canvas and a great organ erected before it. Before it was hidden from view, however, it caught the attention of Neo-Gothic architect Ralph Adams Cram who would later serve as a patron for many of the Willet's works.

In 1910 Willet won the commission for the Great Sanctuary Window in the Cadet Chapel at the United States Military Academy in West Point, New York. That window, entitled Duty, Honor, Country is composed of seven lancets and measures 34 feet wide by 50 feet tall. At the time, the competition was recognized as one of the most memorable ever held in the United States. Designs submitted to the selection jury were displayed for several weeks at the Boston Museum of Fine Arts. Willet beat out Louis Comfort Tiffany and many other accomplished designers of the day. Following its completion, the project for the design and fabrication of the Nave and North windows was awarded to the Willet studio. The commission, which spanned three generations of Willets over a period of sixty-six years, remains the longest continuing commission in American history.

Other windows Willet designed are those of Mather Memorial in Trinity Cathedral, Cleveland, Ohio; Cathedral of Saint Paul in Pittsburgh, Pennsylvania; Church of the Holy Spirit, Asbury Park, New York; Procter Hall at the Princeton University Graduate College, Princeton, New Jersey; World War Memorial Window in Trinity Episcopal Church, Syracuse, New York; windows in Green-Wood Cemetery Chapel, Brooklyn, New York; and the following windows in Philadelphia, Pennsylvania: Joseph Harrison Memorial, Church of the Holy Trinity, Philadelphia; Alfred Harrison Memorial, Calvary Protestant Episcopal Church, Germantown, Pennsylvania; St. Matthew's Catholic Church, Conshohocken, Pennsylvania.

== Death ==
He died on March 29, 1921, at the age of 52. Following his death his wife and partner, Anne Lee and their son Henry Lee continued the Willet Studio which today is recognized as Willet Stained Glass Studios. He is buried in Princeton Cemetery in Princeton, New Jersey. At the time of his death and still to this day, William Willet was considered one of the most important stained glass artists in America.

== Examples of William Willet's work in stained glass ==
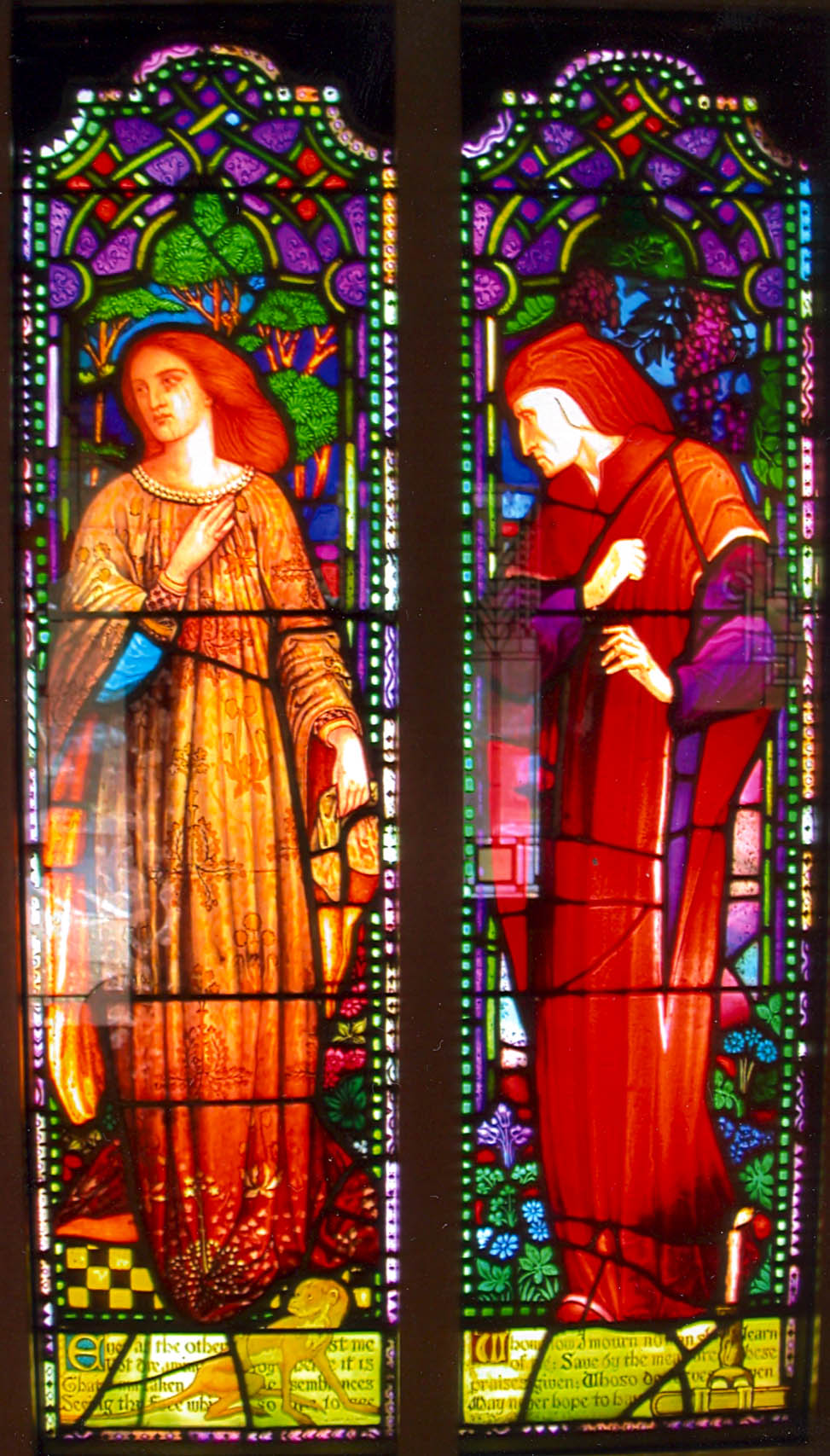
Dante and Beatrice, c. 1913–1920

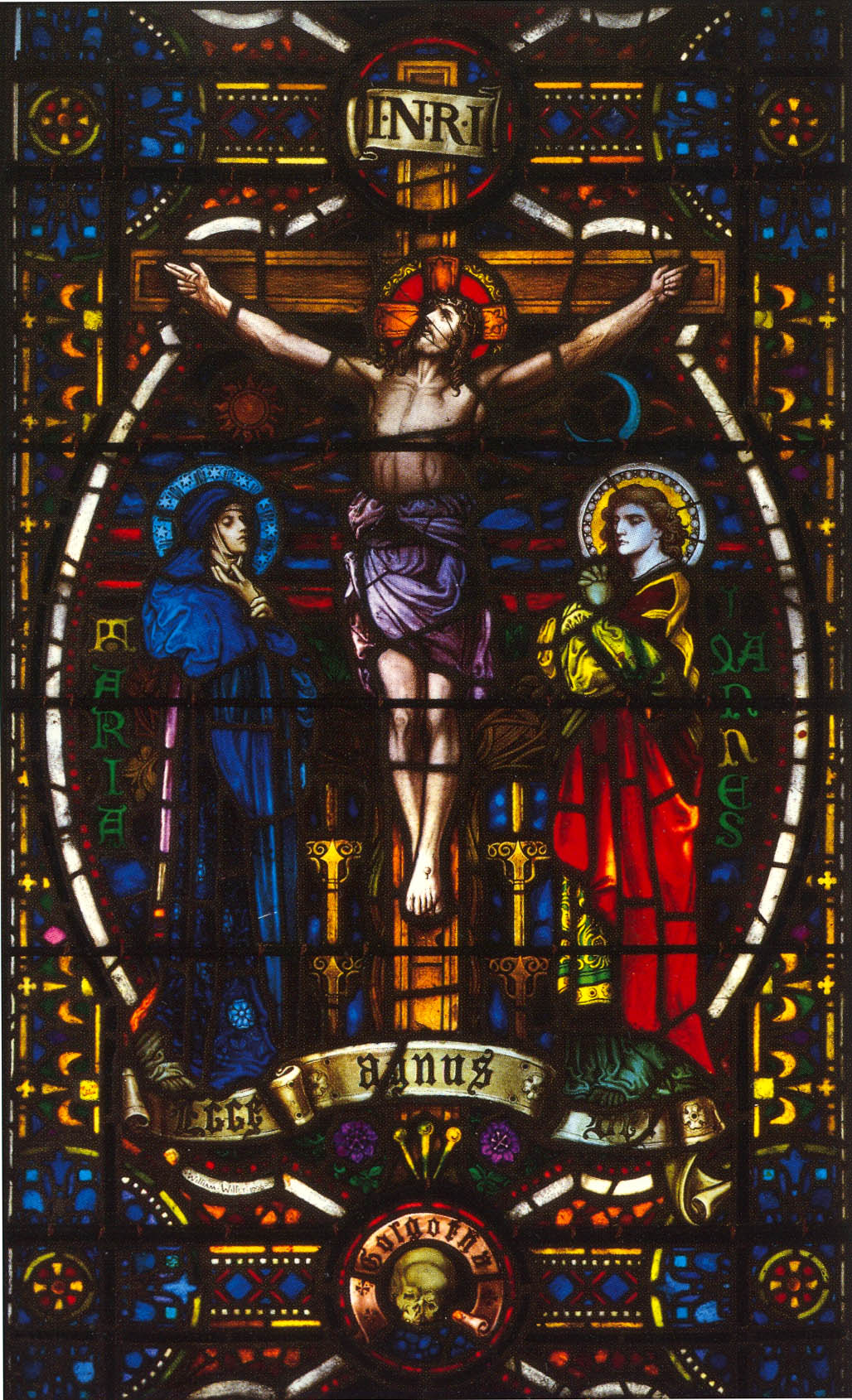
Crucifixion of Christ, 1906

Examples of William Willet's work, on permanent exhibition at the Corning Museum of Glass in Corning, New York.

== See also ==
The Cadet Chapel, United States Military Academy
Corning Museum of Glass
Old First Reformed Church, Brooklyn, New York
William Willet on askart.com
Willet Hauser Architectural Glass
Photos of Princeton University's Procter Hall
Description of the Great West Window, Procter Hall, Princeton University by William and Annie Lee Willet
