= Peter Putnam (scientist) =

American scientist

- Born: May 20, 1927
- Died: December 7, 1987

Peter Putnam (May 20, 1927–December 7, 1987) was an American physicist and philosopher. He worked on topics related to the observer effect and theory of mind, but never published his work.

== Life ==
Putnam was born in 1927, the son of wealthy parents John and Mildred Putnam. He studied physics at Princeton University as both an undergraduate and Ph.D., apprenticing during the latter with Albert Einstein, and studying with John Wheeler. He also served in the U. S. Navy for three years.

Despite his familial wealth, Putnam worked as a janitor, donating his inheritance to charity, including funding the Putnam Collection of Sculpture, Princeton University and The Nature Conservancy. He died at the age of 60 after being hit by a drunk driver in Houma, Louisiana. His notebooks are kept at the library of the American Philosophical Society in Philadelphia.
