= Floating Figure =

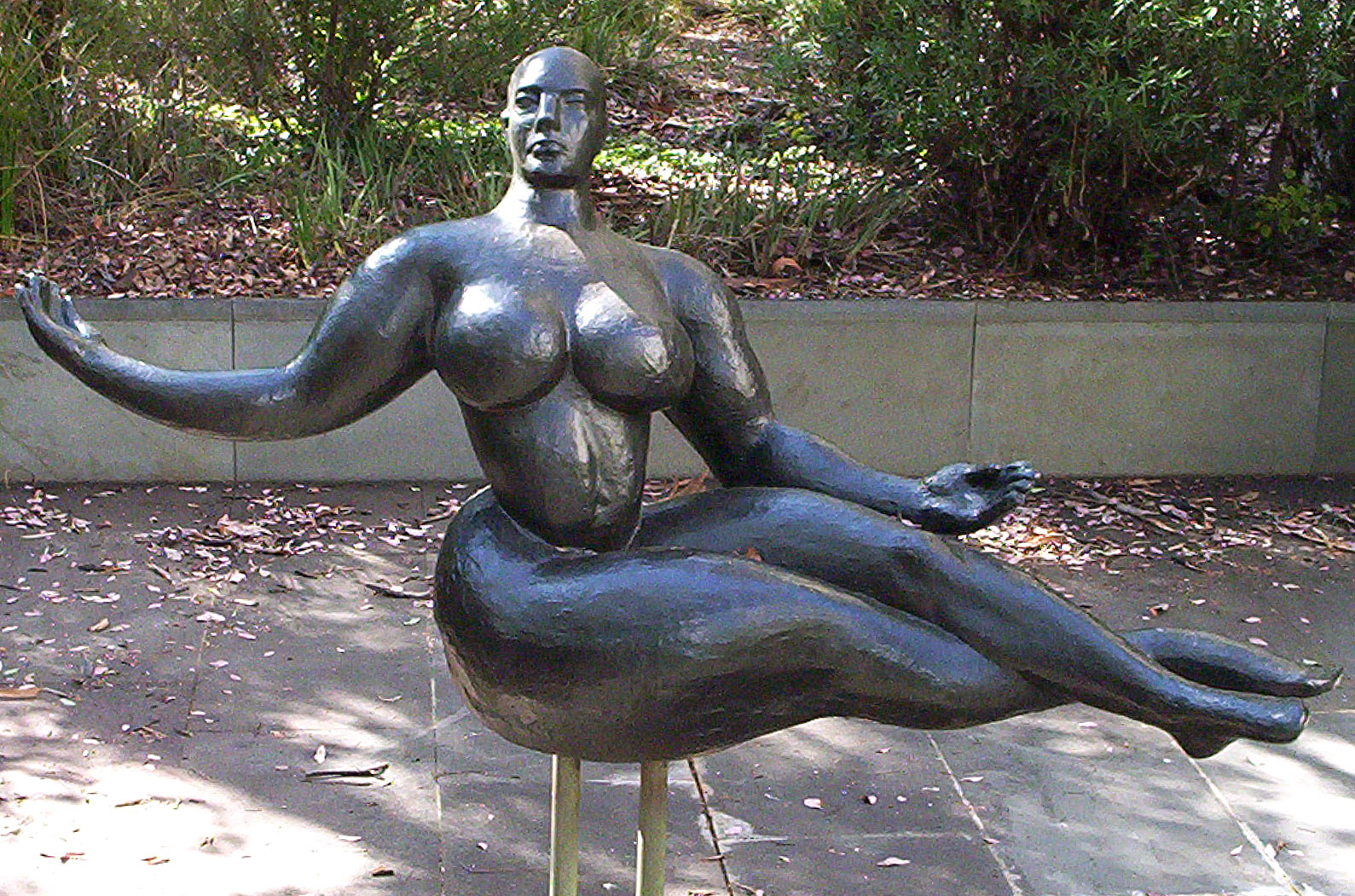
- Floating Figure, model 1927, cast 1980 (no. 5 from an edition of 7 Estate bronze casts), National Gallery of Australia
- Artist: Gaston Lachaise

Floating Figure is a 1927 sculpture by Gaston Lachaise.

Gaston Lachaise’s Floating Figure is a modernist allegorical statue of the artist’s muse as an enlightened, ‘floating’ nude woman. It is ultimately based on a portrait statuette of the artist’s wife, Isabel Dutaud Nagle (1872–1957), made in about 1919, that was broken sometime after the spring of 1921 and reworked by Lachaise in about 1924 to create a new statuette of a schematized, fragmentary figure. The damage to the initial statuette had fortuitously freed his imagination from a more literal representation of Isabel at home with a book, and enabled him to envisage a soaring, semiabstract work that explicitly conveys a universal meaning.

Lachaise created the larger-than-life plaster model of Floating Figure at his country home in Georgetown, Maine, in three weeks’ time. The full-scale plaster model of Floating Figure was exhibited as Woman in Lachaise’s important show at the Brummer Gallery, New York, in early 1928, when it was described as “a seated woman who by the power of her gestures seems suspended in space,” and envisioned in a garden setting. Lachaise had the full-scale model cast in bronze in December 1934/January 1935, in time for inclusion, as Floating Woman, in his retrospective exhibition at the Museum of Modern Art, New York, in early 1935; the show also included a bronze cast of the refashioned statuette (now owned by the Santa Barbara Museum of Art, Santa Barbara, California). The foundry that produced the first cast of Floating Figure is unknown, although it was very likely either the Gargani or the Kunst foundry, both of which Lachaise was using around that time. The cast was donated in 1937 to the Museum of Modern Art, and was dramatically displayed in the museum’s garden for many years.

== Casts ==
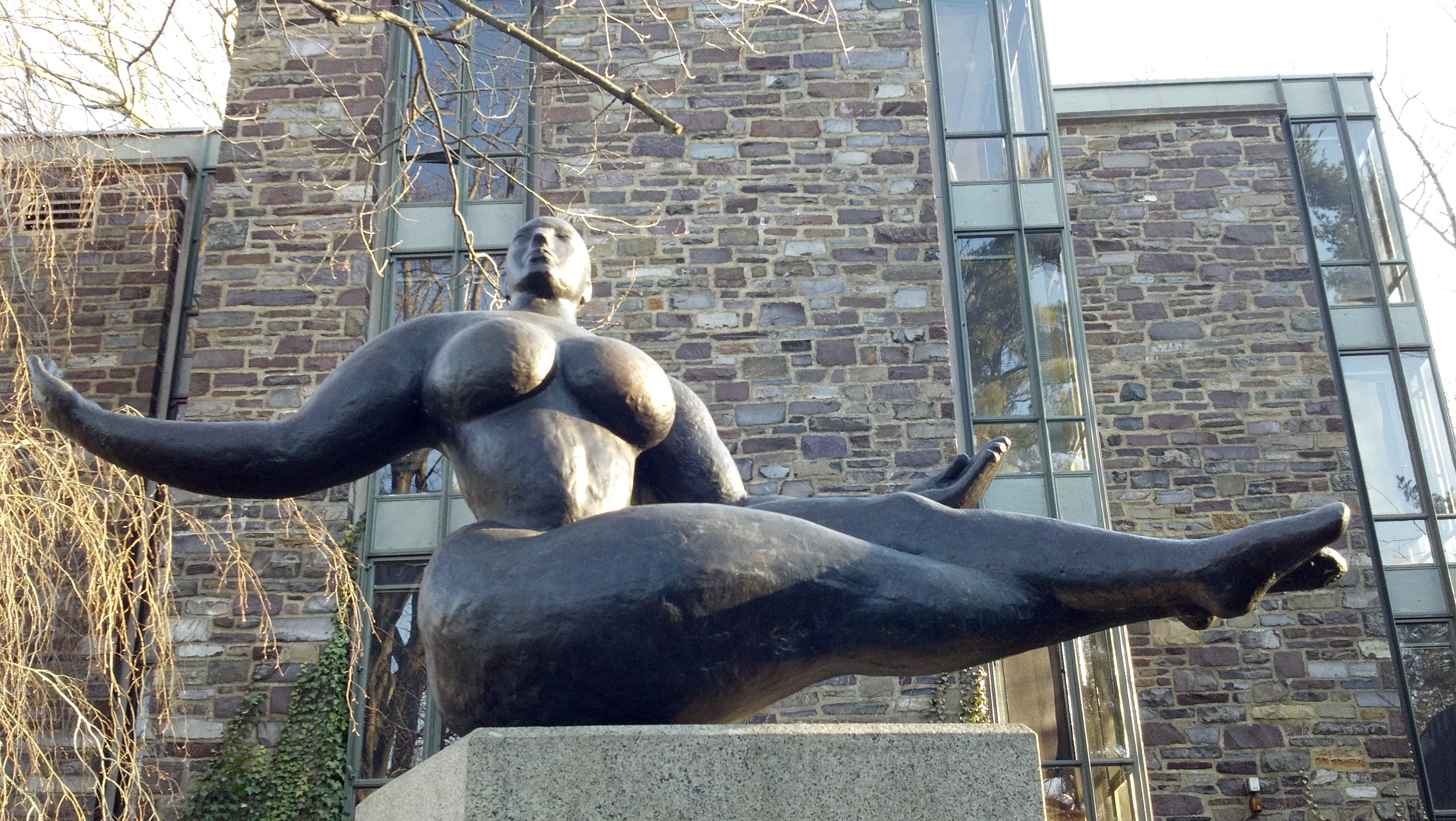
Cast of Floating Figure in the New Graduate College courtyard at Princeton University's Princeton University Graduate College.

In addition to the Museum of Modern Art cast of Floating Figure, eight bronze casts have been made. An edition of seven casts was produced between 1963 and 2005 for the Lachaise Foundation by the Modern Art Foundry in Queens, New York. The first five casts in the edition were acquired by the Society Hill Project in Philadelphia ([1/7], cast 1963), the Ray Stark Collection in Beverly Hills, California (2/7, cast by 1968), the Sheldon Museum of Art at the University of Nebraska–Lincoln in Lincoln, Nebraska (3/7, cast 1968/1969), the Putnam Collection of Sculpture at Princeton University in New Jersey (4/7, cast 1968/1969), and the National Gallery of Australia in Canberra (5/7, cast 1980). An Artist’s Proof was made in 2015 for the Lachaise Foundation, also by the Modern Art Foundry, and was donated in 2019 to the Musée d’Art Moderne de Paris.

== See also ==
- 1927 in art
