= Isabel Dutaud Nagle Lachaise =

Isabel Dutaud Nagle Lachaise (1872–1957) was an American-born, amateur poet and draftsman, and wife of sculptor Gaston Lachaise active in the early 20th century. Isabel Lachaise was his muse, model, and the primary inspiration for most of his sculptures and drawings.

== Early life and education ==
One of four children, Isabel Dutaud Nagle Lachaise was born in Cambridge, Massachusetts, on May 8, 1872, to French-Canadian parents, Joseph Duteau (also Dutaud), born in 1828 in Napierville, Quebec, Canada, and Aurelie Gendron, born in 1831 in Saint-Valentin, Quebec, Canada. The couple were married in 1849 in Saint-Valentin. Isabel's older sister Adele was born in 1855 in Saint-Alexandre, Quebec. In 1860, the family moved to the United States, settling in Danvers, Massachusetts, Joseph working as a brickmaker. Isabel's parents died a few months apart from each other in 1907.

Isabel and Adele were schooled in Paris. At the age of 20, Isabel married George B. Nagel (also Nagle), the older brother of her friend Elizabeth (“Daisy”) Nagel, at the Church of the Immaculate Conception in Revere, Massachusetts, and resided in Danvers. George was employed as a traveling salesman for an optical goods company. They had one son, Edward Nagle (1893–1963), and were divorced in 1916.

== Later life and second marriage ==
In about 1902 or 1903 while in Paris overseeing Edward's education there, Isabel met the love of her life, a French art student, Gaston Lachaise (1882–1935). After she returned home, Lachaise followed her to Boston in 1906. He pursued his art career, saw her frequently, and became a naturalized American citizen in 1917. Isabel obtained a divorce and the two were married in 1917, their wedding supper thrown by Paul Manship. Isabel and Lachaise principally resided in New York City, regularly summering in Georgetown, Maine where Isabel had gone since she was young. Under the pseudonym Isabel Cyr, (after her paternal grandmother), Isabel published a poem entitled "Invective" in The International: A Review of Two Worlds in October 1913. Under the same pseudonym, Isabel exhibited two drawings in the Society of Independent Artists exhibition of 1917. In 1922, five years after their marriage, Isabel and Lachaise purchased a summer home of their own in Georgetown, Maine. There, as well as in New York, Isabel, known as "Madame Lachaise," hosted "literary evenings" attended by friends and artists, including [Rebecca and Paul Strand], Marsden Hartley and Robert Laurent.

Both Isabel and Lachaise were dance enthusiasts, appreciating the work of artists Ruth St Denis—he created several bronze statuettes (now lost, although two plaster models still exist) of her performing several of her famous roles—and Isadora Duncan, and later Anna Pavlova and Uday Shankar. In the early 1910s, Lachaise took a series of photographs of Isabel dancing nude in the woods and lying among the rocks along the Maine coast, and he made a couple of stunning gilded bronze casts of a fanciful dancing figure representing her performing a "Hindu dance." Many of Lachaise’s sculptures he titled 'Woman' with a capital W, represent variations on an ideal inspired by Isabel, yet, according to him, only a few actually represent her. An example of the latter is his unembellished Portrait of My Wife featured in his show at the Brummer Gallery, New York, in 1928.

After Lachaise's sudden death in October 1935, Isabel spent much of the rest of her life promoting and selling his art and attending to her son, who had become mentally unstable. She died September 16, 1957, and was cremated, as had been her husband Lachaise, whose ashes she kept in an urn.

== Foundation ==
In 1963, according to Isabel's will, Isabel's great nephew John B. Pierce, Jr. (1925–2006) established the Lachaise Foundation whose mission is to protect, promote and perpetuate the artistic legacy of Gaston Lachaise for the public benefit.

== See also ==
- Floating Figure

== Sources ==
- Goodall, Donald B. (1969). Gaston Lachaise, Sculptor. Ph.D. dissertation, Cambridge, Massachusetts: Harvard University. Massachusetts: Harvard University. OCLC 12793619.
- Kramer, Hilton (1967). The Sculpture of Gaston Lachaise. New York: The Eakins Press.
- Budny, Virginia, "Gaston Lachaise's American Venus: The Genesis and Evolution of Elevation," The American Art Journal, vols. 34-35 (2003–2004), pp. 62–143. JSTOR 351057
- Budny, Virginia. "Provocative Extremes: Gaston Lachaise's Women." Sculpture Review, vol. 3, no. 2 (n.s. 14, no. 2), Summer 2014, pp. 8-19. https://www.academia.edu/51362553/Provocative_Extremes_Gaston_Lachaises_Women. Retrieved 2024-05-02.
