= Richard M. Hooley =

American theatre manager and minstrelsy manager

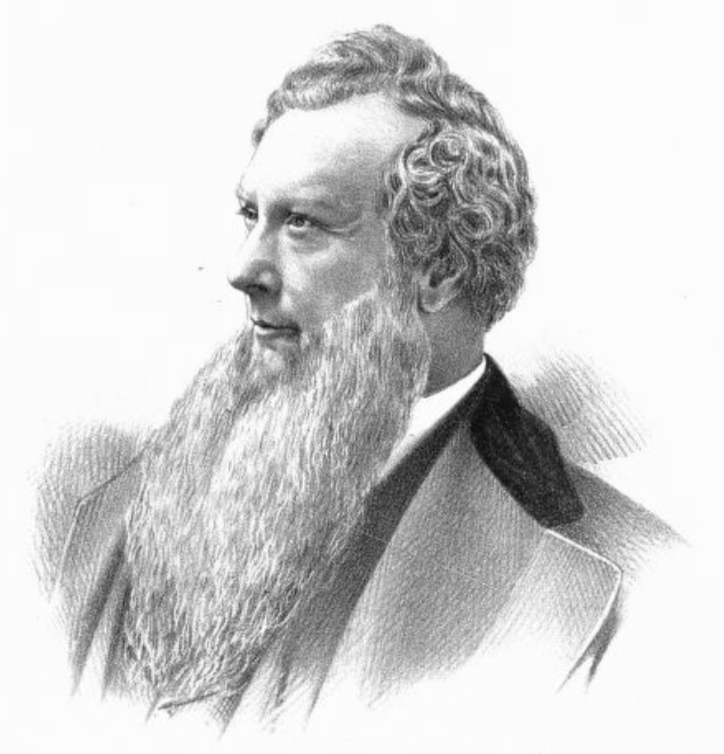
- Born: March 13, 1822; Ballina, County Mayo, Ireland
- Died: September 8, 1893 (aged 71); Chicago, Illinois, United States
- Burial place: Calvary Cemetery
- Occupation: Theatre manager
- Spouse: Rosina Cramer (m. 1856)
- Children: 2

Richard Martin Hooley (April 13, 1822 – September 8, 1893) was an American theatre manager, minstrelsy manager, and one of the earliest theatre managers in Chicago. Hooley was born in Ballina, County Mayo, Ireland, and educated in Manchester before first coming to the United States in 1844. After being associated for two years with Christy's Minstrels, he organized a blackface minstrel company and toured England, returning to the United States by 1853. In 1855 he traveled to California and took over the management of Maguire's Opera House in San Francisco.

== Brooklyn theatre ==
Hooley returned to New York around 1858, and opened a theatre in Brooklyn with Hooley's Minstrels in 1862. It was located at the southwest corner of Court and Remsen streets. Hooley sold his interest in the Brooklyn theatre (known as Hooley's Theatre or other names at other times) in 1878; the building was later demolished and replaced by Dime Savings Bank, which remained at that location until 1908.

== Madison, Wisconsin theatre ==
About 1870, Hooley, in partnership with L. B. Bryan, purchased Van Bergen's Hall, on the Dator Block, in Madison, Wisconsin, in a deal with George B. Burrows. The building, which became known as the Hooley Opera House was remodelled by John B. Hyland, a local contractor. In 1885, Hooley's Opera House was converted into apartments.

== Chicago theatres ==
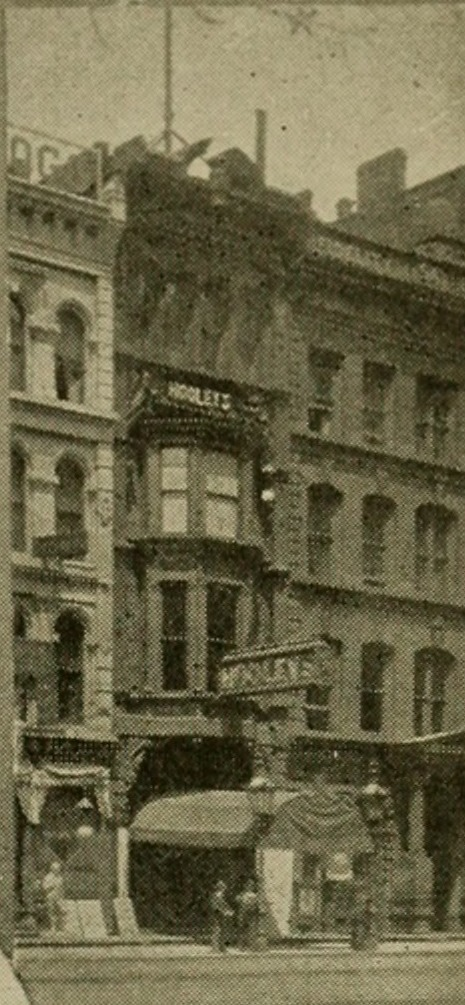
Hooley's Theatre in 1892

Hooley moved to Chicago around 1870 and opened Hooley's Opera House in January 1871. It was a venue that had previously been run as Bryan's Hall before Thomas Barbour Bryan gave Hooley a five-year lease on it. It was successful but destroyed in the Great Chicago Fire only nine months later. He then opened Hooley's Theatre in a new location in 1872, on Randolph Street east of LaSalle Street.

Hooley also organized a theatre stock company that featured actors including William H. Crane and James O'Neill.

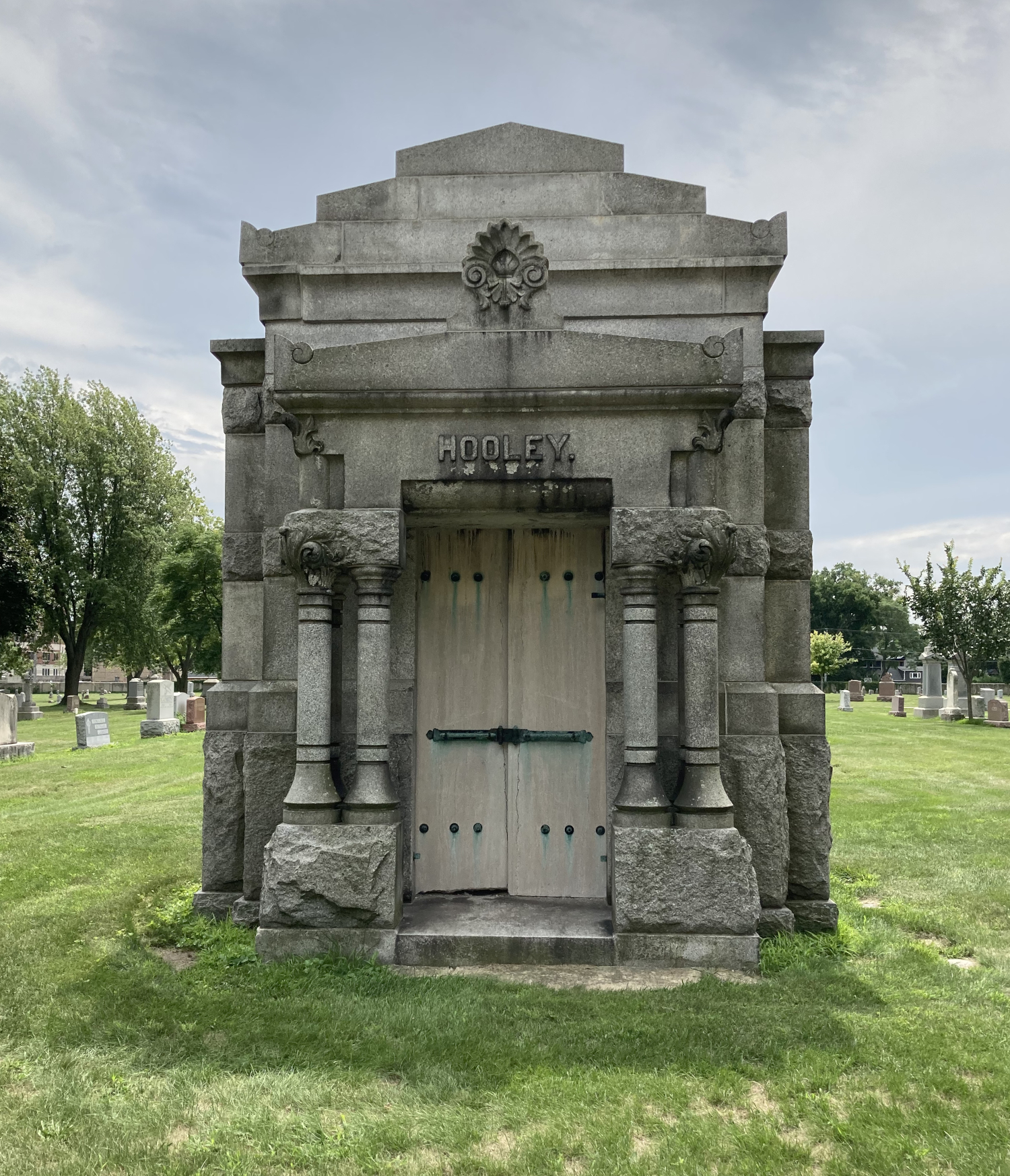
Hooley mausoleum at Calvary Cemetery

Business manager Harry J. Powers took over Hooley's Theatre in Chicago after Hooley's death in 1893. In 1898 he became full owner and renamed it as Powers' Theatre. That year, a history of Hooley's Theatre by Lyman B. Glover was published. The theatre stood until 1924, when it was demolished to accommodate an expansion of the Sherman House Hotel. The site is currently part of the land on which the James R. Thompson Center now sits.

== Personal ==
Hooley was affectionately called "Uncle Dick". He married Rosina Cramer in 1856, and died at his house in Chicago on September 8, 1893, survived by two daughters. He was interred at Calvary Cemetery in Evanston.
