= Gaston Lachaise =

American sculptor (1882–1935)

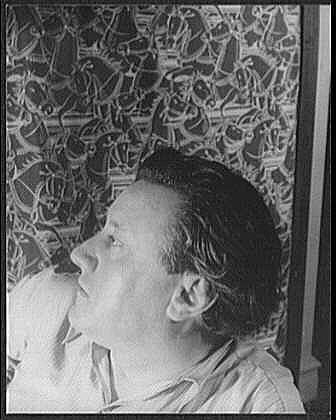
- Gaston Lachaise photographed by Carl Van Vechten, May 26, 1933
- Born: March 19, 1882; Paris, France
- Died: October 18, 1935 (aged 53)
- Education: École des Beaux-Arts
- Known for: Sculpture
- Notable work: Standing Woman (1928-30)

Gaston Lachaise (March 19, 1882 – October 18, 1935) was a French-born sculptor, active in America in the early 20th century. A native of Paris, he is most noted for his robust female nudes such as his heroic Standing Woman. Gaston Lachaise was taught the fundamentals of European sculpture while living in France. While still a student, he met and fell in love with an older American woman, Isabel Dutaud Nagle, then followed her after she returned to America. There, he became profoundly impressed by the great vitality and promise of his adopted country. Those life-altering experiences clarified his artistic vision and inspired him to define the female nude in a new and powerful manner. His drawings, typically made as ends in themselves, also exemplify his remarkably new treatment of the female body.

== Early life and education ==
Born in Paris, Lachaise was the son of Marie Barré (1856–1940) and Jean Lachaise (1848–1901), a cabinetmaker who designed furniture for the private apartment of Gustave Eiffel in the Eiffel Tower, among other commissions. At age 13 he entered a craft school, the École Municipale Bernard Palissy, where he was trained in the decorative arts, and from 1898 to 1904 he studied sculpture at the École des Beaux-Arts under Gabriel-Jules Thomas. He began his artistic career as a modeler for the French Art Nouveau designer René Lalique.

== Move to America ==
Around 1902 or 1903 he met and fell in love with Isabel Dutaud Nagle (1872–1957), a married American woman of French Canadian descent (she eventually divorced her husband and married Lachaise). When she returned to her home near Boston in 1904, Lachaise vowed to follow her. After briefly working as a modeler for the master jewelry and glass designer René Lalique in order to pay for his passage, he arrived in America in 1906, never to return to his native land. For the next fifteen years he earned a living as a sculptor's assistant. At first, in Boston and Quincy, Massachusetts, he worked for H. H. Kitson, an academic sculptor who was chiefly producing military monuments. In 1912 Lachaise moved to New York City to help Kitson in his studio at 7 MacDougal Alley. Soon after that, he went to work for the sculptor Paul Manship, while also creating his own art. His employment with Paul Manship lasted until late 1920 or early 1921. (Later examples of the work of both sculptors can be seen at Rockefeller Center.)

Lachaise rented many studios in Greenwich Village, namely 45 Washington Square South (1912–1913/1914, razed), 10 West 14th Street (1917–1919/1921, still standing), 461 6th Avenue (1921–1923, still standing), 20 West 8th Street (1924–1926, razed), 55 West 8th Street (1927–1933, still standing), and 42 Washington Mews (1933–shortly before his death, still standing). Lachaise's wife bought an old house and nearby studio in Georgetown, Maine, in 1922 and 1923, and the couple restored the buildings for use as their country home and a sculpture studio. Marsden Hartley was an occasional visitor.

In America, Lachaise developed his distinctive style and portrayal of the female nude to convey his views about the world around him and healthy, fulfilling human existence. Lachaise's ample nudes, which markedly differ from the slender type then in favor, were seen by his contemporaries as, for example, images of maturity and abundance. In the words of a later critic: "The breasts, the abdomen, the thighs, the buttocks—upon each of these elements the sculptor lavishes a powerful and incisive massiveness, a rounded voluminousness, that answers not to the descriptions of nature but to an ideal prescribed by his own emotions."

== Works ==
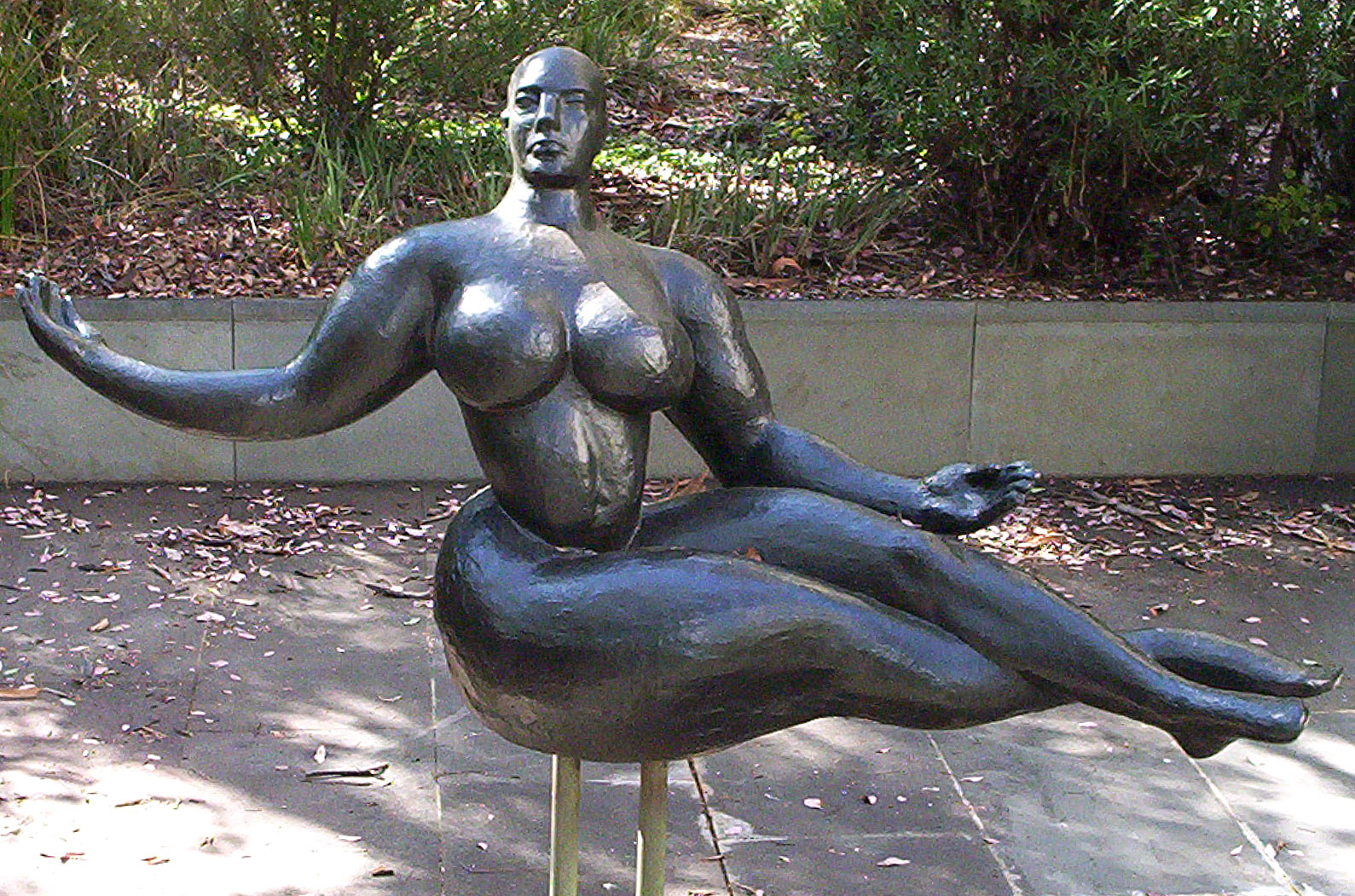
Floating Figure (model 1927), no. 5 from an edition of 7 Estate bronze casts, purchased 1978 by the National Gallery of Australia

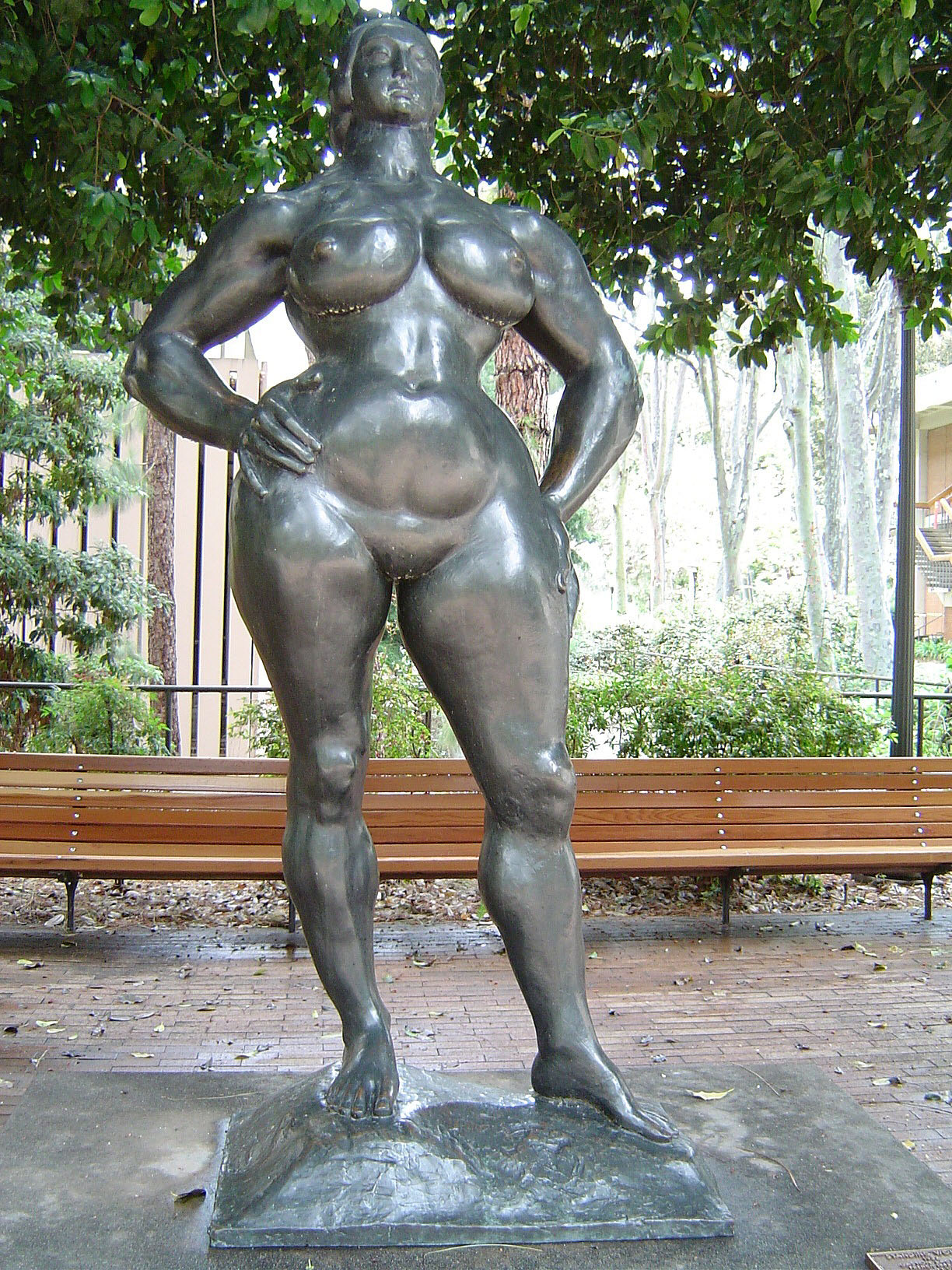
Standing Woman at UCLA, model 1928-30, copyright 1932, cast in bronze 1980

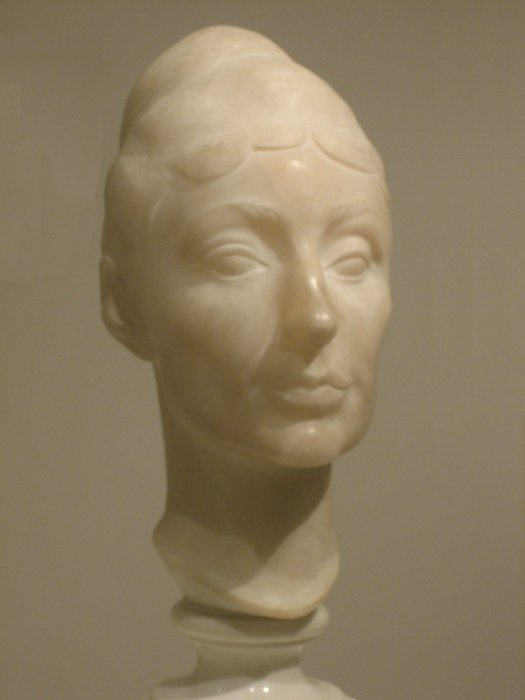
Georgia O'Keeffe (marble), completed 1927, Metropolitan Museum of Art

Lachaise's personal idiom was developed during the first decade of the twentieth century following his initial encounter with Isabel. But it was not until after he came to America, that he clearly realized his principal manifesto: his concept of "Woman" as a vital force principally inspired by his beloved. In his own words, he characterized some of his very early sculpted images of "Woman" as vigorous and robust, "radiating sex and soul," or in "forceful repose, serene and massive as earth."

Having both become an American citizen and married Isabel in 1917, Lachaise began his meteoric rise in the New York art world with his first solo show, held in 1918 at the Bourgeois Galleries. It featured the full-scale plaster model of his challenging, heroic-sized Woman (Elevation) (modeled 1912–15, copyrighted 1927, cast 1927, Art Institute of Chicago). The show also included three stone heads of women that he had directly carved in 1917, thus establishing himself as a very early practitioner of that technique in the United States. Lachaise's most famous work, Standing Woman (modeled 1928–30, copyrighted 1932, cast ca. 1933, Museum of Modern Art, New York), is perhaps the most complete expression of his principal theme: a voluptuous, energy-filled, self-possessed female nude. Lachaise is also known as a portraitist. He executed busts of literary celebrities and famous artists and literary celebrities such as Marianne Moore, Georgia O'Keeffe, John Marin, and Lincoln Kirstein. In 1935 the Museum of Modern Art in New York City held a retrospective exhibition of Lachaise's work, the first at that institution for a living American sculptor.

Gaston Lachaise was a versatile artist, technically expert in several media and accomplished with both ideal and commercial effort. His sculptures were typically carried out in bronze, although he was also passionately dedicated to carving stone. His work was chosen for several major New York architectural commissions—including those at 195 Broadway and Rockefeller Center. And the more commercial aspect of his sculptural output—the production of fountains and decorative bronzes, primarily depicting animals—also offered him financial relief. Yet Lachaise's artistic legacy is closely bound to his ideal depictions of "Woman."

Although one of America's most financially successful sculptors by 1930, largely due to wealthy, discerning patrons, Lachaise burned through most of his income by the time of his unexpected death from acute leukemia on October 18, 1935—at the height of his fame, and having been evicted from his New York studio several weeks earlier because of his failure to pay rent. His late works, which are extreme in their manipulation of human anatomy, are erotic, emotional, and avant-garde. Many of them were not seen by the public until many decades after his death, and they have encouraged a more comprehensive evaluation of his artistic achievement.

Called by ARTnews the "greatest American sculptor of his time", he played a critical role in the birth of American Modernism, pushing the boundaries of nude figuration with his innovative representations of the human body.

== Collections ==
Public collections holding his works include: United States:

- Amon Carter Museum of American Art
- Art Institute of Chicago
- Addison Gallery of American Art
- Brooklyn Museum of Art
- Cleveland Museum of Art
- Currier Museum of Art
- Detroit Institute of Arts
- Fine Arts Museums of San Francisco
- Harvard University Art Museums
- Honolulu Museum of Art
- Indiana University Art Museum
- Memorial Art Gallery
- Metropolitan Museum of Art
- Minneapolis Institute of Art
- Milwaukee Art Museum
- Museum of Fine Arts, Boston
- Museum of Modern Art
- Nasher Sculpture Center
- National Portrait Gallery
- New Mexico Museum of Art
- Pennsylvania Academy of the Fine Arts
- Phillips Collection
- Sheldon Museum of Art
- Smart Museum of Art
- Smithsonian American Art Museum
- Virginia Museum of Fine Arts
- Walker Art Center
- Worcester Art Museum

Australia:

- The Australian National Gallery, Canberra, Australia
- The National Gallery of Victoria (NGV), Melbourne, Australia

Czech Republic:

- National Gallery Prague, Veletržní Palace, Czech Republic

France:

- Musée Courbet, Ornans, France
- Musée d'Art Modern de Paris, France
- Musée d'Art et d'Industrie de Roubaix, André Diligent, "La Piscine," France

United Kingdom:

- The Tate Modern, London, UK

== Foundation ==
In 1963, according to the will of Lachaise's widow, Isabel, the Lachaise Foundation was established with the intention of perpetuating Gaston Lachaise's artistic legacy for the public benefit.

Since the founding of the Lachaise Foundation, the estate of the artist has been exclusively represented by the following galleries: Weyhe Gallery; Felix Landau Gallery and the Robert Schoelkopf Gallery (1962–1991); Salander-O'Reilly Galleries (1991–2007); Gerald Peters Gallery (2009–2013); David Findlay Jr. Gallery (2015–2016) until that gallery was acquired by Wally Findlay Galleries/ Findlay Galleries (2016-2021).

Since 2003, art historian Virginia Budny has been authoring a catalogue raisonné sponsored by the Lachaise Foundation.

== See also ==
- Floating Figure

== Sources ==
- Budny, Virginia. "Gaston Lachaise's American Venus: The Genesis and Evolution of Elevation," The American Art Journal, vols. 34-35 (2003–2004), pp. 62–143. JSTOR 351057
- Budny, Virginia. “A ‘New Eve’: Gaston Lachaise’s Portrait of Christiana Morgan [LF 168].” Archon (The Governor’s Academy, Byfield, Mass.), Fall, 2009, pp. 10–13. https://www.academia.edu/83869712/_A_New_Eve_Gaston_Lachaise_s_portrait_of_Christiana_Morgan_LF_168_?email_work_card=interaction-paper. Retrieved 2024–06–20.
- Budny, Virginia. "Provocative Extremes: Gaston Lachaise's Women." Sculpture Review, vol. 3, no. 2 (n.s. 14, no. 2), Summer 2014, pp. 8–19. https://www.academia.edu/51362553/Provocative_Extremes_Gaston_Lachaises_Women. Retrieved 2024–06–19.
- Budny, Virginia. Gaston Lachaise: For the Love of Woman, exhibition catalogue, New York: Bernard Goldberg Fine Arts, LLC, 2016, Figs. 5, 6, pp. 5, 20-23, 40. https://www.academia.edu/96303195/Gaston_Lachaise_For_the_Love_of_Woman.
- Budny, Virginia. (2026, September 4). Lachaise and the Historic Woodstock Art Colony – Part 1. Learning Woodstock Art Colony. https://www.learningwoodstockartcolony.com/post/lachaise-and-the-historic-woodstock-art-colony-part-1.
- Kramer, Hilton (1967). The Sculpture of Gaston Lachaise. New York: The Eakins Press.
- Lachaise, Gaston. "A Comment on My Sculpture." Creative Art, vol. 3, no. 2, August 1928, pp. xxiii–xxvi.
- Museum of Modern Art, New York, Gaston Lachaise: Retrospective Exhibition. Exhibition catalogue. New York: The Museum, 1935. https://assets.moma.org/documents/moma_catalogue_1994_300061878.pdf. Retrieved 2024–06–19.
- New York Herald Tribune Reporter. "Lachaise Finds Museum Open to Giant Nudes ...." New York Herald Tribune (New York, N.Y.). January 14, 1935, p. 7. Interview with Lachaise.
- Rosenfeld, Paul. "Habundia." The Dial, vol. 81, no. 3, September 1926, pp. 215–19. On Lachaise's sculpture. https://babel.hathitrust.org/cgi/pt?id=uc1.b2924823&seq=7. Retrieved 2024–06–19.
