= Cram and Ferguson Architects =

American architecture firm

Cram and Ferguson Architects LLC
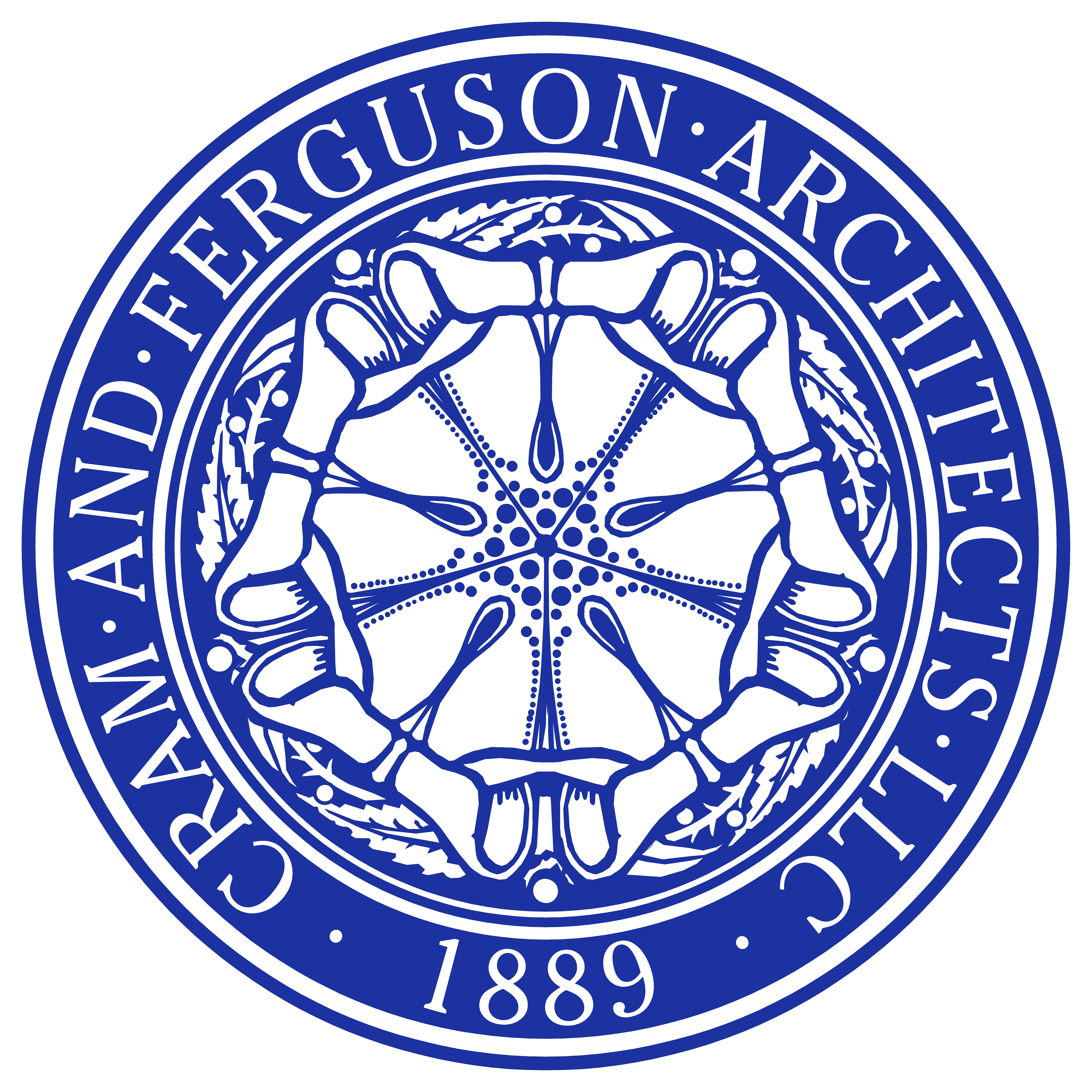
- Formerly: Cram and Wentworth (1889-1890) Cram, Wentworth and Goodhue (1890-1905) Cram, Goodhue and Ferguson (1905-14) Cram and Ferguson (1914-1958) Hoyle, Doran and Berry (1958-92) HDB/Cram and Ferguson (1992-2008) Cram and Ferguson LLC (2008–present)
- Type: Limited Liability Company
- Founded: 1889
- Founder: Ralph Adams Cram
- Headquarters: Concord, Massachusetts, United States
- Products: Architectural design
- Owner: Ethan Anthony AIA
- Website: https://www.cramandferguson.com/

Cram and Ferguson Architects is an architecture firm based in Concord, Massachusetts. The company was founded as a partnership in 1889 by the "preeminent American Ecclesiastical Gothicist" Ralph Adams Cram and Charles Francis Wentworth. In 1890 they were joined by Bertram Goodhue, who was made a partner in 1895.

The firm name has changed as partners have changed and names have included: Cram and Wentworth, Cram Goodhue and Wentworth, Cram Goodhue and Ferguson, Cram and Ferguson, Cram and Ferguson Architects, Hoyle, Doran and Berry and HDB/Cram and Ferguson all successor firms to the original partnership of Ralph Adams Cram and Charles Francis Wentworth.

Frank Ferguson, their structural engineer, was made a partner on Wentworth's death in 1905 making the firm one of the earliest A/E firms. Hoyle, Doran and Berry, Inc. the partnership formed by Alexander Hoyle and John Doran continuing the unbroken succession descending from original Cram collaborators in 1958, HDB/Cram and Ferguson was the partnership of David H. Hulihan long time employee of Cram and Ferguson and Ethan Anthony AIA. That partnership was reformed in 2008 on the retirement of President David H. Hulihan and the firm reverted to its traditional name of Cram and Ferguson Architects under the leadership of Ethan Anthony AIA.

In 1931, in Cram's waning years, Arthur Tappan North wrote in his Monograph on the firm's work:

Some architectural styles such as the Gothic manifestations in several countries, were invented for and dedicated to a specific use which has continued to this day in the original or modified forms. It was this continuity of use that was the basis of the conception of Cram and Wentworth and their successors, including Cram and Ferguson, of the ideal American church. A consistent adherence to this ideal did not in any manner prevent their work assuming a wide range of individual expressions, a testimony to their extensive knowledge and understanding, liberally expressed. Among a very small number of American Architects, Ralph Adams Cram is a distinguished contributor to (architectural) literature, not confined to the purely technical aspects of architecture but to it sociological and philosophical attributes. Dr. Cram is equally distinguished for his contributions to architecture, which, although predominantly ecclesiastical in character, embrace many building projects of different types. While he has always been recognized as the senior member of the firm, he has always unselfishly accorded to his associates a full measure of credit for their cooperation and equal contributions to its successes.

— Arthur Tappan North

Since 1990 Cram and Ferguson under the leadership of the American Architect; Ethan Anthony is completing new church and academic work including: the St. Thomas Aquinas University Church at the University of Virginia at Charlottesville, The Shrine of Our Lady of Good Voyage at Boston Seaport, Massachusetts and the St. Kateri Tekakwitha Catholic Church at Ridgway, Illinois. Major work the last fifteen years, the Benedictine Monastery of Syon Abbey on the Blue Ridge Parkway in Floyd, Virginia, The Phillips Chapel at the Canterbury School in Greensboro, North Carolina and The Edward's Chapel at The Casady School in Oklahoma City, Oklahoma.

== Historic projects ==
=== Religious architecture ===
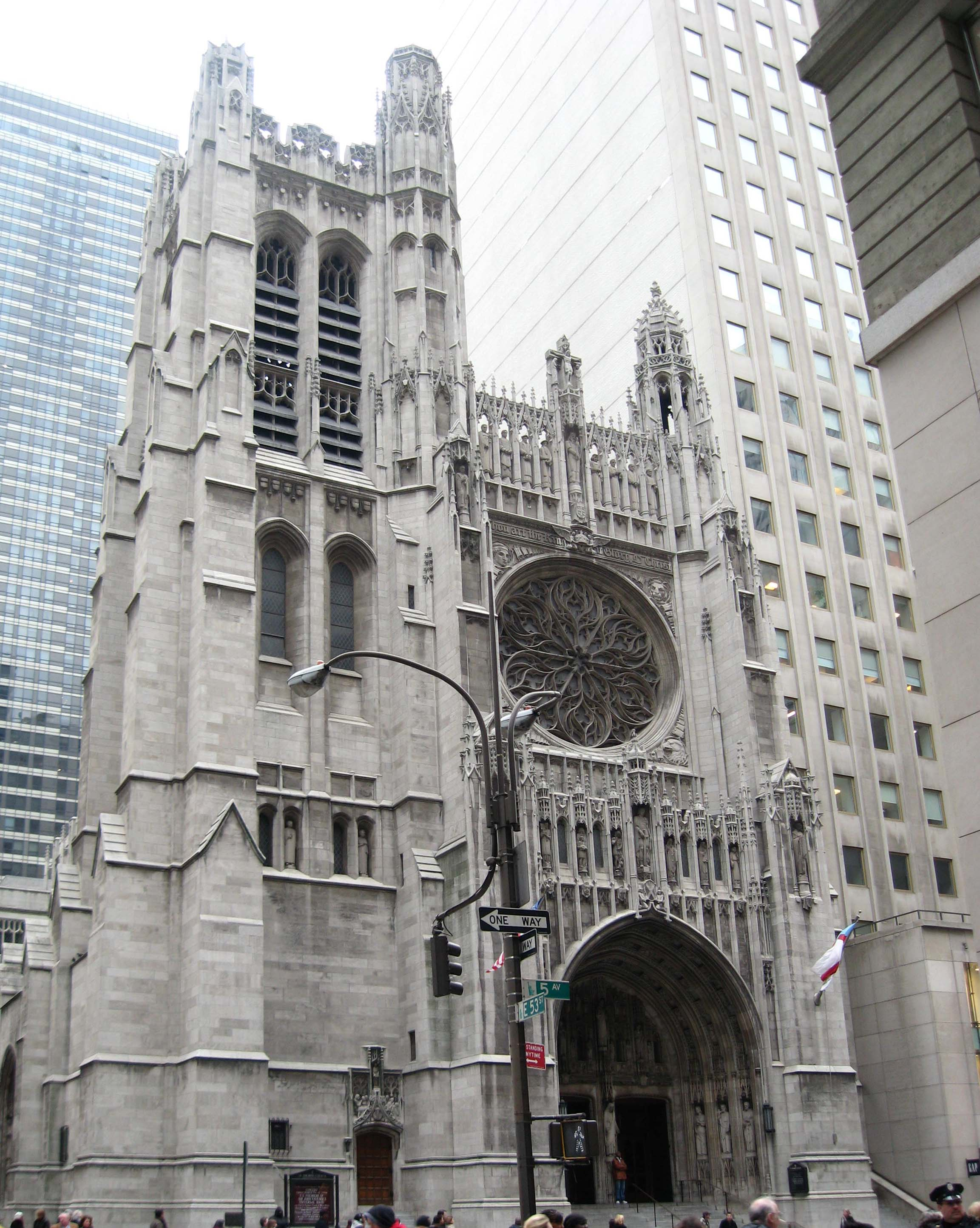
St. Thomas Church, New York, NY, 1907

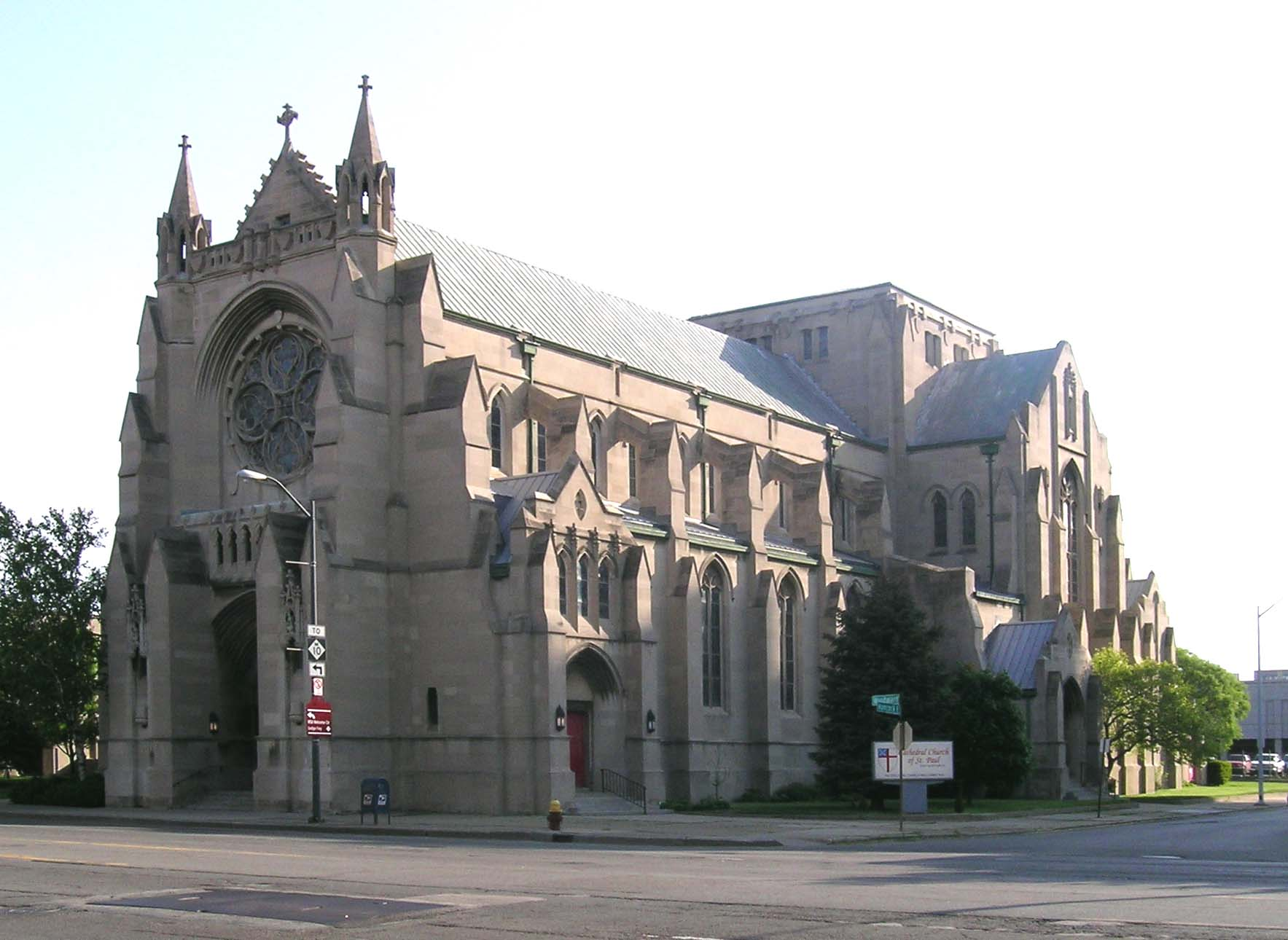
The Cathedral Church of St. Paul in Detroit, MI, 1908-11

- All Saints Church Ashmont – Dorchester, MA, 1891
- Saint Paul's Episcopal Church – Brockton, MA, 1891-94
- Swedenborgian Church, 1893 – Newton, MA
- Church of Saint Peter and Paul – Fall River, MA, 1893
- Christ Church – Hyde Park, MA, 1893
- St. Luke's Church – Roxbury, MA, 1895
- Second Congregational Church (Phillips Church) – Exeter, NH, 1895-98
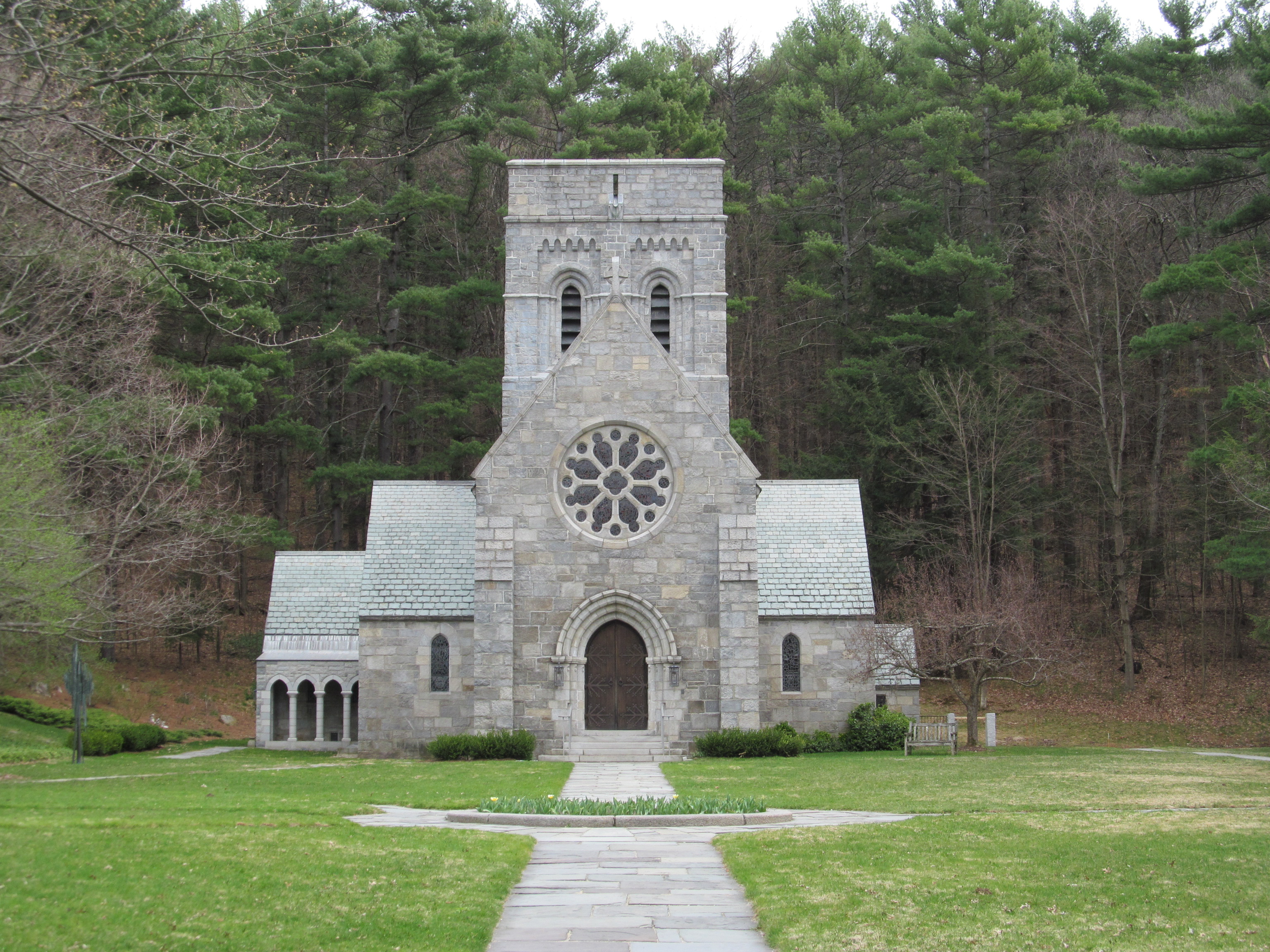
  All Saints Church, Peterborough, NH, 1913–21
- St. Stephen's Episcopal Church – Cohasset, MA, 1899
- Emmanuel Church – Newport, RI, 1900
- St. Paul's Episcopal Church – Chicago, IL, 1902
- First Baptist Church – Pittsburgh, PA, 1902
- All Saints' Chapel, University of the South – Sewanee, TN, 1903
- Christ Church Cathedral Competition (project) – Victoria, British Columbia, 1903
- St. John in the Wilderness Episcopal Cathedral (project) – Denver, CO, 1903
- First Unitarian Church – West Newton, MA, 1905
- Westminster Presbyterian Church – Springfield, IL, 1905
- All Saints Cathedral – Halifax, Nova Scotia, 1906
- Calvary Episcopal Church – Pittsburgh, PA, 1906
- Glens Falls Presbyterian Church – Glens Falls, NY, 1906
- St. Thomas Episcopal Church – New York, NY, 1907
- Trinity Memorial Church (now St. Andrew's) – Denver, CO, 1907
- Church of the Covenant – Cleveland, OH, 1907
- St. Paul's Episcopal Cathedral – Detroit, MI, 1908-11
- Church and Rectory (project) – Guantanamo, Cuba, 1908
- Russell Sage Memorial First Presbyterian Church – Far Rockaway, NY, 1908
- St. Mary's Church – Walkerville, Ontario, 1904
- Cathedral of the Incarnation (project) – Diocese of Baltimore, MD, 1908
- Church of the Ascension – Montgomery, AL, 1910
- St. James Episcopal Church – New York, NY, 1911-24
- St. Paul's Episcopal Church – Malden, MA, 1911
- Grace Episcopal Church Parish House – Manchester, NH, 1911
- House of Hope Presbyterian Church – St. Paul, MN, 1916-26
- Fourth Presbyterian Church – Chicago, IL, 1912
- Church of the New Jerusalem – Bryn Athyn, PA 1912
- First Presbyterian Church – Oakland, CA, 1912-13
- All Saints Episcopal Church – Peterborough, NH, 1913-21
- Trinity Episcopal Church (addition) – Princeton, NJ, 1914
- Chapel for the Sisters of St. Anne – Arlington, MA, 1914
- St. Elizabeth Chapel at Whitehall – Sudbury, MA, 1914
- First Universalist Church – Somerville, MA, 1916
- Ellingwood Funerary Chapel – Nahant, MA, 1919
- First Presbyterian Church, Greensburg, PA, 1919
- St. James Church – Lake Delaware, NY, 1920
- Trinity Episcopal Church – Houston, TX, 1920
- Sacred Heart Church – Jersey City, NJ, 1921
- Central Union Church – Honolulu, HI, 1922
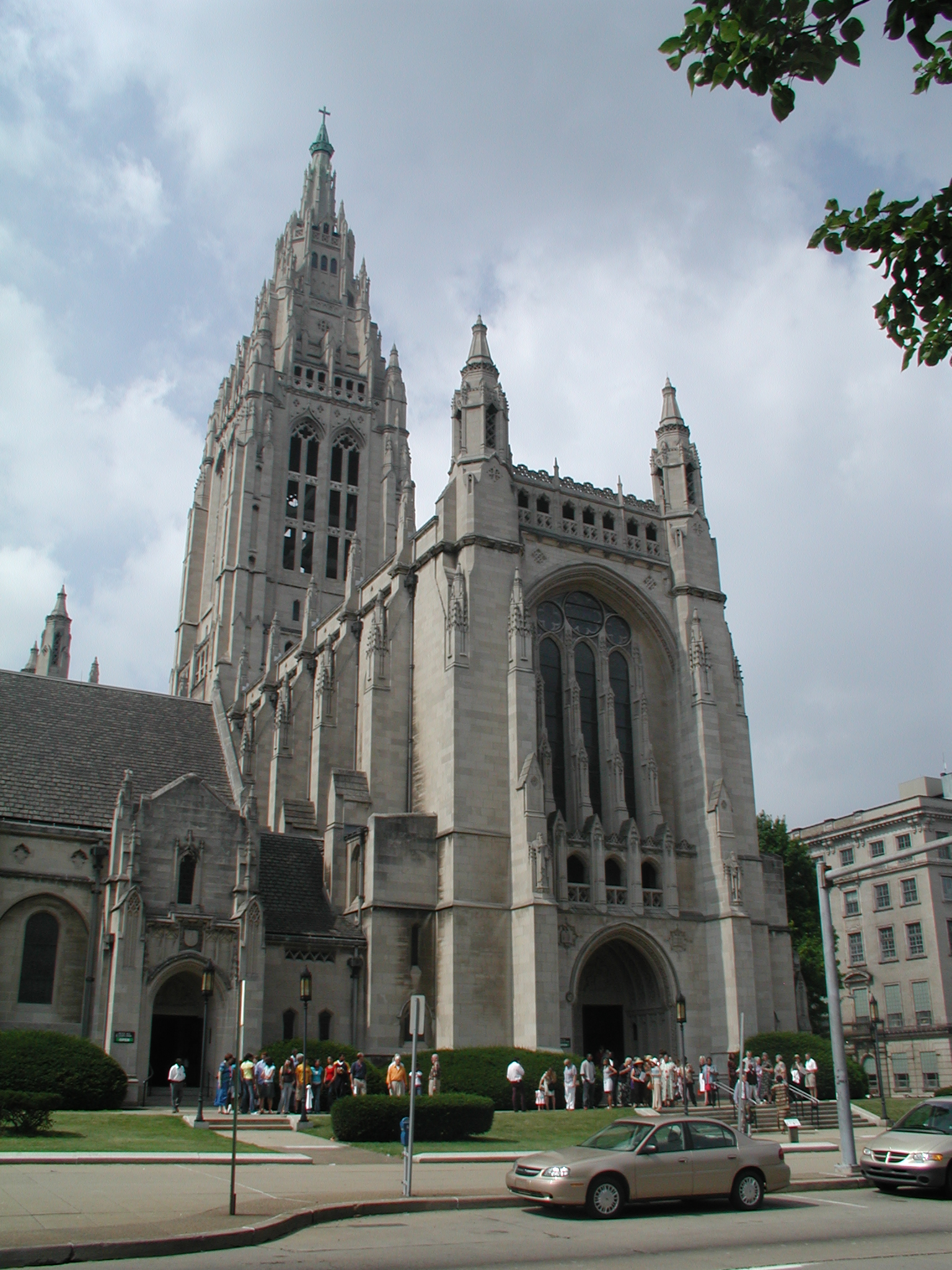
- East Liberty Presbyterian Church, Pittsburgh, PA, 1931
  First Presbyterian Church – Tacoma, WA, 1923
- Trinity Methodist Episcopal Church – Durham, NC, 1923
- First Presbyterian Church – Jamestown, NY, 1923
- St. Paul's Episcopal Church – Yonkers, NY, 1924
- Cathedral of St. John the Divine – New York, NY, 1925-31
- St. Mary's Catholic Church – Detroit, MI, 1925
- Emmanuel Church (project) – Rockford, IL, 1927
- St. Paul's Church – Winston-Salem, NC 1927
- American Church of Paris – Paris, France, 1927
- St. Florian's Church – Detroit, MI, 1928
- Prince Memorial Chapel (project) – Fort Myer, VA, 1929
- St. Vincent's Church – Los Angeles, CA, 1927
- Christ Church – United Methodist Church – New York, NY, 1929
- All Saints Episcopal Church (addition) – Brookline, MA, 1929
- Klise Memorial Chapel East Congregational UCC Church – Grand Rapids, MI, 1929
- Mishawaka Cathedral (project) – Mishawaka, IN, 1930
- East Liberty Presbyterian Church – Pittsburgh, PA, 1931
- Second Unitarian Church – Boston, MA, 1934
- Blank Church (project) – Chicago, IL, 1935
- Conventual Church of Sts. Mary and John – Cambridge, MA, 1936
- All Saints Episcopal Church – Winter Park, FL, 1938
- St. Thomas Church – Peoria, IL, 1939

=== Academic architecture ===
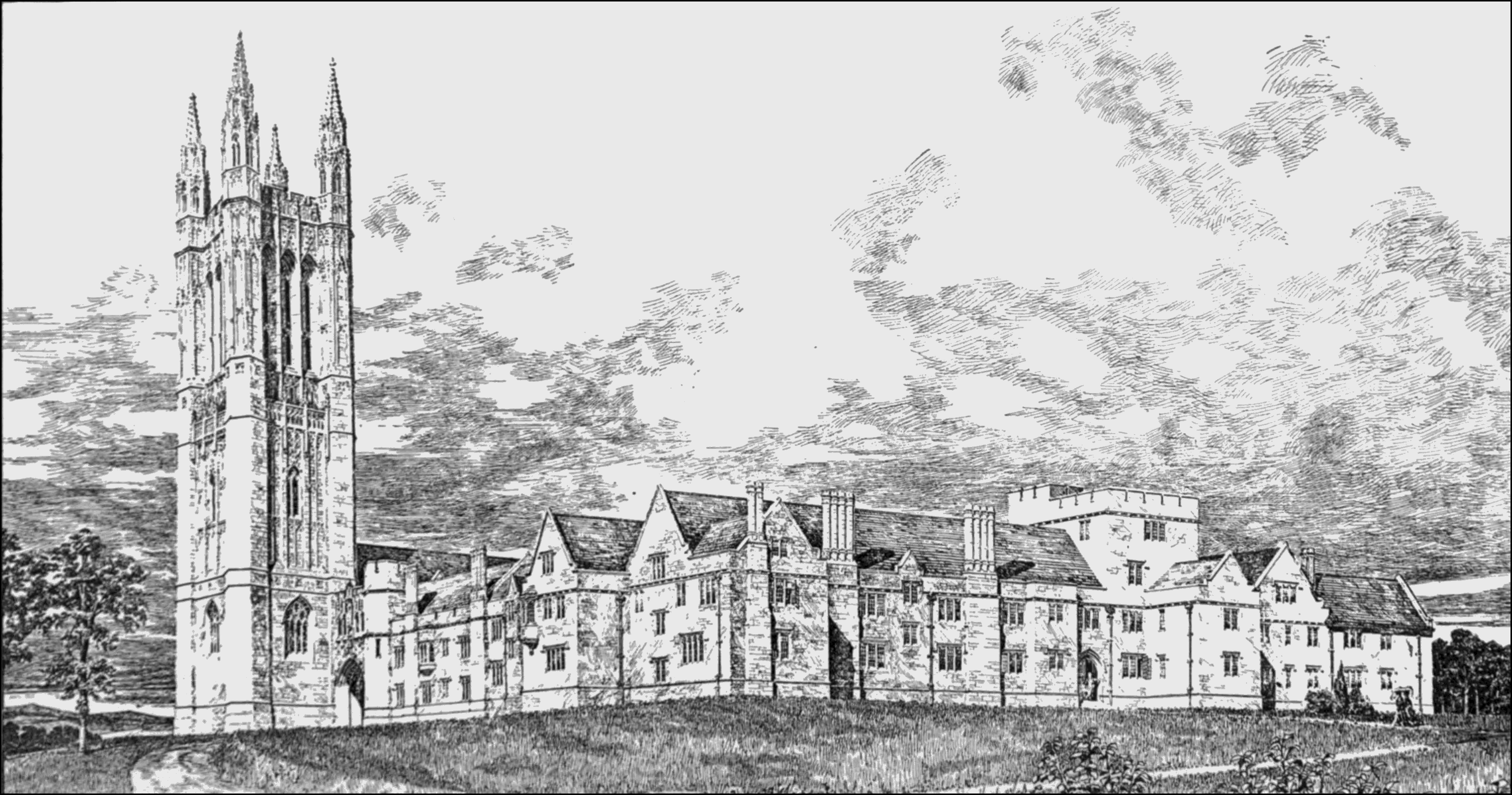
Princeton University Graduate College Design, 1913

- Wheaton College – Norton, MA, 1898-1932
  - Wallace Library
  - Cole Memorial Chapel
  - Kilham Hall
- Sweet Briar College – Sweet Briar, VA, 1902-66
- United States Military Academy – West Point, NY, 1904-1923
  - Cadet Chapel
  - Headquarters Building
- Princeton University – Princeton, NJ, 1906-29
  - Graduate College
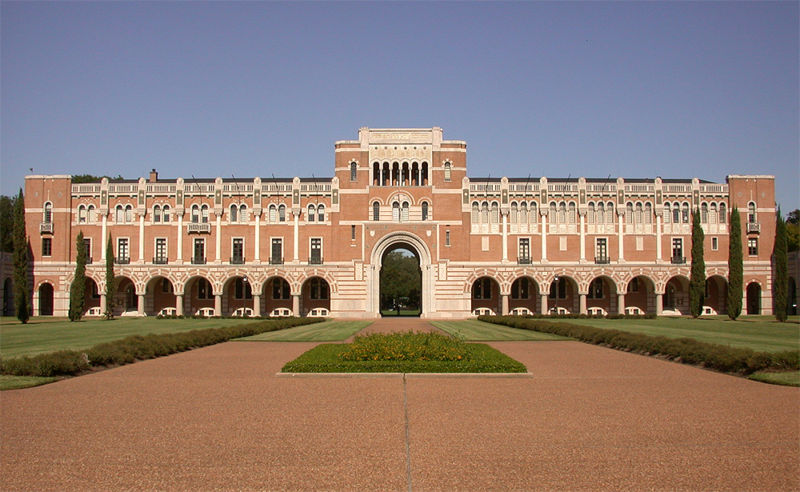
  - Lovett Hall at Rice University
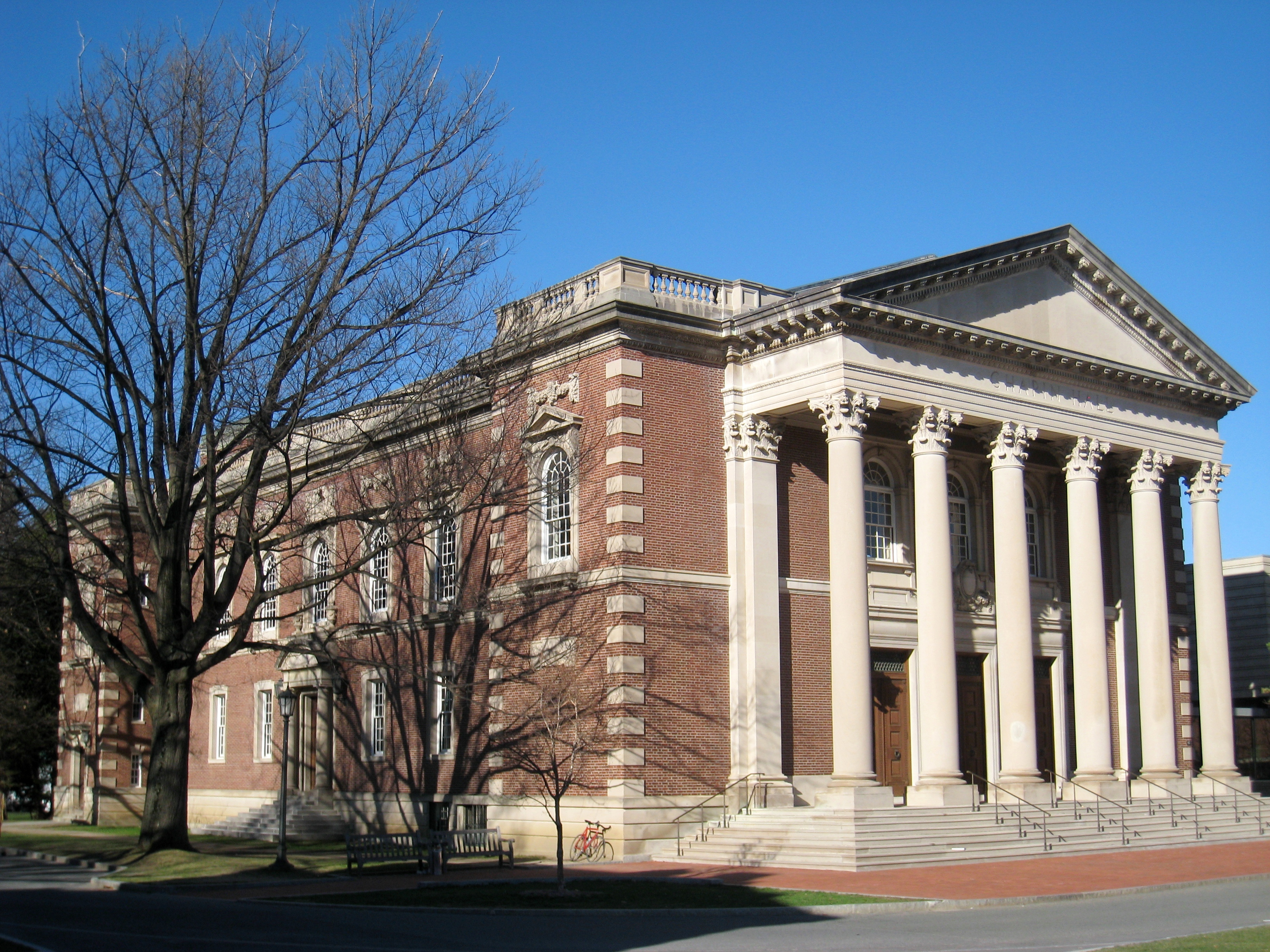
    Williams College, Chapins Hall
    Proctor Hall
  - University Chapel
  - Cleveland Tower
  - Campbell Hall
  - McCormick School of Art and Architecture
- Rice University – Houston, TX, 1908-57
  - Administration Building (Lovett Hall)
  - Campus Master Plan
  - Mechanical Engineering Laboratory
- Westhampton College, University of Richmond – Richmond, VA, 1910-16
- St. Mary's School – Peekskill, NY, 1911
- Phillips Exeter Academy – Exeter, NH, 1911-37
  - Dormitories
- Williams College – Williamstown, MA, 1912-38
  - Williams Hall
  - Chapins Hall
  - Stetson Hall Library
  - Sage Hall
  - Gate between William and Sage
  - Mears House
  - Lehman Hall
  - Heating Plant
  - Adams Memorial Theatre
  - Fayerweather Hall
- Mercersburg Academy Chapel – Mercersburg, PA, 1916-26
- The Masters School – Dobbs Ferry, NY, 1919
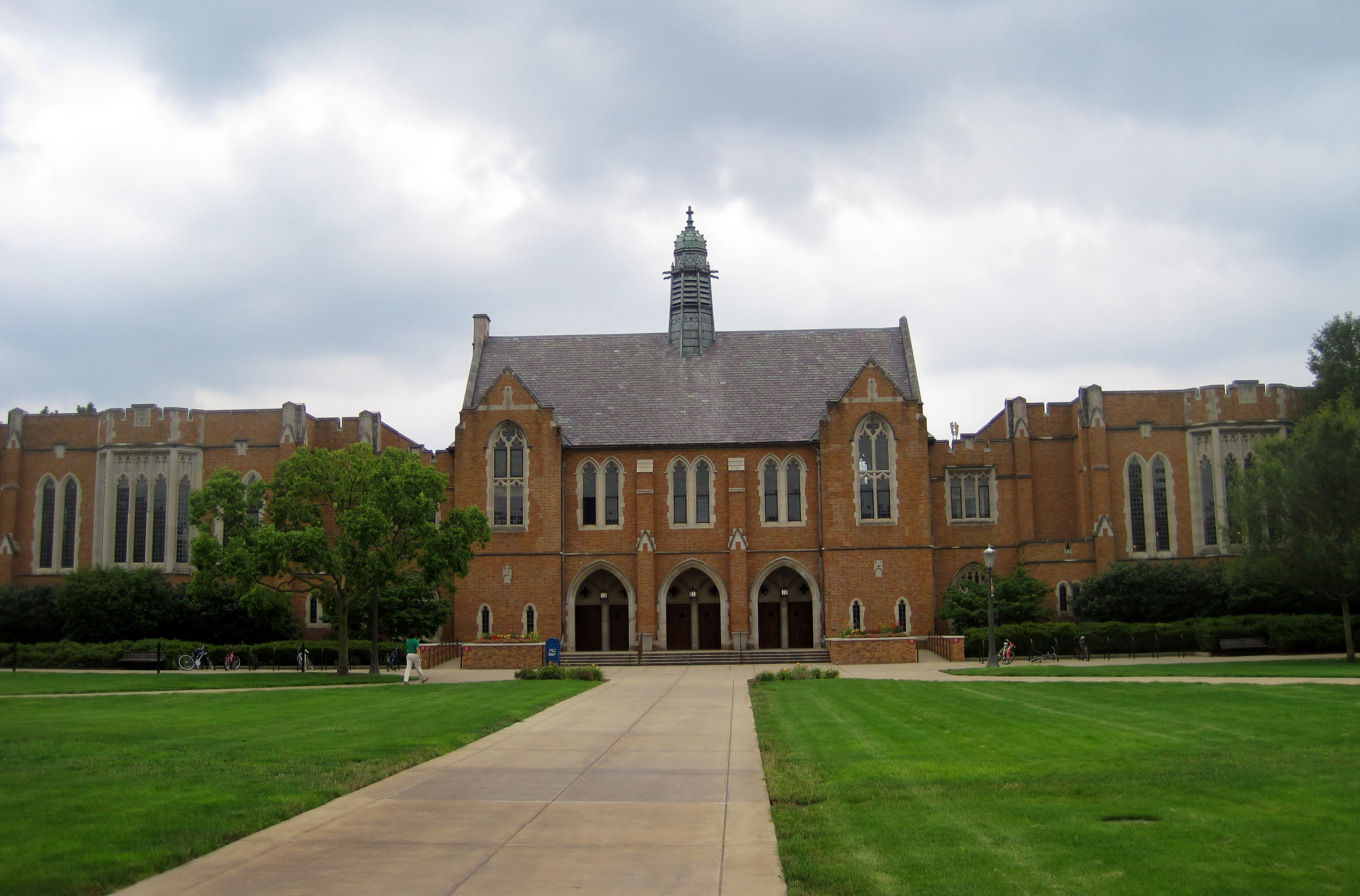
  *University of Notre Dame, South Dining Hall
- Tsuda University – Hokkaido, Japan, 1919
- Dominican University – River Forest, IL, 1920
- St. George's Chapel – Newport, RI, 1923-29
- Choate School – Wallingford, CT, 1924-25
- University of Notre Dame, South Dining Hall – South Bend, Indiana, 1927
- St. Paul's School – Concord, NH, 1927-37
- St. Alban's Choir School – Washington, D.C., 1929
- Gibson Chapel, The Blue Ridge School – Dyke, VA, 1929
- Rollins College Chapel – Winter Park, FL, 1930
- University of Southern California, Doheny Library – Los Angeles, CA, 1930
- Wellesley College – Wellesley, MA, 1930
- Boston University – Boston, MA, 1930-66
- St. Mary's High School and Grammar School – Glens Falls, NY, 1930
- Swarthmore College – Swarthmore, PA, 1938

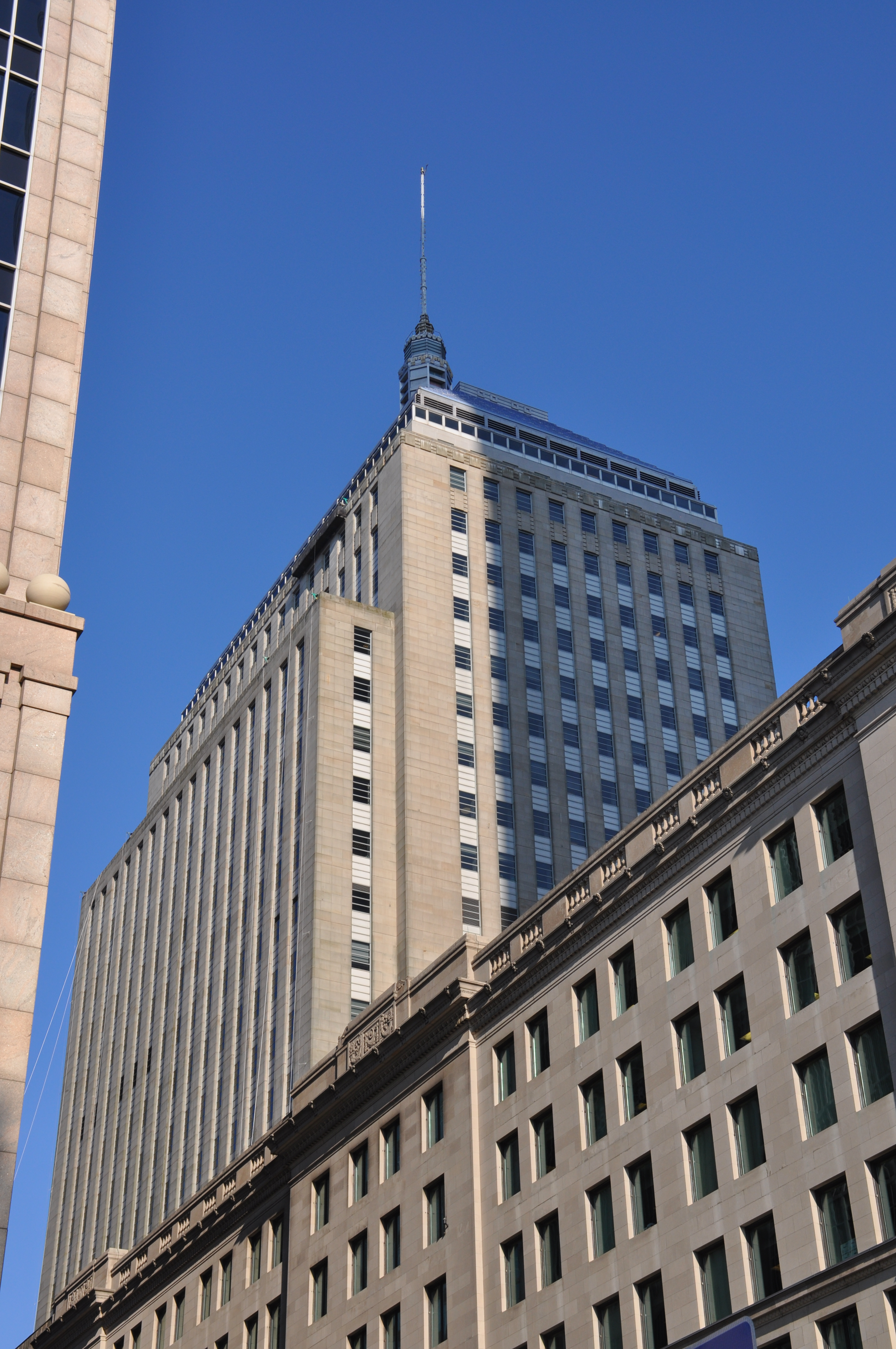
John Hancock Building, Boston, MA

=== Residential, institutional, and commercial architecture ===
- Eddy Residence – Newton, MA, 1888
- Edward Courtland Gale Residence – Williamstown, MA, 1890
- Kennedy Road – Cambridge, MA, 1890
- Eugene Fellner Residence – Brookline, MA, 1890
- 126 and 128 Brattle Street – Cambridge MA, 1892
- 165 Winthrop Street – Brookline, MA, 1892
- Bushy Hill – Simsbury, CT, 1893
- Richmond Court Apartments – Brookline, MA, 1898
- Harbor Court – Newport, RI, 1904
- Charles Barron Residence – Beacon Street, Boston, MA, 1907
- House on the Moors – Gloucester, MA, 1917
- Blanche Sewall Residence – Houston, TX, 1924
- Paul Watkins House – Winona, MN, 1925
- Angelica Livingston Gerry Residence – Lake Delaware, NY, 1926
- Chickamauga Memorial Arch – Chickamauga, TN, 1897
- Washington Hotel – Colon, Panama, 1910
- Edward Courtland Gale Mausoleum – Troy, NY, 1914
- Woodrow Wilson Memorial – Washington DC, 1925
- Memorial Chapel, American Military Cemetery – Belleau Wood, France, 1926
- World War I Memorial Carillon – Richmond, VA, 1926
- Oise-Aisne American Military Cemetery Memorial – Fère-en-Tardenois, France, 1926
- Deborah Cook Sayles Public Library – Pawtucket, RI, 1893
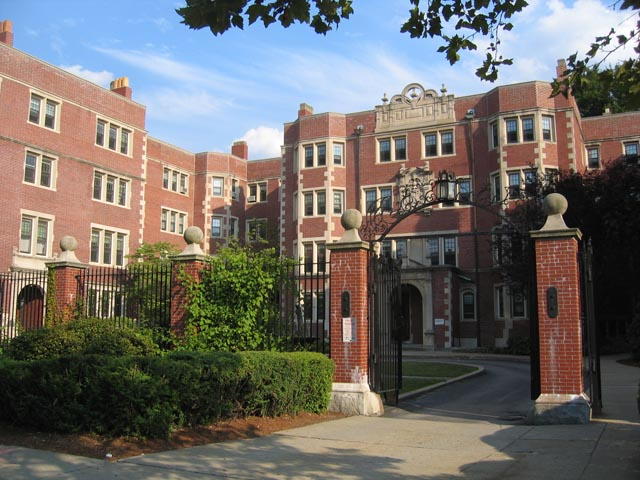
- Richmond Court, Brookline, MA
  Public Library – Fall River, MA, 1899
- Hunt Library – Nashua, NH, 1902
- Lucius Beebe Memorial Library – Wakefield, MA, 1921
- Houston Public Library – Houston, TX, 1926
- Parker Hill Branch, Boston Public Library – Roxbury, MA, 1929
- National Life Insurance Building – Montpelier, VT, 1921
- McCormack Federal Building – Boston, MA, 1929
- Portsmouth Harbor Front Renewal – Portsmouth, NH, 1933
- District Court Building – Dedham, MA, 1937
- Holy Cross Monastery – West Park, NY, 1934
- Bourne and Sagamore Bridges – Cape Cod, MA, 1938
- New England Mutual Life Insurance Headquarters – Boston, MA, 1938
- The People's Savings Bank – Providence, RI, 1944
- The John Hancock Life Insurance Company Headquarters Building – Boston, MA, 1946
- Currier Museum of Art in Manchester, New Hampshire
- The Berkeley Building, 200 Berkeley Street, Boston, Massachusetts
- The Aid Association for Lutherans Building, 222 W College Avenue, Appleton, Wisconsin, 1952.
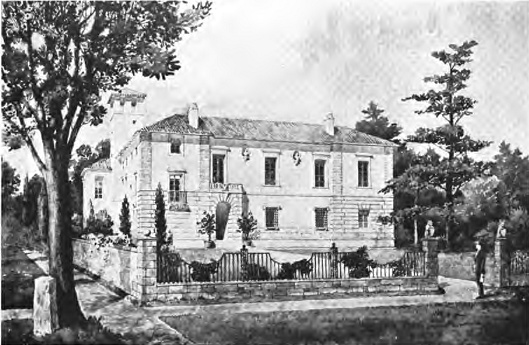
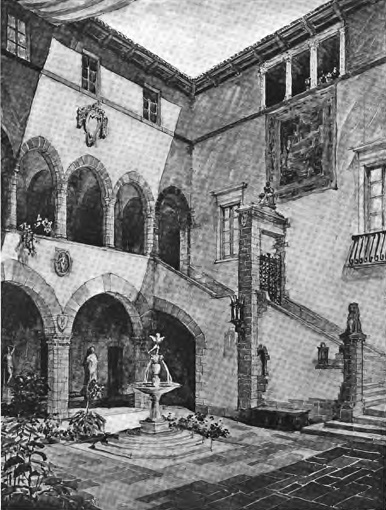
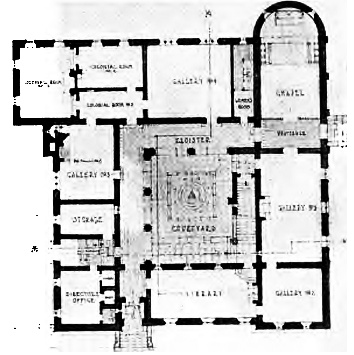
Illustrations and floor plan from the 1920 proposal for the Currier Art Gallery in Manchester, New Hampshire.

== Recent projects ==
- Phillips Academy Renovations, Phillips Church- Exeter, NH, 2000
- Cathedral of Our Lady of Walsingham – Houston, TX, 2000
- All Saints' Church Peterborough (Addition) – Peterborough, NH, 2000
- Canterbury School Bell Tower – Greensboro, NC, 2000
- Casady School – Oklahoma City, OK, 2001
  - West Transept
  - St. Edwards Chapel, 2012
- Records Mausoleum – Oklahoma City, OK, 2002
- Gale Mausoleum Restoration – Troy, NY, 2002
- St. John Neumann Catholic Church – Knoxville, TN, 2005
- St. Andrews Episcopal Church Restoration – Denver, CO, 2009
- The Bradford Mill, "Wheelhouse" Project – Concord, MA, 2010
- Valley of Our Lady Monastery Design – Prairie Du Sac, WI, 2011
- Church of the Incarnation – Dallas, TX, 2012
- Hunt Memorial Building Restoration – Nashua, NH, 2012
- The Church of the Open Word Preservation – Newton, MA, 2014
- St. Kateri Tekakwitha Parish – Ridgeway, IL, 2015
- The Shrine of Our Lady of Good Voyage – Boston Seaport, MA, 2017
- Sister of St. Thomas Aquinas – Brooksville, FL, 2019
- Emmanuel Baptist Church Restoration – Worcester, MA, 2019
- St. Andrew's Catholic Church: Myrtle Beach, South Carolina; Renovations; 2022
- St. Timothy's Episcopal Church; Additions and Renovations; 2022
- Church of the Incarnation; Highlands, North Carolina; Facility Renovation 2023
- Trinity Presbyterian Church - Multipurpose Roon, Narthex and Worship Space Interior Design and Fitup 2022

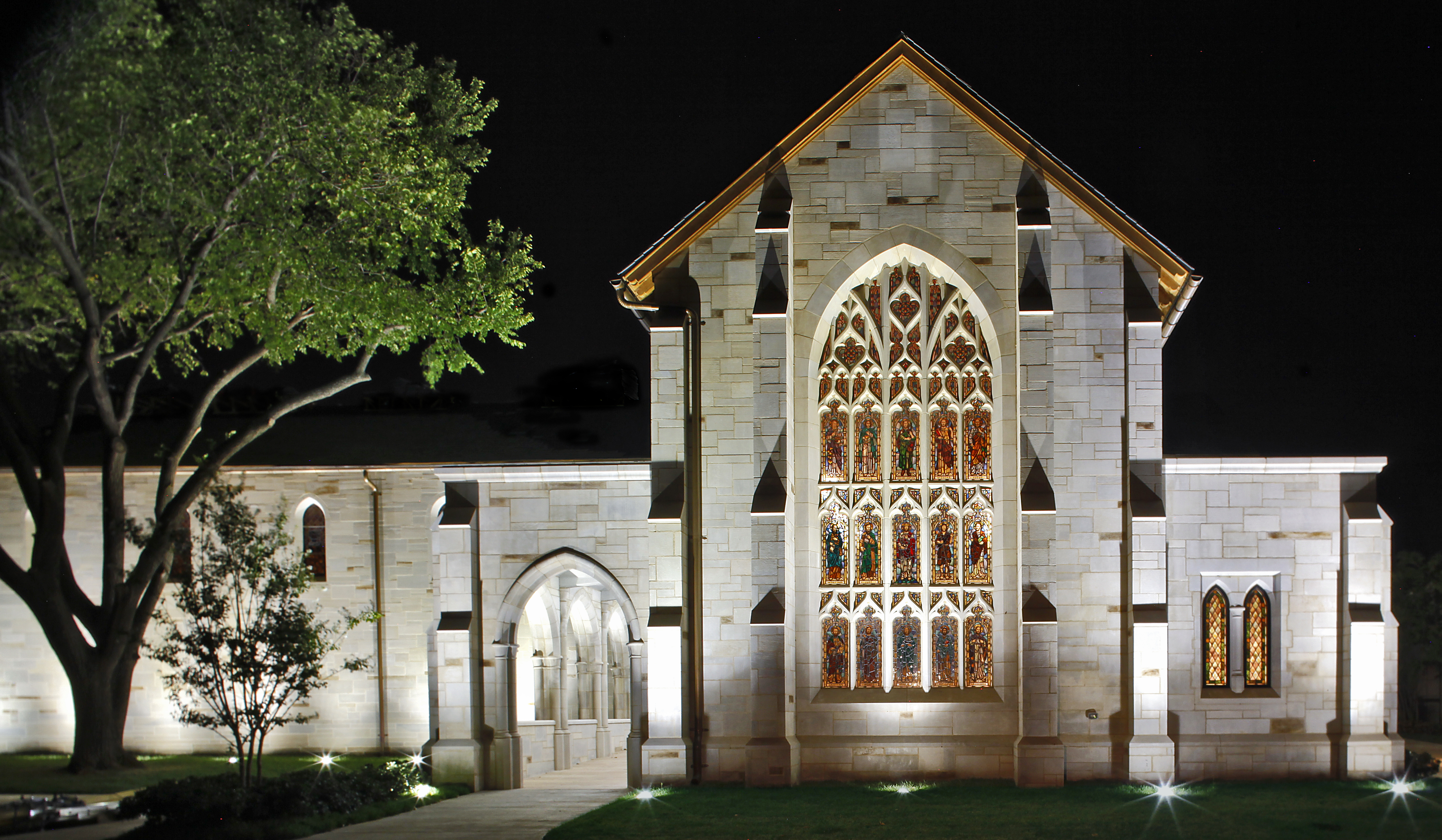
St. Edward's Chapel, The Casady School, Olklahoma city, OK

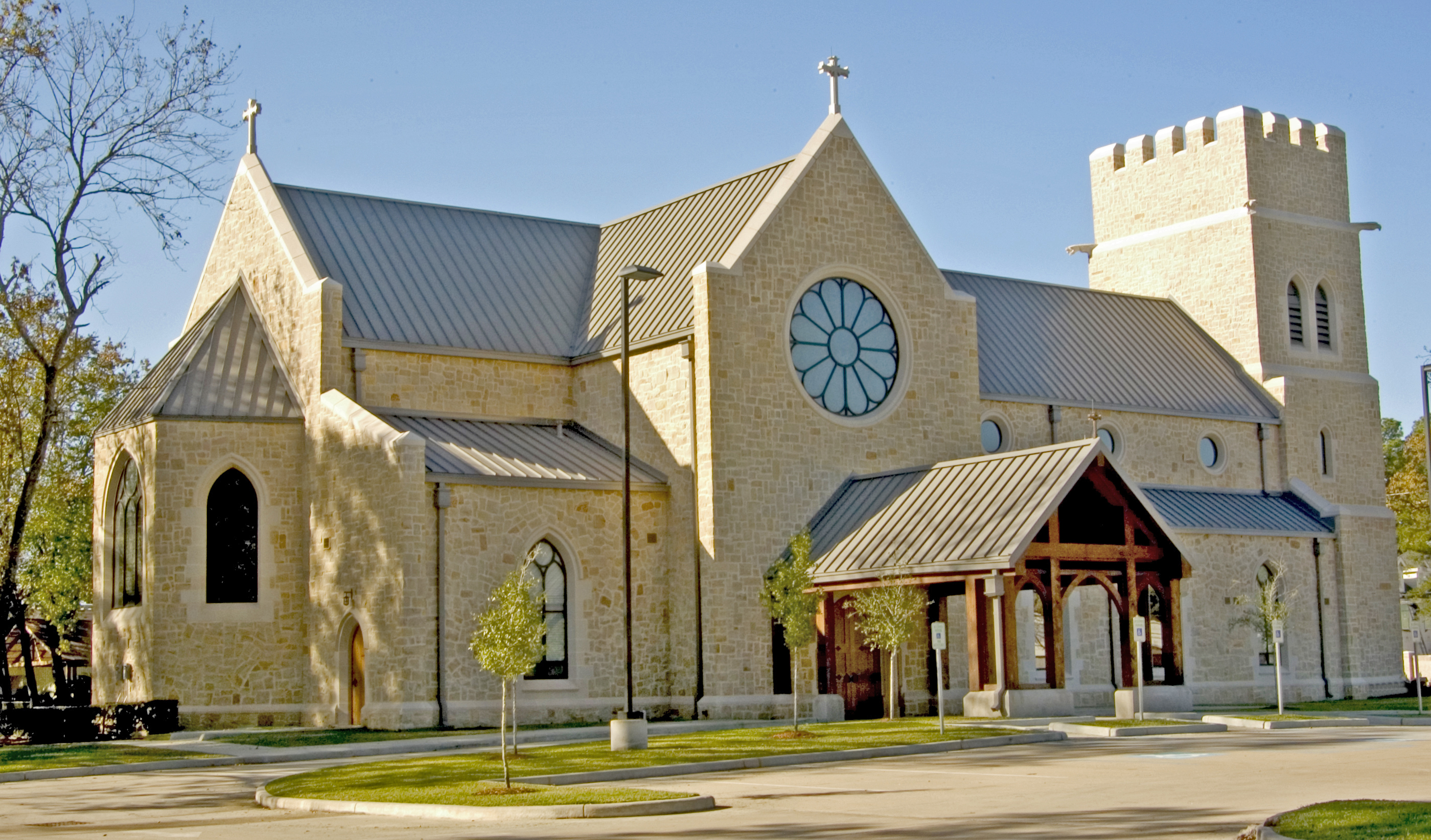
Our Lady of Walsingham

== Awards ==
- 2019 AIA CM Awards – Emmanuel Baptist Church
- Real Estate and Construction Review Plaque of Honor – Our Lady of Walsingham
- 2017 AIACM Merit Award for Design Excellence for St. Kateri, Ridgeway, IL
- 2017 AIACM Merit Award for Design Excellence for St. Andrews, Denver, Colorado
- 2017 AIACM Citation Award for Design Excellence for Our Lady of the Valley Monastery, Prairie Du Sac, WI
- 2015 AIACM Honor Award for Design Excellence for additions to, and renovation of, St Edward's Chapel, Oklahoma City
- 2009 Architect of the Year award from the Macael Institute in Alicante, Spain
- 2003 Golden Trowel Award for outstanding masonry building of the year for Our Lady of Walsingham Church, Houston, Texas
- 1993 Honor Award from the Institute for Religious Art and Architecture for St. Elizabeth's Memorial Garden, Sudbury, Massachusetts
- 1938 and 1949 Boston Society of Architects Harleston Parker Awards for most beautiful building of the year

== History ==
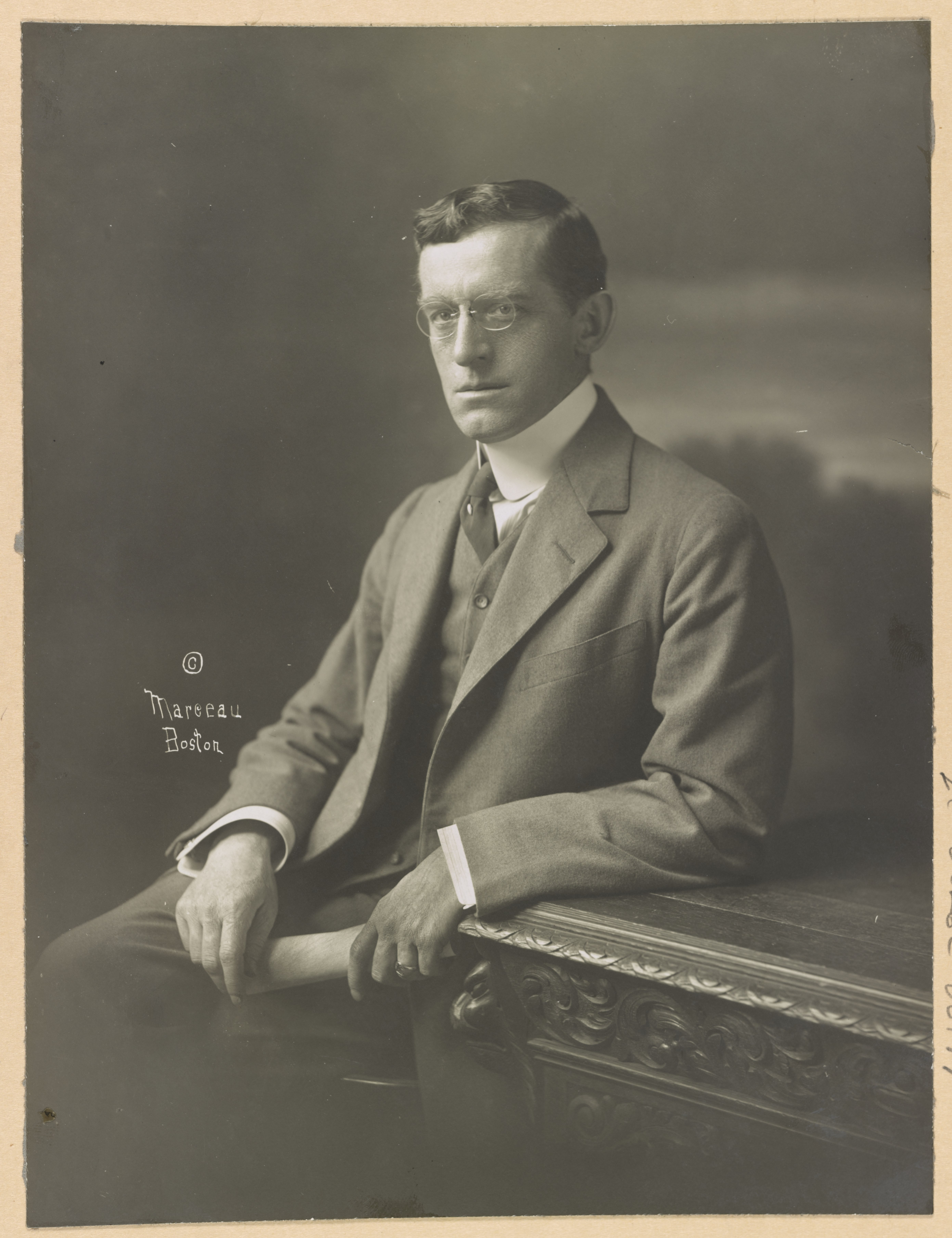
- Ralph Adams Cram, founder of the firm
  The practice of the office was started by Ralph Adams Cram in 1889
- In 1890 Mr. Cram became associated with Charles F. Wentworth and later with Bertram G. Goodhue, who became a partner in 1895. Frank W. Ferguson became a partner in 1899
- Mr. Wentworth died in 1899. Mr. Goodhue conducted the New York Office of the firm for some time before his connection was terminated in 1913
- On July 1, 1925, Frank E. Cleveland, Chester Godfrey and Alexander E. Hoyle were admitted to partnership and a new contract was entered into on October 5, 1926. Now four partners
- Mr. Ferguson died October 4, 1926. (Born November 3, 1861, Portsmouth, N.H.)
- Mr. Cram died September 22, 1942, and the partnership continued with the three remaining partners. (Born December 16, 1863, Hampton Falls, N.H.)
- On January 1, 1944, Chester A. Brown, John T. Doran and William H. Owens were admitted to partnership. The firm now consisted of six equal partners
- Mr. Cleveland died July 30, 1950, and a new partnership was entered into on August 1, 1950, with the five remaining partners. (Born Nov. 11, 1877, Richmond, P.Q., Canada)
- Mr. Godfrey died May 5, 1952, and a new partnership was entered into on July 15, 1952, with the remaining four partners – Messrs. Hoyle, Brown, Doran Owens. (Born April 17, 1878, at Hampton, N.H.)
- Mr. Owens retired April 30, 1953, and a new partnership was entered into on May 1, 1953, with the three remaining partners – Messrs. Hoyle, Brown and Doran
- On May 1, 1954, Maurice A. Berry and Oscar H. Cederlund were admitted to partnership. The firm now consisted of five partners
- Mr. Cederlund died April 23, 1956. Partnership dissolved April 30, 1956. New partnership dated May 1, 1956. Partners now: Messrs. Hoyle, Brown, Doran, Berry
- Mr. Brown retired April 30, 1957. Partnership dissolved April 30, 1957. On May 1, 1957, a new contract was entered into by Messrs. Hoyl, Doran and Berry
- On January 25, 1957, the new was changed to Hoyle, Doran and Berry
- On April 30, 1961, Mr. Hoyle retired. Partnership dissolved April 30, 1961. On May 2, 1961, the following were admitted to partnership: Nisso T. Aladjem, Frank De Bruyn, Robert W. Hadley, Charles P. Harris. There were now six partners
- Mr. Hadley died January 3, 1964. Interim agreement dated January 20, 1964
- Mr. Harris retired January 3, 1966, and a new contract was entered into on January 31, 1966, with the four remaining partners: Messrs. Doran, Berry, Aladjem, De Bruyn
- On August 1, 1965, Austin J. Cribben Jr. was made a partner and a new contract was entered into on February 1, 1966. Partners: Messrs. Doran, Berry, Aladjem, De Bruyn, Cribben
- Hoyle Doran& Berry Inc, was incorporated September 5, 1968; Major Stockholders: Doran, Berry, Aladjem, De Bruyn
- Mr. Hoyle died January 2, 1969
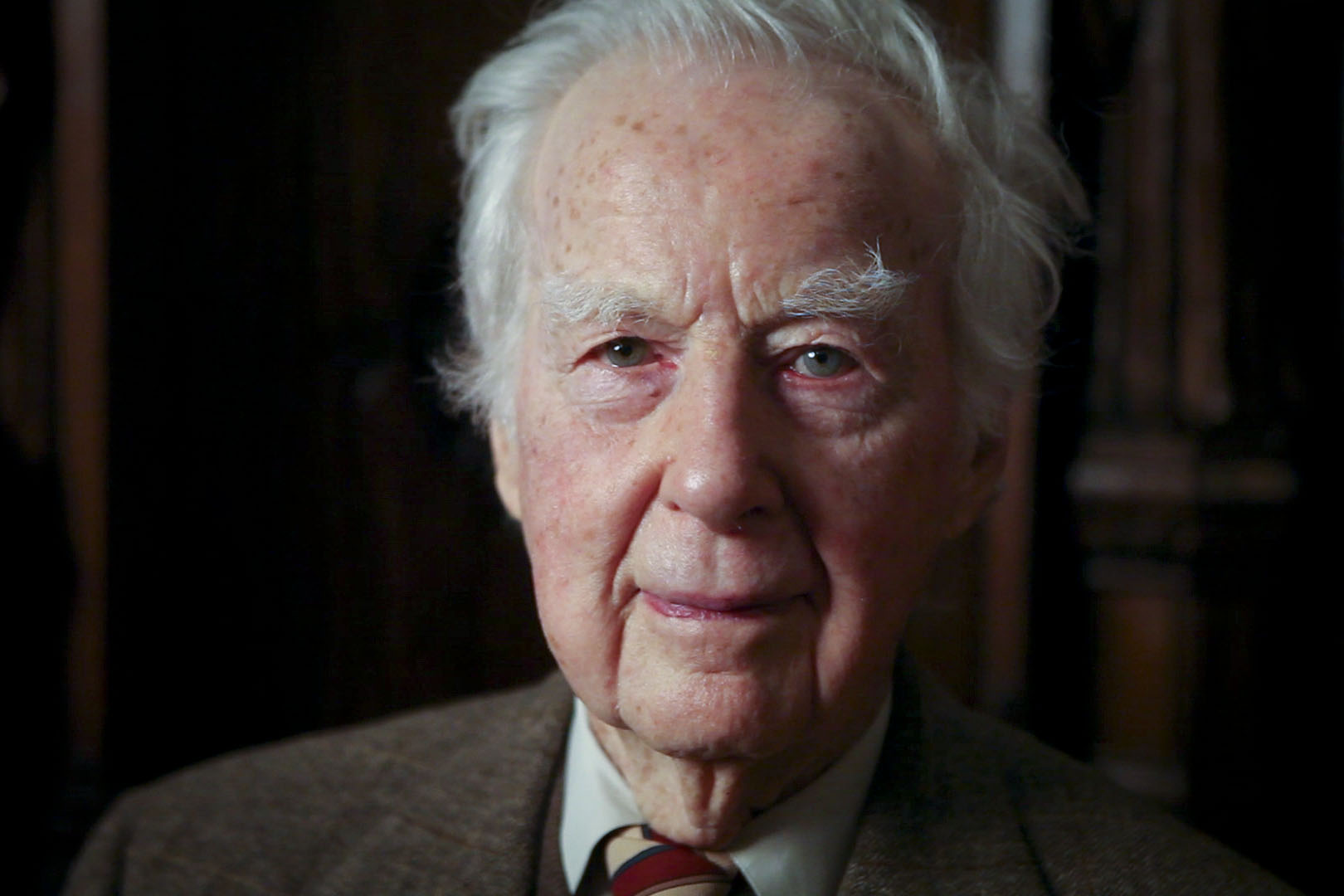
  Austin Cribben
- Mr. De Bruyn died November 15, 1972, after retiring July 31, 1972
- Remaining Partners: Doran, Berry, Aladjem, Cribben
- Mr. Berry retired November 1, 1974
- Mr. Doran died December 14, 1979. Remaining partners: Aladjem, Cribben
- Mr. Brown died June 27, 1980
- Mr. Berry died December 26, 1981. Stockholders as of 1987: Cribben and Aladjem
- December 1990 Ethan Anthony Associates merged with Hoyle Doran & Berry Inc. Ethan Anthony joined David J Hulihan as a majority stockholder
- December 1998 David J. Hulihan Retired, Ethan Anthony became sole Stockholder of Corporation
- 2008 firm renamed HDB/Cram and Ferguson
- March 31, 2010, Hoyle, Doran & Berry Inc dissolved, Assets acquired by Ethan Anthony
- March 31, 2010, Ethan Anthony founds Cram and Ferguson Architects taking up the ongoing work of Hoyle, Doran & Berry Inc.
- September 10, 2012, Cram and Ferguson Architects, LLC Incorporated in the State of Massachusetts
- December 16, 2013, Cram and Ferguson Architects leads the 150th anniversary celebration of the birth of Ralph Adams Cram
- Mr. Cribben and Mr. Aladjem retired 1987
- David Hulihan became a partner 1987
- Ethan Anthony became a partner 1990
- Mr Aladjem died October 23, 2004
- David Hulihan retires 2008
- Mr Cribben died March 30, 2016
- David Hulihan died May 12, 2018
- January 1, 2019, is the 130th anniversary of continuous practice of Cram and Ferguson Architects, LLC.

== Firm names ==
- Ralph Adams Cram founded firm – 1889
- Cram & Wentworth – 1890
- Cram, Wentworth & Goodhue – 1895
- Cram, Goodhue & Ferguson – 1899
- Cram and Ferguson Architects – 1913
- Hoyle, Doran and Berry – 1957
- Hoyle, Doran and Berry, Inc. – 1968
- Cram and Ferguson Architects LLC – 2012

== Commenced employment ==
- C. N. Godfrey – 1900
- A. E. Hoyle – 1908
- C. A. Brown – 1910
- J. T. Doran – 1927
- W. H. Owens – 1921
- M. A. Berry – 1923
- O. H. Cederlund – 1946
- N.T. Aladjem – 1950
- Frank E. De Bruyn – 1926
- R. W. Hadley – 1945
- C. P. Harris – 1955
- A. J. Cribben – 1946
- David J Hulihan – 1967
- Ethan Anthony – 1990

== The team ==
Kevin Hogan, the project manager, has 20 years of experience with the firm and has participated in numerous major church and chapel projects as the leader for all phases of production and construction administration

Matthew Alderman has been the lead designer on many projects both with Cram and Ferguson and in his prior employments, including St. Kateri Catholic Church in Ridgway, Illinois, St. Thomas Aquinas University Parish in Charlottesville, Virginia, which is now under construction and Our Lady of Good Voyage Chapel in Boston, Massachusetts.
