= Ethan Anthony =

American architect, author and academic (born 1950)

Ethan Anthony AIA, Architect
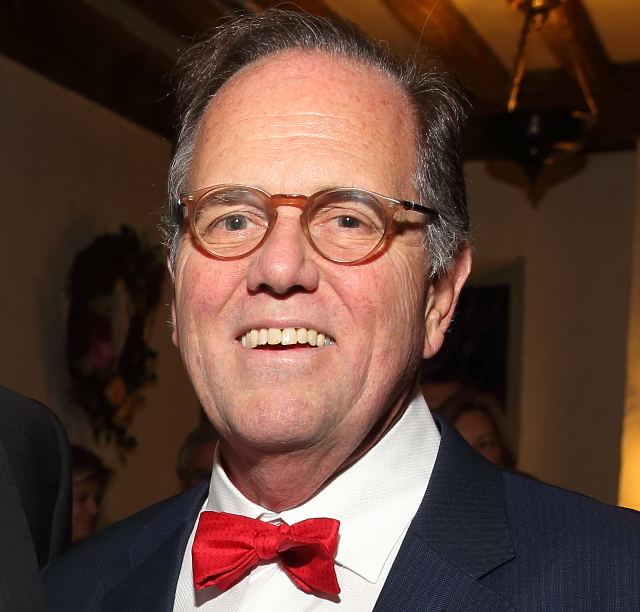
- Born: October 14, 1950 (age 75); Iowa City, Iowa
- Occupation: Architect
- Employer: Owner - Cram and Ferguson Architects

Ethan Anthony (born October 14, 1950) is an American architect, author, and academic. As president of Cram and Ferguson Architects LLC, Anthony focuses on the design of the new Traditional American church architecture. During the last three decades, Anthony has designed numerous new traditional churches and interiors and has gained a national reputation for his work in liturgical architecture. His liturgical work can now be found in fifteen states.

== Early life and education ==
Ethan Anthony was born October 14, 1950, in Iowa City, Iowa. He spent his youth in Stow, Massachusetts, where he attended Stow public schools. He graduated from Xavier High School (Jesuit Brothers) in Concord, Massachusetts, in 1968 and attended the Boston Architectural College, School of Architecture from 1970 to 1977. While there he studied under Peter Blake, Arcangelo Cascieri, and Carl Koch before transferring to the University of Oregon at Eugene. There, Anthony completed his Bachelor of Architecture degree in 1980, studying painting under Frank Okada and Brian Kaslov and architecture in the studio of Professor Gary Moye.

== Career ==
Following graduation, Anthony returned to Boston where he was employed for three years in the firm of Thomas Payette. While at Payette Associates, Mr. Anthony served as project architect under John L. Wilson, Vice President of Design. Projects included medical office buildings and hospital planning and design projects around the United States and a project for a hotel in Egypt.

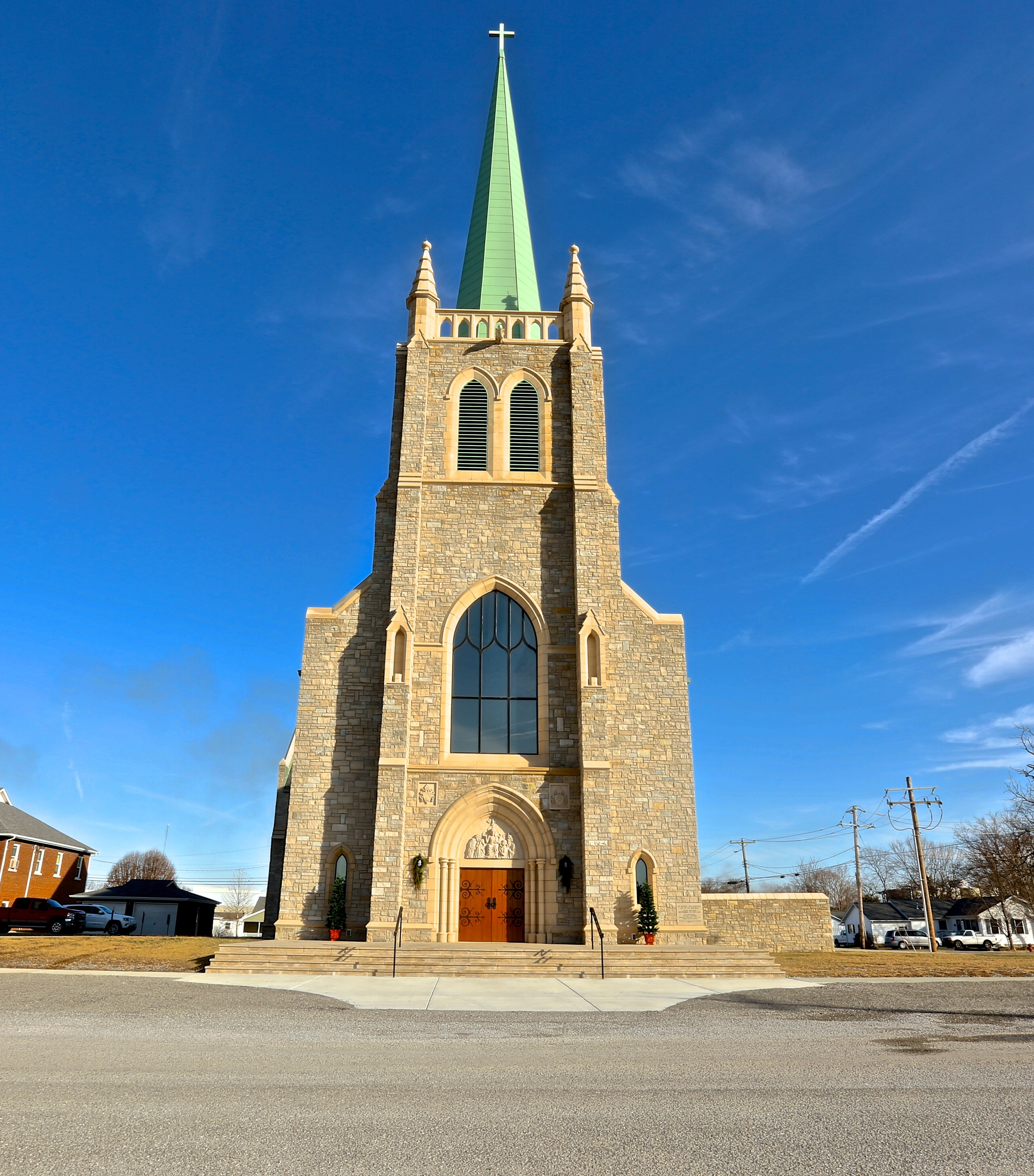
St. Kateri Tekakwitha Parish built by Cram and Ferguson Architects

A graduate of the School of Art and Architecture at the University of Oregon, Anthony served as a Project Architect under John L. Wilson. On leaving Payette Associates in 1983 Anthony founded Anthony Associates with an office on Congress Street where he practiced until 1990. During those seven years he designed a major renovation of and significant additions to the Springfield, Vermont Hospital and numerous residential and educational projects in New England.

He then merged his firm with Cram and Ferguson in 1990 as a partner. From 1991 to 1996 Anthony and his partner David Hulihan completed many projects for MCI Telecommunications Corporation throughout the Eastern half of the United States. Other clients included New England Telephone, Allmerica Insurance and National Life Insurance Company among others. In 1997 David Hulihan retired and the firm name was changed to HDB/Cram and Ferguson to reflect a return to the origins and traditions of the practice.

Beginning in 1997, Anthony has led the practice as President and Principal of Cram & Ferguson Architects, LLC, Under his leadership the firm has continued its 125 year focus on planning and design of new traditionally-inspired religious and academic buildings and campus planning in addition to Preservation of significant historic buildings. Anthony is the President of the American Institute of Architects, Central Massachusetts Chapter and the INTBAU College of Traditional Practitioners based in London, has won numerous awards for design excellence, and in addition to authoring articles in Traditional Building and Faith and Form magazines, published "The Architecture of Ralph Adams Cram and his Firm" (WW Norton, New York, 2007).

== Religious architecture ==
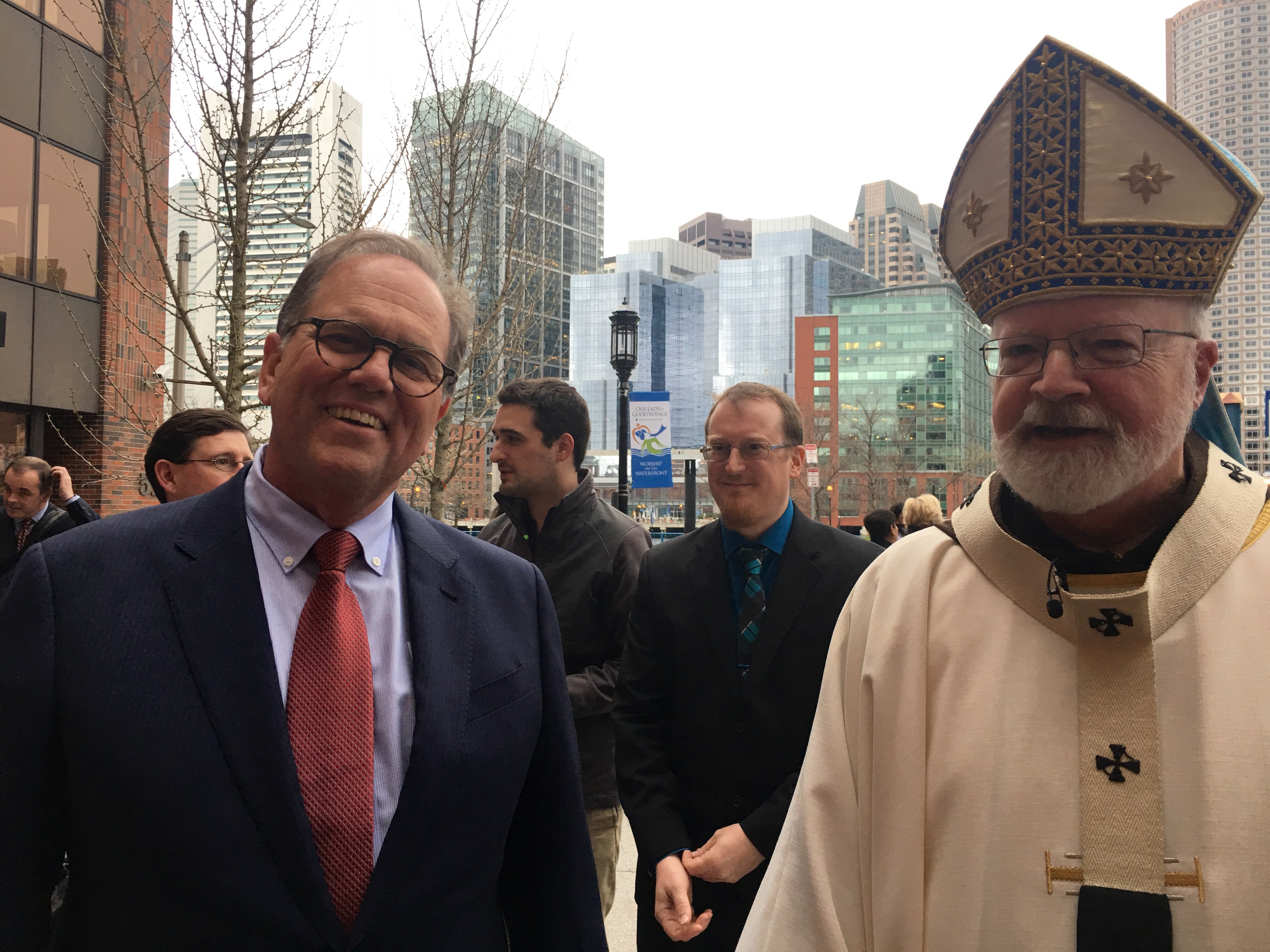
Ethan Anthony and Cardinal Seán Patrick O'Malley at the dedication of Our Lady of Good Voyage

Anthony brought his early Jesuit introduction to religion to Cram and Ferguson soon augmented by research journeys to great European monuments. His background in medieval history and readings in symbolism and architecture have informed his notable works include the 2019 Church for the St. Thomas Aquinas University Parish at the University of Virginia, 2017 Shrine of Our Lady of Good Voyage, Boston, and 2016 Church for the St. Kateri Tekakwitha Parish, Ridgway, Illinois, among many others. In depth research in the predecessor's firm work led to his recent book "The Architecture of Ralph Adams Cram and His Office", published in 2007. Anthony has designed numerous new traditional churches and interiors and has gained a national reputation for his work in liturgical architecture. His liturgical work can now be found in fifteen states. Since 1990, Mr. Anthony has concentrated on planning, design and restoration of historically significant buildings, design of new churches and additions to historic buildings.

From 1991 to 1996 Anthony and his partner David Hulihan completed many projects for MCI Telecommunications Corporation throughout the Eastern United States. Other projects were completed for New England Telephone, Allmerica Insurance, National Life Insurance Company among others.

In 1997 David Hulihan left the practice and Anthony continued the firm changing the name to HDB/ Cram and Ferguson to reflect the origins and traditions that he was reasserting in the practice. Church and academic work began to be more important in the workload and by 2000 90% of the workload was church or academic related.

As part of this work Anthony has traveled extensively over the last twenty years in England, France, Germany, Italy and Spain collecting photographs and detail information from source Gothic and Romanesque churches and monasteries as inspiration for work he is designing, as well as resulting in his blog Ruins and Rosemary.

Also since 1990 Anthony has also worked to organize the firm archives composed of some 10,000 photographs and 100,000 drawings. He published The Architecture of Ralph Adams Cram and His Office, (WW Norton, 2007)

=== Recent works ===
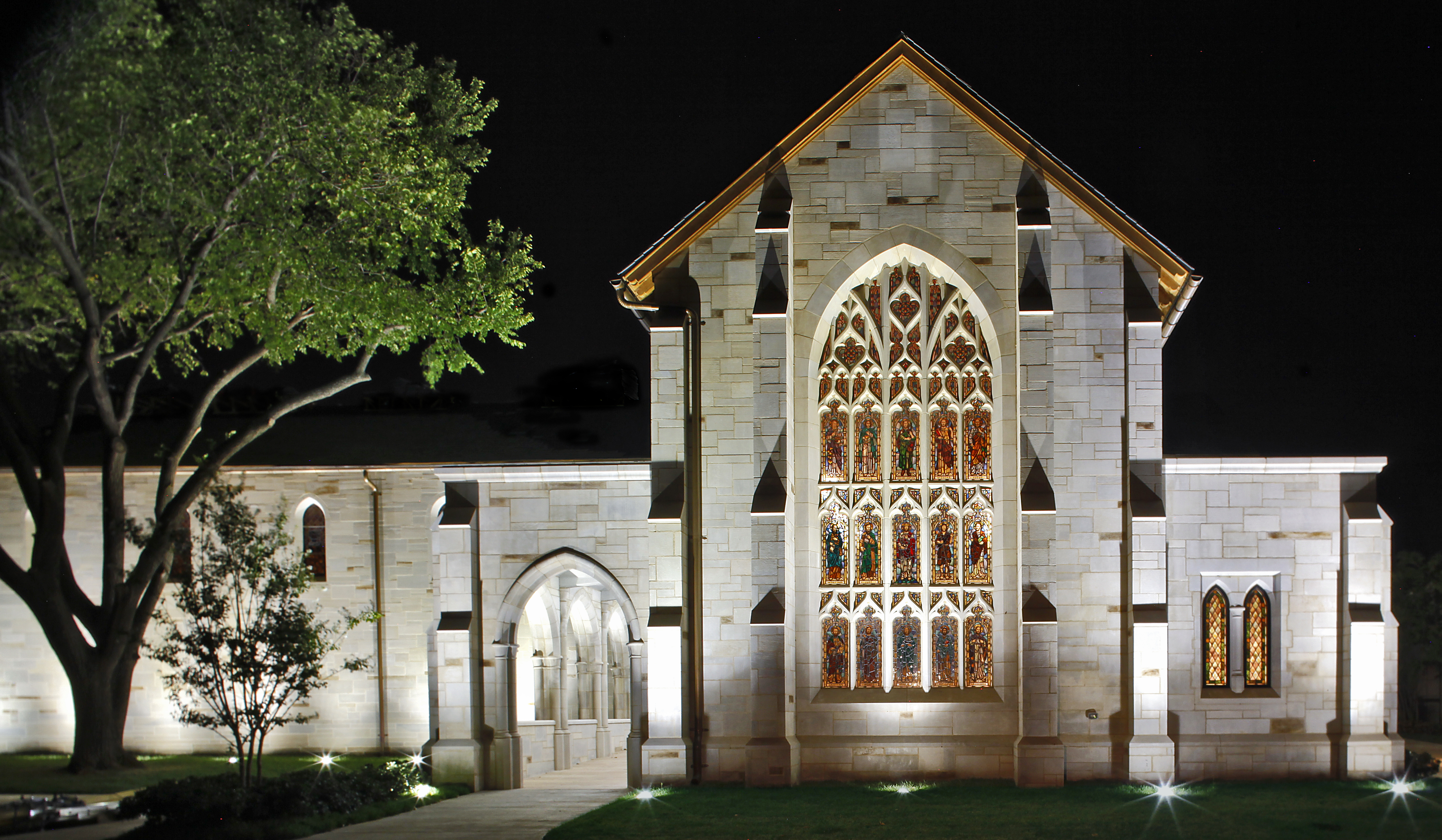
- St. Edward's Chapel, The Casady School, Olklahoma city, OK
  St. Timothy's Episcopal Church: Winston-Salem, NC 2017 to present
  - Additions and Renovations
- Sisters of St Thomas Aquinas: Brooksville, FL 2016 to present
  - New Church and Convent
- Cathedral of the Holy Cross: Boston, MA, 2014 to 2016
  - Belfry Renovation
- Our Lady of Good Voyage: Boston, MA, 2014 to present
  - Interior design for a new 200-seat Gothic chapel
- Messiah Lutheran Church: South Windsor, CT, 2014 to present
  - Extension of church
- St. Kateri Tekakwitha Parish: Ridgway, IL 2013 to present
  - New 450-seat Catholic church
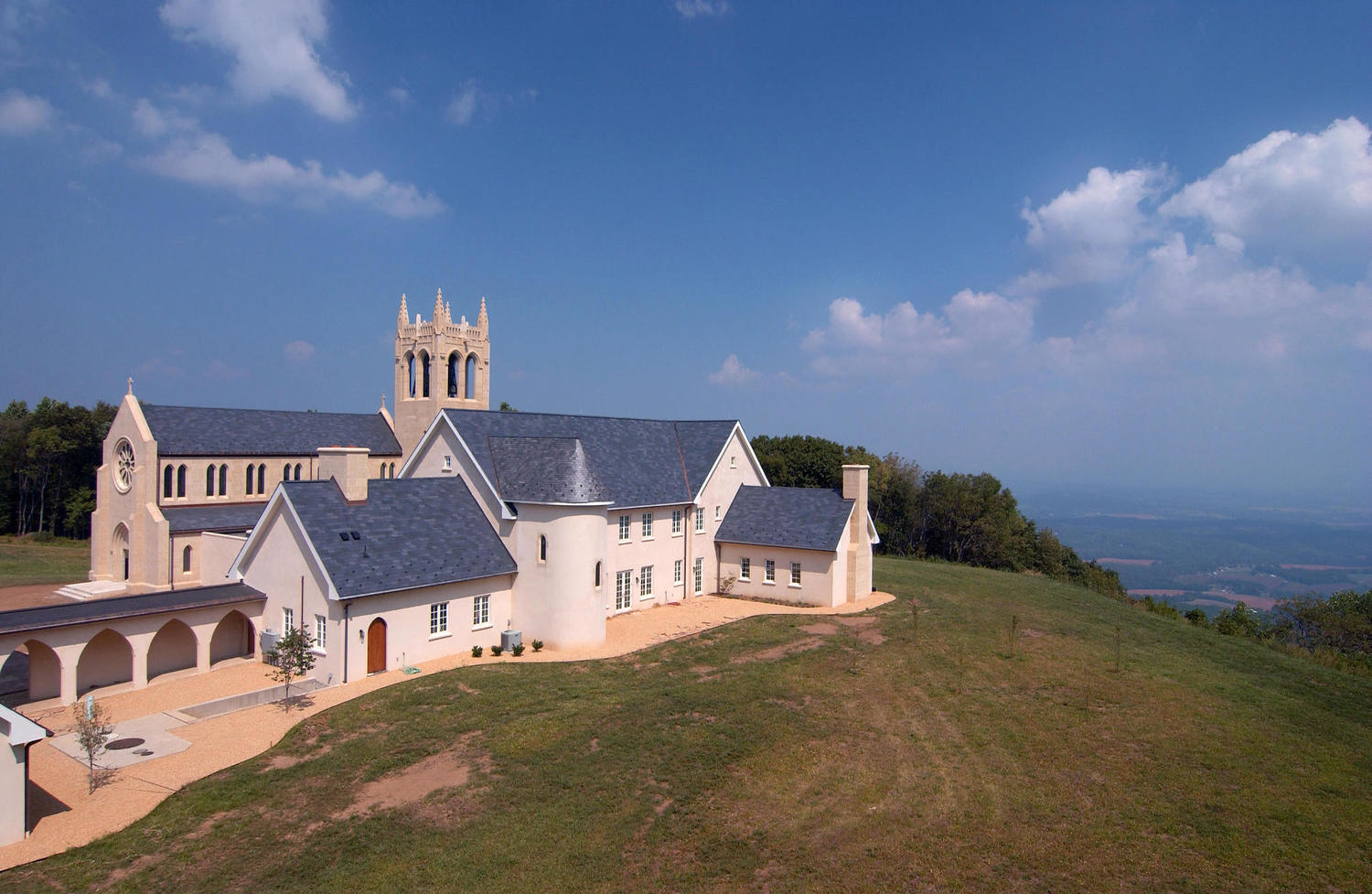
    Syon Abbey Monastery - Blue Ridge, VA, 2007
- Valley of Our Lady Cistercian Monastery: Hollandale, WI, 2011 to Present
  - New Monastery
- Chapel of St. Gabriel the Archangel: Norwood, MA, 2011 to present.
  - Chapel Renovation
- St. John Neumann Catholic Church: Farragut, TN, 2005 to 2008
  - New Church
- St. Edward's Chapel, Casady School: Oklahoma City, OK, 2002-2011
  - Church Addition
- St. Andrew's Church: Denver Colorado, 2002-2009
  - Master Plan, Addition and Restoration
- Syon Abbey: Copper Hill, Virginia, 2002-2008
  - New Church and Monastery
- George J. Records Family Mausoleum, Oklahoma City, OK, 2002-2005
  - New Mausoleum
- Our Lady of Walsingham Roman Catholic Church: Houston, Texas, 2000-2003
  - New Church
- Phillips Chapel, Canterbury School: Greensboro, North Carolina, 1999-2003
  - New Church

=== Historic preservation ===
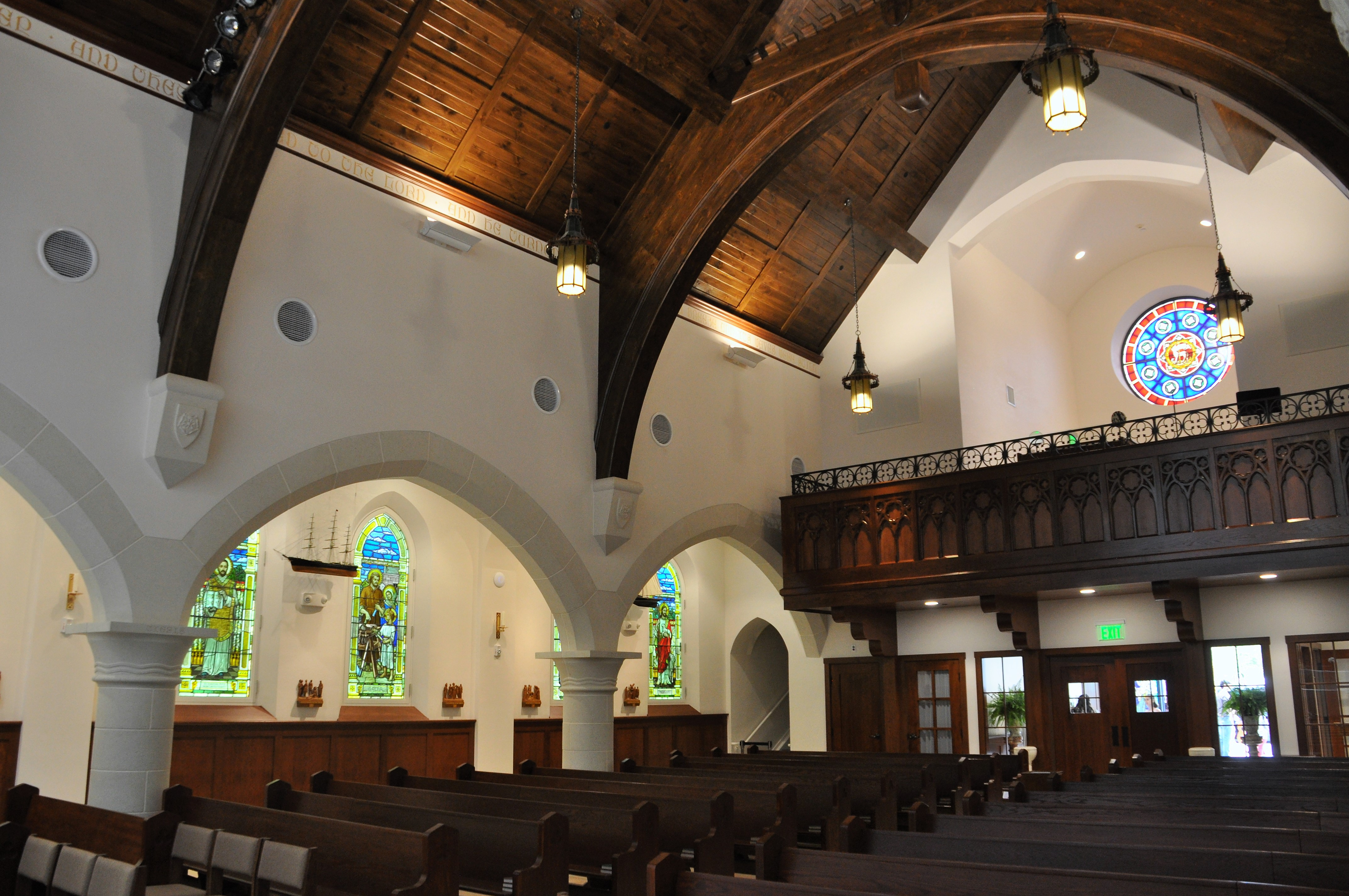
Our Lady of Good Voyage Interior

- St. Paul's Episcopal Church: Malden, MA, 2000 to present
  - Restoration of front elevation, slate and copper roofs; existing conditions survey and accessibility design
- Chapel of St. Gabriel the Archangel: Norwood, MA, 2011 to present.
  - Chapel Renovation
- Winchester Unitarian Society: Winchester, MA, 2006-2007
  - Masterplan
- St. Edward's Chapel, Casady School: Oklahoma City, OK 2002-2010
  - Church Addition
- St. Andrew's Church: Denver, CO 2002-2009
  - Master Plan, Church Addition and Restoration
- Hunt Memorial Restoration: Nashua, NH 2002-2011
  - Window, masonry, roof restoration, design and coordination for HVAC installation, full renovation
- All Saints Episcopal Church: Peterborough, NH 1997-2001
  - Cloister addition to historic church
- Saint George's Chapel, Saint George's School: Middletown, RI 2000
  - Existing Conditions Survey
- Phillips Church, Phillips Exeter Academy: Exeter, NH 1997-2002
  - Preservation planning, Programming, Alterations & Renovations
- First Presbyterian Church Russell Sage Memorial: Far Rockaway, NY, 1995–98
- All Saints Episcopal Church: Worcester, MA, 1995
  - Preservation Plan

== Awards ==
- 2019 - AIA Central MA Design Awards; Emmanuel Baptist Church
- 2017 - AIA Central MA Design Awards; Valley of Our Lady Monastery, WI; St Kateri Tekakwitha, IL; St Andrew's, CO
- 2015 – AIA Central MA Design Awards; St Edward's Chapel Casady School, Oklahoma City OK
- 2007 - Macael Award to the Architect; Spain
- 2004 - Golden Trowel Award; Houston, Texas Masonry Institute for Our Lady of Walsingham
- 1993 - IFRAA Honor Award for Unbuilt Architecture "Cathedral in the Woods"
  - One of 13 projects selected from 120 International entries.
