= Richmond Court =

- U.S. National Register of Historic Places
- U.S. Historic district
- U.S. Historic district – Contributing property
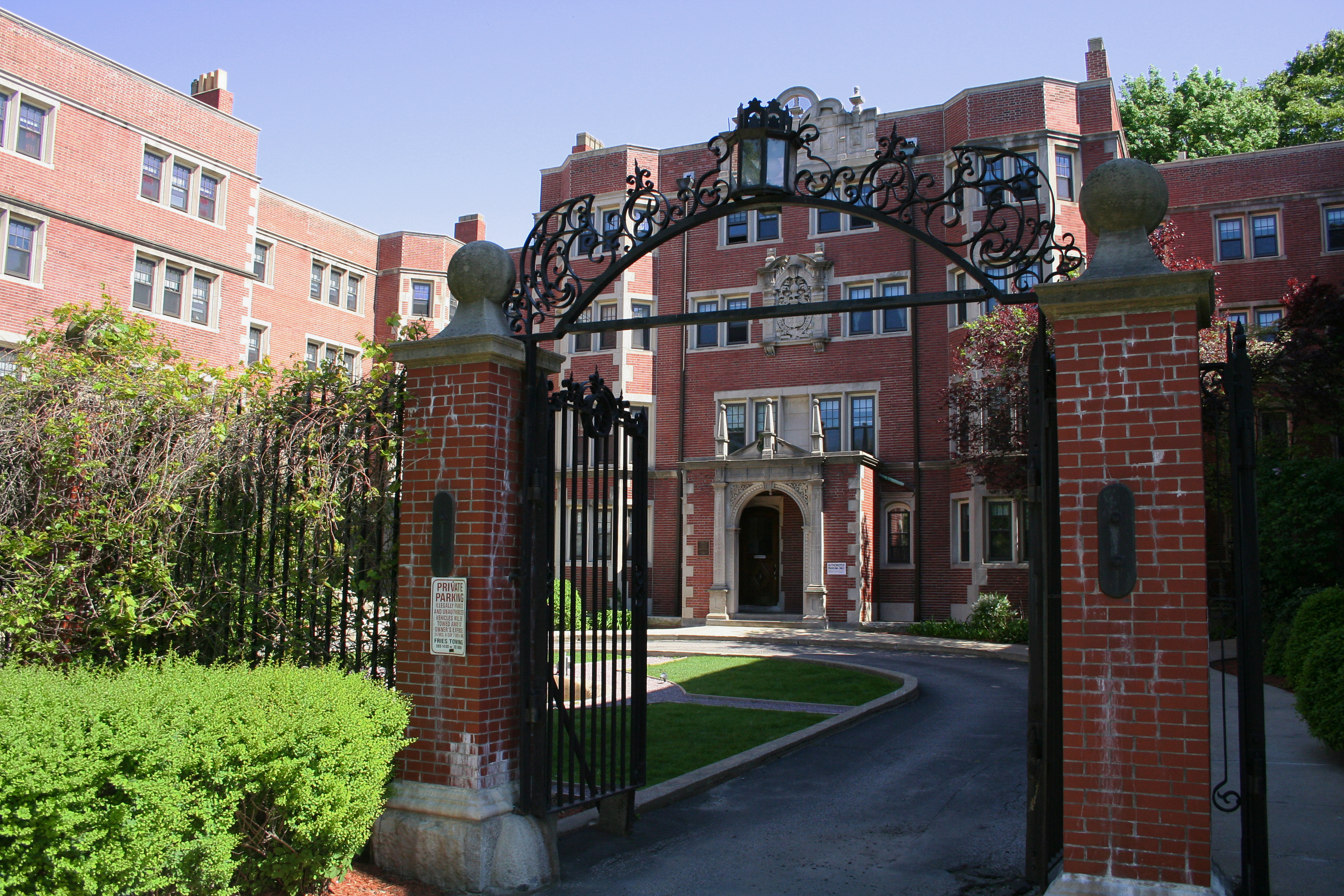

- Location within Massachusetts Location within the United States
- Location: Brookline, Massachusetts
- Coordinates: 42°20′35″N 71°6′59″W
- Built: 1896
- Architect: Ralph Adams Cram
- Architectural style: Colonial, Jacobethan
- Part of: Beacon Street Historic District (ID85003322)
- NRHP reference No.: 85001575

Significant dates
- Added to NRHP: July 18, 1985
- Designated CP: October 17, 1985

Richmond Court is a historic apartment complex at 1209–1217 Beacon Street in Brookline, Massachusetts. Designed by Ralph Adams Cram and built in 1898, this was probably the first apartment house built in the northeastern United States that resembled an English Tudor manor house. This attractive design made the building a fashionable alternative to more utilitarian apartment complex designs.

The complex was listed on the National Register of Historic Places in 1985, and included later that year in the Beacon Street Historic District.

== See also ==
- National Register of Historic Places listings in Brookline, Massachusetts
