= St. Andrew's Episcopal Church (Denver) =

Historic church in Colorado, United States

- U.S. National Register of Historic Places
- Colorado State Register of Historic Properties
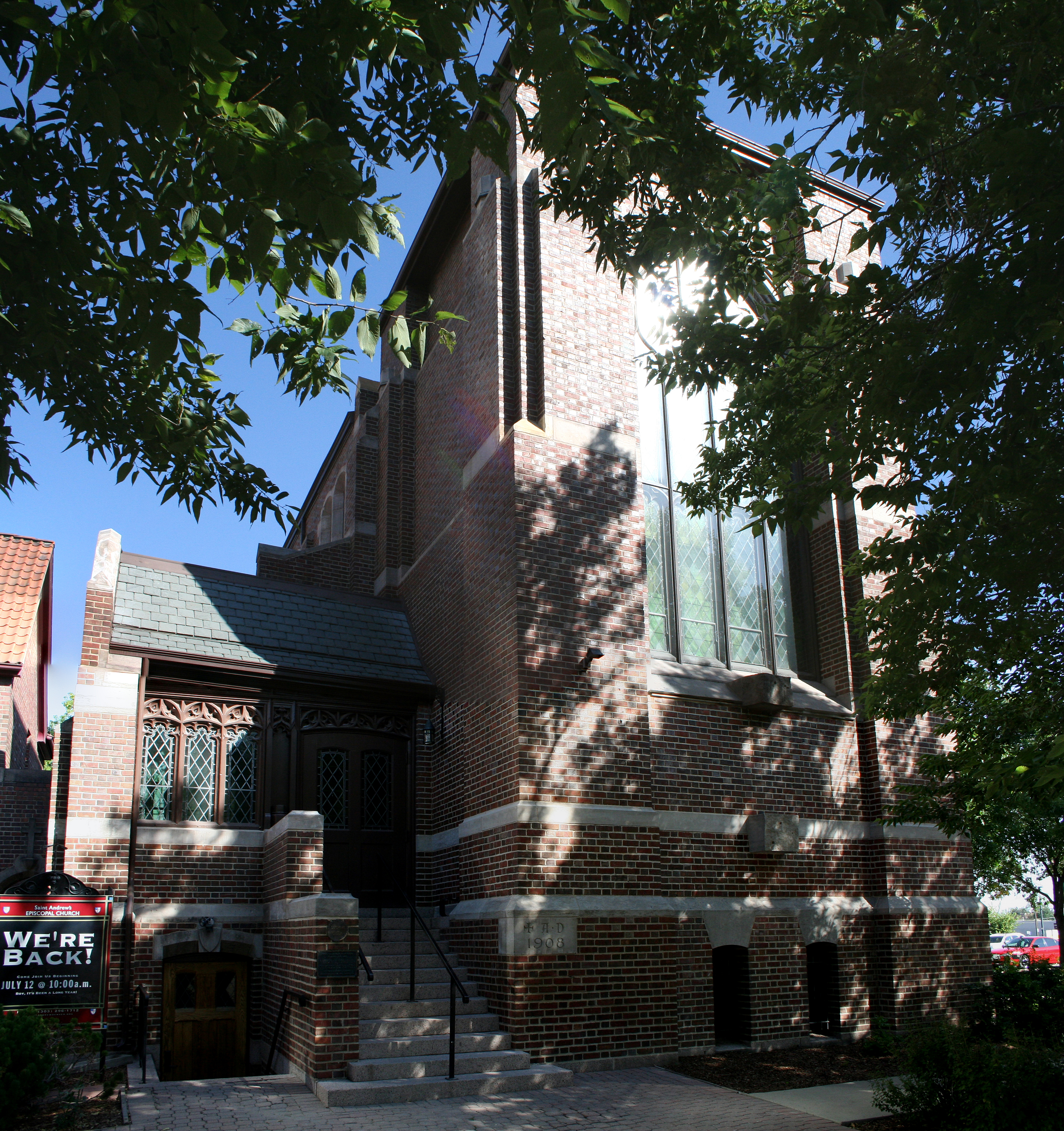

- Location within Colorado Location within the United States
- Location: 2015 Glenarm Place; Denver, Colorado
- Coordinates: 39°44′53″N 104°59′5″W
- Area: 0.5 acres (0.20 ha)
- Built: c.1907-1909
- Architect: Ralph Adams Cram
- Architectural style: Gothic
- NRHP reference No.: 75000512
- CSRHP No.: 5DV.116
- Added to NRHP: March 18, 1975

St. Andrew's Episcopal Church is an Anglo-catholic church in Denver, Colorado, United States. It is a Gothic style church built c.1907-1909, designed by architect Ralph Adams Cram. It was dedicated January 17, 1909 as Trinity Memorial Church and was renamed to St. Andrew's in 1917. The church reported 335 members in 2016 and 295 members in 2023; no membership statistics were reported in 2024 parochial reports. Plate and pledge income reported for the congregation in 2024 was $444,826 with average Sunday attendance (ASA) of 74 persons. This was a relative decrease from ASA of 220 reported in 2016.

The church had its beginning as Trinity Memorial Chapel, initially organized as a mission school by the St. John's Church Sunday School, and located near 26th and Curtis streets in Denver. The cornerstone for the chapel was laid on March 18, 1874 by Bishop John Franklin Spalding, making that structure the second Episcopal church building in Denver. The bishop named the Rev. Walter H. Moore as its first rector. Father Moore had graduated from General Theological Seminary a few years earlier. The Rev. Charles H. Marshall served as rector from 1880 to 1895. Father Marshall enlarged the building to a capacity of 350. His successors, the Rev. D.L.V. Moffett and the Rev. C. Y. Grimes, paid off the remaining debt, and established an excellent choir.

The distinguished architect Cram, of Cram and Ferguson in Boston, Massachusetts, was commissioned to design the building for Alexis Dupont Parker as a memorial to his wife. Parker was a magnate of the Colorado and Southern Railway who was educated in the Episcopal ministry, and was president of the board of the Colorado diocese of the Episcopal Church.

The building was listed on the National Register of Historic Places in 1975.

Expanded in 2008 to a design in keeping with Cram's original plans for a larger church, St. Andrew's now seats 175. It includes works by Denver artists Marion Buchan and Albert Byron Olson. The parish house is by Denver architect Jacques Benedict.
