= Church of the Covenant (Cleveland) =

Historic church in Ohio, United States

- The Church of the Covenant
- U.S. National Register of Historic Places
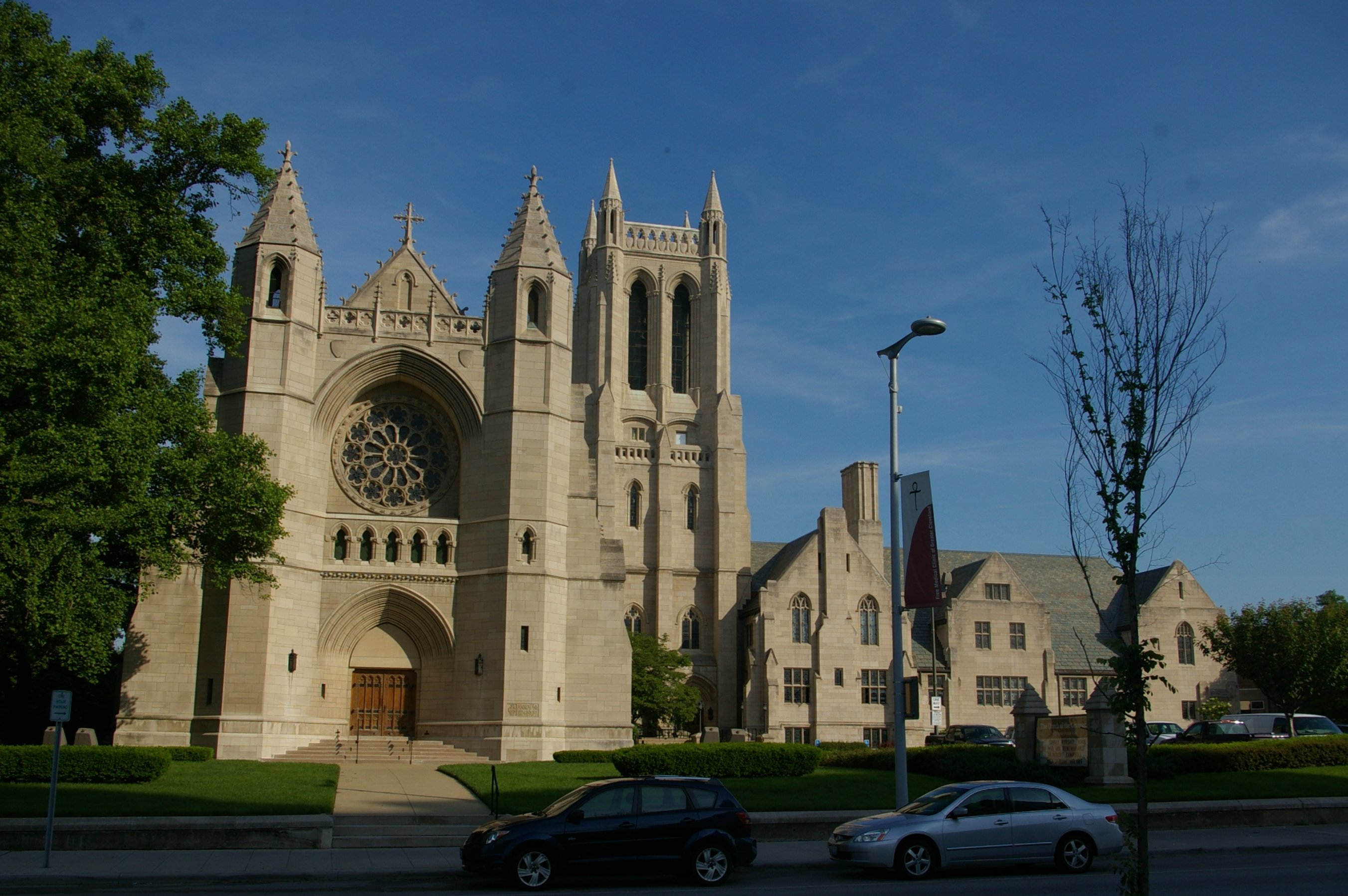
- The Church of the Covenant (PCUSA)

- Location within Cleveland Location within Ohio Location within the United States
- Location: 11205 Euclid Ave., Cleveland, Ohio
- Coordinates: 41°30′30″N 81°36′27″W
- Area: 2 acres (0.81 ha)
- Built: 1911
- Architects: Cram, Goodhue & Ferguson
- Architectural style: Late Gothic Revival
- NRHP reference No.: 80002977
- Added to NRHP: March 12, 1980

The Church of the Covenant (Euclid Avenue Presbyterian Church) or the Presbyterian Church of the Covenant is a historic church on Euclid Avenue in Cleveland, Ohio's University Circle. It is a Presbyterian congregation and a part of the Presbytery of the Western Reserve.

It was built in 1911 to designs created by architects Cram and Ferguson. In 1968, the McGaffin Carillon was created by the Royal Eijsbouts bell foundry and added to the church's tower. In 1972, the church added an addition, designed by Richard Fleishman in a contemporary-brutalist style, to serve as a community education center. Church of the Covenant was added to the National Register of Historic Places in 1980.

The Presbyterian Church founded Western Reserve College (a founding institution of Case Western Reserve University) in order to educate seminarians preparing for Christian ministry. The Church of the Covenant maintains an intimate relationship with Case Western Reserve University, which maintains a chaplaincy for the student body. The United Protestant Campus Ministries (UPCaM) for Case Western Reserve University students and medical trainees is hosted at Church of the Covenant. Though the Church of the Covenant is Presbyterian Christian, it welcomes Case students of all faith backgrounds.
