= Watkins Manor House =

Historic house in Minnesota, United States

- Paul Watkins House
- U.S. National Register of Historic Places
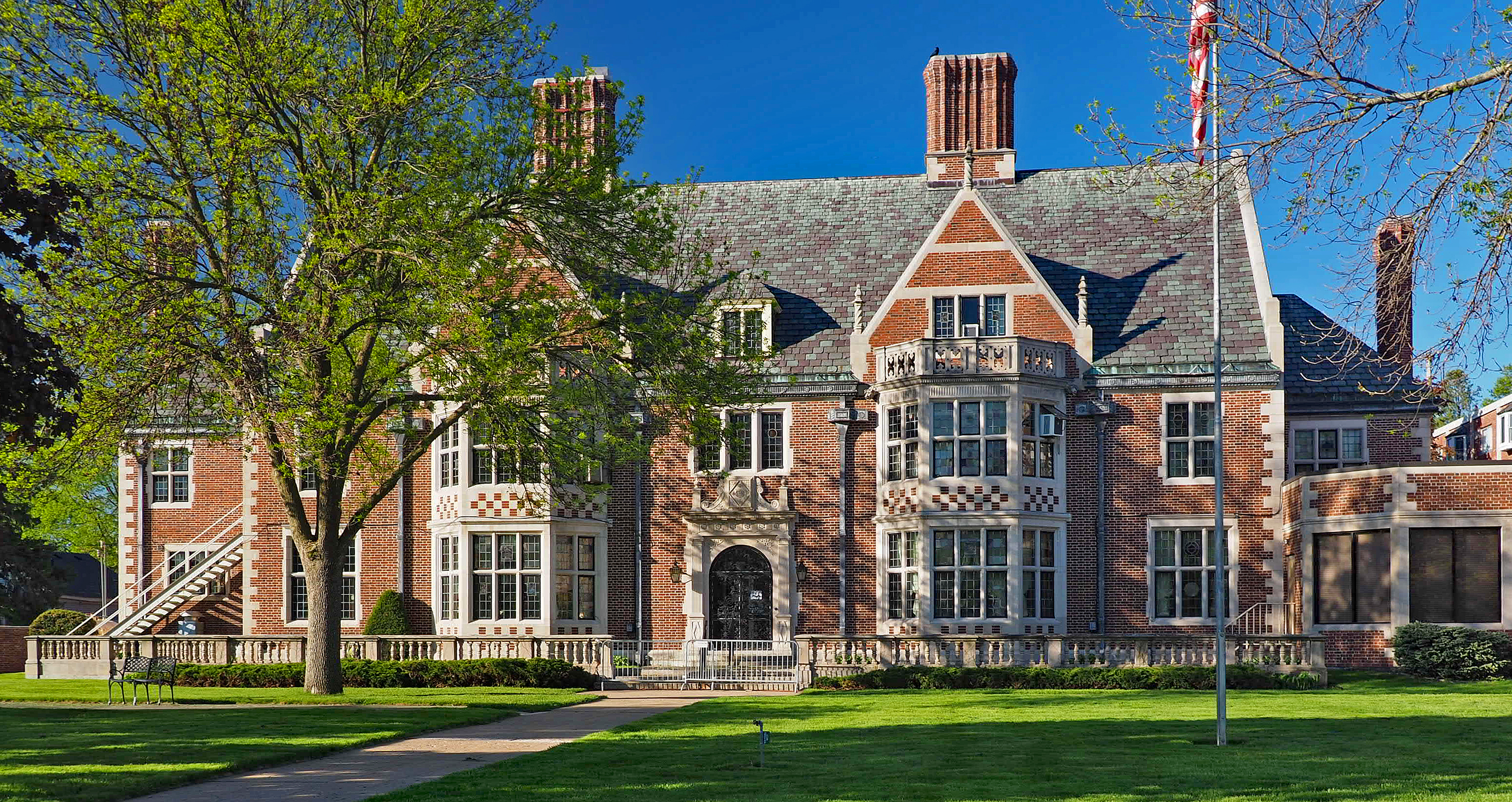
- The Paul Watkins House viewed from the north

- Location within Minnesota Location within the United States
- Location: 175 East Wabasha Street, Winona, Minnesota
- Coordinates: 44°2′49.3″N 91°38′7.6″W
- Area: 4 acres (1.6 ha)
- Built: 1924–27
- Architect: Cram & Ferguson
- Architectural style: Jacobethan
- NRHP reference No.: 84000255
- Designated: November 8, 1984

The Watkins Manor House is a historic mansion in Winona, Minnesota, United States. It was built from 1924 to 1927 for Paul Watkins (1865–1931), second-generation leader of the J.R. Watkins Company and progenitor of its famous door-to-door sales strategy. It was designed in the Jacobethan style by architect Ralph Adams Cram. The house was listed on the National Register of Historic Places in 1984 as the Paul Watkins House for its local significance in the themes of architecture and commerce. It was nominated for its associations with Paul Watkins and the Watkins Company, and for its architecture, being a rare and unaltered example of a house designed by an architect better known for his churches and institutional buildings.

The manor is now part of a senior housing complex, containing apartments and community spaces.

== See also ==
- National Register of Historic Places listings in Winona County, Minnesota
