= Emmanuel Baptist (Worcester, Massachusetts) =

Historic church in Massachusetts, United States

- U.S. National Register of Historic Places
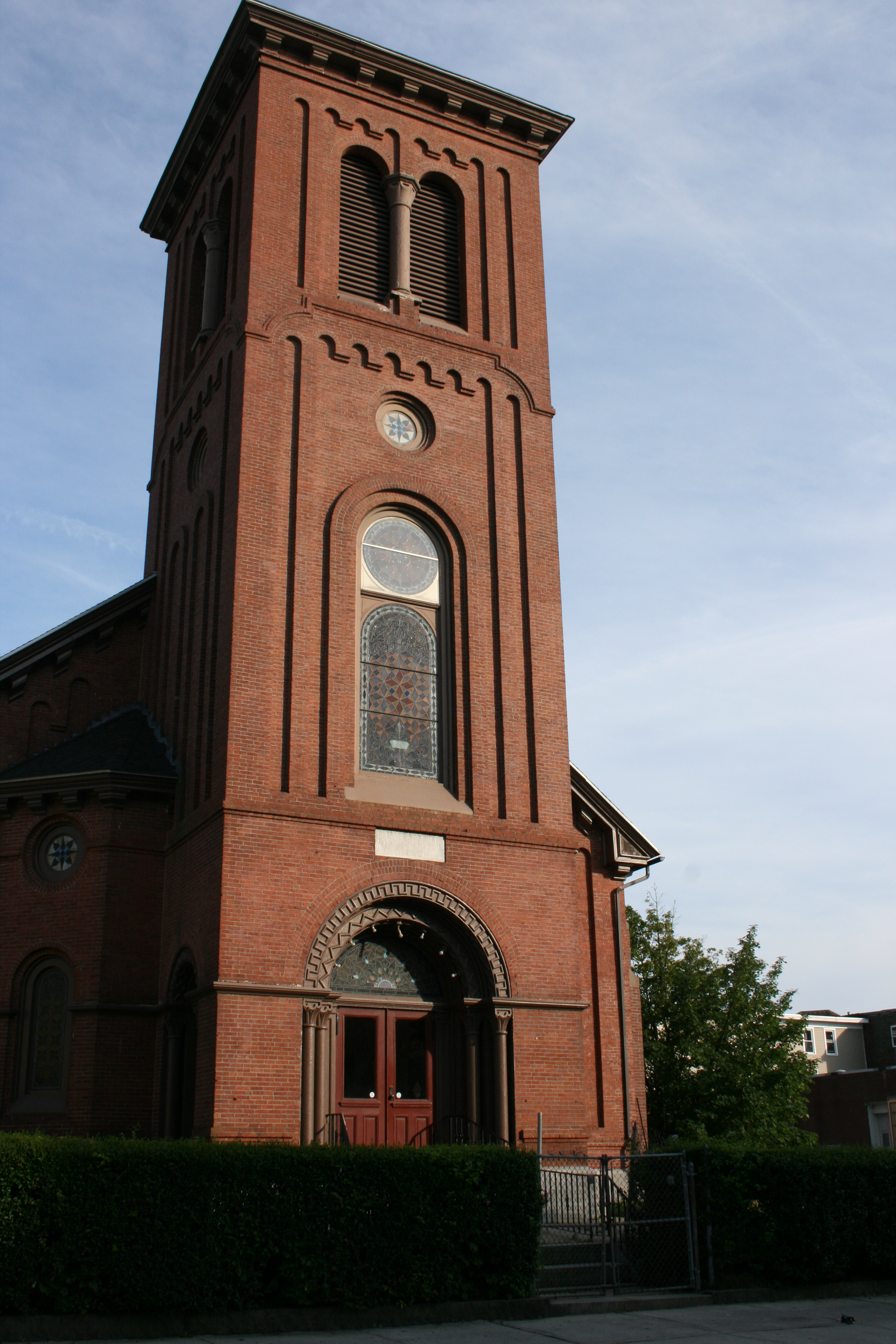

- Location within Massachusetts Location within the United States
- Location: 717 Main St., Worcester, Massachusetts
- Coordinates: 42°15′27″N 71°48′29″W
- Built: 1853
- MPS: Worcester MRA
- NRHP reference No.: 80000536
- Added to NRHP: March 5, 1980

Emmanuel Baptist or the Main Street Baptist Church is a historic Baptist church building at 717 Main Street in Worcester, Massachusetts. It is the only example of Norman Style architecture in the city. The brick church was built in two parts: the chapel was built in 1853, and the main church body was built in 1855. The elements characteristic of this particular style include recessed wall paneling, the corbelled roofline, buttresses, and the recessed entry framed by an arch. The church was built for the Third Baptist congregation, which merged with the First Baptists in 1902, at which time the building was sold to the First Presbyterian Church of Worcester.

The building was listed on the National Register of Historic Places in 1980.

== See also ==
- National Register of Historic Places listings in southwestern Worcester, Massachusetts
- National Register of Historic Places listings in Worcester County, Massachusetts
