= All Saints Church (Peterborough, New Hampshire) =

Historic church in New Hampshire, United States

- U.S. National Register of Historic Places
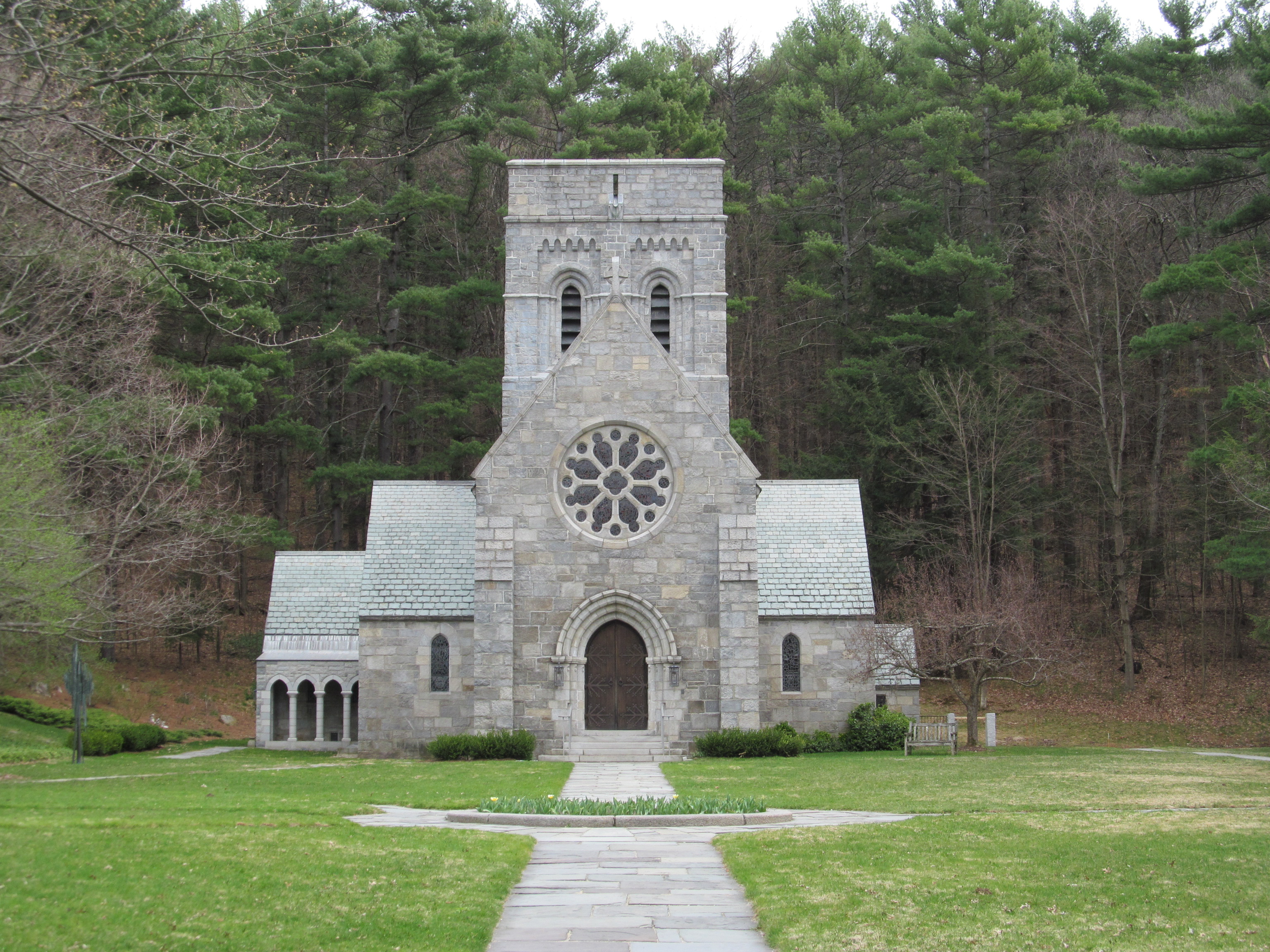
- All Saints Church
- Location: 51 Concord Street; Peterborough, New Hampshire
- Coordinates: 42°52′50″N 71°56′45″W
- Area: 1.6 acres (0.65 ha)
- Built: ca. 1916-1920
- Architect: Ralph Adams Cram
- Architectural style: Colonial Revival, Gothic Revival
- NRHP reference No.: 80000290
- Added to NRHP: December 1, 1980

All Saints Church is an historic Episcopal church located at 51 Concord Street in Peterborough, New Hampshire, in the United States. Completed in 1914, it is a completely realized example of an English country church as interpreted by the architect Ralph Adams Cram. On December 1, 1980, it was added to the National Register of Historic Places.

It is a parish in the Monadnock Deanery of the Episcopal Diocese of New Hampshire. The Rev. Dr. Jennifer L. Walters is the current Rector.

The church reported 378 members in 2018 and 307 members in 2023; no membership statistics were reported in 2024 parochial reports. Plate and pledge income reported for the congregation in 2024 was $413,491 with average Sunday attendance (ASA) of 121 persons.

== Description ==
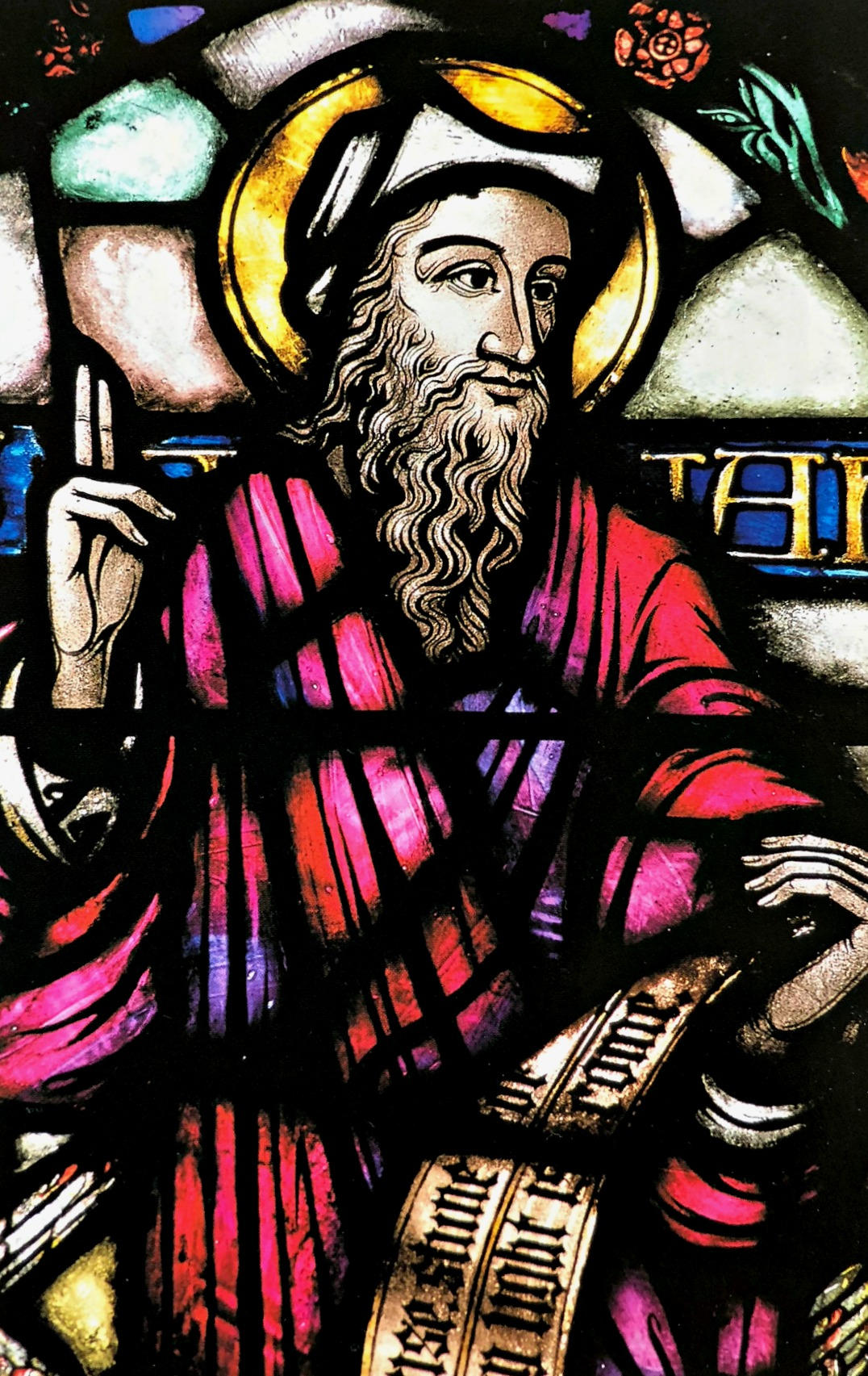
Stained glass Isaiah window in the church

All Saints Church is located north of Peterborough's commercial downtown, on the east side of Concord Street (United States Route 202). It is a modest single-story structure, built out of locally quarried granite. It is basically cruciform in plan, its symmetry affected only by a small chapel extending from its southern transept. Its exterior is finished in rough ashlar stone. The main facade has a center entry set in a Gothic archway, with buttresses at the building corners. Set in the gable above the entrance is a round wagon-wheel stained glass window. A square tower rises above the crossing point of the nave and transepts, with peaked louvered belfry openings on either side of the nave's steeply pitched gable roof.

== History ==
All Saints Church was organized as a mission in 1904 and became a parish in 1914. In 1912, architect Ralph Adams Cram began design work for a church building in the Colonial Revival and Gothic Revival styles. One of his models was St. Mary the Virgin Church in Iffley, Oxfordshire, England. Since Cram's commission was from an individual donor, Mary Lyon Cheney Schofield, rather than from a church body, he was not required to make the artistic compromises that might otherwise have been required. The church has been called "one of the most satisfying works of one of America's more important architects." The stained glass windows were designed by Charles Connick, The first service in the new church was on August 8, 1920.

== See also ==
- National Register of Historic Places listings in Hillsborough County, New Hampshire
- All Saints Church (disambiguation)
