= Beacon Street Historic District =

Historic district in Massachusetts, United States

- U.S. National Register of Historic Places
- U.S. Historic district
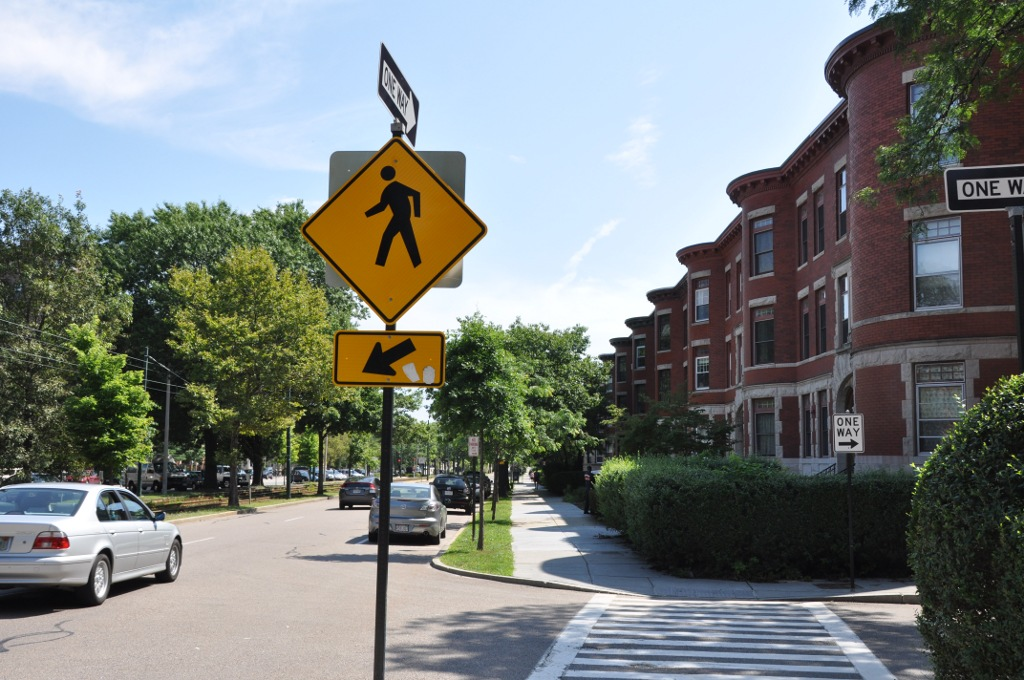
- Beacon Street near Cleveland Circle

- Location within Massachusetts Location within the United States
- Location: Roughly on Beacon St. from Saint Mary's to Ayr Rd., (most of the road's length in Brookline, Massachusetts)
- Coordinates: 42°20′23″N 71°7′56″W
- Architect: John Charles Olmsted, et al.
- Architectural style: Late 19th And 20th Century Revivals
- MPS: Brookline MRA
- NRHP reference No.: 85003322
- Added to NRHP: October 17, 1985

The Beacon Street Historic District is a historic district running most of the length of Beacon Street in Brookline, Massachusetts, roughly from Saint Mary's Road, near Kenmore Square, to Ayr Road near Cleveland Circle. It includes a small number of properties on adjacent streets, and was listed on the National Register of Historic Places in 1985.

Beacon Street in Brookline was built in 1850-51 as an extension of the road over the mill dam that was constructed across the Back Bay of Boston, running from the end of Mill Dam Road to Cleveland Circle. The area remained predominantly rural, with small clusters of housing in the Cleveland Circle and Harvard Street areas. In the 1880s industrialist Henry Whitney, a Brookline resident, conceived of the Beacon Street corridor as a broad boulevard, lined with housing, with a streetcar line running down the middle, and began purchasing land. He retained Frederick Law Olmsted and John Charles Olmsted, noted landscape designers who were also Brookline residents, to design the boulevard. When the streetcar line (now the MBTA Green Line "C" branch) went into service in December 1888, it was the second non-experimental electric streecar service in the nation, after the Union Passenger Railway of Richmond, Virginia.

Most of Beacon Street is lined with multi-story residential housing, and is still roughly in the form envisioned by Whitney and the Olmsteds. Clusters of commercial development have supplanted some of the housing in the Coolidge Corner, Washington Square, and Cleveland Circle areas, but the roughly 2-mile (3.2 km) stretch of road largely retains its residential character.

== See also ==
- National Register of Historic Places listings in Brookline, Massachusetts
