= Edward Ardolino =

Italian-American architectural sculptor (1883–1945)

- Born: November 20, 1883; Torre Le Nocelle, Italy
- Died: April 12, 1945 (aged 61); Metuchen, New Jersey, U.S.
- Burial place: Hillside Cemetery (Metuchen, New Jersey, U.S.)
- Occupations: Stone carver Architectural sculptor
- Spouse: Nicolina de Cristofaro

Ermelindo Eduardo Ardolino (November 20, 1883 – April 12, 1945), known as Edward Ardolino was an Italian-born American stone carver and architectural sculptor of the early twentieth century. He was the most prominent member of the Ardolino family of stone carvers. He worked with leading architects and sculptors, including architect Bertram Grosvenor Goodhue and sculptor Lee Lawrie. Ardolino participated in at least nine Goodhue-Lawrie collaborations including the Los Angeles Public Library and the Nebraska State Capitol. His carvings adorn a significant number of important public and private buildings and monuments, including four buildings in the Federal Triangle of Washington, D.C.

== Background ==
Ardolino was born into a long line of stone carvers on November 20, 1883, in Torre Le Nocelle, Province of Avellino, Italy. On his 1898 immigration, when he was 14, he identified himself as a sculptor. He was joining his older brother Charles (Clamanzio Celestino) Ardolino, who was a stone carver in Boston, Massachusetts. In 1900, the two brothers established a company, Ardolino Brothers, documented on their business letterhead. They contracted with others, including cousin Ralph (Angelo Raffaele) Ardolino, to assist in fulfilling their commissions.

In 1907, Edward Ardolino married Nicolina de Cristofaro, and together they had four children. Ardolino moved the family frequently as his early career took him throughout the northeastern United States, the Midwest and Canada. In the 1920s, he settled his family in Metuchen, New Jersey.

From 1914 to 1916, Edward assumed responsibility for the company when Charles went abroad to create fountains for their hometown's first public water system. In 1916, Ardolino Brothers formed a partnership with Giuseppe and Raffaele Menconi of Menconi Brothers of New York City under the name Menconi and Ardolino Brothers. They maintained offices in New York, Boston, Chicago and Toronto. In 1920, Edward, acting on his own, formed another partnership called Ricci, Ardolino and Di Lorenzo.

The following year Edward dissolved his business relationship with his brother Charles and founded his own company, Edward Ardolino, Inc., with offices in New York City and Philadelphia. Charles operated under the original company name Ardolino Brothers in conjunction with his son Angelo and his father John until his passing in 1926.

Between 1929 and 1931, Edward Ardolino designed, created and installed a marble and bronze war memorial for his town of birth. The monument incorporates a bronze figure of Winged Victory of Samothrace. In 2013, the war monument was restored with a grant from the Italian government.

Edward Ardolino died on April 12, 1945, in Metuchen, New Jersey.

== Career ==
Early in his career Ardolino worked with leading American architects and sculptors. He had a number of commissions in conjunction with Carrère and Hastings, who made their mark in 1911 with their design for the New York Public Library.

Other early commissions included joint projects of the well-respected architect Bertram Grosvenor Goodhue and sculptor Lee Lawrie. Ardolino executed carvings for them in styles ranging from Gothic Revival, such as the West Point Chapel, to what became known as Art Deco, exemplified by the Los Angeles Public Library and the Nebraska State Capitol. The latter two are arguably the most innovative works of Goodhue's career and were ranked in the top 120 architectural sites in a recent study of America's favorite buildings.

Goodhue publicly advocated for Ardolino to win contracts on his projects, saying he had "proved his ability to grasp and execute in stone the character desired by Mr. Lawrie." After Goodhue's death in 1924, Ardolino continued to work with Lawrie, the recipient of prestigious architectural and sculptural awards. Most of the Goodhue and Lawrie collaborations fulfilled in conjunction with Ardolino were invited into historic registers or achieved landmark status.

=== Goodhue and Lawrie Projects ===
- West Point Chapel (1906–1910), West Point, NY
- Saint Thomas Church, (reredos, initiated in 1918) (stone cross, completed in 1923) New York, NY (Note: Designated as Historic or Landmark Status) (Note: Carvers included Ralph Ardolino) (Note: Ralph Adams Cram is also credited as architect in "A Walking Tour of Saint Thomas Church," 1 W. 53rd St., NY, NY. Undated pamphlet.)
- Church of St. Vincent Ferrer (1914–1918, interior; 1919, statue, Porta Coeli), New York, NY
- Trinity English Lutheran Church (designed in 1923), Fort Wayne, Indiana
- Los Angeles Public Library (1924–1926), Los Angeles, California
- Rockefeller Chapel (1925–1928), University of Chicago (Note: Ulric Ellerhusen designed the sculptural program above the 30' mark.)
- Christ Church Cranbrook (1925–1929), Bloomfield Hills, Michigan
- Church of the Heavenly Rest, (1926–1929; reredos completed in 1938) (Note: Initial sculpture program by Lee Lawrie; reredos designed by Earl N. Thorp.) New York, NY (Note: Mayers Murray & Phillip completed Goodhue's project upon his death.)
- Nebraska State Capitol (1922–1934), Lincoln, Nebraska (Note: Exterior panels reportedly carved by Ardolino employee Alessandro Berretta)

=== The Federal Triangle ===
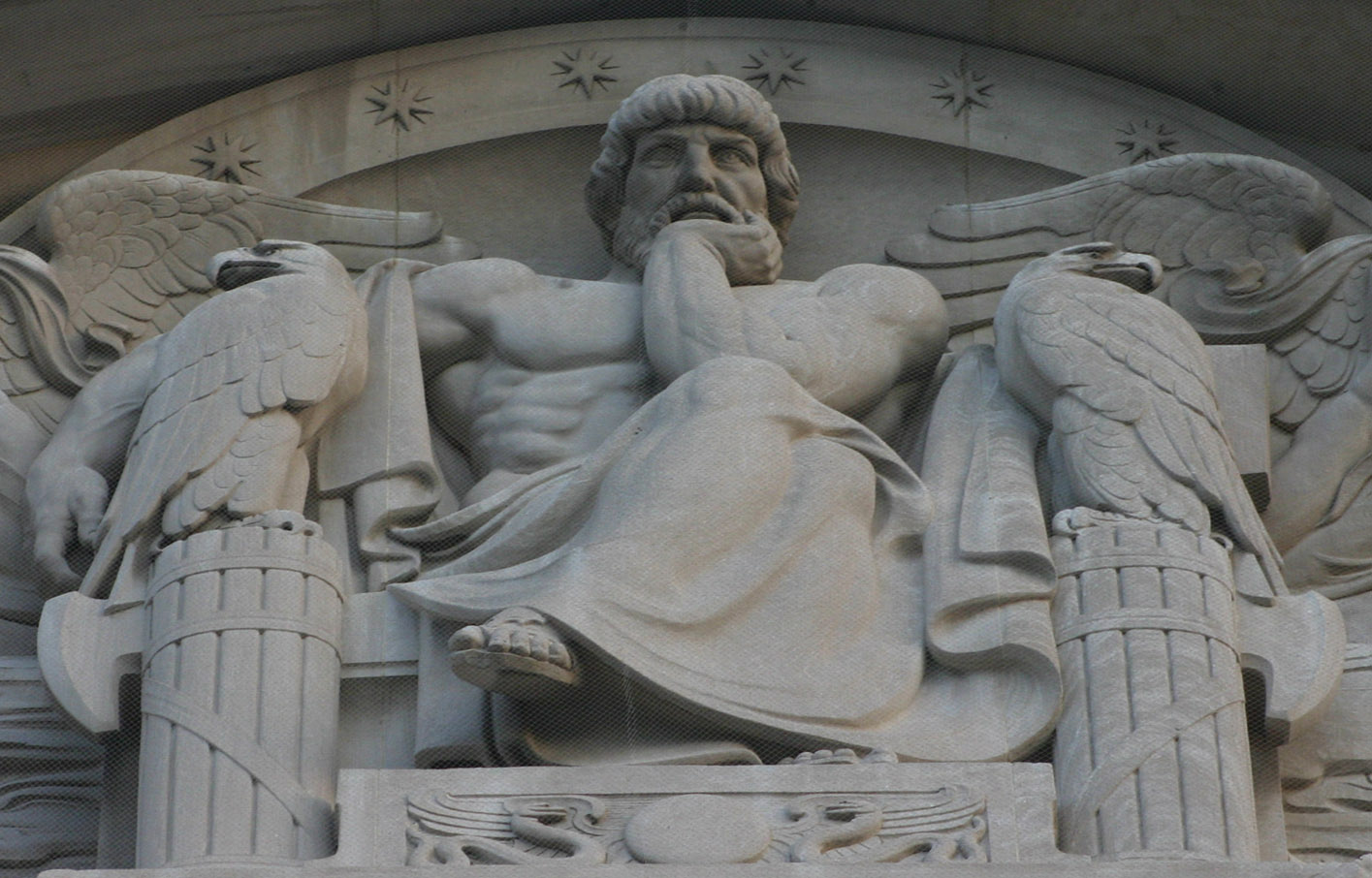
Destiny pediment, National Archives Building, sculpted by Weinman, carved by Ardolino

In the early 1930s when the Federal Triangle was being developed, Ardolino was on a short list of nationally known stone carvers. In the opinion of highly respected architect John Russell Pope, there were only three New York firms whose carvings would be "properly done". They were Edward Ardolino, John Donnelly, and Piccirilli Brothers. During this period Ardolino was awarded commissions for four federal buildings. All four reside within a designated historical district.

- The Department of Commerce Building, designed by architects York and Sawyer, was constructed from 1927 to 1932. The modeling firm was Ricci and Zari. Ardolino's carvings include: the eagles along the cornice of the 14th Street façade, the third floor keystones, four panels at each of four driveway entrances, and eight urns.
- The Department of the Post Office, later called the Federal Building, was designed by Delano and Aldrich and built between 1931 and 1934. Edward Ardolino company carved the metopes (Adolph Alexander Weinman, sculptor) and keystones (modeled by Ricci Studios). At the height of the Post office carving in 1933, Ardolino employed at least 36 carvers.
- The Departmental Auditorium, designed by architect Arthur Brown Jr., was constructed from 1931 to 1936. Edward Ardolino company carved the Constitution Avenue pediment "Columbia" (Edgar Walter, sculptor) and also the nearby panels in the upper right and left corners behind the columns (Léon Hermant, sculptor) and the panel and spandrels above the central arch behind the columns (Edmond Amateis, sculptor).
- The National Archives Building, designed by architect John Russell Pope in partnership with Otto R. Eggers and Daniel Paul Higgins, was erected between 1933 and 1935. Ardolino carved the Pennsylvania Avenue pediment "Destiny", for sculptor Adolph Alexander Weinman. The sculptor approved so strongly of Ardolino's role in executing the pedimental sculpture he invited him to add his name to the limestone pediment. Nowhere else in the Federal Triangle does a building bear the name of a carver.

=== Historic/landmark works ===
- Portland City Hall (1908–1912), Carrère and Hastings, architects; 389 Congress St., Portland, ME
- General Post Office Building of New York (1912; now the James A. Farley Building), McKim, Mead & White, architects; 421 Eighth Ave. bet. 31st and 33rd Sts., New York, NY
- University Museum of the University of Pennsylvania (1912 addition; carving of sculpted groups), Cope and Stewardson, architect; Philadelphia, PA (Note: Documented on the business letterhead of Edward Ardolino in the Lee Lawrie Papers, Library of Congress, Washington, D.C.)
- Bank of Montreal (1913, interior), McKim, Mead & White, architect; 335 Main St., Winnipeg, Canada
- Henry C. Frick Residence (1912–1914; renamed the Frick Collection; two pediments, one modeled by Attillio Piccirilli and the other by Philip Martiny), Carrère and Hastings, architect; Piccirilli Brothers, sculptor; New York, NY
- First National Bank Building (1912–1914; became First Wisconsin National Bank Building) D. H. Burnham & Company, architect; 735 N. Water St., Milwaukee, WI
- Continental and Commercial Banking (1914), Graham, Anderson, Probst & White, D. H. Burnham & Company, architects; Chicago, IL
- Royal Bank of Canada (1915; modeling and carving of marble work), Carrère and Hastings, architect; 2 King St. East, Toronto, Canada
- Q Street Bridge or Dumbarton Bridge (1914–1915; also known as Indian Head Bridge), Glenn Brown (architect); Washington, D.C.
- Temple of the Scottish Rites of Free Masonry (1911–1915; carvers included Ralph Ardolino), John Russell Pope, architect; Adolph Alexander Weinman, sculptor; 1733 16th St., NW, Washington, D.C.
- Notre Dame Church (1915 expansion; statuary), Cross & Cross, architect; 40 Morningside Dr., New York, NY
- Massachusetts State House (1917 addition; originally referenced as Boston State House; columns and pilasters of the East and West Wings), Sturgis, Chapman & Andrews, architect; Boston. MA
- Durant Building (1919–1921; also known as the General Motors Building and Cadillac Place, carved doorways), Albert Kahn, architect, Ulysses Ricci, sculptor; 3044 West Grand Blvd. Detroit, MI
- Standard Oil Building (1920–1925; annex; carvers included Ralph and Arthur Ardolino), Carrère and Hastings, architect; associated architects, Shreve, Lamb and Blake; 26 Broadway, New York, NY
- Field Museum (1921), D.H. Burnham & Company; associate architect William Pierce Anderson; Henry Hering, sculptor; 1400 S. Lake Shore Dr., Chicago, IL
- Free Church of St. Mary the Virgin (1921; marble spire over the Tabernacle of the High Altar), Ricci, Ardolino and Di Lorenzo; 145 W. 46th St., New York, NY
- Magnolia Petroleum Building (1921–1922; became the Magnolia Hotel), Alfred C. Bossom, Lang & Witchell, Associated Architects; Ulysses Ricci, sculptor; Dallas, TX
- Trinity Parish, Chapel of the Intercession (1923; became Church of the Intercession, baptismal font), Bertram Grosvenor Goodhue of Cram, Goodhue and Ferguson, architect; Broadway and 155th St., New York, NY
- Insurance Company of North America (1925; became Phoenix Condominiums), Stewardson & Page, architect; 1600 Arch St., Philadelphia, PA
- Drexel Building (1925–1927; became a bank in the 1930s), Charles Z. Klauder, architect; 135–143 S. 15th and Walnut Sts., Philadelphia, PA
- Boy Scouts of America Philadelphia Council (1926–1929); became the Bruce Marks Scout Resource Center of the Cradle of Liberty Council, Charles Z. Klauder, architect; Logan Square, 22nd & Winter Sts., Philadelphia, PA
- New York Telephone Building (1927; became the Barclay-Vesey Building, now the Verizon Building; carvers included Ralph and Arthur Ardolino), McKenzie, Voorhees and Gmelin, architect; Ulysses Ricci, sculptor; 140 West St., New York, NY
- St. Bartholomew's Church Parish House (1927; known as the Community House; tympanum above doorway), McKim, Mead & White, architect; Rene Chambellan, sculptor; New York, NY
- Canadian Bank of Commerce, (1929–1931; became Commerce Court North), John A. Pearson, and York and Sawyer, architects; 25 King St., W. Toronto, Ontario, Canada
- Knowles Memorial Chapel (1931–1932; tympanum above doorway on campanile), Ralph Adams Cram of Cram and Ferguson, architect; Wm. F. Ross, sculptor, Rollins College, 1100 Holt Ave., Winter Park FL
- U.S. Courthouse (1932–1936; carvers included Ralph Ardolino), Cass Gilbert and Cass Gilbert, Jr., architect; 40 Centre St., Foley Sq., New York, NY
- Cathedral of St. John the Divine (1892–in progress; nave, baptistery and west front; carvers included Ralph and Arthur Ardolino), Heins & LaFarge, and Ralph Adams Cram, architects; John Angel and Lee Lawrie, sculptors; 1047 Amsterdam Ave., between 110th & 113th Sts., New York, NY
- Cathedral of Learning (1926–1937; interior archways leading to first floor rooms), Charles Z. Klauder, architect; Joseph Gattoni, stonework designer and carver; University of Pittsburgh, PA
- The Stephens Collins Foster Memorial (1937), Charles Z. Klauder, architect; University of Pittsburgh, PA
- Heinz Memorial Chapel (1935–1938), Charles Z. Klauder, architect; Charles J. Connick Studio, stained glass artist, 5th and Bellefield Avenues, University of Pittsburgh, PA

=== Other works ===
- Connecticut State Library (1908–1910, four marble figures), Donn Barber and E.T. Hapgood, architects; Francois Michael Louis Tonetti, sculptor; 231 Capitol Ave., Hartford, CT
- Whitney National Bank (1911; became Hancock Bank of Mississippi, purchased in 2019 to become a boutique hotel), Emile Weil in collaboration with Clinton and Russell, architects; 228 St. Charles Ave., New Orleans, LA
- Bank of Toronto (1913; razed in 1965), Carrère and Hastings, architects, and Eustace B. Bird, Associated Architects; corner of Bay and King Ave., Toronto, Ontario, Canada
- Registry Office Building (1915; razed in 1965), John M. Lyle, architect; Elizabeth and Arthur Sts., Toronto, Ontario, Canada
- USS Maine Mast Monument (1915; Ralph Ardolino, carver), Norcross Brothers, builders Arlington National Cemetery, Washington, D.C.
- Massachusetts Institute of Technology's 1916 Campus (1912–1915; initially referenced as New Technical Building), William Welles Bosworth, architect; 77 Massachusetts Ave., Cambridge, MA
- C. Ledyard Blair Residence, (1913–1917; originally referenced as the Philips House; razed in 1931; carvers included Ralph and Arthur Ardolino), Thomas Hastings of Carrère and Hastings, architect; 2 E. 70th St./884 Fifth Ave., New York, NY
- Dr. John A. Harriss Residence (1918 additions and revisions; now razed; Harriss is credited with bringing traffic lights to Manhattan) J.H. Friedlander, architect; Long Neck Point, Noroton, Connecticut
- Staten Island Court Building (1912–1919; originally referenced as Richmond County Court House; interior), Carrère and Hastings, architect; Staten Island, NY
- National State Bank (1919; became Wells Fargo; carvings now concealed), Dennison & Hirons, architect; 68 Broad St., Elizabeth, NJ
- Arlington Memorial Amphitheater (1913–1920; Ralph Ardolino carved amphitheater and urns), Carrère and Hastings, architect; Ulysses Ricci, sculptor; Arlington, VA
- Harkness Memorial Tower* (1917–1921), James Gamble Rogers, architect; Lee Lawrie, sculptor; and Yale Memorial Quadrangle Buildings (1921), New Haven, CT
- Seaboard National Bank (1919–1921; became JP Morgan Chase), Alfred C. Bossom, architect; SE corner of Broad and Beaver St., New York, NY
- Guaranty Trust Company (1919–1921; became Morgan Guaranty Trust Company; granite entranceway), Cross & Cross, architect; Ulysses Ricci, sculptor; Corner of Fifth Ave. and 44th St. New York, NY
- Carved Chair Presented to President Warren G. Harding (1921), modeled by Ricci, Ardolino and Di Lorenzo
- The Stanford White Memorial Doors (1922), Andrew O'Connor, Philip Martiny, Herbert Adams, Adolph Alexander Weinman and Ulysses Ricci, sculptors; Ricci, Ardolino and Di Lorenzo and Piccirilli Brothers, ornamentation; New York University, New York, NY
- S.W. Straus and Company Building (1921), Warren and Wetmore, architect; Leo Lentelli, sculptor; 565 Fifth Av., New York, NY
- Fifth Avenue Hospital (1922; became Terence Cardinal Cooke Health Care Center), York and Sawyer, architect; 1249 Fifth Ave. at 106th St., New York, NY
- Princeton University Chapel (1925–1928), Cram and Ferguson, architect; John Angel, sculptor; Princeton, NJ
- American Bank & Trust Company (1929; carving of sculptured panels, "American Prudence" and "National Wisdom"), Dunlap Davis and William Pope Barney, architects; Leo Friedlander sculptor; NW corner of S. 15th and Sansome Sts., Philadelphia, PA
- Dwight Memorial Chapel (1931 remodel; also referenced as Yale University Chapel), Charles Z. Klauder, architect; Henry Austin, original architect, 1842–46; New Haven, CT
- U.S. Custom House (1933; aluminum bas-relief sculpture and lamps), Ritter and Shay, architect; Bounded by Chestnut, Second and Third Sts., Philadelphia, PA
- Loockerman Street Bridge (1934; modeled the marble consoles on the parapets), Edward William Martin, architect; Dover, Delaware
- Equal Justice and Law and Order (1935–1938; two sculptures on the East and West sides of the front entrance to the U.S. Court & Custom House), Mauran, Russell, Crowell and Mullgardt, architect; Benjamin Franklin Hawkins, sculptor; St. Louis, MO

== Legacy ==
Throughout his career Ardolino won commissions that ranged widely in geographic location and type – from corporate and university structures, to government buildings, houses of worship and opulent residences. Experts like Ralph Adams Cram, supervising architect of Princeton University Chapel, shared credit for the chapel's quality with Ardolino in particular, saying his stone carving was "the best of its kind". Ardolino was also credited as the building's sole carver.

Edward Ardolino's papers were not archived upon his death, so his total number of commissions is unknown. Nearly a dozen are attributed to him only through extant copies of his business letterhead. Of his known works, over 60 percent achieved landmark or historic status or reside within an historical district.

== See also ==
- Pedimental sculptures in the United States

== Bibliography ==
- Aumonier, William, ed. (January 1, 1930). Modern Architectural Sculpture (First ed.). New York: Charles Scribner's Sons, The Architectural Press. pp. 63, 69, 77. ASIN B001IVMT2W.
- Breisch, Kenneth A. (2016). The Los Angeles Central Library: Building an Architectural Icon, 1872–1933. Architecture Series. Foreword by Kevin Starr. Los Angeles, California: Getty Research Institute. p. 103. ISBN 9781606064900.
- Eckert, Kathryn Bishop (2001). Cranbrook: An Architectural Tour. New York: Princeton Architectural Press. p. 60. ISBN 9781568982571 – via Google Books.
- Gayle, Margot; Look, David W.; Waite, John G. (1998). "Part 2". Metals in America's Historic Buildings. Washington, D.C.: Diane Publishing. p. 87. ISBN 9780160380730. OCLC 26722649 – via U.S. Department of the Interior, National Park Service, Cultural Resources, Preservation Assistance.
- Gurney, George (1985). Sculpture and the Federal Triangle. Washington, D.C.: Smithsonian Institution Press. ISBN 9780874744927.
- Harm, Gregory Paul; Harm, Susanne Patricia (2009). Lee Lawrie's Prairie Deco History in Stone At the Nebraska State Capitol (Hardcover). Austin, Texas: Gregory Paul Harm and Susanne Patricia Harm. pp. 32, 33, 41. ISBN 9780615266336.
- Marter, Joan M., ed. (2011). The Grove Encyclopedia of American Art. Vol. I. Oxford, New York: Oxford University Press. p. 145. ISBN 978-0195335798 – via Google Books.
- Parker, Charles Wolcott; Greene, Barnet M., eds. (1930). Who's who in Canada, 1930–31. Vol. 21. Bahamas: International Press. p. 398.
- Wright, John Robert (2001). Saint Thomas Church Fifth Avenue. Grand Rapids, MI, and NY, NY: William B. Eerdmans Publishing Company and Saint Thomas Church Fifth Avenue. p. 134, Footnote 39. ISBN 9780802839121.
