= Princeton University Chapel =

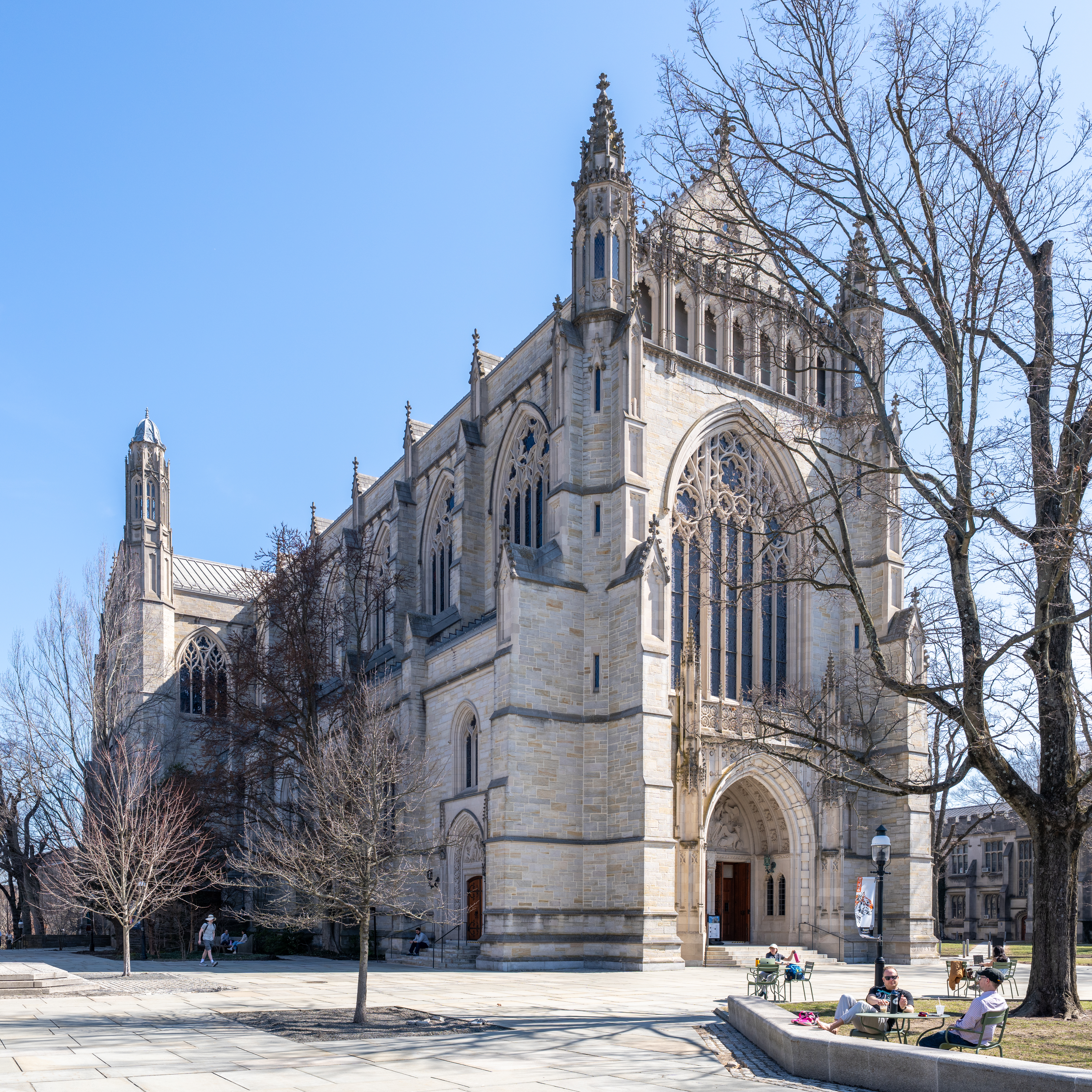
- (2026)
- Princeton University Chapel
- Location: Princeton, New Jersey
- Country: United States
- Denomination: Ecumenical
- Website: www.princeton.edu/religiouslife/chapel/

History
- Consecrated: 1928

Architecture
- Functional status: Active
- Architect: Ralph Adams Cram
- Architectural type: Cathedral
- Style: Collegiate Gothic
- Groundbreaking: 1924
- Completed: 1928
- Construction cost: US$2.3 million

Specifications
- Capacity: almost 2,000
- Length: 277 feet (84 m)
- Width: 76 feet (23 m)
- Height: 121 feet (37 m)
- Materials: Sandstone, limestone

Clergy
- Dean: Alison Boden, Dean of the Chapel
- Princeton University Chapel
- U.S. Historic district – Contributing property
- Location within Mercer County, New Jersey Location within New Jersey Location within the United States
- Coordinates: 40°20′56.0″N 74°39′24.8″W
- Part of: Princeton Historic District (ID75001143)
- Added to NRHP: 27 June 1975

The Princeton University Chapel is a Collegiate Gothic chapel located on that university's main campus in Princeton, New Jersey, United States. It replaces an older chapel that burned down in 1920. Designed in 1921 by Ralph Adams Cram in his signature style, it was built by the university between 1924 and 1928 at a cost of $2.3 million. The chapel was rededicated in an interfaith ceremony in 2002 following a major two-year restoration.

Its size and design evoke a small cathedral of the English Middle Ages. The only university chapel of its size at the time it was built was King's College Chapel at the University of Cambridge. The foundation is poured concrete, and the superstructure is sandstone and limestone. The main sanctuary consists of a narthex, a gallery, a nave, two transepts joined by a crossing, and an elevated choir.

The chapel's extensive iconography consists of stained glass, stonemasonry, and wood carvings. Among the stained glass are four "great windows", one facing each cardinal direction, and four "Christian epic" windows in the walls of the choir. The iconography was planned by Albert M. Friend, a faculty member in Princeton's Department of Art and Archaeology, with the goal of portraying, in one scholar's words, a "synthesis between Christian faith and modern thought."

The chapel seats almost 2,000 people. A nondenominational chapel, it hosts weekly ecumenical Christian services and daily Catholic Masses. It also hosts several annual special events, such as baccalaureate services and commencements.

== History ==
Princeton University built the chapel to replace the Marquand Chapel, which stood between where the present chapel and McCosh Hall stand until it burned to the ground in 1920. The location for the new chapel was chosen for two reasons: symbolically, the new chapel would rise from the ashes of the old one, and practically, it would locate the new chapel centrally as the campus expanded eastward.

Ralph Adams Cram, the university's supervising architect, designed and oversaw construction of the new chapel. Cram sought to build a crown jewel for the Collegiate Gothic motif he had championed on the Princeton campus. The university's president, John Grier Hibben, also had a stake in the project: student hostility toward Princeton's brand of mainline Presbyterianism was on the rise. An ordained minister, Hibben hoped the new chapel's majesty would inspire students to attend services of their own volition. Cram, a convert to High Church Episcopalianism from Unitarianism, also lent support to this aim.

Cram designed the chapel with the assistance of Alexander Hoyle, a member of his firm. Albert M. Friend, a faculty member in Princeton's Department of Art and Archaeology, played a central role in planning the iconography. It was built by Matthews Construction Company, which worked on several projects on Princeton's campus. Among those who contributed to the design of stained glass windows were Charles Connick, Henry Lee Willet (of the studio that would become Willet Hauser), and Philadelphia-based stained glass artist Nicola D'Ascenzo.

The plans for the new chapel were made public in 1921. Hibben called replacing the Marquand Chapel "an immediate necessity"; nonetheless, the project encountered financial problems early on. The insurance money from the Marquand Chapel was insufficient, and fundraising for the chapel competed with an ongoing general capital campaign for the university. Ground was broken during Princeton's commencement ceremonies in June 1924, and in the following year Cram and Hibben laid the cornerstone. The construction received considerable media attention, as it promised to be the largest university chapel in the United States and the second largest in the world after King's College Chapel, Cambridge. The construction cost about $2.3 million and was completed in 1928. Hibben led the dedication ceremony on May 31 of that year, in an elaborate ceremony covered by TIME.

On March 13, 1960, less than six weeks after the first of the Greensboro sit-ins, Martin Luther King Jr., delivered a sermon at the chapel. In the sermon he called for universal brotherhood and a life of spiritual richness. A plaque on the interior south wall of the chapel's nave commemorates the occasion.

The chapel underwent a two-year, $10 million restoration between 2000 and 2002. Despite the complexity of the work, the chapel remained open throughout the restoration. The project earned a New Jersey Historic Preservation Award in 2002, and the stone work won the 2004 Tucker Award for Renovation and Restoration from Stone World magazine. At the time, two experts working on the stained glass restoration called it the largest such project that had ever been undertaken in the United States; too large for a single studio, it was divided among studios in Massachusetts, Pennsylvania, and New York.

Following the restoration, the chapel was rededicated in an interfaith ceremony in which people belonging to Buddhism, Christianity, Islam, and Judaism gave prayers. Leading the ceremony, then-Dean of Religious Life Thomas Breidenthal said, "This edifice is unmistakably Christian, [but] this chapel is meant to belong to all of us."

== Description ==
The chapel's Collegiate Gothic design evokes an English church of the Middle Ages, although several aspects of it, including the vault and its supports, recall French churches. The chapel is cruciform and is built on the scale of a large parish church or a small cathedral. The only precedent for a university chapel of this size was King's College Chapel, and only a small part of that chapel was used regularly. Stillwell cites Exeter Cathedral and the Octagon tower of Ely Cathedral as precedents for the architectural detail, but notes that the Princeton chapel's detail nonetheless differs significantly from these.

The foundation is made of poured concrete. When the chapel was built, the rest of the structure above the grade level was masonry, and the only metal reinforcement was some structural steel in the framing of the roof. During the 2000–2002 restoration, some pinnacles were reset with stainless steel anchors. The arches of the crossing were designed to support the addition of a central tower, but this option has not been exercised: in Bush and Kemeny's words, "Cram felt that Princeton already had enough towers."

=== Exterior ===
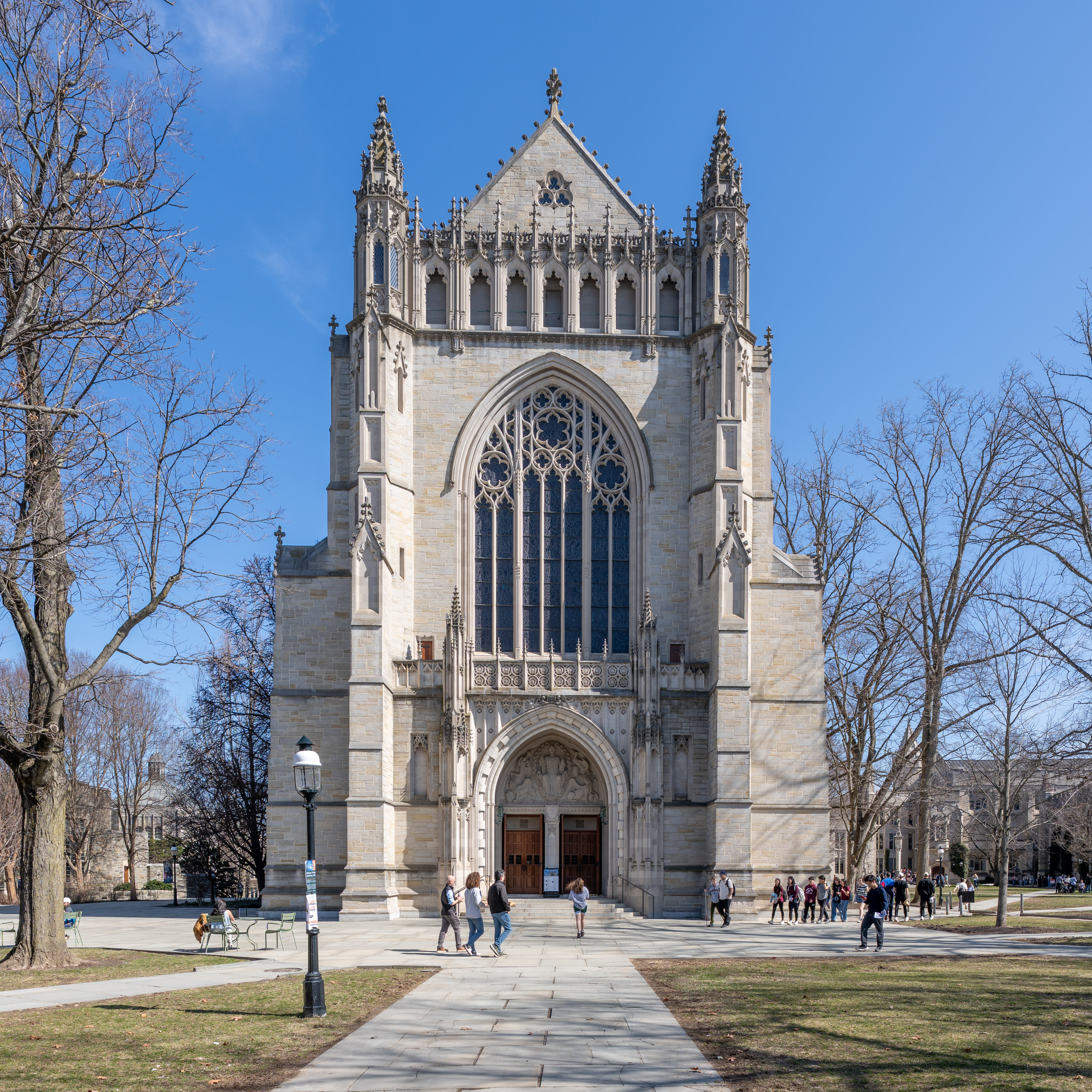
The exterior, seen from the west

The chapel is approximately the size of a small medieval English cathedral. Measured on the exterior, it is 277 feet (84 m) long, 76 feet (23 m) wide at its transepts, and 121 feet (37 m) high. These dimensions make it about the same size as Ripon Cathedral. The exterior is constructed largely from Pennsylvania sandstone, with Indiana limestone used for the trim.

On the western end of the chapel is the narthex, which has entrances on the north, west, and south walls. An additional door on the chapel's north side opens onto the Hibben Garden, named in recognition of John Grier Hibben's role in the chapel's construction and dedication. The garden of evergreens was designed by H. Russell Butler, Jr. On the chapel's south side are an additional door at ground level to the east and an exterior pulpit, designed after one at Magdalen College, Oxford, and named Bright Pulpit, in honor of John Bright. The chapel is connected on its eastern side to Dickinson Hall by the Rothschild arch, symbolizing a connection between religion and scholarship. Cram resigned as Princeton's supervising architect over the inclusion of the arch, which he disliked; nonetheless, he participated in the chapel's 1928 dedication ceremony. Nearby is the Mather Sundial, a replica of the Turnbull Sundial in the courtyard of Corpus Christi College, Oxford. A statue of a pelican, a religious symbol associated with Corpus Christi, sits atop the sundial, which was presented to Princeton in 1907 by William Mather, then the governor of Victoria University of Manchester.

Each of the three narthex entrances sits below a tympanum. The model for the tympanum above the main, west entrance was designed and sculpted in clay by John Angel and carved in stone by Edward Ardolino. Cram shared credit for the chapel's quality with Ardolino in particular, saying his stone carving was "the best of its kind." Ardolino is credited as executing all of the building's stone carving.

The tympanum above the west entrance depicts Jesus as described in the Book of Revelation, together with the four beasts and other relevant iconography. It resembles the tympanum of the Royal Portal of Chartres Cathedral. Beneath the figure of Christ is Princeton University's shield, illustrating the university's motto, Dei sub numine viget ("Under the power of God she flourishes"). The tympana above the north and south entrances depict the Annunciation and the Baptism of Christ, respectively. The latter was sculpted by Robert Baker.

The exterior iconography includes two notable whimsical elements. A downspout on the east wall features a relief of a bulldog head; a decades-old myth relates that Cram placed it there to recognize Yale University, whose mascot is the bulldog. (Cram was not a Yale alumnus and in fact did not attend college, so it is unclear what interest he might have had promoting Yale.) A sculptor who worked on the chapel during its construction placed small carvings of his face and Cram's at the bottoms of crockets flanking the main entrance; Cram is identifiable by his eyeglasses.

Aerial view looking south-southwest, December 2025

The Office of Religious Life calls the chapel the third-largest university chapel in the world. According to Milliner, it also ranks among the tallest in height. In maximum height Princeton's chapel, which does not have a tower or other appendages, is exceeded only by the belltower of the Basilica of the Sacred Heart at the University of Notre Dame, the tower of the Duke University Chapel, the tower of the University of Chicago's Rockefeller Chapel, and the campanile of Valparaiso University in Indiana's Chapel of the Resurrection. In height of the nave at the crossing it is second only to King's College Chapel at the University of Cambridge.

=== Interior ===
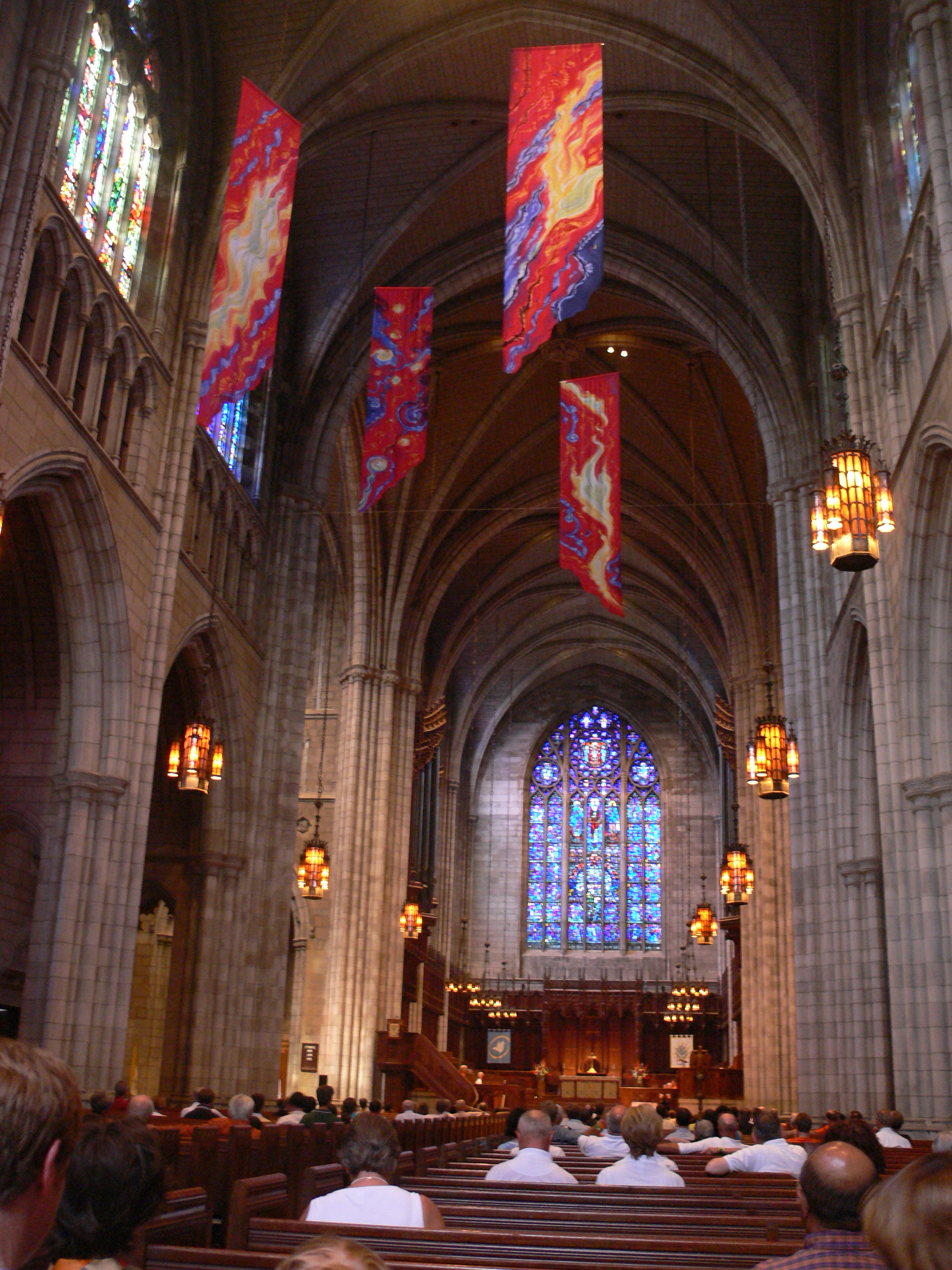
The interior, looking east from about halfway through the nave. The choir and the east window, titled "The Love of Christ", are in the background.

Measured in the interior, the chapel is 249 feet (76 m) long, 93.5 feet (28 m) wide at its transepts, and 78.5 feet (24 m) high at the crossing. Most of the interior is limestone, but the aisles and the central area of the choir are Aquia Creek sandstone. Sound-absorbing tile is mounted on parts of the wall and vault. Running west to east, the main sanctuary consists of a narthex, a gallery, a nave, two transepts joined by a crossing, and an elevated choir; it seats almost 2,000. The building's southeast corner houses a vestry.

Inscribed on the narthex wall facing the nave is "A Prayer for Princeton", which as of 2008 was still used in services at the chapel. Another inscription, from Psalm 100, refers to Westminster Choir College, which holds its commencement ceremonies in the chapel. Two staircases on the east and west of the narthex lead to an upper gallery, which looks out upon the nave.

Three doorways lead from the narthex into the nave, which is 74 feet (23 m) high and named for Hibben. It is divided into three vertical levels: an arcade at ground level, a triforium beneath the roofs of the aisles, and a clerestory. The configuration and its proportions are typical of English churches, but the nave's vaulted ceiling and the colonnettes supporting it recall French churches. The gallery above the narthex is at the level of the triforium. The aisles are narrower than in medieval churches and are used for passage rather than seating. The south aisle features five window bays, while the north has four; where the easternmost bay would be is the entrance to a side chapel called the Blessed Sacrament Chapel. The pews in the nave are constructed from wood originally intended for Civil War gun carriages; over 100 carvers spent more than a year producing the intricate carvings.

The northern transept is named for Henry Gurdon Marquand, the benefactor of the Marquand Chapel, which burned to the ground in 1920 and which the present chapel was built to replace. An American flag flown by the USS Princeton hangs from the transept's north wall. The southern transept is named for Chester Alwyn Braman, the first donor to the University Chapel Fund. A staircase leads from the Braman Transept to the Bright Pulpit.

The choir, named Milbank Choir for Elizabeth Milbank Anderson is elevated by several steps. An altar stands at the far east end. The altar and the choir stalls were built and carved by Irving and Casson, A. H. Davenport Company, in Sherwood Forest oak; Cram speculated that the wood may have dated from the time of Robin Hood. According to Stillwell, the woodwork "represents an outstanding example of American craftsmanship."

A pulpit of oak stands in front of the choir facing the nave. It originated in the north of France, probably in the mid-1500s. Its French Renaissance style suggests that it was made during the reign of Henry II. The lectern is also oak and dates from the 1600s. It had been used in a church near Avranches, France, for 200 years. A private individual purchased it shortly before the confiscation of church property during the French Revolution. It changed hands several times before Hibben obtained it for the chapel.

The chapel's organ has 7,897 pipes in 135 ranks and 109 stops. It was designed by Ernest M. Skinner and installed in 1928. Skinner invented the Contra Fagotto stop for the Princeton chapel organ in response to a request by Princeton's director of music. In 1990 the organ was dismantled and shipped to England for a major restoration by Mander Organs. Thomas Trotter gave the re-opening recital on the restored organ in 1992.

=== Iconography ===
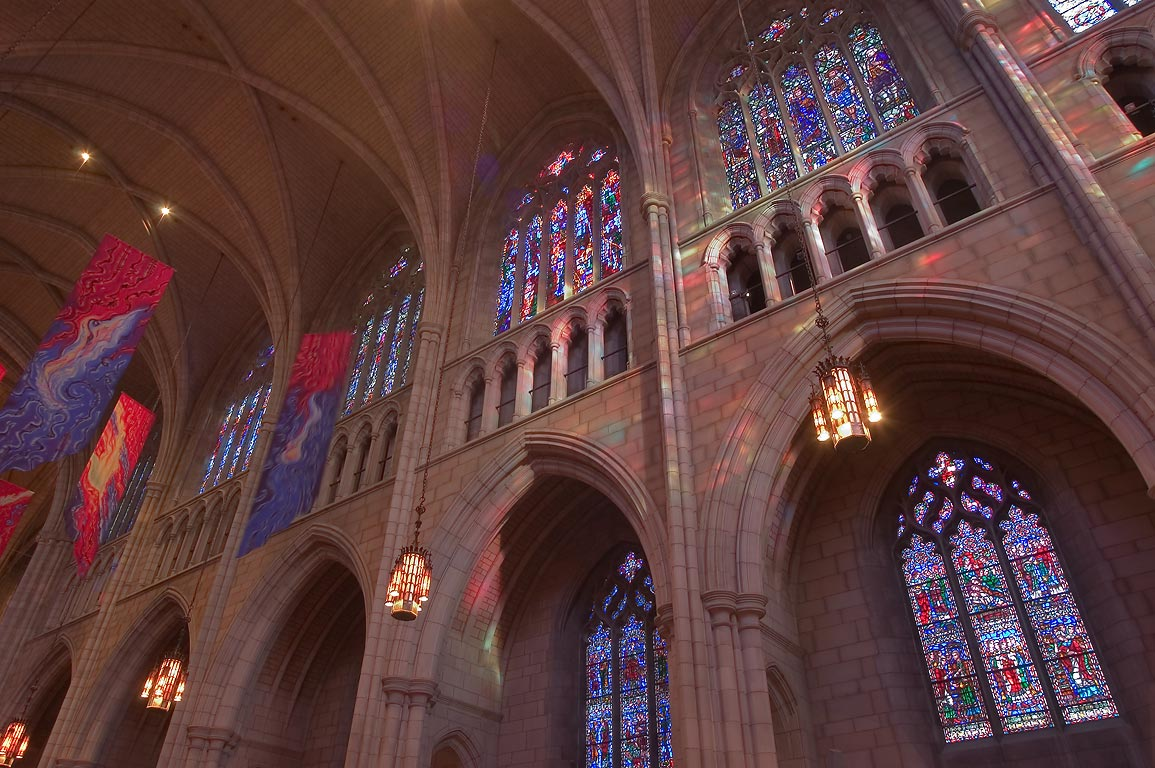
The interior south wall of the nave. James Madison is shown in brown and royal blue in the rightmost panel of the upper right window.

The chapel's iconography consists of over 10,000 square feet (930 m^{2}) of stained glass as well as stonework and wood carvings. Albert M. Friend, a faculty member in Princeton's Department of Art and Archaeology and an expert on medieval art, was the primary planner of the iconography, with the support and assistance of Hibben, Cram, and others. A devout Christian, Friend shared Hibben's goal of persuading Princeton students to choose lives of Christian observance and sought with the chapel's iconography, in Milliner's words, "to carefully dismantle materialist objections to Christian faith and to articulate Princeton's synthesis between Christian faith and modern thought." Kessler calls the stained glass "a summa of the heritage of Christianity up to the early twentieth century."

The stained glass windows of the nave's north and south aisles represent one aspect of this synthesis. The north windows depict Biblical figures and scenes, while the south windows contain images associated with human knowledge. The lower of these, at the triforium level, depict the teachings of Christ, while the six upper windows at the clerestory level depict influential figures in Philosophy, Theology, Chivalry, Poetry, Law, and Science, as read from east to west. The Science window faces a window due to Willet on the north wall with scenes from Genesis, symbolizing harmony between the Christian story of the Creation and the modern means of understanding it.

Four large stained glass windows are found in the main sanctuary.

- The Great East Window, "The Love of Christ": Milbank Choir. Due to Charles Connick, it is richly decorated with scenes from the life of Christ, culminating with an image of the Crucifixion of Jesus in the great rose. The process of selecting the scenes for this window was contentious, pitting the preferences of the conservative Presbyterian Hibben and his colleagues against those of the Milbank family, the window's donors and liberal Episcopalians. The final compromise paired the Works of Mercy with Gospel scenes complementing each of them.
- The Great West Window, "The Second Coming of Christ": the gallery. Due to Nicola d'Ascenzo of Philadelphia, this window epitomizes Friend's iconographical argument. To students who would complain of the burdens of religion in daily life, the window answers with John 10:10: "I am come that they might have life and that they might have it more abundantly."
- The Great North Window, "Christ the Martyr": Marquand Transept. A verse from Mark 13:13, "He who shall endure to the end shall be saved", is carved below the window, declaring the theme. The lower part of the window shows historical Christians noted for their perseverance.
- The Great South Window, "Christ the Teacher": Braman Transept. Here again the theme is declared by a Gospel verse, this time John 8:32, "And ye shall know the truth and the truth shall make you free." Noted Christian writers and teachers are depicted at the bottom with the seven liberal arts.

The doorway to the Blessed Sacrament Chapel on the north wall of the nave is topped by carvings of shields representing three Christian religious centers, Jerusalem, Rome, and Canterbury, and flanked by carvings representing the seven virtues and corresponding seven vices. The other door leaving the Blessed Sacrament Chapel is topped by carvings of shields representing three medieval universities, Oxford, Paris, and Salamanca, and flanked by carvings representing the seven liberal arts (the Trivium and the Quadrivium) and the seven gifts of the Holy Spirit.

Large stained glass windows due to Connick in the walls of the choir retell four "Christian epics": the Divine Comedy and Le Morte d'Arthur on the north wall and Paradise Lost and Pilgrim's Progress on the south wall. Milliner notes that images of historical and legendary people carved into the choir's woodwork "reflect the intended seating during a Chapel ceremony". Images of figures connected to music are carved into the front (west), where the choir would sit, and images of scholars are carved into the back (east), where faculty would sit. Behind the altar are carved images of eight religious figures: four Catholic saints to the north, and four leaders of Protestantism to the south. The epic windows reinforce the idea of a "Catholic north" and a "Protestant south": Catholics wrote the north epics and Protestants the south epics. In an ecumenical touch, the north and south are symbolically united by "The Love of Christ" in the Great East Window.

Stained glass windows telling the story of the Book of Job are set into the walls of the staircases between the narthex and the gallery. Friend was known for delivering popular lectures on Job, and Milliner speculates that Friend had these windows included to address the problem of evil. Connick designed the windows in consultation with Friend, but they were made by others after the former's death.

The chapel's iconography pays tribute in places to the other Abrahamic religions. Abraham himself is depicted in a stained glass window on the north side of the nave, together with a Star of David, a Christian cross, and a star and crescent. Other windows show Baruch Spinoza and Muhammad ibn Zakariya al-Razi; both images were planned before the chapel was built.

In several places the chapel's iconography includes images of figures associated with Princeton University:

- Jonathan Edwards, Princeton's third president: in the Theology window in the nave's south wall and again among the Protestant leaders carved into the woodwork in the choir behind the altar.
- Joseph Henry, a professor and Trustee of Princeton: in the Science window in the nave's south wall.
- James Madison, a 1771 graduate of Princeton and its first graduate student: in the Law window in the nave's south wall.
- Adlai Stevenson II, a 1922 graduate of Princeton: in a dedicated stained glass window near the vestry.
- John Witherspoon, Princeton's sixth president: in the Great South Window, among the Christian teachers.

== Current use ==
The chapel operates within university's Office of Religious Life. It is overseen by the dean of the chapel. The current dean of the chapel is Theresa S. Thames, who is also dean of religious life at Princeton.

The Office of Religious Life calls the chapel "the home of regular religious services for many of the university's faith groups, including the 264-year-old ecumenical Christian worshiping community [...] that founded Princeton in 1746." Though the university was once closely associated with the Presbyterian Church, it has never been affiliated with any religious denomination. In keeping with this tradition, the chapel hosts ecumenical Christian services each Sunday. Catholic Mass is celebrated daily, Reconciliation is offered several days a week, and there is Eucharistic Adoration twice weekly.

The chapel also hosts several annual special events.

- Opening Exercises: The ceremony marking the beginning of the university's academic year has been held in the chapel since 1929.
- Service of Remembrance: On Alumni Day, the chapel hosts a service remembering members of the Princeton University community who died during the preceding calendar year.
- Westminster Choir College: The nearby conservatory holds many major performances and ceremonies each year in the chapel. These events include the annual Evening of Readings and Carols in December and the Westminster commencement ceremonies in May.
- Baccalaureate: Princeton University's graduating senior class attends an interfaith baccalaureate service in the chapel on the Sunday prior to Commencement.

The Princeton University Chapel Choir rehearses, provides music for the weekly service, and performs occasional concerts in the chapel.

== Works cited ==
- Bush, Sara E.; Kemeny, P. C. (1999). "The Princeton University chapels: an architectural and religious history" (PDF). The Princeton University Library Chronicle. Vol. 60, no. 3. pp. 317–52.
- Milliner, Matthew J. (Spring 2009). "Primus inter pares: Albert M. Friend and the argument of the Princeton University Chapel". The Princeton University Library Chronicle. Vol. 70, no. 3. pp. 470–517.
- Milliner, Matthew J. (2007). "The Princeton University Chapel". Pamphlet. The Educational Technologies Center of Princeton University. Hypertext; PDF.
- Rhinehart, Raymond (2000). "University Chapel". Princeton University: An Architectural Tour. New York, N.Y.: Princeton Architectural Press. pp. 49–53.
- Stillwell, Richard (1971). The Chapel of Princeton University. Princeton, N.J.: Princeton University Press.
