= Princeton University Chapel Choir =

The Princeton University Chapel Choir, composed of approximately 60 Princeton undergraduate students, graduate students, and faculty members, sings at Sunday morning services and official university functions in the Princeton University Chapel, as well as performing their own concerts every semester. It is arguably the oldest choir on campus, although it is now very different from its original form. It is the only singing group on campus whose members are paid. The choir has been conducted by Dr. Nicole Aldrich since 2021 and has performed internationally, including tours to Prague, Italy, and Spain.

== History ==
When John Adams visited Princeton in 1774, he wrote in his diary that he "went into the Chappell, the President soon came in, and we attended. The Schollars sing as badly as the Presbyterians at New York." At this time, students were required to attend morning and evening prayers before every day before classes, and morning and afternoon services on Sunday. Over the years, the attendance requirements slackened: by 1915, attendance at weekday services was no longer mandatory, and in 1964 even attendance on Sundays was no longer a requirement. But the choir continued as an integral part of the Sunday services and evolved dramatically. Originally a male chorus that sang only sacred music, mostly Renaissance and Baroque, it is now a mixed choir with a vast repertoire, including sacred works from all eras and pieces from non-Christian religious traditions.

From 1958 to 1992, the choir was led by Walter L. Nollner. From 1992 to 2021, it was directed by Penna Rose. The choir is often accompanied by the University Organist, Eric Plutz.

== Role on campus ==
In addition to Sunday morning services, the Princeton University Chapel Choir sings at official university functions, including Opening Exercises for the freshman class, the Service of Remembrance for alumni, and Baccalaureate for the graduating seniors. They also sing at various other services held by the Office of Religious Life, including a yearly interfaith peace service monthly jazz vespers. Every Advent season, they organize a Messiah sing for the community.

== Repertoire ==
In recent years the choir has performed pieces by traditional composers such as Bach, Mozart, Tchaikovsky, and Rachmaninoff, as well as modern works by Bob Chilcott, Ola Gjeilo, Eric Whitacre, James Whitbourn, and Bobby McFerrin.
