= Silversmith Hotel =

Hotel in Chicago, Illinois

- U.S. National Register of Historic Places
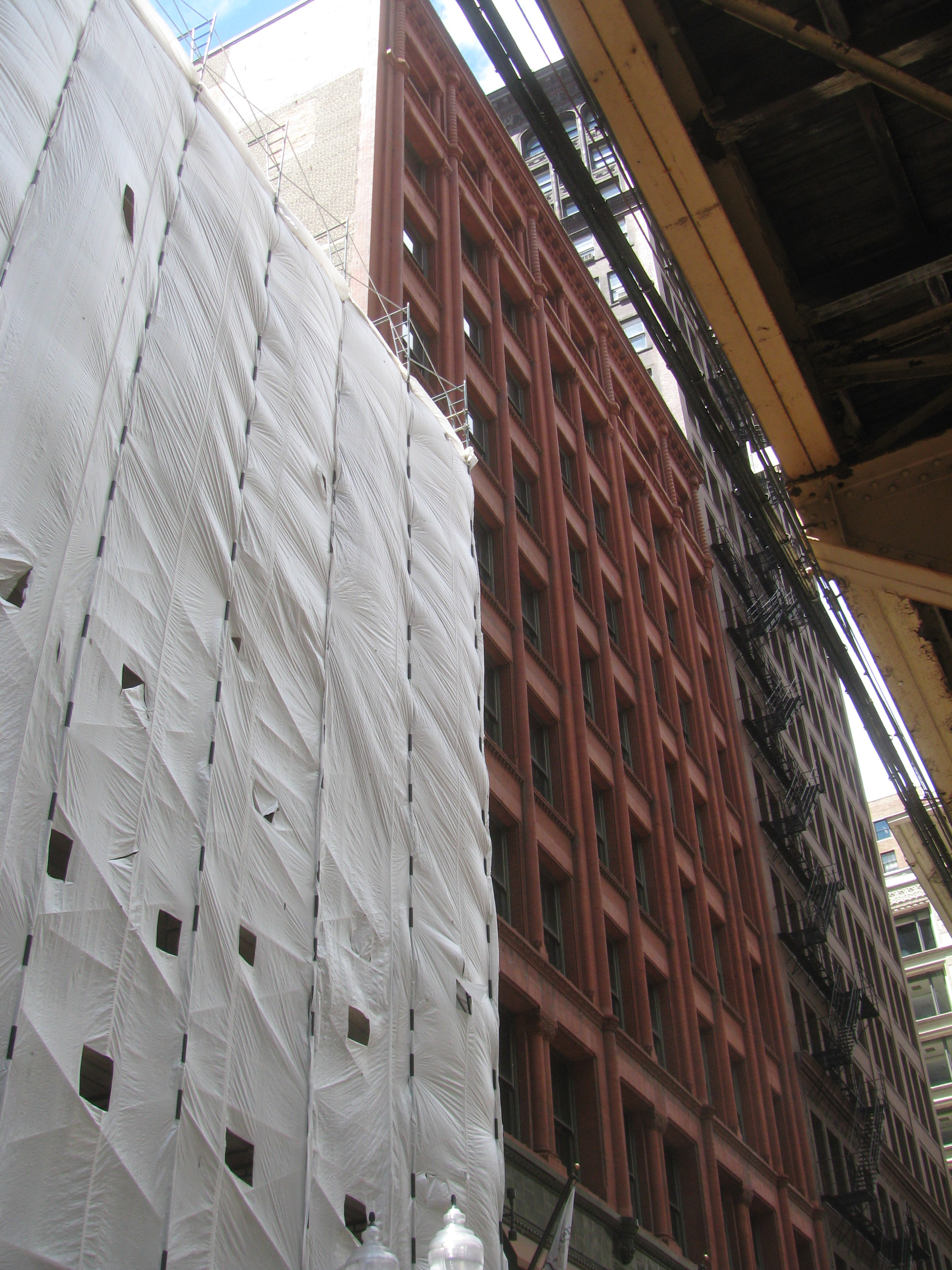
- The Silversmith Building

- Location within Chicago metropolitan area Location within Illinois Location within the United States
- Location: 10 S. Wabash Ave., Chicago, Illinois
- Coordinates: 41°52′52″N 87°37′35″W
- Area: 0.3 acres (0.12 ha)
- Built: 1897
- Architect: Weber, Peter J.
- Architectural style: Chicago school
- NRHP reference No.: 97000435
- Added to NRHP: May 16, 1997

The Silversmith Hotel is a boutique hotel located in downtown Chicago, Illinois. It occupies the historic Silversmith Building, designed in 1896 by Peter J. Weber of the architectural firm of D.H. Burnham and Company, who also designed the Fisher Building. The building's architecture reflects the transition from Romanesque Revival architecture to Chicago school architecture. The Silversmith Building was listed on the National Register of Historic Places in 1997.

It became a member of the National Registry of the Historic Hotels of America in 2016.

== See also ==
- National Register of Historic Places listings in Chicago
