= The National, Chicago =

Building in Chicago

The National
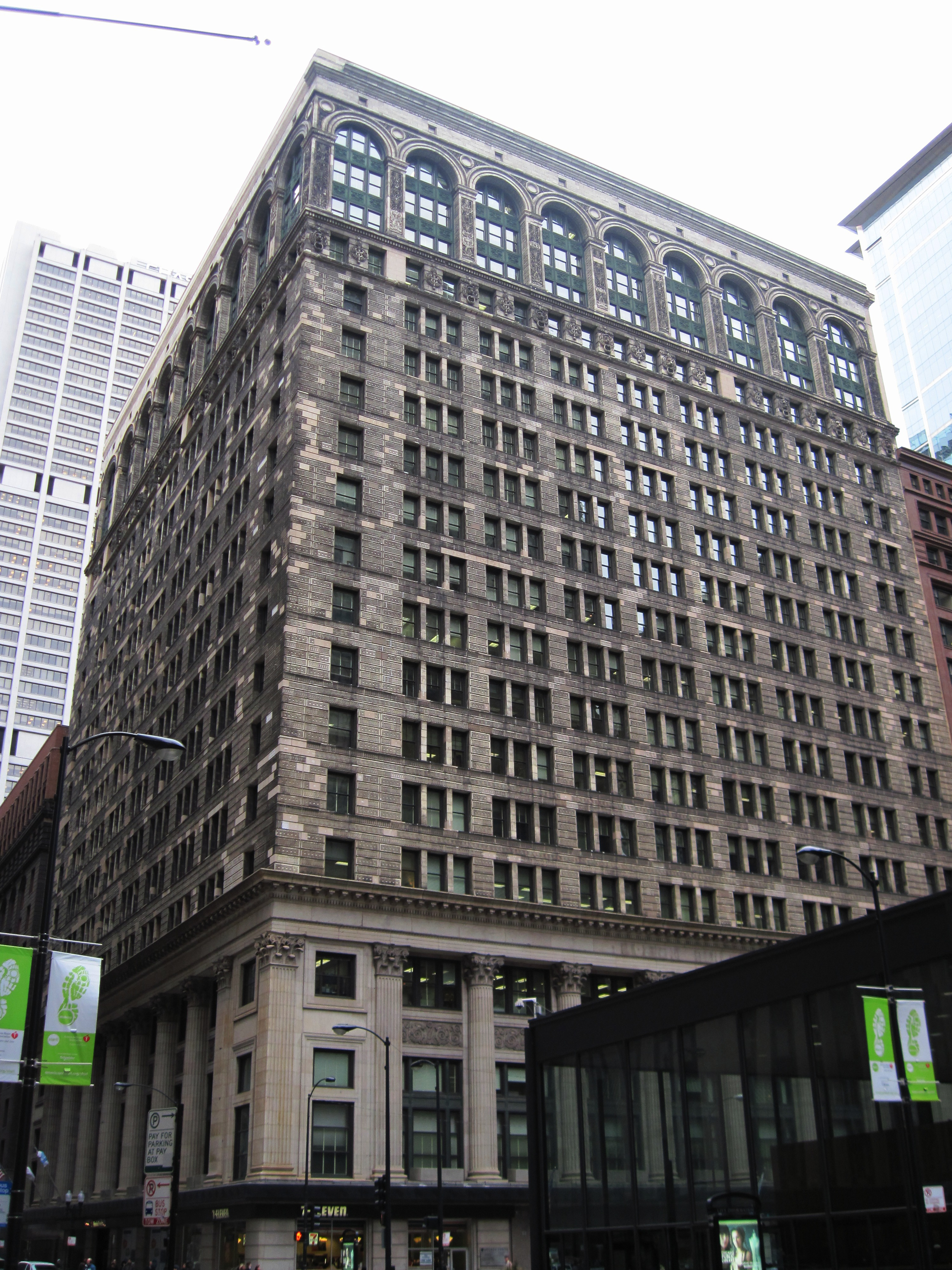
- 125 S. Clark on March 25, 2010

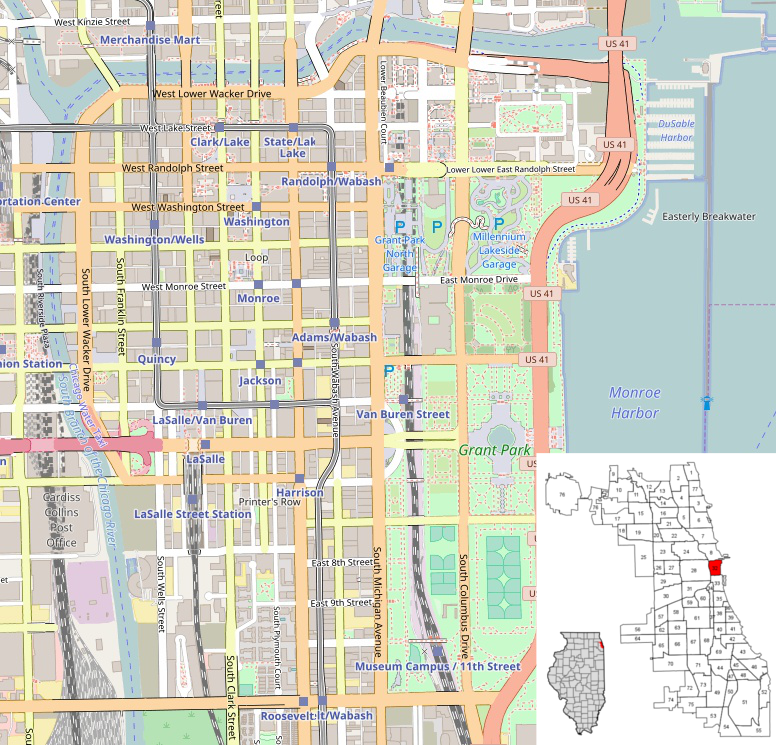
- Location within Chicago Loop

General information
- Location: Chicago Loop, 125 S. Clark, Chicago, Illinois, United States
- Coordinates: 41.879797°N 87.630548°W
- Construction started: 1906
- Completed: 1907
- Landlord: Bluestar Properties

Height
- Architectural: 92.4 m (303 ft)
- Tip: 114 m (374 ft)

Technical details
- Floor count: 20
- Floor area: 580,000 square feet (54,000 m^{2})

Design and construction
- Architect: D. H. Burnham & Company

Website
- thenationalchicago.com

The National is a landmark high-rise building in the Chicago Loop and originally named the Commercial National Bank Building.

== History ==
The building was designed by D. H. Burnham & Company, and is the oldest surviving building in the Loop designed by that firm. It was designed for the Commercial National Bank, which had been formed after the passage of the National Banking Act of 1863. It was constructed between 1906 and 1907.

The Commercial National Bank merged with the Continental National Bank in 1910; the merged entity moved into the Continental and Commercial National Bank building in 1914. The building was renamed the "Edison Building" in 1912 and served as the headquarters of Commonwealth Edison until 1969.

The Commercial National Bank Building was designated a Chicago Landmark on June 22, 2016.

== Height ==
The building has an estimated height of 231.82 ft.

== See also ==
- List of tallest buildings in Chicago
- List of tallest buildings in the United States
- Marquette Building (Chicago)

== Works cited ==
- Commission on Chicago Landmarks (April 7, 2016). Commercial National Bank Building (PDF). City of Chicago.
