= Continental and Commercial National Bank =

- U.S. National Register of Historic Places
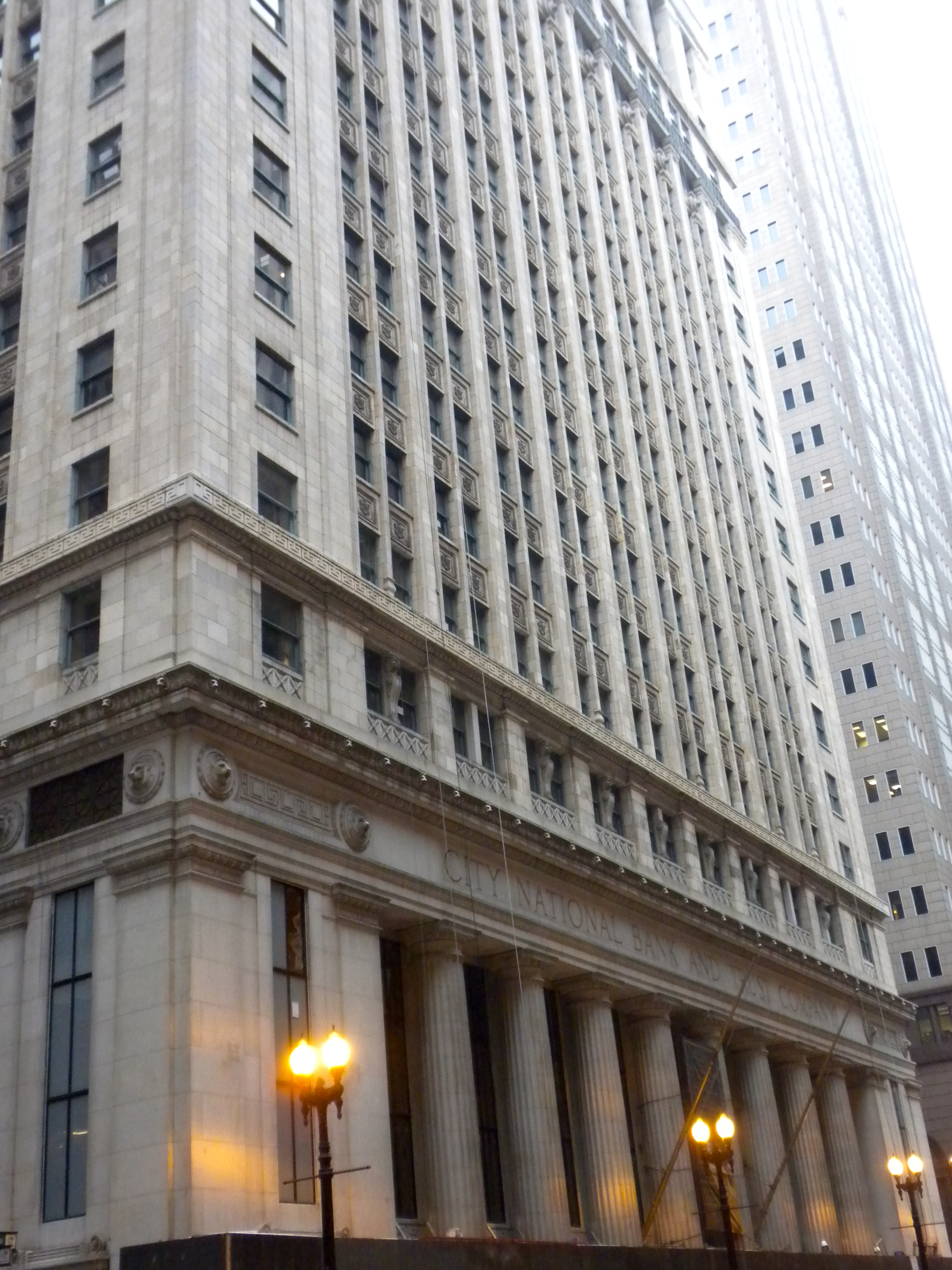

- Location within Illinois Location within the United States
- Location: 208 S. LaSalle St., Chicago, Illinois
- Coordinates: 41°52′45″N 87°37′56″W
- Area: less than one acre
- Built: 1911-14
- Built by: Graham, Anderson, Probst and White
- Architect: D.H. Burnham and Company
- Architectural style: Classical Revival
- NRHP reference No.: 07000064
- Added to NRHP: February 14, 2007

The Continental and Commercial National Bank is a historic office building located at 208 S. LaSalle Street in Chicago's Loop. The 21-story building was built in 1911–1914 for the Continental and Commercial National Bank, at the time one of the largest banks in the nation. Architect Daniel Burnham designed the building in the Classical Revival style; Burnham, who was perhaps best known for his 1909 plan of Chicago, was a proponent of the style and used it in office buildings in multiple cities. The building's main entrance features a three-story colonnade with eight Doric columns; the eighteenth through the twentieth floors feature a matching colonnade, which forms the building's capital. A frieze and belt course separate the fourth and seventeenth floors from the shaft of the building, giving the building a small amount of horizontal emphasis. An open court occupies the center of the building, allowing natural light to reach its interior offices.

The building was added to the National Register of Historic Places on February 14, 2007.

The JW Marriott Chicago opened on the building’s first 12 floors in 2010. The LaSalle Chicago hotel opened in the building in 2022.

Prior to merging with the Continental National Bank to form the Continental and Commercial Nation Bank, the Commercial National Bank was previously located in the now landmark Commercial National Bank Building.
