= Drexel and Company Building =

- U.S. National Register of Historic Places
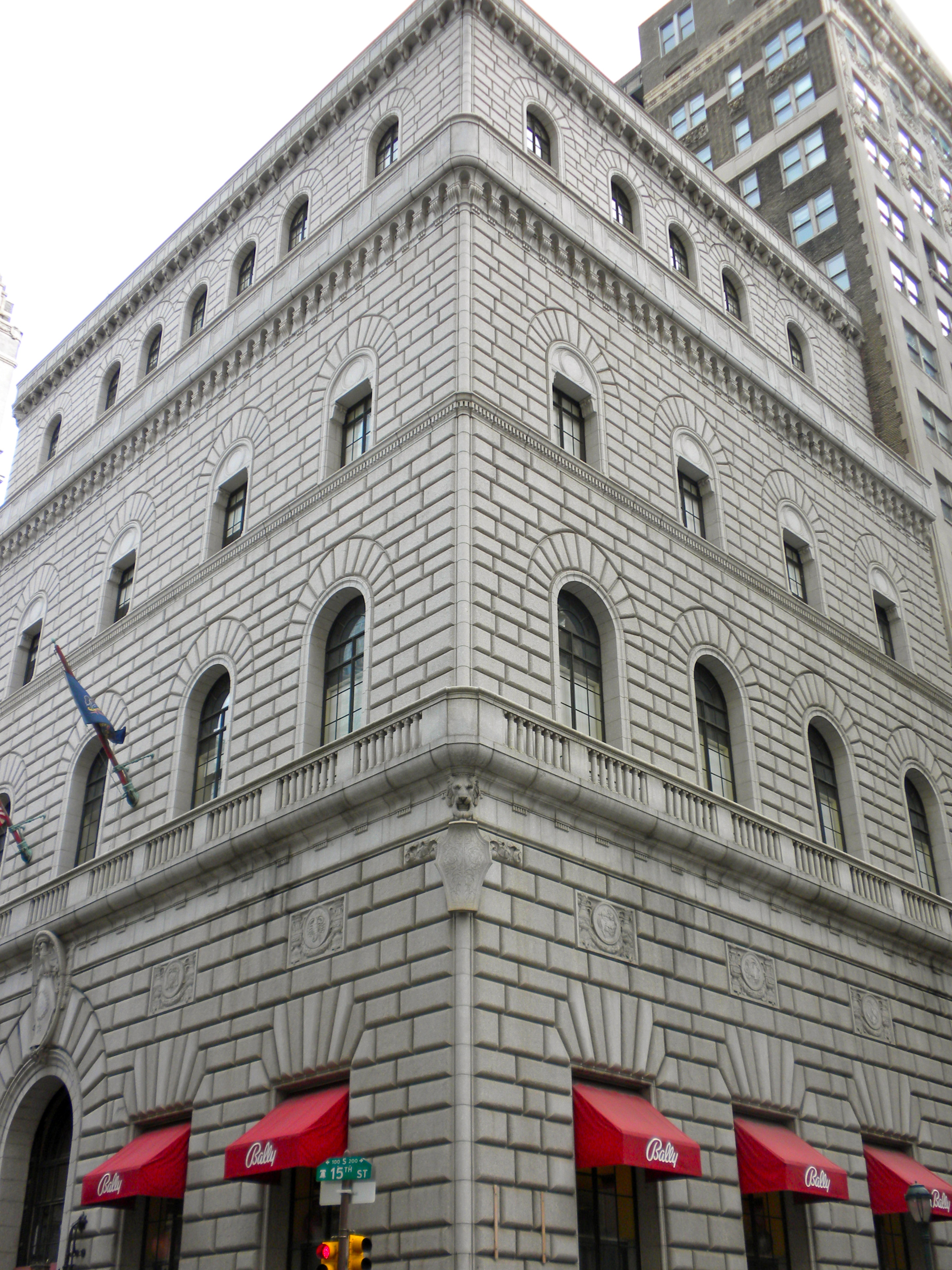
- Drexel Building, February 2010

- Location within Philadelphia Location within Pennsylvania Location within the United States
- Location: 135–143 S. 15th St., Philadelphia, Pennsylvania
- Coordinates: 39°56′58″N 75°9′58″W
- Area: 0.3 acres (0.12 ha)
- Built: 1925–1927
- Built by: Doyle & Co.
- Architect: Day & Klauder
- Architectural style: Late 19th And 20th Century Revivals, Renaissance Palazzo
- NRHP reference No.: 80003610
- Added to NRHP: February 8, 1980

Drexel and Company Building, also known as the Drexel Building, is a historic bank building located in the Rittenhouse Square East neighborhood of Philadelphia, Pennsylvania. It was built between 1925 and 1927, and is a six-story, building with basement and penthouse in a Renaissance Palazzo style. It is faced in ashlar granite and features a rounded entrance portal, low relief zodiac roundels, carved shields, and wrought iron lamps. It was built as headquarters for Drexel and Company, which was subsequently dissolved in the 1930s. It was then occupied by a local bank.

It was added to the National Register of Historic Places in 1980.
