= D. H. Burnham & Company =

Architecture firm based in Chicago, Illinois

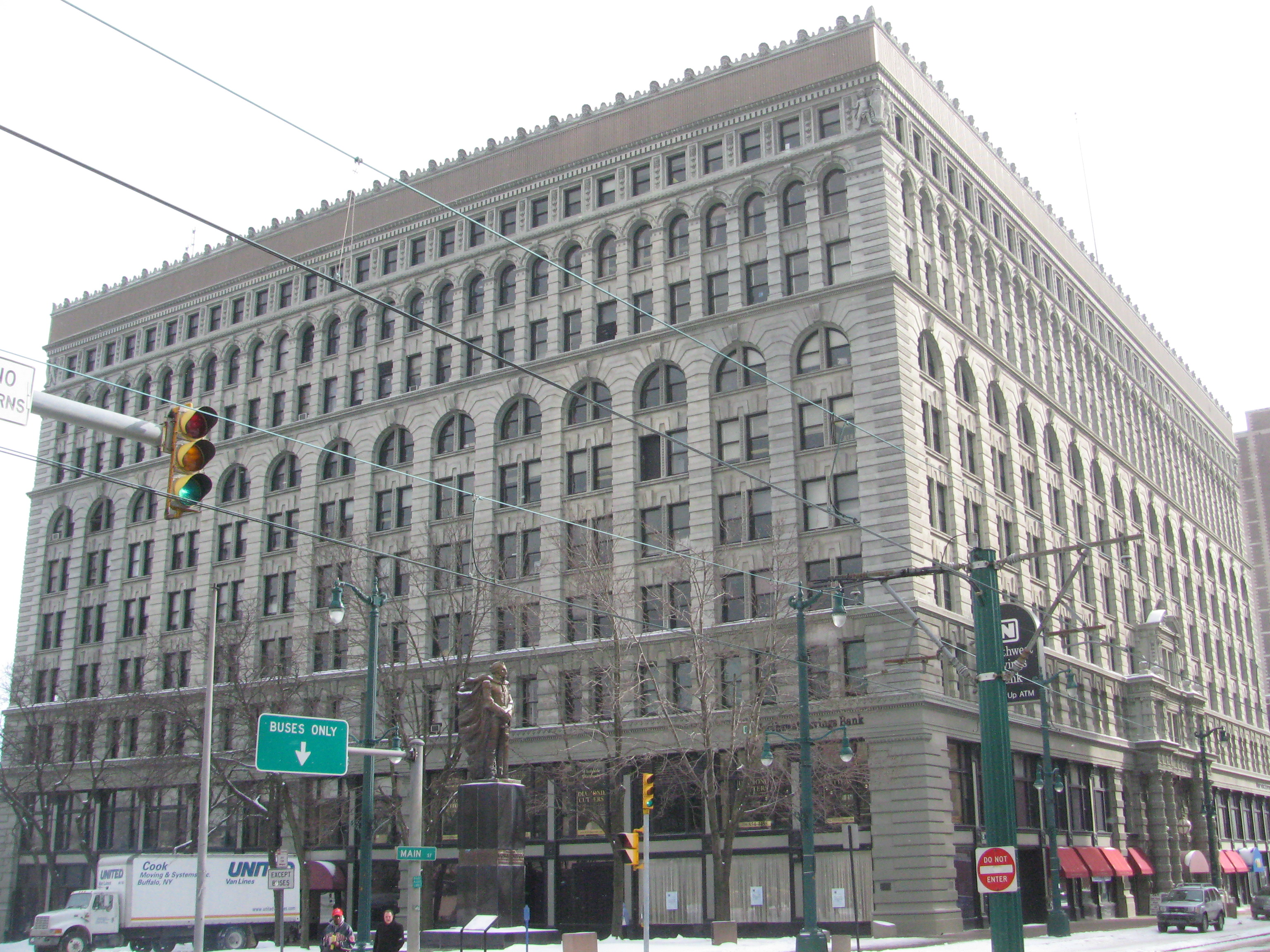
Ellicott Square Building, Buffalo, New York, 1896

D.H. Burnham and Company was an architecture firm based in Chicago, Illinois. As successor to Burnham and Root, the name was changed once John Root died in 1891. Root was the chief consulting architect for the World's Columbian Exposition. After Root's death, Daniel Burnham took that title along with his old title of Chief of Construction.

== History ==
D.H. Burnham and Company continued to have design output that was prodigious. Works include the Ellicott Square Building in Buffalo, New York, overseeing the reconstruction and expansion of the Marshall Field and Company Building in Chicago between 1893 and 1914, designing and building The Silversmith Building, now The Silversmith Hotel & Suites in downtown Chicago in the late 1890s, Pennsylvania Station in Pittsburgh (1903), Union Depot in El Paso (1906), Union Station in Washington, D.C. (1907), and the Commercial National Bank Building in Chicago (1907).

In 1894 Burnham was the President of the American Institute of Architects and was asked to draw up plans for cities such as San Francisco, Cleveland, and Baltimore.

== Burnham Plan ==
The Burnham Plan was a basis plan for the city of Chicago. The plan kept forest preserves along and near the city's lakeside, to ensure its preservation in case of a population explosion.

When Burnham died in 1912 the company was passed down to a longtime trusted employee, who later changed the name to Graham, Burnham and Company.

== See also ==
- Chicago school (architecture)

== Other sources ==
- Hines, Thomas S. (2008) Burnham of Chicago: Architect and Planner (University of Chicago Press) ISBN 9780226341729
- Smith, Carl (2006) The Plan of Chicago: Daniel Burnham and the Remaking of the American City (University of Chicago Press) ISBN 0-226-76471-0
