= The Investment Building =

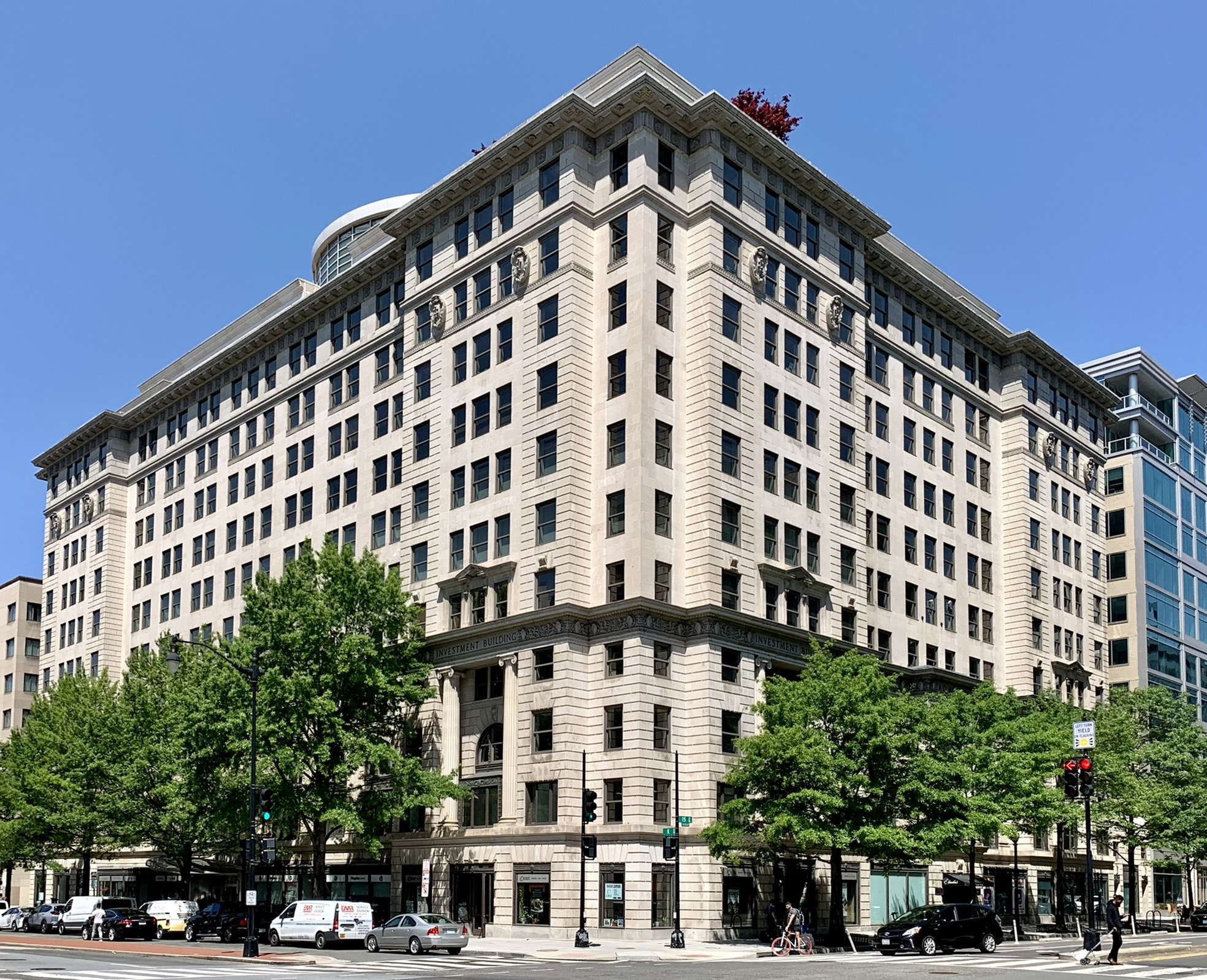
- The Investment Building in 2022
- Interactive map of the The Investment Building area

General information
- Type: Office
- Location: 1501 K Street NW, Washington, D.C., United States
- Coordinates: 38.9028°N 77.0352°W
- Completed: 2001
- Opening: 2001

Height
- Roof: 154 ft (47 m)

Technical details
- Floor count: 13

Design and construction
- Architects: César Pelli, Shalom Baranes Associates
- Developer: The Kaempfer Company, Clark Construction Group

The Investment Building is a high-rise office building in Washington, D.C. The building rises 13 floors and 154 feet (47 m) in height. The interior renovation and redesign of the building was by architect César Pelli; Pelli also designed the Petronas Twin Towers in Kuala Lumpur. The renovation was completed in 2001. As of July 2008, the structure stands as the 32nd-tallest building in the city, tied in rank with 1310 G Street, 1430 K Street, 1875 K Street, the Westin Washington, D.C. City Center, the Executive Tower, 1701 Pennsylvania Avenue the Capital Hilton and The Westin Washington, D.C. City Center. The building is composed entirely of commercial office space.

The Investment Building is partially composed of elements from an older building of the same name that was designed in 1910 by Jules Henri de Sibour, and completed in 1924; the building was partially demolished, but its historic facade was preserved. The modern Investment Building rises two floors higher than its predecessor.

The building is principally occupied by Sidley Austin, the sixth largest law firm in the United States; and by the Washington office of UBS. Its ground floor houses The Catholic Information Center, a Catholic bookstore.

== See also ==
- List of tallest buildings in Washington, D.C.
- The site was formerly the location of the Warder Mansion, which was moved to Columbia Heights.
