= 1099 14th Street =

1099 14th Street NW
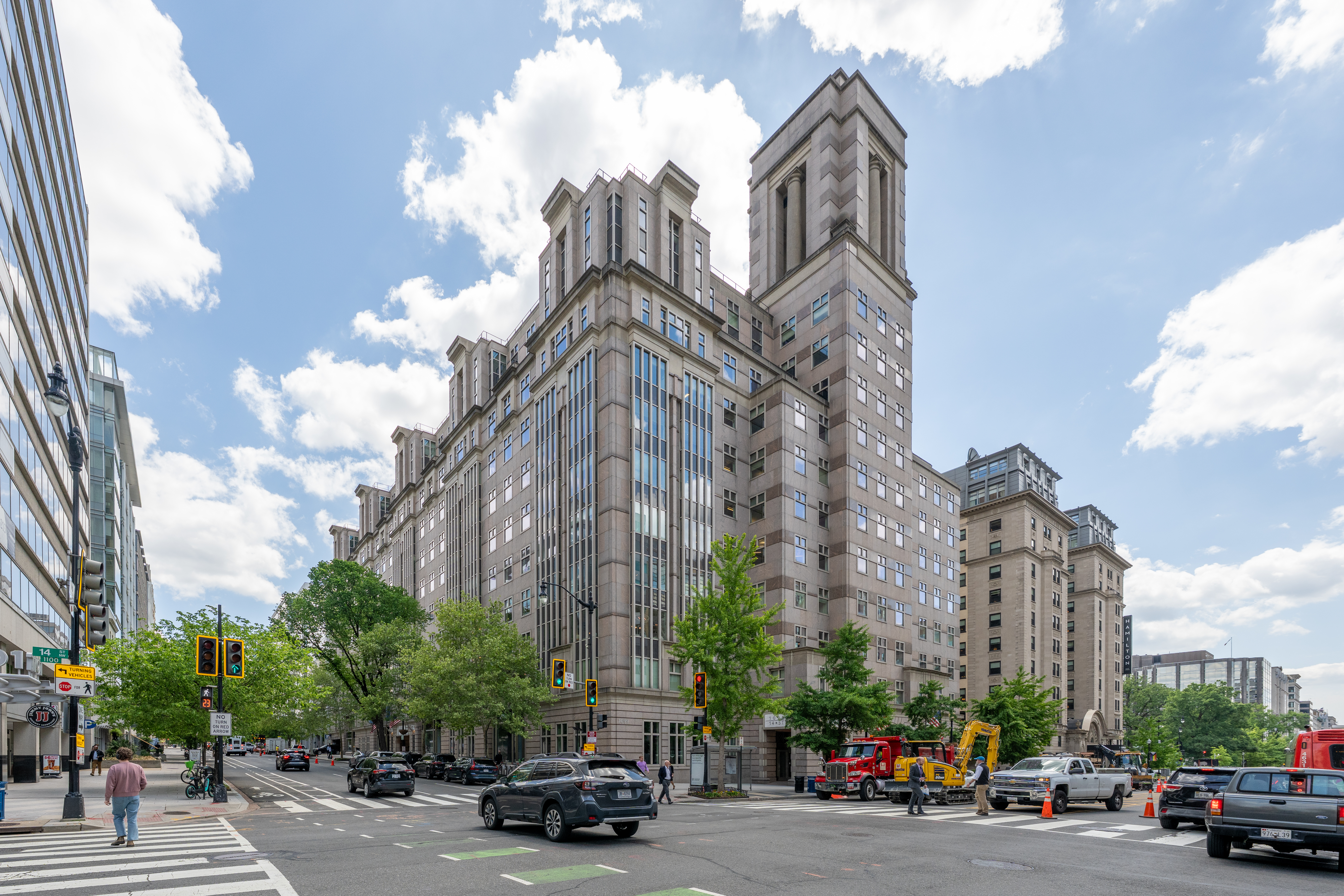
- 1099 14th Street NW (also known as Franklin Court) in 2026

General information
- Type: Office
- Location: Washington, D.C., United States
- Coordinates: 38.903441°N 77.031719°W
- Completed: 1992
- Operator: Lincoln Property Company

Height
- Roof: 155.60 feet (47.43 m)

Technical details
- Floor count: 15
- Floor area: 450,000 square feet (42,000 m^{2})

Design and construction
- Architects: Arthur May, Kohn Pedersen Fox
- Developer: Chubb Realty, Evans Partnership, and Australian Capital Equity

1099 14th Street NW, also known as Franklin Court, is a high-rise Postmodern office building located in Washington, D.C., in the United States. Constructed in 1992 as part of the redevelopment of the Franklin Square area from a red-light district to an area of office buildings, it is a Class A office building with 11 stories aboveground, four below, and a mezzanine. Its tower, when built, was the highest in the city.

== History of the site ==
After the American Civil War, 14th Street NW became a fashionable residential district. By the 1930s, numerous retail shops and trendy nightclubs ringed Franklin Square and lined 14th Street. In the 1950s, 14th Street NW between H Street NW and Thomas Circle was a high-class entertainment district. A large number of nightclubs lined the street, and some of the top entertainers in the nation performed in them.

Beginning in the 1960s, adult bookstores and peep shows began appearing along the street. The 1968 Martin Luther King, Jr. riots caused many businesses to flee the area. By the 1970s, encouraged by city zoning laws, 14th Street had become a red-light district 10 blocks long. Prostitution and the illegal drug trade (including the overt sale and use of illegal drugs) was common along the street. Known as "the Strip", this red-light district was nationally known and the very large number of prostitutes was something of a tourist attraction. Among the more notable establishments along the Strip were Adam & Eve, Benny's Home of the Porno Stars, The Butterfly, Californian Steak House, Casino Royal, The Cocoon, This Is It?, and the Pink Pussy. Numerous barkers stood in the street, soliciting business for the adult businesses. A large number of lounges and tourist homes also existed along the Strip, and prostitutes (male and female; gendered, transvestite, and transgender; straight and gay) used these locations for prostitution.

Between 1978 and 1985, real estate developers (driven by the scarcity of low-cost real estate in the city) slowly began buying up and closing some of the adult businesses along the Strip. About the same time, the Franklin Square Association – a group of building owners and investors with financial interests in the area – hired private investigators to record examples of liquor and zoning code violations. The association's activities led to the arrest of many adult club owners and the closure of their businesses.

In 1986, developers began tearing down many of the small, dilapidated structures along the Strip and started erecting tall, modern office buildings. In the spring of 1987, the city began the largest crackdown on prostitution on the Strip since 1980. Crime fell rapidly. By January 1988, there was 5,000,000 square feet (460,000 m^{2}) of new and renovated office space along 14th Street NW and around Franklin Square, with another 2,000,000 square feet (190,000 m^{2}) of space worth $400 million opening by 1990.

The late 1980s saw a number of high-rise office buildings finished on 14th Street NW between I Street NW and Thomas Circle. These included 1400 I Street NW (erected by Manufacturers Real Estate) and 1313 K Street NW (now known as One Franklin Square). But according to a map printed by Washington Post, no new building was planned to replace the five-story, dilapidated commercial building on the east side of 14th Street between K and L Streets NW.

By April 1989, the commercial buildings were being demolished, and a parking lot occupied the remainder of the site. There were four pieces of property which constituted the future site of 1099 14th Street NW. The four parcels owned by Howard Flax and Ronald Cohen. Cohen was the principal owner of Ronald Cohen Investments (a real estate investment and management firm located in Bethesda, Maryland). Flax was an associate with the firm. Cohen and Flax had intended to develop the four sites themselves. But a rapid rise in land prices along 14th Street led them to sell the property and build elsewhere.

== Construction ==
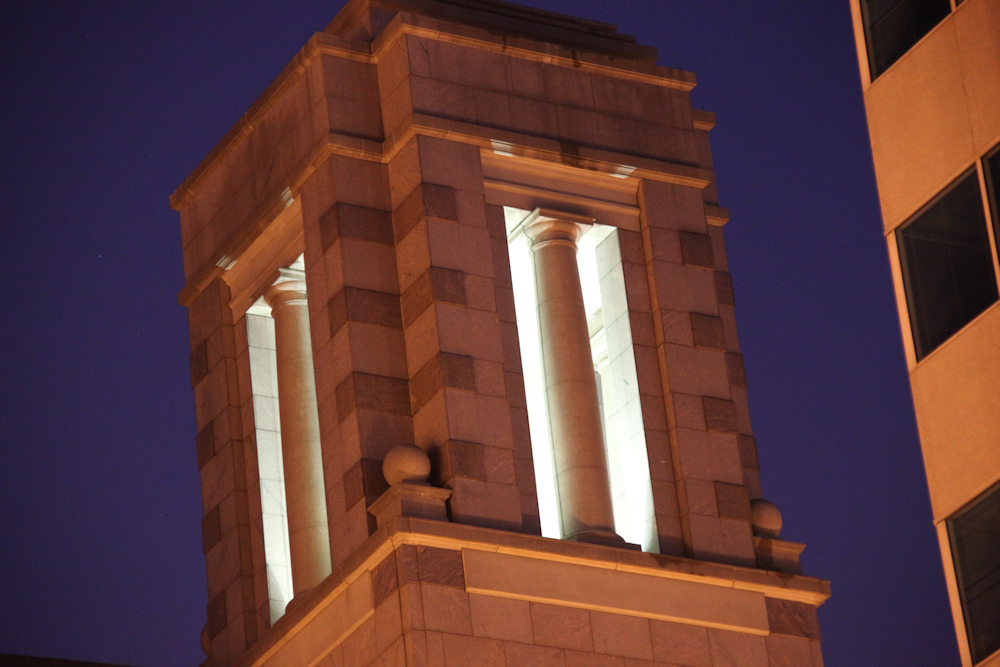
Tower of 1099 14th Street NW, lit from within at night in 2010.

Between March 1988 and January 1989, a holding company known as 1330 L Street Associates L.P. purchased the four smaller plots of land on the southwest corner of the intersection of L and 14th Streets NW and merged them into a single large parcel. The cost of the four plots totaled $40.3 million.

In April 1989, Chubb Realty paid $64 million for the 1 acre (4,000 m^{2}) site. (The Washington Post listed the size of the plot at 42,808 square feet (3,977.0 m^{2}).) It was a record price for a parcel of land in downtown Washington, D.C. The Evans Partnership, a real estate investment firm formed by fashion entrepreneur Charles Evans and his brother-in-law, Michael Shure, was the new owner of the lot, while Chubb Realty provided the financing. Crimson Services, a property acquisition consultant, acted as go-between for Evans Partnership and 1330 L Street Associates.

Evans Partnership said it intended to build an 11-story, 460,000 square feet (43,000 m^{2}) office building. It hired architect Arthur May of the firm of Kohn Pedersen Fox to design the structure.

Construction on 1099 14th Street NW began in March 1990. The Washington Post reported that the $200 million building would contain only 450,000 square feet (42,000 m^{2}) of interior space. A completion date of late 1991 was planned. In April 1990, Australian Capital Equity (an investment holding company owned by Australian businessman Kerry Stokes) purchased a 25 percent ownership equity in the structure. Chubb Realty continued to hold a majority ownership stake, and Evans Partnership retained its minority interest as well. The structure was on track for a fall 1991 opening in December 1990. However, the building was completed in 1992.

== About the building ==
As of 2012, the 11 story Postmodern building had 450,000 square feet (42,000 m^{2}) of interior space, of which 340,502 square feet (31,633.7 m^{2}) was leasable. Emporis (which includes a mezzanine as one of the building's floors) notes that the structure has four floors belowground, and lists the building's height as 155.60 feet (47.43 m). The interior floors and walls are clad in granite and marble, and all the common-area lighting fixtures are of bronze.

1099 14th Street is in the Postmodern architectural style. The building contains two notable features: Its tower and its lobby. The tower, reported to be the highest yet built in the city, is a Neoclassical, open-air temple-like structure with a column set in each side. Washington Post architecture critic Benjamin Forgey called it "Tuscan" in style. The lobby runs the length of the building along an east-west axis. Its ceiling is a catenary arch clad in flame maple. The floor of the lobby is tricolor marble arranged in a geometric pattern. At its midpoint, the lobby is pierced by a multi-story atrium lit with skylights. This atrium pieces below-ground, giving occupants and visitors access to an underground retail arcade.

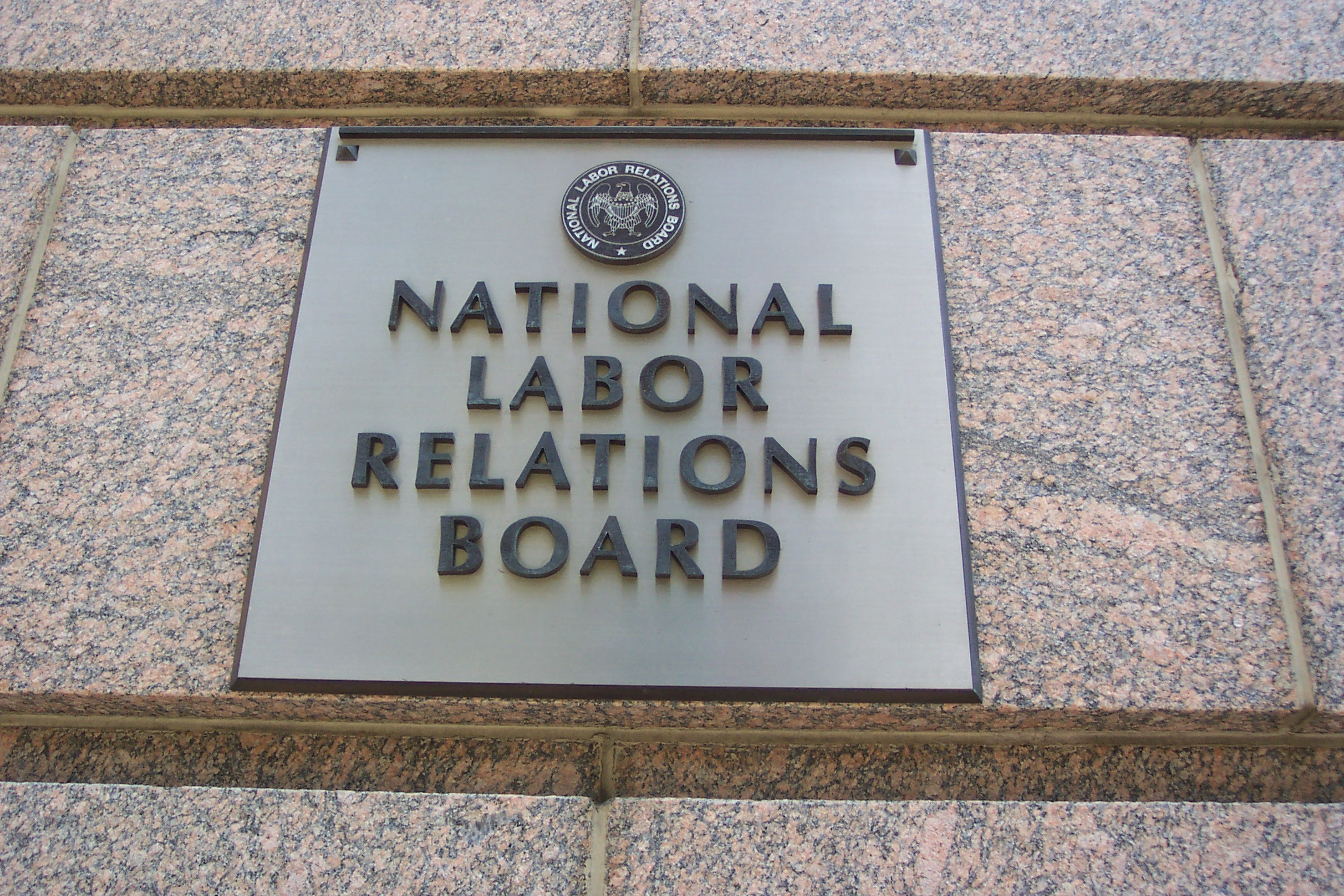
National Labor Relations Board sign on the 14th Street NW entrance of 1099 14th Street NW.

In 1993, the National Labor Relations Board signed a five-year lease (with options to renew for three additional five-year terms) for 62 percent of the building. The Environmental Protection Agency also took space in the building.

As of 1997, the structure was reported to have only 443,000 square feet (41,200 m^{2}) of interior space. That year, Chubb Realty sold its majority interest in the structure to a joint venture created by Paine Webber Real Estate Securities and Morgan Stanley Real Estate Fund II. The building's sale prices was not reported, but the total transaction (which included a number of other office and residential buildings in the D.C. metropolitan area) was $649 million in cash and the assumption of $109 million in debt.

In 1999, the building was sold again — this time to Lend Lease Real Estate Investment. The company purchased the building (now said to have just 440,000 square feet (41,000 m^{2}) of interior space) for $115 million (somewhat on the low end of recent prices for Class A office space).

The building was still considered a "trophy class" office building in 2010, and the General Services Administration was in the process of negotiating a new long-term lease for the federal tenants at 1099 14th Street NW.

Beginning in 2010, 1099 14th Street was managed by Lincoln Property Company.

In May 2013, the Washington Design Center moved into the building after losing its long-time home in southwest Washington. At least 15 high-end interior design firms moved into the structure, and more were expected to follow. In late summer 2015, the NLRB left the building for a new headquarters at 1015 Half Street SE. The Washington Post considered moving its headquarters to 1099 14th Street in 2014 and 2015, taking two floors in the building. But the building owners and the newspaper could not come to terms, and the Post moved to One Franklin Square instead.

== Critical reception ==
Washington Post architecture critic Benjamin Forgey called the tower at 1099 14th Street NW the "quirkiest" of the many towers downtown, and said it looked like an "improbabl[e]...cemetery ornament in the sky". Although his praise for the tower was equivocal, his admiration for the lobby was not. He called it "beautiful" and the "most elegant and most urbane" lobby in the city.

== See also ==
- List of tallest buildings in Washington, D.C.

== Bibliography ==
- Weatherford, J. McIver. Porn Row. New York: Arbor House, 1986.
