= 1625 Eye Street =

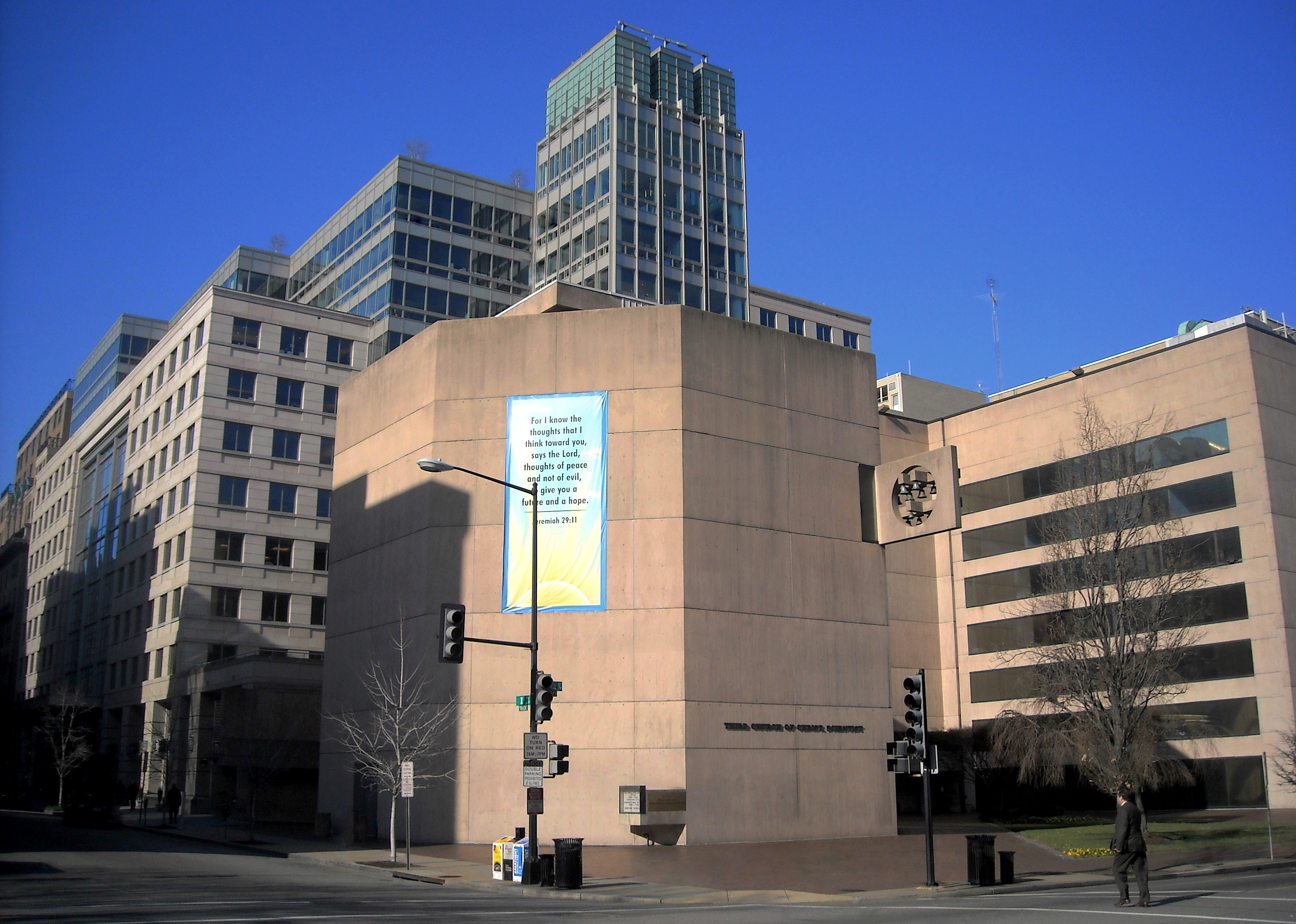
- 1625 Eye Street with the Third Church of Christ, Scientist in foreground
- Interactive map of the 1625 Eye Street area

General information
- Type: Office/Parking Garage
- Location: Washington, D.C., United States
- Coordinates: 38°54′5.6″N 77°02′15.3″W
- Construction started: 2001
- Completed: 2003

Height
- Roof: 160 feet (49 m)

Technical details
- Floor count: 12
- Lifts/elevators: 10

Design and construction
- Architects: Skidmore, Owings & Merrill (Washington)
- Developer: Union Labor Life Insurance Company

1625 Eye Street is a high-rise building located in Washington, D.C., United States. Its construction began in 2001 and was completed in 2003. The building rises to 160 feet (49 m), featuring 12 floors and 10 elevators to serve those 12 floors. The construction of this building replaced the Cafritz Building, which also used the same address as this building. The original architect of the building was Skidmore, Owings & Merrill (Washington), who designed the postmodern concept of the building. Gensler repositioned the design and ultimately completed the documentation, permitting and construction administration of the building. The material of the postmodern design includes steel and glass. The building serves as an office use building and as a parking garage. The building is operated by American Real Estate Partners. The building was originally operated and developed by Union Labor Life Insurance Company, though in late 2003, Skidmore, Owings, & Merrill (Washington) bought the operations to the building for $157 million.

The building's tenants include CQ Roll Call, Colliers International, the Consumer Healthcare Products Association, and O'Melveny & Myers.

== See also ==
- List of tallest buildings in Washington, D.C.
