= Capitol View =

Capitol View may refer to a location in the United States:

- Capitol View (Washington, D.C.), a neighborhood
- Capitol View (building), a building in Washington, D.C.
- Capitol View, Atlanta, Georgia, a neighborhood in Atlanta, Georgia
- Capitol View, South Carolina, a census-designated place
