= PNC Bank Building =

PNC Bank Building may refer to:

- PNC Bank Building (Columbus, Ohio)
- PNC Bank Building (Toledo, Ohio)
- PNC Bank Building (Philadelphia)
- PNC Bank Building (Washington, D.C.)
