= 700 Eleventh Street =

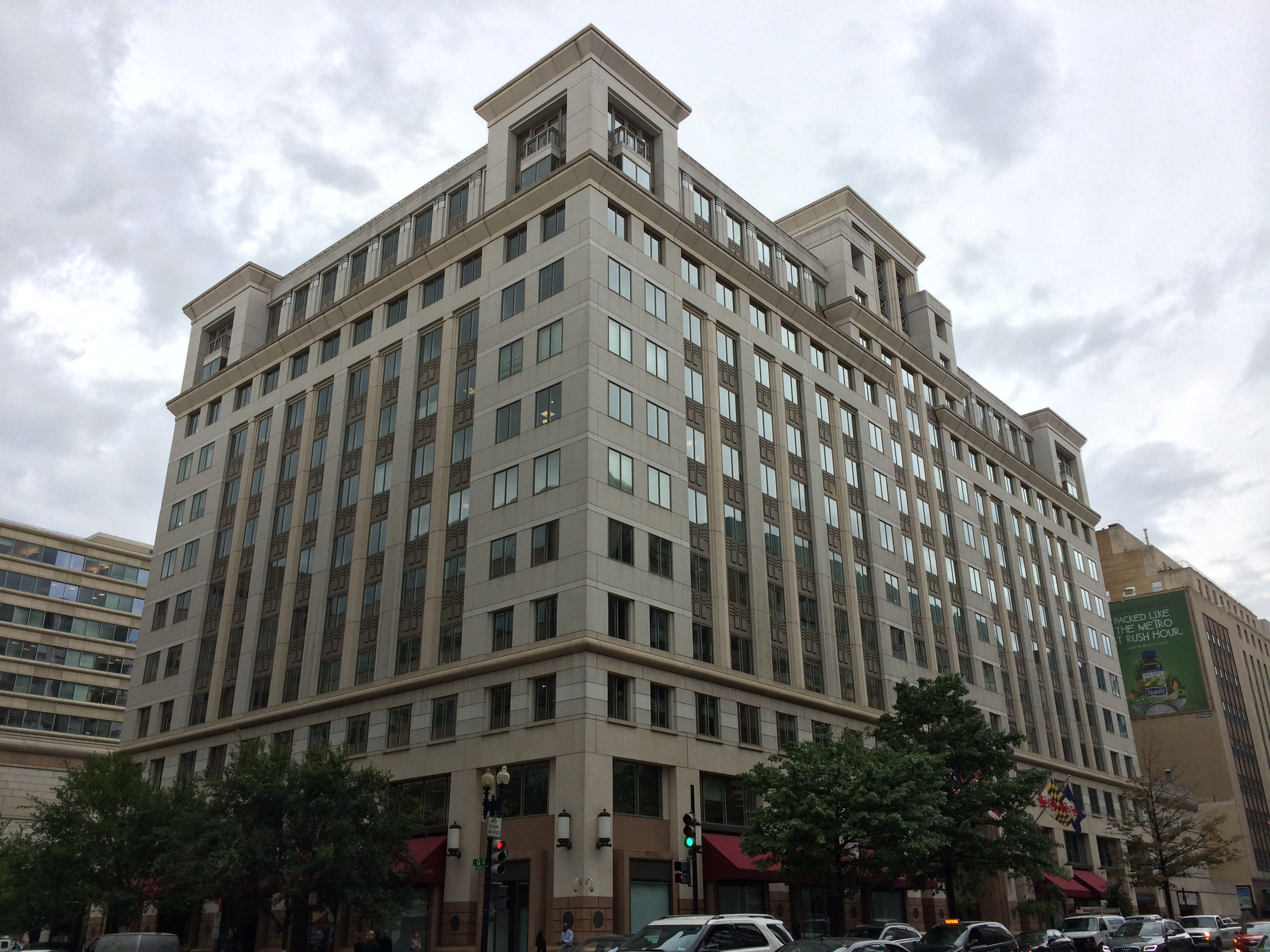
- Interactive map of the 700 Eleventh Street area

General information
- Status: Completed
- Type: Office
- Location: 700 11th Street NW, Washington DC, United States
- Coordinates: 38.8985°N 77.0273°W
- Completed: 1992

Technical details
- Floor count: 13

Design and construction
- Architect: David M. Childs

700 Eleventh Street is a high-rise building and is the second tallest office building in Washington, D.C. The building is a twin building to Metro Center I, which is one block away. The building stands at 199 feet (61 meters) with 13 floors and was completed in 1992. It is currently the 6th-tallest building in Washington, D.C. The architectural firm who designed the building was the firms Skidmore, Owings & Merrill (New York), Melvin Mitchell Architects.

In September 2023, it was announced that Madison Marquette was planning to redevelop the building from a purely office building into a live/work loft development, with 239 live/work loft developments. The concept is to have spaces that could be used for living, for work, or for both.

== See also ==
- List of tallest buildings in Washington, D.C.
