= The Pennsylvania North =

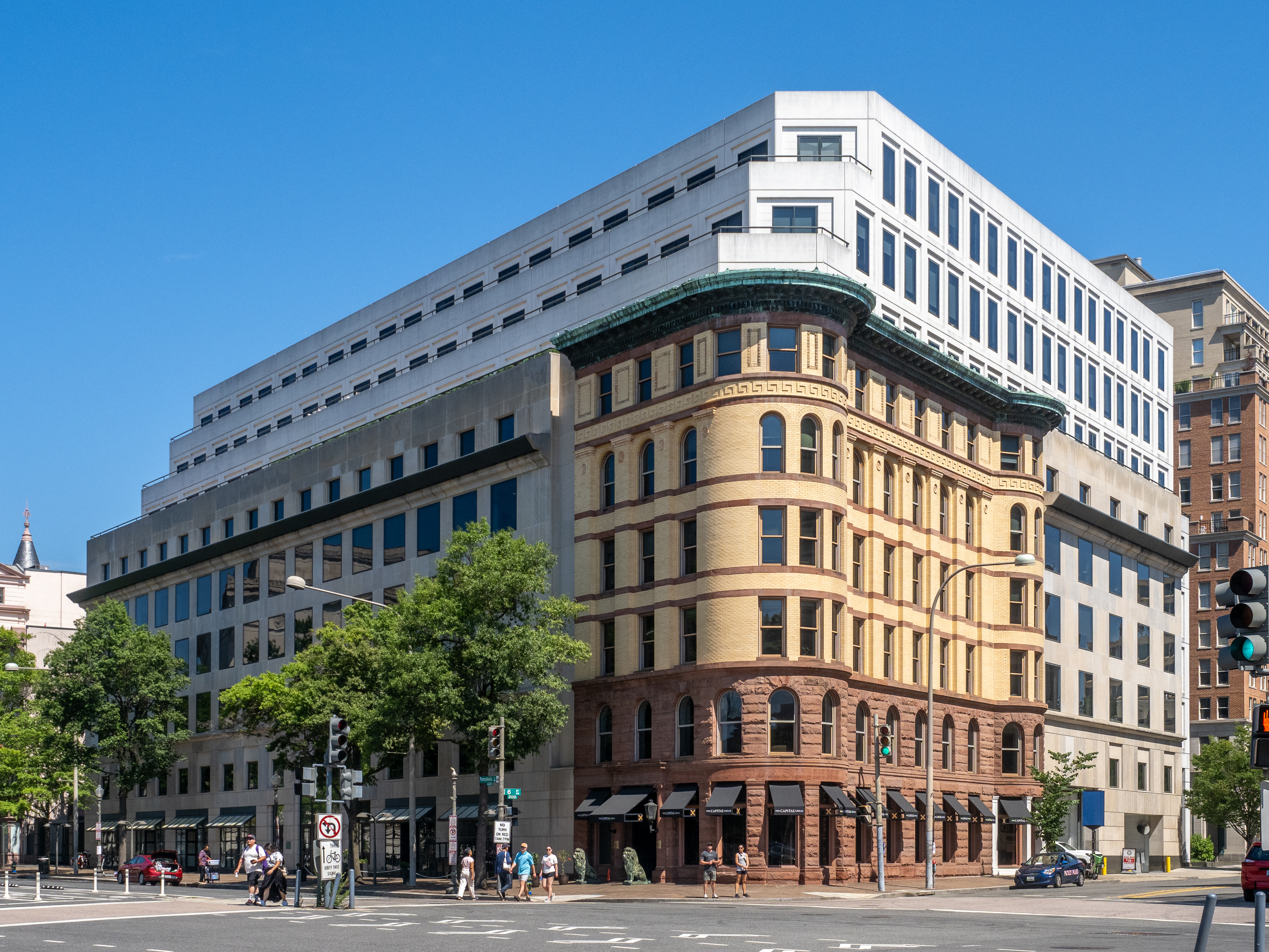
- (2024)
- Interactive map of the The Pennsylvania North area

General information
- Location: Washington, D.C., United States
- Coordinates: 38°53′35.8″N 77°01′13.7″W
- Completed: 1990

Height
- Roof: 160 feet (49 m)

Technical details
- Floor count: 14

Design and construction
- Architect: Hartman-Cox Architects

The Pennsylvania North is a high-rise building located in Washington, D.C., United States. The building was constructed in 1990. The building rises to 160 feet (49 m), containing 14 floors. The architect of the building was Hartman-Cox Architects. The building serves as an office use building.

== See also ==
- List of tallest buildings in Washington, D.C.
