= 455 Massachusetts Avenue =

Coordinates: 38°54′3.7″N 77°1′4.6″W

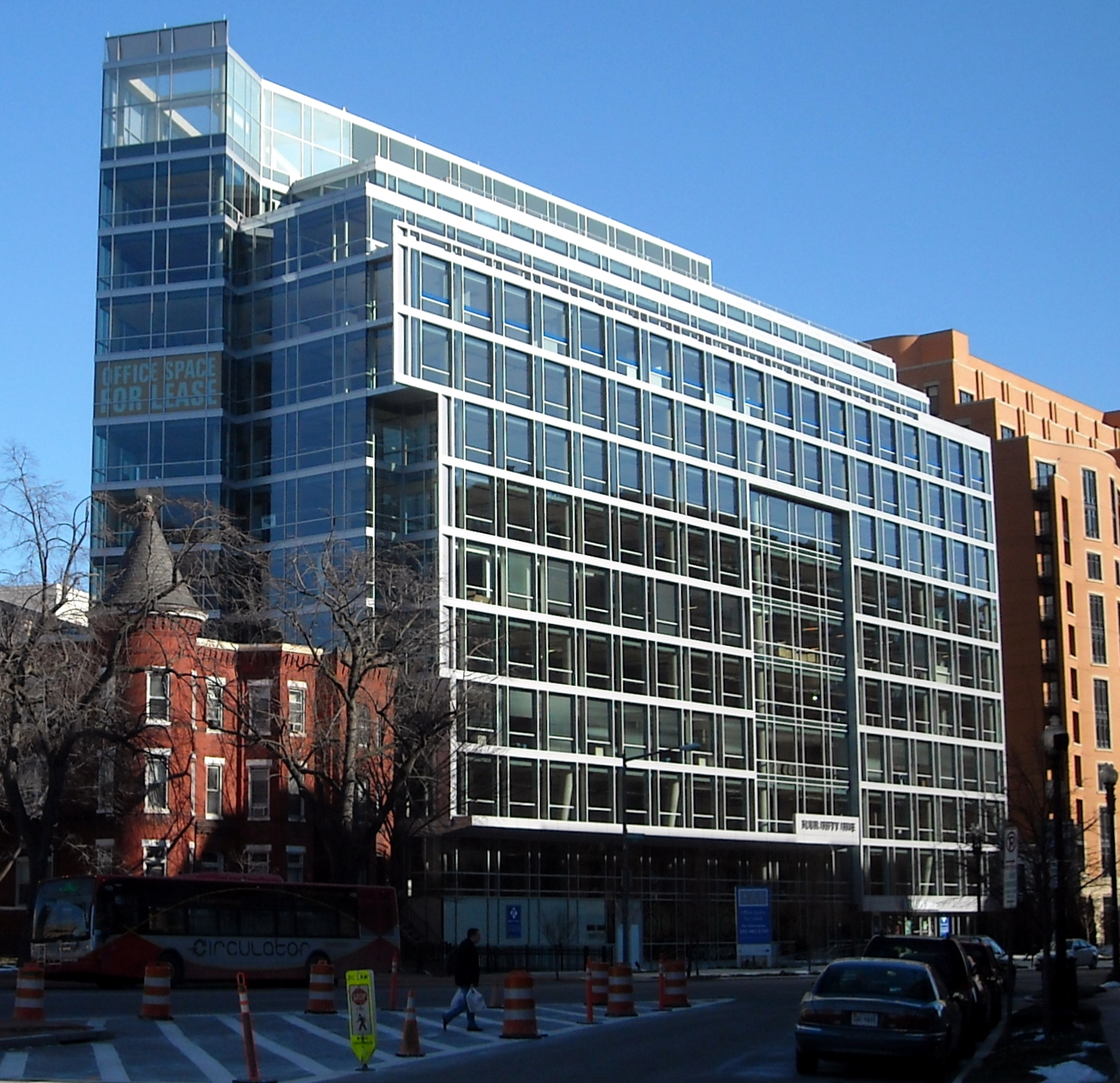
- 455 Massachusetts Avenue in January 2010
- Interactive map of the 455 Massachusetts Avenue area

General information
- Type: Office
- Location: 455 Massachusetts Avenue, Washington, D.C., U.S.
- Construction started: 2006
- Completed: 2007

Height
- Roof: 151 feet (46 m)

Technical details
- Floor count: 12
- Floor area: 22,000 square feet (2,000 m^{2})

Design and construction
- Architect: Gensler

455 Massachusetts Avenue is a high-rise office building located in the Mount Vernon Triangle neighborhood of Washington, D.C., United States. The 12-floor building was designed by Gensler and completed in 2007, and rises to 151 feet (46 m).

== Tenants ==
- Citizens for Responsibility and Ethics in Washington
- National Democratic Institute
- PATH

== See also ==
- List of tallest buildings in Washington, D.C.
