= Connecticut Connection =

Building in Washington, D.C., U.S.

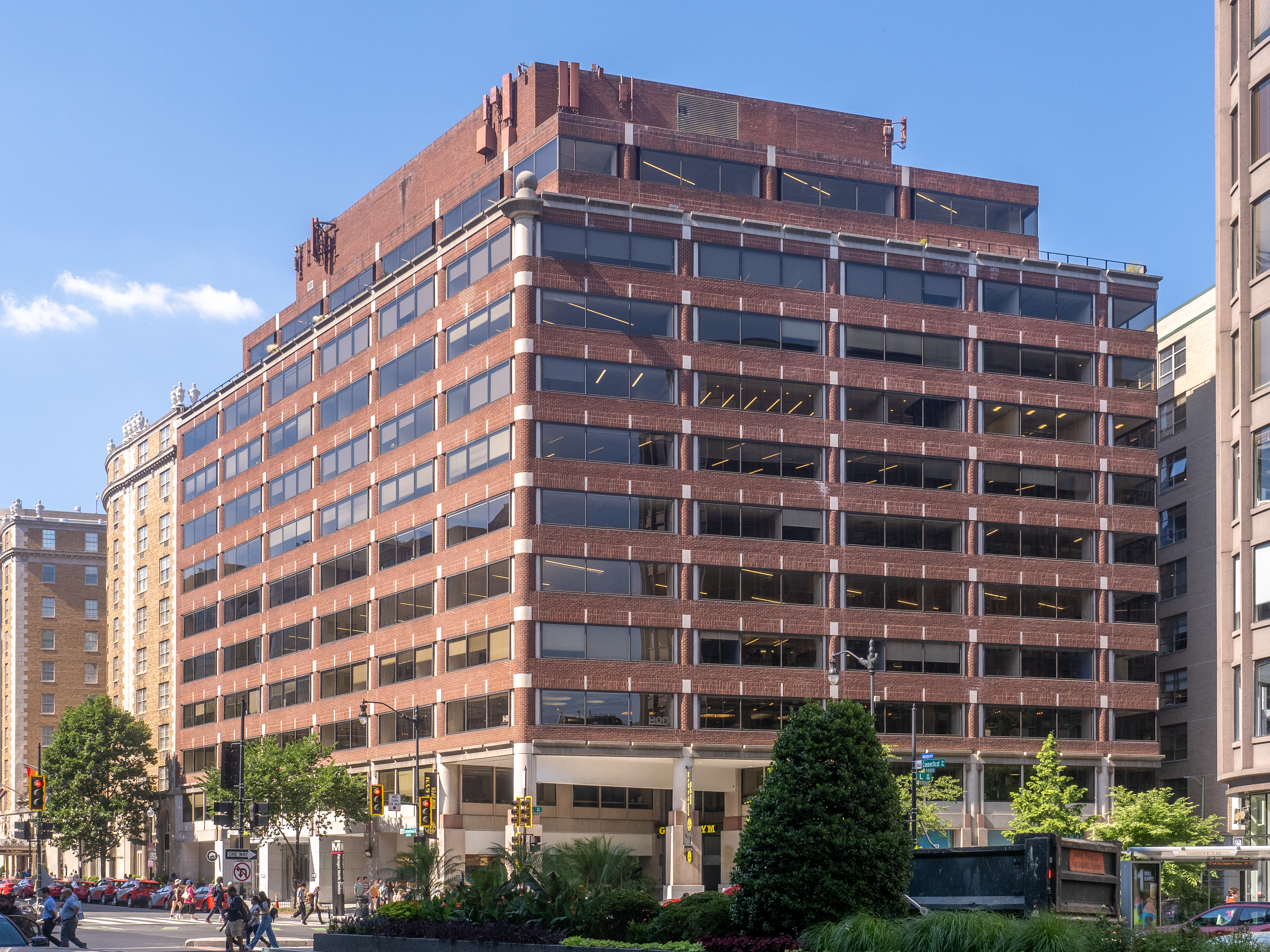
- Interactive map of the Connecticut Connection area

General information
- Location: 1101 Connecticut Ave NW, Washington, D.C., U.S.
- Coordinates: 38.9038°N 77.0397°W
- Completed: 1978

Height
- Roof: 150 feet (46 m)

Technical details
- Floor count: 12

Design and construction
- Architects: Skidmore, Owings & Merrill (Washington)

Connecticut Connection is a high-rise building located at 1101 Connecticut Avenue NW in the United States capital of Washington, D.C. The building stands at a height of 150 feet (46 m) and has 12 stories. Construction of the building was completed in 1978. The architect of the building was Skidmore, Owings & Merrill, who created the postmodern design and aesthetic of the building.

== See also ==
- List of tallest buildings in Washington, D.C.
