= 1900 K Street =

Coordinates: 38.902°N 77.0438°W

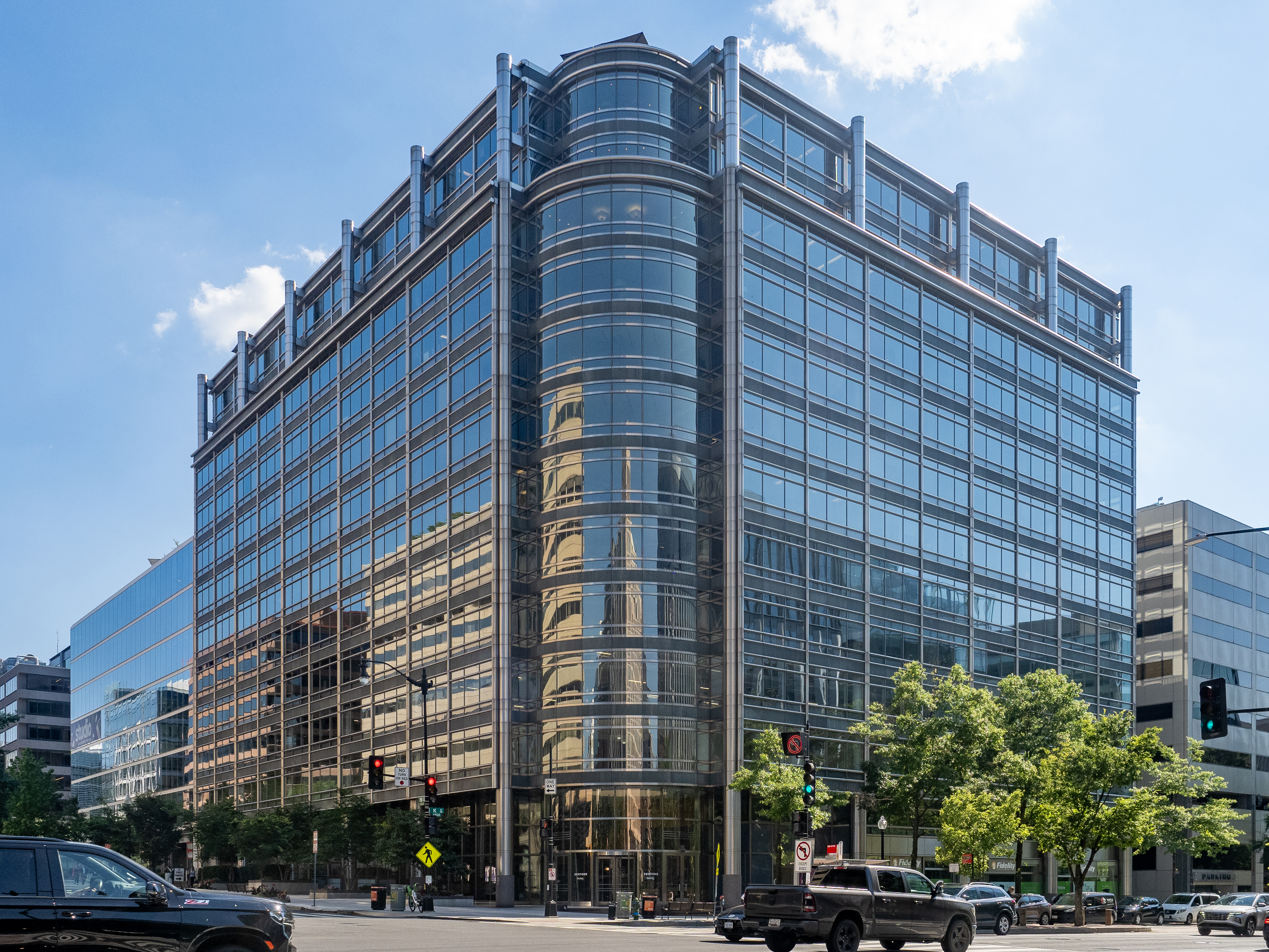
- Interactive map of the 1900 K Street area

General information
- Type: Office
- Location: Washington, D.C., United States
- Construction started: 1995
- Completed: 1996
- Operator: Hines

Height
- Roof: 52 metres (171 ft)

Technical details
- Floor count: 13
- Floor area: 102,851 m^{2} (1,107,080 sq ft)
- Lifts/elevators: 9

Design and construction
- Architects: Cesar Pelli & Associates Architects

1900 K Street is a high-rise building located in Washington, D.C., United States. The building broke ground in 1995, with its construction being completed in 1996. The building rises to 52 metres (171 ft), containing 13 floors and a total floor area of 102,851 m^{2}. The architect of the building was Cesar Pelli & Associates Architects, who designed the postmodern architectural style of the building, which is built with glass and steel material. The building serves for office use. The building is managed by Hines, Inc.

== See also ==
- List of tallest buildings in Washington, D.C.
