= Capitol View (building) =

Building in Washington, D.C., U.S.

- Interactive map of the Capitol View area

General information
- Type: Office/Corporate
- Location: 425 3rd Street SW Washington, D.C., U.S.
- Coordinates: 38.8836°N 77.0155°W
- Construction started: 2006
- Completed: 2007
- Owner: Square 537 Associates LLC

Technical details
- Floor count: 12
- Floor area: 317,000 sq ft (29,500 m^{2})

Design and construction
- Architect: Shalom Baranes Associates

Capitol View is a high-rise building located in Washington, D.C., the capital of the United States. Construction of the building began in 2006 and was completed in 2007. The building's architectural style is modern, with the building material being granite. The building was developed by the architectural company, Shalom Baranes Associates, PC. The building was constructed by Clark Construction. The building is estimated to have cost US$37 million to construct. The building was awarded the 2007 Washington Building Congress Craftsmanship Award for Sitework.

== See also ==
- List of tallest buildings in Washington, D.C.
