= 1001 Pennsylvania Avenue =

Coordinates: 38.895°N 77.0264°W

- Interactive map of the 1001 Pennsylvania Avenue area

General information
- Type: Office
- Location: 1001 Pennsylvania Avenue NW, Washington, D.C., U.S.
- Completed: 1987

Height
- Roof: 160 feet (49 m)

Technical details
- Floor count: 14

Design and construction
- Architects: Hartman-Cox Architects, Smith, Segreti, Tepper, McMahon & Harned

1001 Pennsylvania Avenue is a highrise office building in Washington, D.C., on Pennsylvania Avenue. The 49-metre (161 ft) building has 14 floors and its construction ended in 1987. The building serves as the headquarters of the Carlyle Group.

== See also ==
- List of tallest buildings in Washington, D.C.
