= Tower Building (Washington, D.C.) =

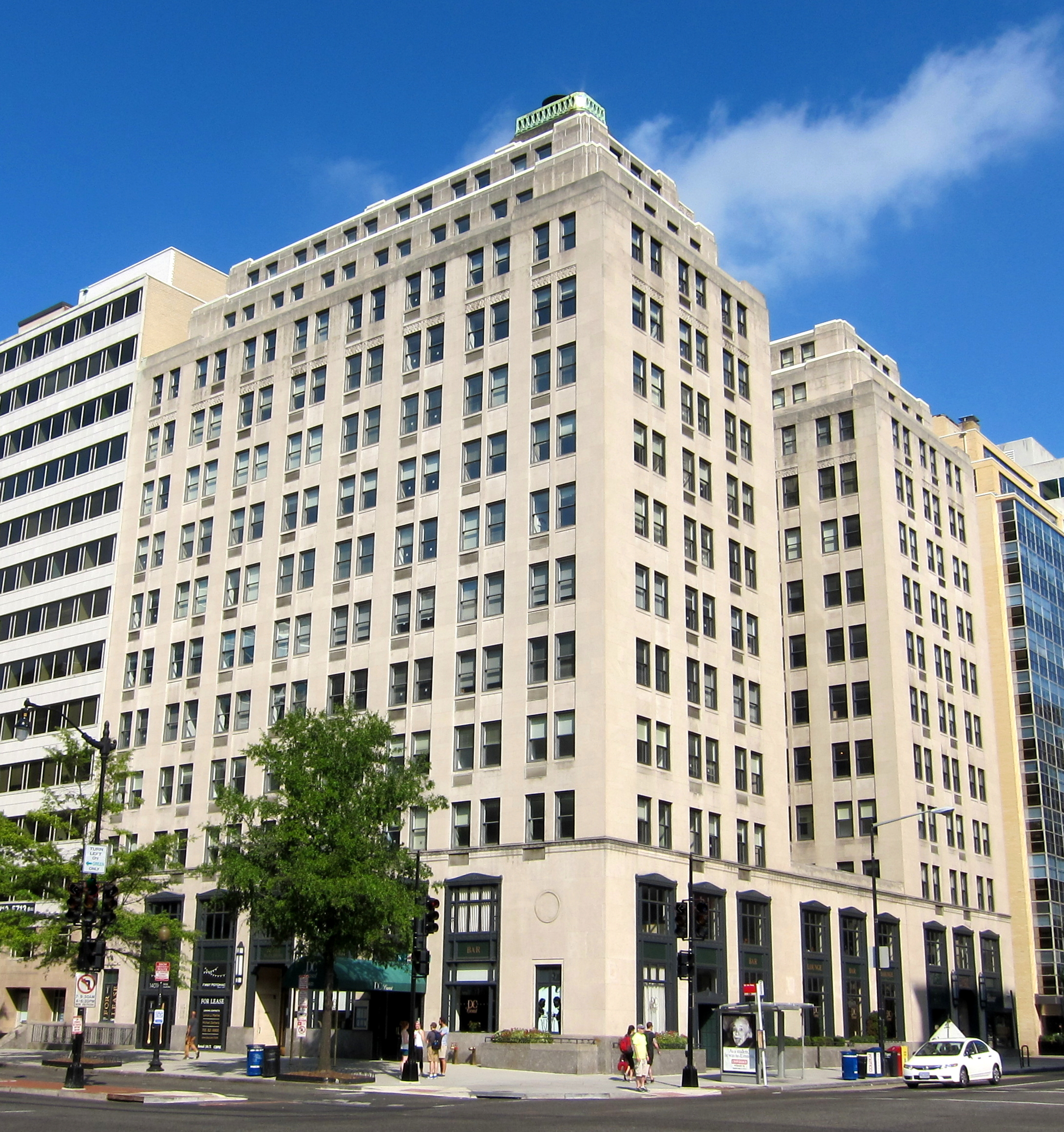
- Tower Building in 2015
- Interactive map of the Tower Building area

General information
- Type: Office
- Location: 1401 K Street, Washington, D.C., United States
- Coordinates: 38.9028°N 77.0323°W
- Completed: 1929

Height
- Roof: 177 ft (54 m)

Technical details
- Floor count: 14

Design and construction
- Architect: Robert F. Beresford
- Tower Building
- U.S. National Register of Historic Places
- Location within Central Washington, D.C.
- Architectural style: Art Deco
- NRHP reference No.: 95001084
- Added to NRHP: September 7, 1995

The Tower Building is a historic high-rise building, located at 1401 K Street, Northwest, Washington, D.C., United States and is the seventh-tallest commercial building in Washington, D.C.

== History ==
The building stands at 177 feet (54 m) with 14 floors, and was completed in 1929. It is currently the 10th-tallest building in Washington, D.C. The architect who designed the building was Robert F. Beresford. Other firms that participated in the creation of the building were Bates Warren, WDG Architecture, PLLC, and Harkins Builders, Inc. When completed in 1929, the Tower Building was the first Art Deco office building in Washington, D.C. and was created after the inspiration of the Art Deco exhibition in Paris in 1926. The Tower Building was the city's tallest high-rise at the time of completion in 1929. In 1995, this building was added to the National Register of Historic Places

== See also ==
- List of tallest buildings in Washington, D.C.
