= Avalon at Foxhall =

- Interactive map of the Avalon at Foxhall area

General information
- Type: Office
- Location: 4100 Massachusetts Ave NW; Washington, DC 20016
- Coordinates: 38.93357560505975°N 77.08202276463913°W
- Completed: 1982
- Operator: Vivmark Residential

Height
- Roof: 54 metres (177 ft)

Technical details
- Floor count: 14

Avalon at Foxhall is a high-rise building located in Washington, D.C., United States. Its construction was completed in 1982. The building rises to 54 metres (177 ft), containing 14 floors. The building is tied for the seventh-tallest commercial building in Washington, D.C., and tied for the tenth-highest building in Washington, D.C. among all buildings.

The property is owned by Vivmark Residential and is in a wooded area adjacent to Glover-Archbold Park and near the American University campus. It was originally designed as a condominium but never operated as such. The "Avalon at Foxhall" name was added around 2003, prior to which time the building was known simply by its street address.

== See also ==
- List of tallest buildings in Washington, D.C.
