= Capitol Place =

Building in Washington, D.C., United States

General information
- Location: 50 F Street, NW; Washington, D.C., United States
- Coordinates: 38.897°N 77.0107°W

Height
- Roof: 164 feet (50 m)

Technical details
- Floor count: 12

Capitol Place is a high-rise office building located in Washington, D.C., United States. The building rises to 164 feet (50 m), with 12 floors.

== See also ==
- List of tallest buildings in Washington, D.C.
