= List of tallest buildings in Washington, D.C. =

Coordinates: 38°54′17″N 77°00′59″W

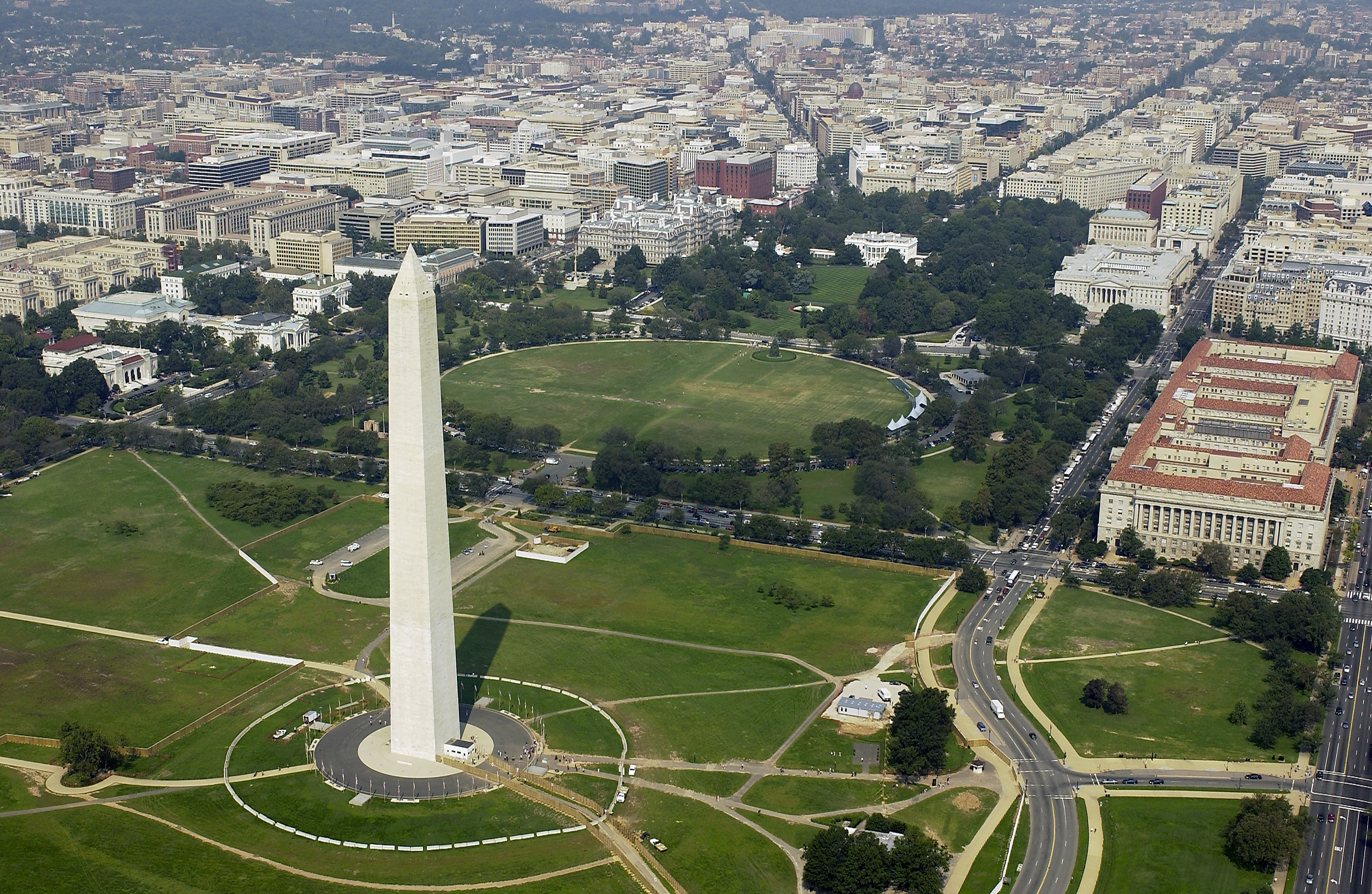
Aerial image of the Washington Monument, the tallest building structure in Washington, D.C., with the White House visible in the center background

This list of tallest buildings in Washington, D.C., ranks high-rises in the U.S. capital of Washington, D.C. The height of buildings in the District is limited by the Height of Buildings Act of 1910. The tallest structure in the city, excluding radio towers, is the Washington Monument, which rises 555 feet (169 m) and was completed in 1884. The structure, however, is not generally considered a high-rise building as it does not have successive floors that can be occupied. The tallest habitable building in the city is the Basilica of the National Shrine of the Immaculate Conception, which rises 329 feet (100 m).

The second-tallest building in Washington, D.C., is the Old Post Office Building, which is 315 feet (96 m) high. The third-tallest building in the city is the Washington National Cathedral, which rises 301 feet (92 m) above grade. The cathedral is built on high ground known as Mount St. Alban, 400 feet (120 m) above sea level, which makes the central tower the "highest" point in the District. As of November 2011, there are 410 completed high-rises in the city.

== History ==
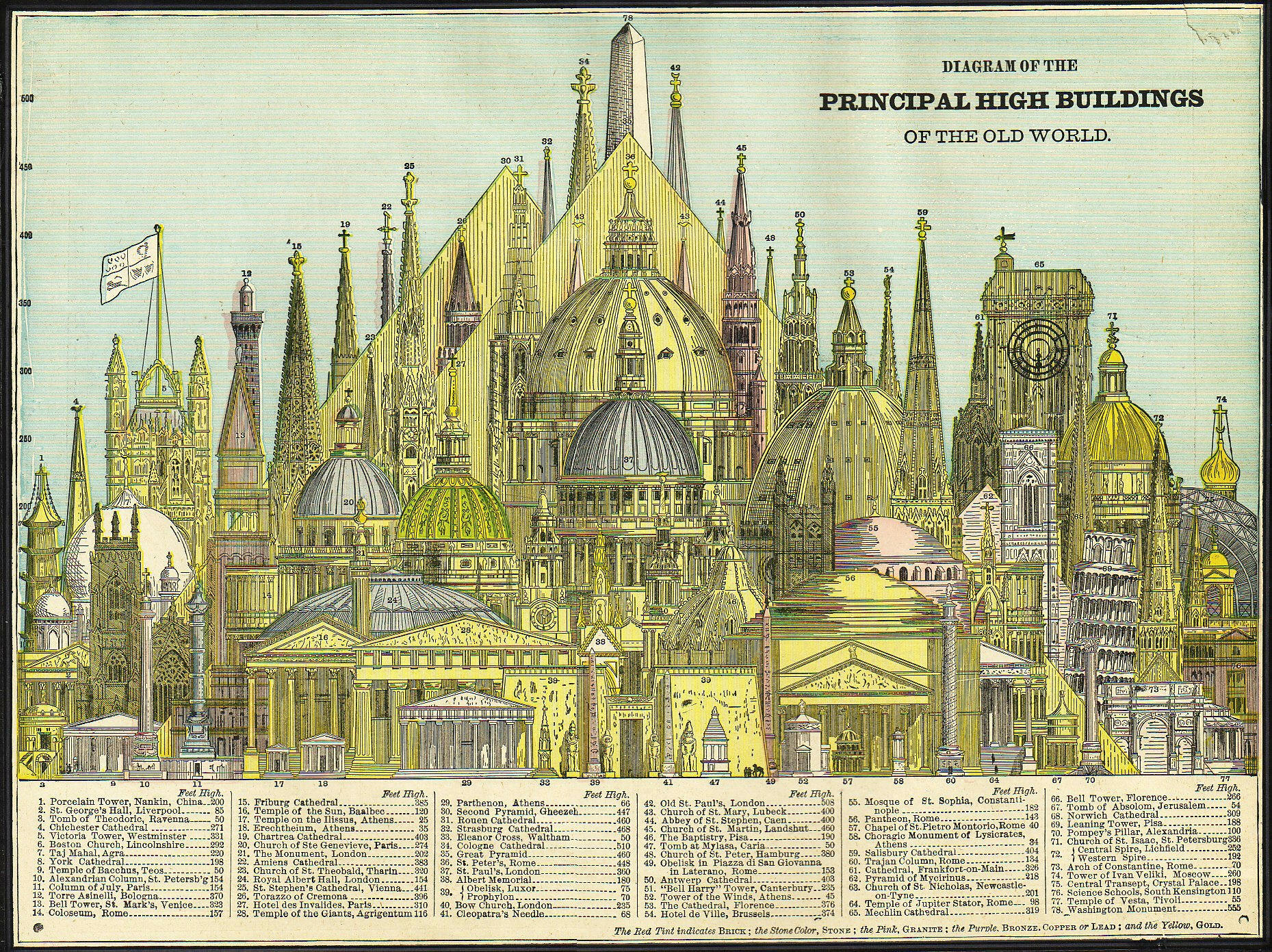
Diagram of the Principal High Buildings of the Old World, 1884; the Washington Monument is the tallest structure represented.

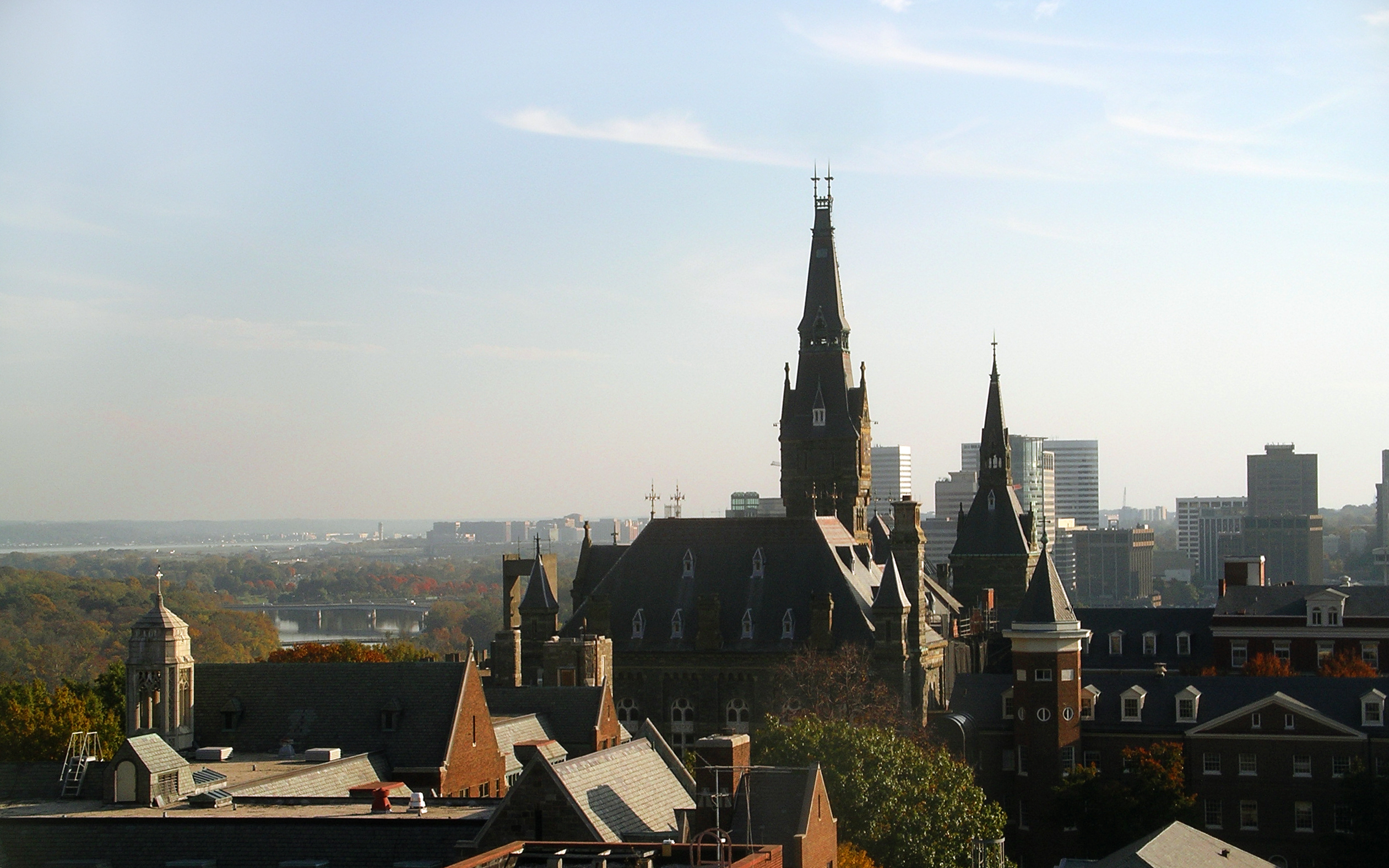
Arlington's Rosslyn and Crystal City skylines as seen from Georgetown University

Washington, D.C.'s history of high-rises began with the completion in 1894 of The Cairo, an apartment building, which is considered to be the city's first high-rise. The building rises 164 feet (50 m) and 14 floors. Washington, D.C., went through an early high-rise construction boom from the late 1890s to the mid-1930s, during which time the Old Post Office Building and the Federal Triangle were built. The city then experienced a major building boom from the early 1940s to the late 1990s, during which the city saw the completion of 31 of its 48 tallest buildings, including One Franklin Square and 700 Eleventh Street. However, although the city is home to several high-rises, none are considered to be genuine "skyscrapers"; only two completed buildings surpass 200 feet (61 m).

The height of buildings in Washington is limited by the Height of Buildings Act. The original Act was passed by Congress in 1899 in response to the 1894 construction of the Cairo Hotel, which is much taller than the majority of buildings in the city. The original act restricted the heights of any type of building in the city to be no higher than 110 feet (34 m), 90 feet (27 m) for residential buildings.

In 1910, the 61st United States Congress enacted a new law which raised the overall building height limit to 130 feet (40 m), but restricted building heights to the width of the adjacent street or avenue plus 20 feet (6.1 m); thus, a building facing a 90-foot (27 m)-wide street could be only 110 feet (34 m) tall. However, building heights are measured from the sidewalk or curb to the edge of the roof. Architectural embellishments, mechanical rooms, and common rooftop structures may be exempted from the overall height limit, provided they are set back from the roof line. The heights of buildings listed here may therefore exceed the general height limit as measured for the purpose of the city's zoning laws.

In modern times, the skyline remains low and sprawling, keeping with Thomas Jefferson's wishes to make Washington an "American Paris" with "low and convenient" buildings on "light and airy" streets. Washington's height restriction, however, has been assailed as one of the primary reasons why the city has inflated rents, limited affordable housing, and traffic problems as a result of urban sprawl. Much like La Défense near Paris, many of the region's tallest buildings near the central business district are located in Rosslyn, Virginia, directly across the Potomac River from Georgetown.

One of the most recently completed buildings in Washington, D.C., is Capitol View, which is 171 feet (52 m) high. As of July 2008, there is one high-rise under construction in the city that is expected to rise at least 150 feet (46 m), with one more proposed and one approved for construction. Onyx on First was the first high-rise built in Washington; upon completion, it was the 14th-tallest building in the city. Two other large developments taking place are Square 54 Residential I, which is proposed for construction, and the PNC Bank Building, which is approved. The Square Residential I building at George Washington University is expected to rise to a height of 160 feet (49 m) and 14 stories, while the PNC Bank Building is expected to rise to a height of 151 feet (46 m) and 12 stories.

As of July 2008, there is a total of four high-rise buildings under construction, approved for construction and proposed for construction in Washington.

== Tallest buildings ==
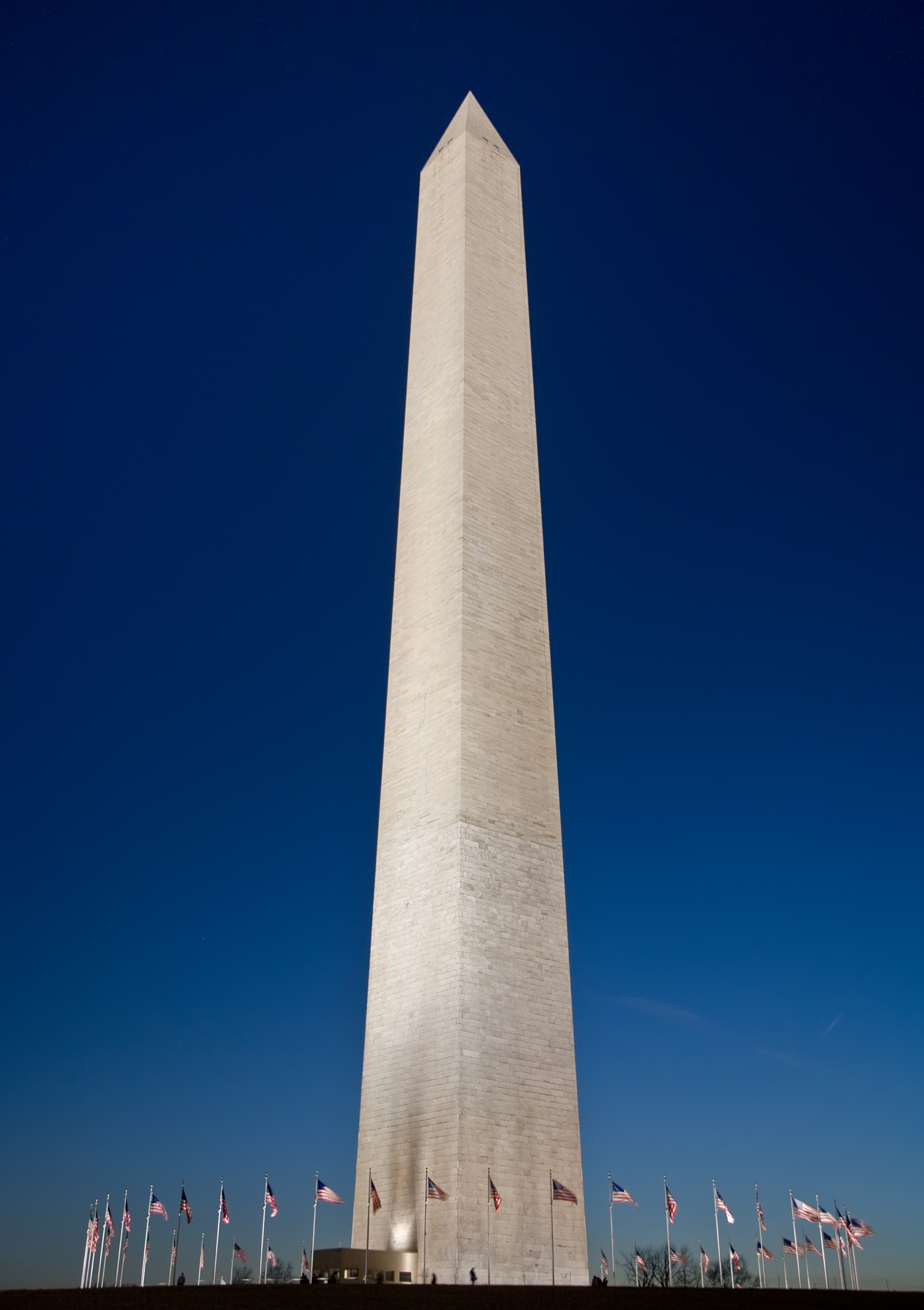
The Washington Monument is the tallest structure in the District of Columbia.

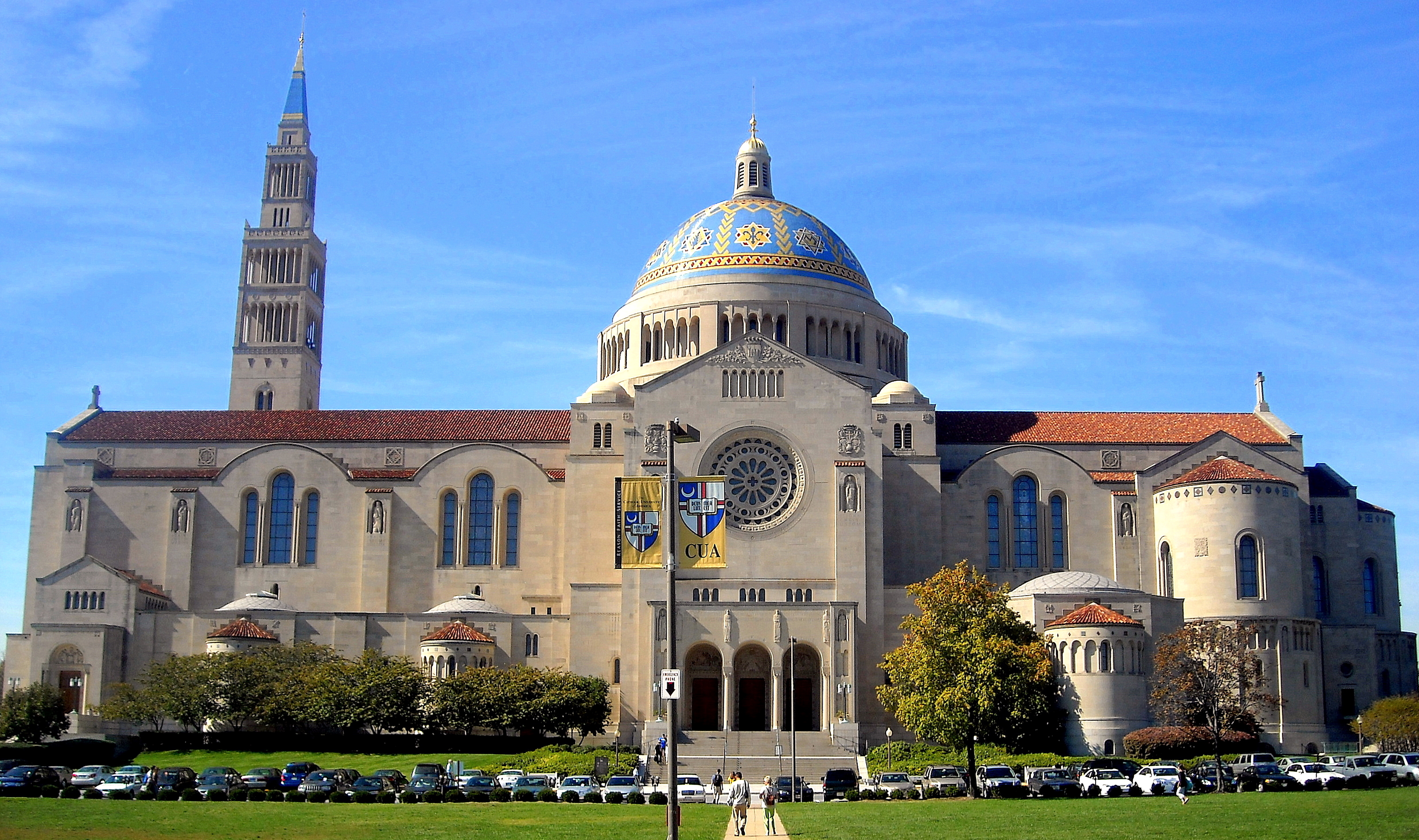
The Basilica of the National Shrine of the Immaculate Conception is the tallest building in Washington.

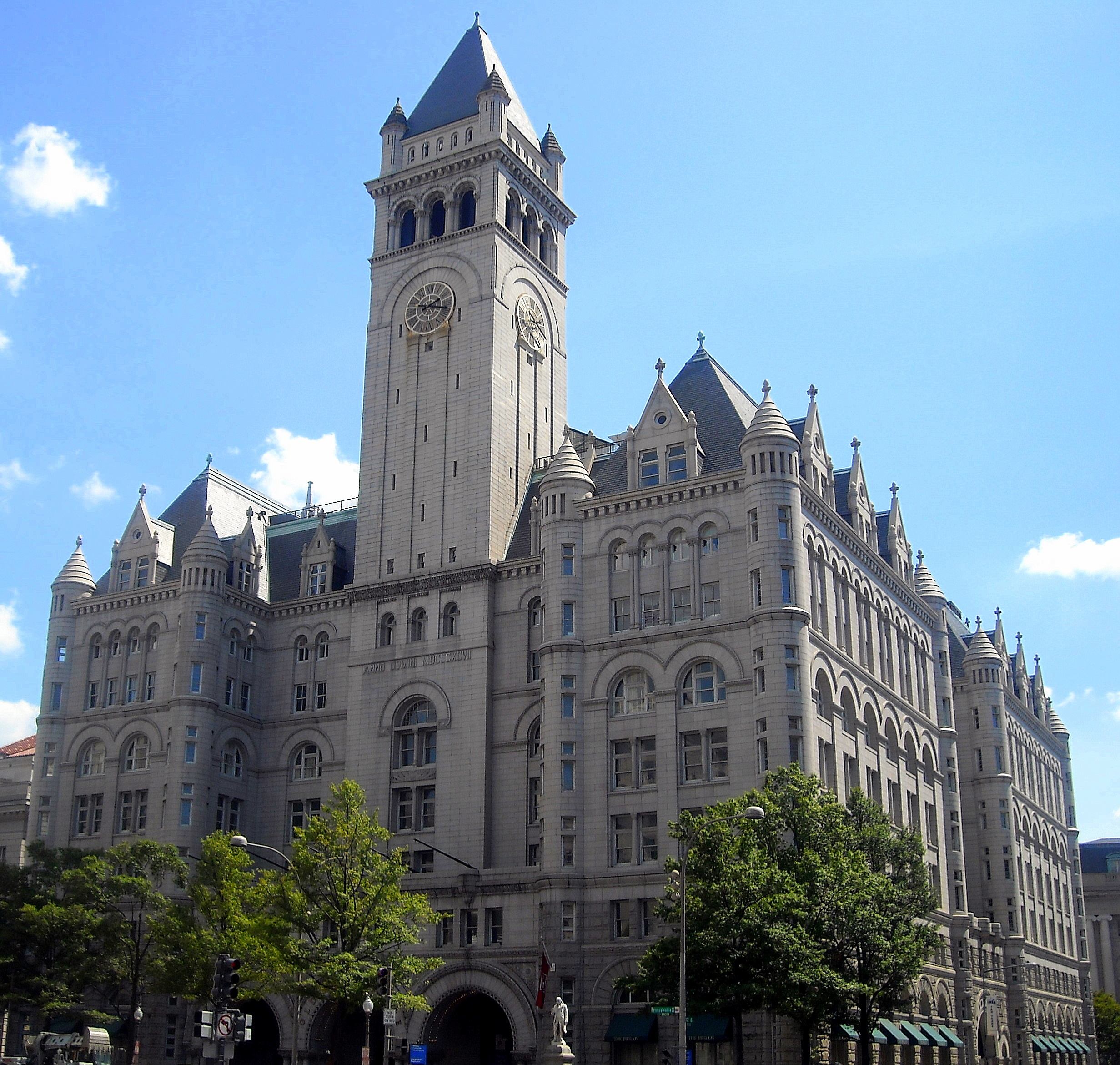
The Old Post Office Building, the second-tallest building in Washington

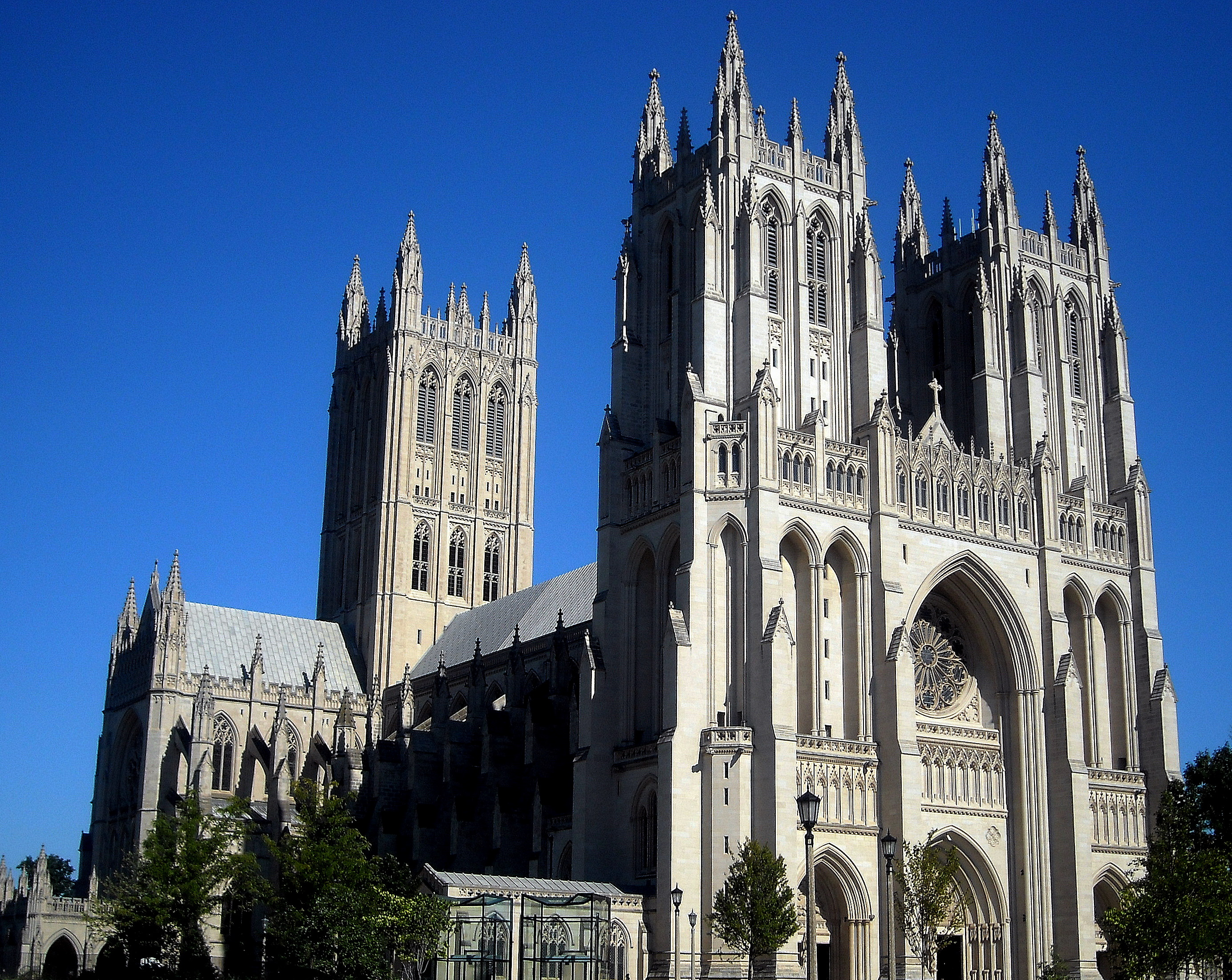
The Washington National Cathedral, the third-tallest building in Washington

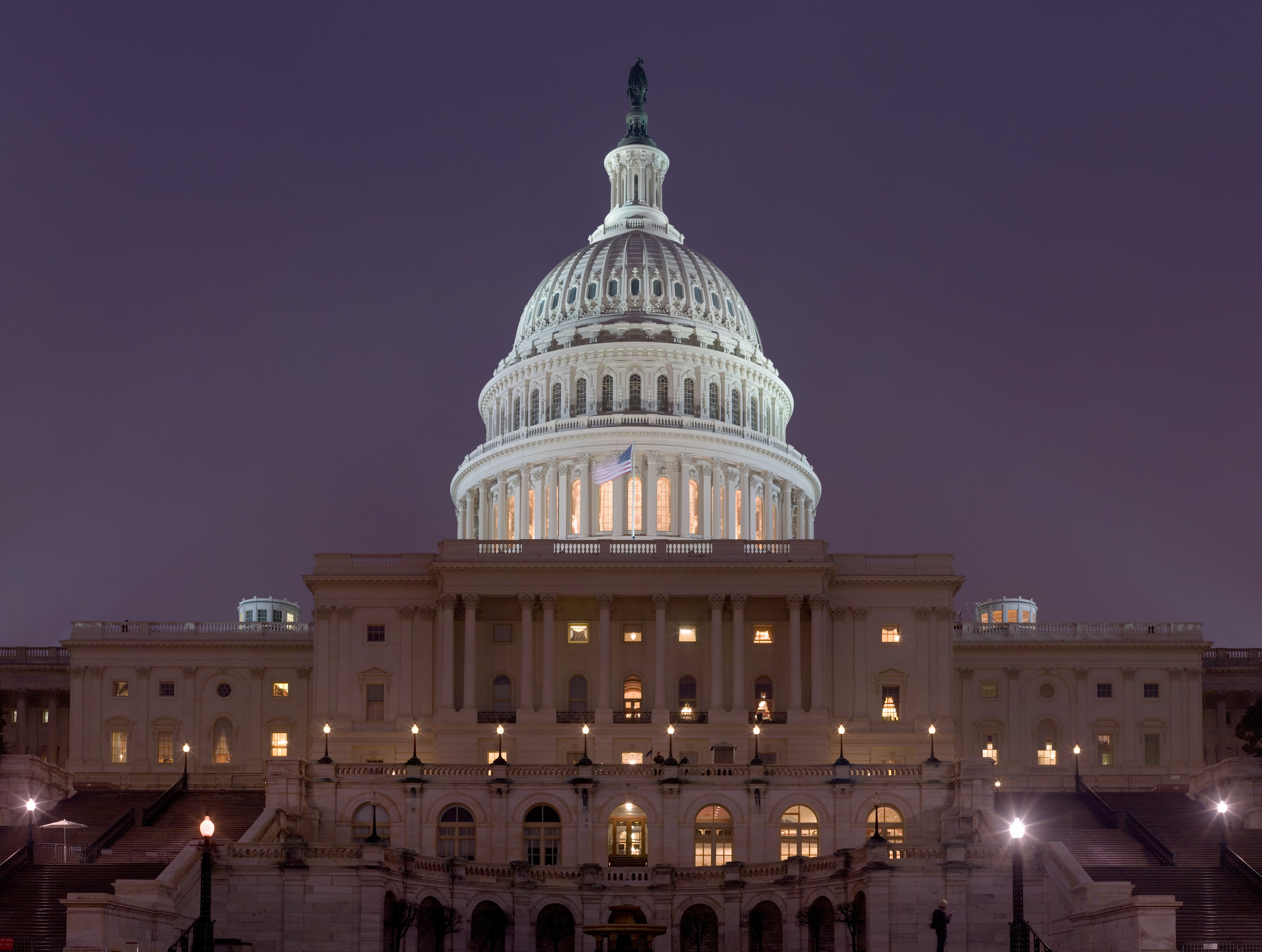
The United States Capitol, the fourth-tallest building in Washington

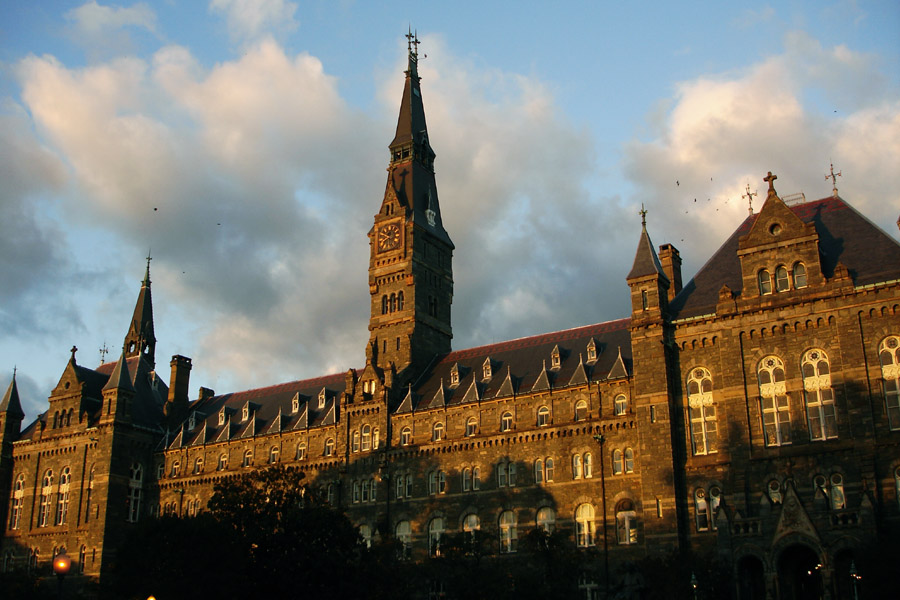
Georgetown University's Healy Hall, the sixth-tallest building in Washington

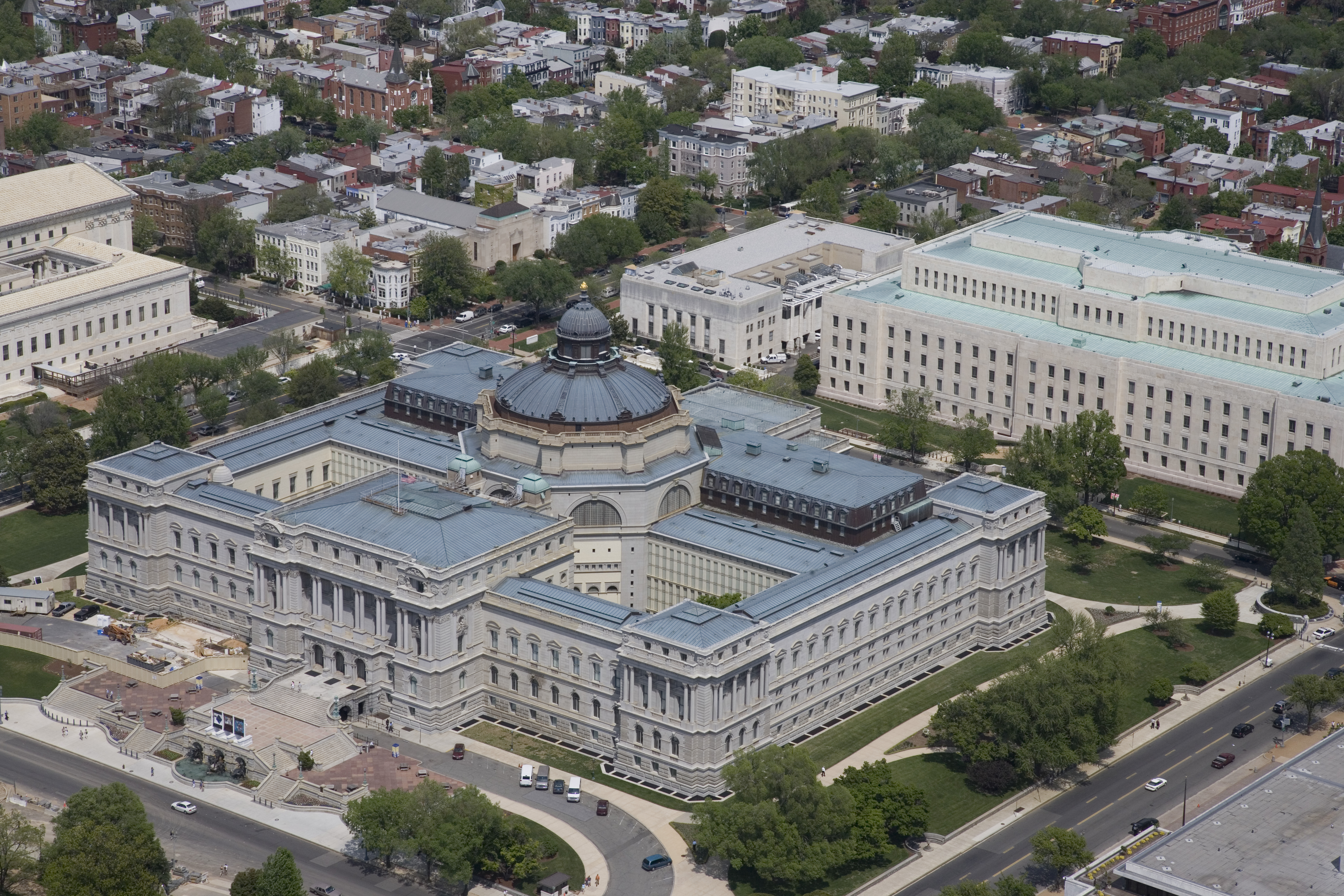
The Thomas Jefferson Building, the ninth-tallest building in Washington

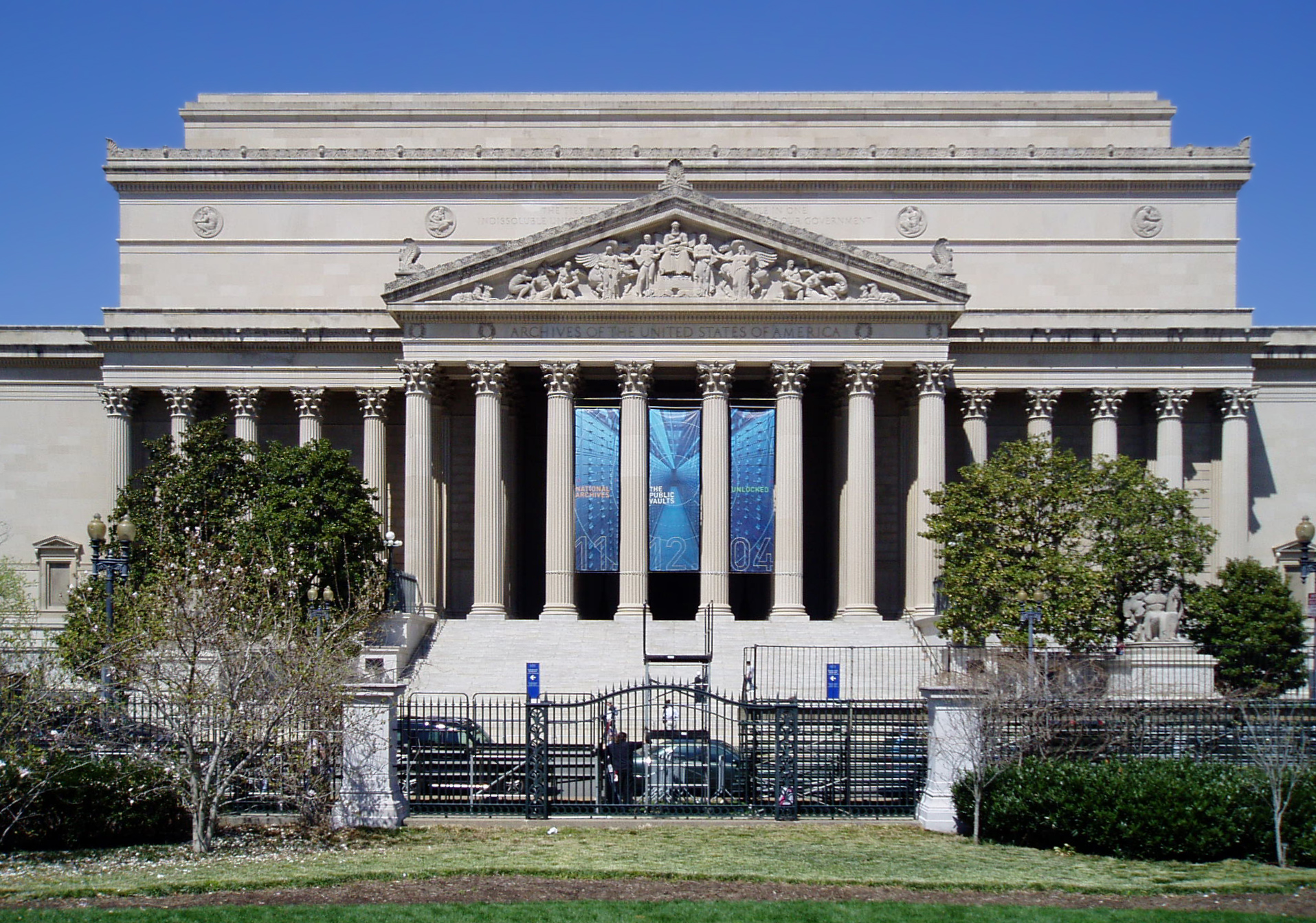
The National Archives Building, the sixteenth-tallest building in Washington

This lists ranks Washington, D.C.'s high-rises that stand at least 150 feet (46 m), based on standard height measurement. This includes spires and architectural details but does not include antenna masts. The "Year" column indicates the year in which a building was completed. Freestanding towers, while not habitable buildings, are included for comparison purposes; however, they are not ranked. The majority of the tallest structures in the city are tall broadcasting towers located in the northern and western sections of the district.

Rank	Name	Height ft (m)	Floors	Year	Notes
	Hughes Memorial Tower^{[A]}	761 (232)	0	1989	Tallest free-standing structure in the District of Columbia and second tallest in the wider Washington-Baltimore metropolitan area after the River Rd. tower in Bethesda.
	WTTG TV Tower	705 (215)	0	1963	
	WJLA TV Tower	692 (211)	0	1972	
	WRC TV Tower	662 (202)	0	1989	
	Washington Monument^{[A]}	555 (169)	3	1884	Tallest concrete structure in the District. Was the tallest structure in the world from 1884 until 1889, and the tallest monument in the U.S. until the completion of San Jacinto in 1939.
	Washington Police Department Tower	506 (154)	0		
	WETA-FM	495 (151)	0	2014	
	WAVA-FM Tower	457 (139)	0	1992	
	Old WRC TV Tower	443 (135)	0	1957	
	American University Tower	428 (129)	0	2011	
	Old WJLA TV Tower	375 (114)	0	1947	
1	Basilica of the National Shrine of the Immaculate Conception	329 (100)	1	1959	Tallest building in Washington, D.C., since 1959. Tallest constructed in the city in the 1950s.
2	Old Post Office Pavilion	315 (96)	12	1899	Tallest building constructed in the city in the 1890s.
3	Washington National Cathedral	301 (92)	7	1910–1990	Tallest building completed in the city in the 1990s.
4	United States Capitol	289 (88)	3	1863	Tallest building constructed in the city in the 1860s.
5	One Franklin Square	210 (64)	12	1989	Tallest commercial building in Washington, D.C., Tallest constructed in the city in the 1980s. Home to the headquarters of The Washington Post since 2015.
6	700 Eleventh Street	200 (61)	13	1992	
6	Healy Hall	200 (61)	4½	1879	
8	Onyx on First	197 (60)	14	2008	Tallest residential building in Washington, D.C., Tallest completed in the city in the 2000s.
9	Thomas Jefferson Building	195 (59)	7	1897	Originally named the Library of Congress building
10	New Stadium at RFK Campus	195 (59)	N/A	2030	
11	The Westin DC Downtown	187 (57)	15	1986	
11	1090 Vermont Avenue	187 (57)	12	1979	Tallest building constructed in the city in the 1970s.
12	1111 Pennsylvania Avenue	180 (55)	14	1968	Tallest building constructed in the city in the 1960s.
13	The Tower Building	177 (54)	14	1929	Tallest building constructed in the city in the 1920s.
13	Avalon at Foxhall	177 (54)	14	1982	Tallest residential building in the city from 1982 until 2008.
15	1900 K Street	171 (52)	13	1996	
15	Capitol View	171 (52)	13	2007	
17	National Archives Building	167 (51)	8	1935	Tallest building constructed in the city in the 1930s.
17	1150 K Street	167 (51)	14	2005	
19	The Pennsylvania North	164 (50)	14	1990	
19	The Cairo	164 (50)	14	1894	
21	Capitol Place III	164 (50)	12	1985	
21	1101 New York Avenue	164 (50)	12	2007	
23	1625 Eye Street	161 (49)	12	2003	
23	World Bank Headquarters	161 (49)	13	1997	
25	1001 Pennsylvania Avenue	161 (49)	14	1987	
25	1201 Pennsylvania Avenue	161 (49)	13	1981	
25	600 Thirteenth Street	161 (49)	12	1997	
28	The Watergate Hotel and Office Building	157 (48)	14	1967	
28	Republic Building	157 (48)	13	1991	
28	Army and Navy Club Building	157 (48)	12	1987	
28	1620 L Street	157 (48)	12	1989	
28	1333 H Street	157 (48)	12	1982	
28	1111 19th Street	157 (48)	12	1979	
28	1010 Mass	157 (48)	15	2007	
35	1099 14th Street (Franklin Court)	155.6 (47.4)	11	1992	Tallest tower in the city when built in 1992.
36	The Investment Building	154 (47)	13	2001	
36	Capital Hilton	154 (47)	13	1943	Tallest building constructed in the city in the 1940s.
36	1875 K Street	154 (47)	12	2001	
36	1430 K Street	154 (47)	12	2006	
36	1310 G Street	154 (47)	12	1992	
36	Westin Washington, D.C., City Center	154 (47)	14	1982	
36	Executive Tower	154 (47)	12	2001	
36	1701 Pennsylvania Avenue	154 (47)	13	1962	
44	Washington Gas Building	151 (46)	15	1941	
44	The Watergate South	151 (46)	14	1970	
44	World Bank Headquarters I	151 (46)	12	2001	
44	World Bank Headquarters H	151 (46)	12	1983	
44	William T. Golden Center for Science and Engineering	151 (46)	12	1996	
44	Connecticut Connection	151 (46)	12	1978	
44	455 Massachusetts Avenue	151 (46)	12	2007	

== Tallest demolished ==
This lists buildings in Washington that have been demolished and at one time stood at least 150 feet (46 m) in height.

Name	Height ft (m)	Floors	Year completed	Year demolished	Notes
Munsey Trust Building	171 (52)	13	1905	1982	
1000 Connecticut Avenue	156 (48)	13	1956	2008	Was replaced with another building carrying the same address.

== Timeline of tallest buildings ==
This lists buildings that once held the title of tallest building in Washington, D.C., This list excludes the 555-foot (169 m) Washington Monument, which has stood as the tallest non-building structure in the city since 1884.

Name	Street address	Years as tallest	Height ft (m)	Floors	Reference
United States Capitol	Pennsylvania Avenue, Capitol Hill	1863–1899	289 (88)	3	
Old Post Office	1100 Pennsylvania Avenue NW	1899–1959	315 (96)	18	
Basilica of the National Shrine of the Immaculate Conception	400 Michigan Avenue NE	1959–present	329 (100)	1	

== Notes ==
A. Not a habitable building and is therefore not ranked, but it is included in this list for comparative purposes.

== See also ==
- Architecture of Washington, D.C.
