= Onyx on First =

- Interactive map of the Onyx on First area

General information
- Status: Completed in August 2008
- Location: 1100 1st St., SE Washington, D.C., United States
- Coordinates: 38°52′38.3″N 77°0′19.6″W
- Construction started: 2006
- Completed: 2008

Height
- Roof: 130 feet (40 m)

Technical details
- Floor count: 14

Design and construction
- Architects: Esocoff & Associates
- Developer: Faison/Canyon-Johnson Urban Fund

Onyx on First is a high-rise building located in the United States capital of Washington, D.C. The 260 unit building was developed by the Canyon-Johnson Urban Fund. Demolition of the original buildings in the location began in September 2006 and construction began on October 31, 2006. It was completed in August 2008 and move-in began October 2009.

The building rises 130 feet (40 m), with 14 stories and 4 below-grade parking levels. The building is an apartment complex with 266 units.

== See also ==
- List of tallest buildings in Washington, D.C.
