= 1090 Vermont Avenue =

High-rise office building in Washington, D.C., United States

Coordinates: 38°54′12″N 77°02′01″W

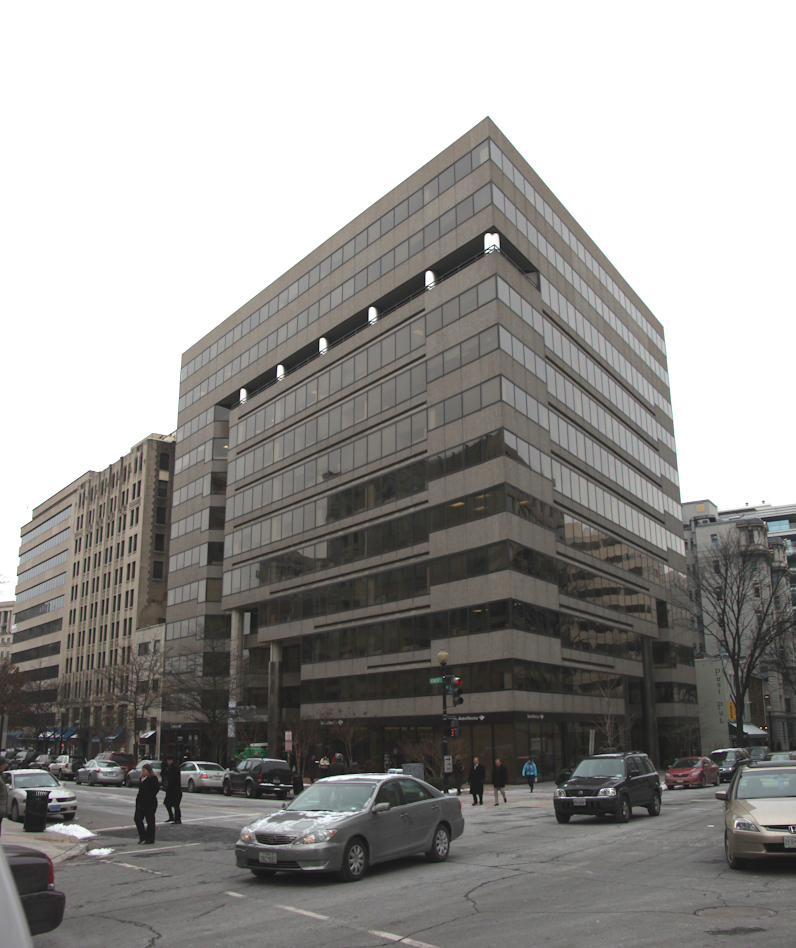
- Interactive map of the 1090 Vermont Avenue area

General information
- Type: Office
- Location: 1090 Vermont Avenue NW; Washington, D.C., U.S.
- Completed: 1980

Technical details
- Floor count: 12

Design and construction
- Architect: The John Akridge Companies
- Developer: The John Akridge Companies

1090 Vermont Avenue NW is a high-rise modernist office building in Washington, D.C., which is tied with the Renaissance Washington DC Hotel as the fourth-tallest commercial building in the city (as of January 2010). The building is 187 feet (57 metres) high and has 12 floors. It contained about 160,000 square feet (15,000 square metres) of space when it first opened, but only 150,000 square feet (14,000 square metres) by 1998. Internal build-outs increased the interior space to 187,000 square feet (17,400 square metres) by 2006.

Several small buildings and a surface parking lot originally occupied the 14,927-square foot (1,388 square metre) site. The John Akridge Companies acquired the location in January 1979 for about $200 a square foot. The buildings and parking lot were razed, and construction began in the spring of 1979.

The John Akridge Companies designed and built the structure. The building was jointly financed by Akridge and Mitsui Fudosan America, the United States branch of the giant Japanese real estate firm Mitsui Fudosan.

The building was largely completed in 1979. Although still under construction in April 1980, 90 percent of the building's space had already been leased. It had not yet been completed by May 1980, but internal construction ended later that year. The building has been described as "perfectly bland".

The building was one of five new structures built in the late 1970s which helped rejuvenate Vermont Avenue NW. Construction of the buildings marked the first time since the early 1970s that construction of new office buildings moved east of 15th Street NW rather than west. For many years in the 1980s, the building was managed by JMB Realty.

The building lobby, common areas, and elevators were upgraded in 1995. In 1998, The John Akridge Companies obtained a $21 million loan from HypoVereinsbank, a German investment bank, and used the cash to refinance its stake in the building. The cost averaged out to about $140 per square foot (0.093 square metres). Mitsui Fudosan America bought Akridge's stake in 1090 Vermont Avenue NW for $57 million in April 2007.

A 30-foot (9.1-metre) tall steel geometric sculpture titled "Sky Landscape" by sculptor Louise Berliawsky Nevelson stands across the street. The $640,000 piece of art was dedicated in March 1983.

== See also ==
- List of tallest buildings in Washington, D.C.
