= Executive Tower (Washington, D.C.) =

General information
- Type: Office
- Location: Washington, D.C., United States
- Address: 1399 New York Avenue NW
- Coordinates: 38°53′59.7″N 77°1′53″W
- Completed: 2001

Height
- Roof: 153 feet (47 m)

Technical details
- Floor count: 12

Design and construction
- Architect(s): Hellmuth, Obata & Kassabaum

Executive Tower (Washington, D.C.) is a high-rise office building located in the United States capital of Washington, D.C. Its construction was completed in 2001. It rises to a height of 153 feet (47 m), having 12 floors. The architect of the building was Hellmuth, Obata & Kassabaum.

The building's tenants include Bloomberg News and the Hoover Institution.

== See also ==
- List of tallest buildings in Washington, D.C.
