= 1310 G Street =

High-rise skyscraper in Washington, D.C., United States

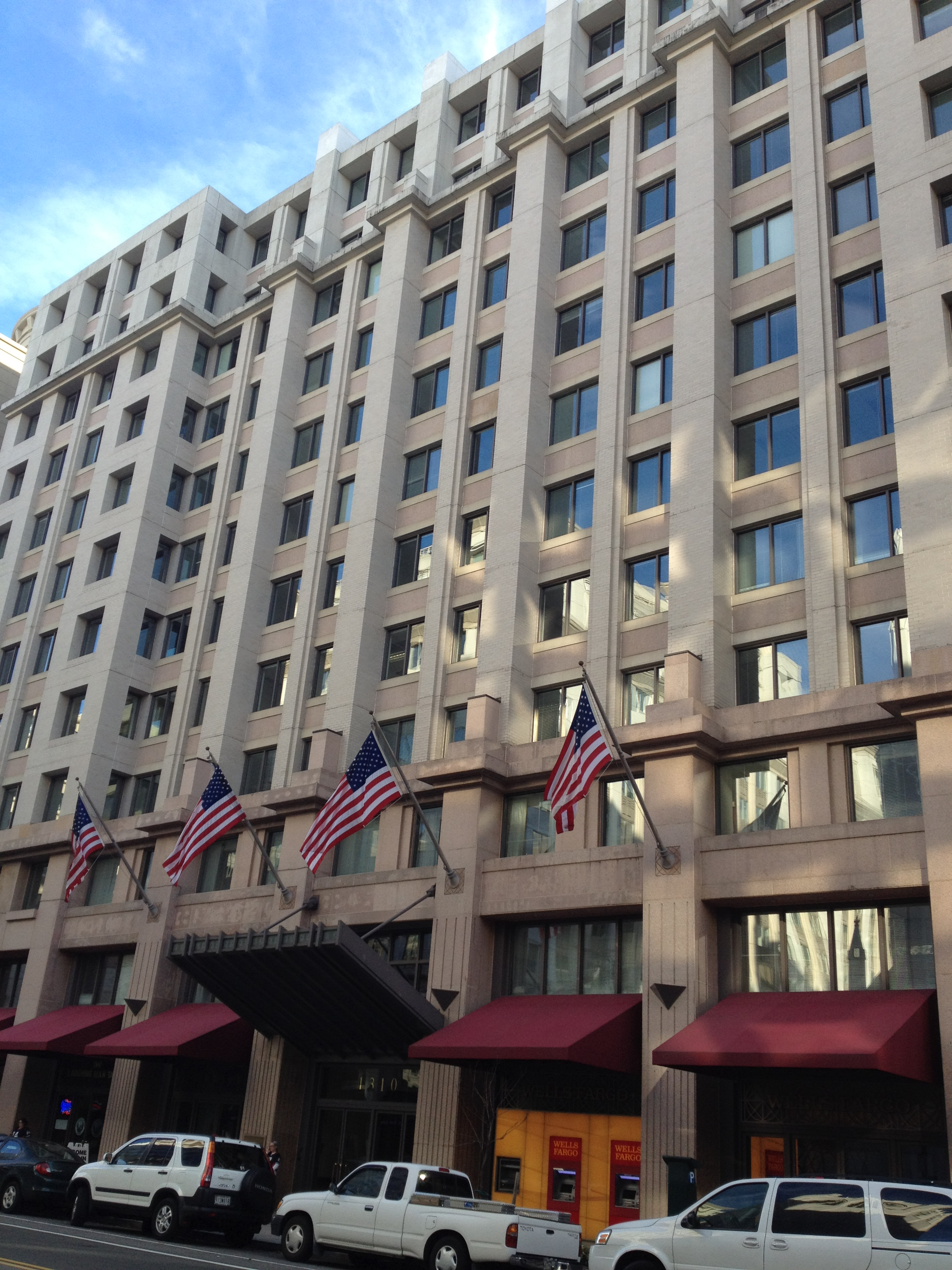
- 1310 G Street in 2011

General information
- Type: Office
- Location: Washington, D.C., United States
- Coordinates: 38.898°N 77.0304°W
- Completed: 1992

Height
- Roof: 154 feet (47 m)

Technical details
- Floor count: 12
- Floor area: 59,652 m^{2} (642,090 sq ft)

Design and construction
- Architect(s): Skidmore, Owings & Merrill

1310 G Street is a high-rise skyscraper building located in Washington, D.C., United States. Its construction was completed in 1992. With its completion, the building rose to 154 feet (47 m), and featured 12 floors with 59,652 m^{2} in total floor area. The architect of the building was Skidmore, Owings & Merrill who designed the postmodern architectural style of the building. The high-rise serves as an office building.

1310 G Street is located in the East End neighborhood of Washington, DC.

== See also ==
- List of tallest buildings in Washington, D.C.
