= Consumer Healthcare Products Association =

American trade association

- Abbreviation: CHPA
- Formation: 1881
- Purpose: over-the-counter drugs dietary supplements consumer medical devices
- Key people: Scott Melville, Chief Executive Officer
- Formerly called: Proprietary Association (1881); Nonprescription Drug Manufacturers Association(1989)

CHPA logo

The Consumer Healthcare Products Association (CHPA) is an American trade association representing the personal healthcare industry consisting of manufacturers and distributors of over-the-counter (OTC) drugs, dietary supplements, and consumer medical devices.

== Membership ==
The CHPA has approximately 63 active members and 124 associate members. The active members are companies that manufacture or distribute Over-the-counter (OTC) drugs, dietary supplements, and/or consumer medical devices. Associate members are companies that provide goods and services to the active members (e.g., suppliers, marketing agencies, research firms, lawyers, etc.).

== Activities ==
CHPA provides an opportunity for members to share information about the science of personal healthcare products. It also has an educational foundation that promotes consumer education about the importance of the proper use, storage, and disposal of personal healthcare products.

The CHPA also engages in lobbying and public relations activities on behalf of its members.

== History ==
The CHPA was founded in 1881 as the Proprietary Association. It changed its name to the Nonprescription Drug Manufacturers Association in 1989. In 1998, dietary supplement manufacturers and distributors were allowed to join the association, and its name was changed to the Consumer Healthcare Products Association the next year. Consumer medical devices were added to CHPA's scope in 2019.
