= 1430 K Street =

- Interactive map of the 1430 K Street area

General information
- Type: Office/parking garage
- Location: Washington, D.C., U.S.
- Coordinates: 38.9021°N 77.0333°W
- Construction started: 2005
- Completed: 2006

Height
- Roof: 150 feet (46 m)

Technical details
- Floor count: 12

Design and construction
- Architect: Alkridge
- Main contractor: Balfour Beatty

1430 K Street is a high-rise building located in the United States capital of Washington, D.C. The building was constructed in 2005 and its construction was completed in 2006. On its completion, the building rose to 150 feet (46 m), featuring 12 floors. The building serves as an office and parking garage.

This was the first office building in the Washington downtown to be fully sold as a condominium. Non-profit associations and lobbying groups like the American Educational Research Association are buying floors of the building to replace their previous brownstone town houses which are not now suitable to be modern offices.

The architect of the building was Alkridge, who designed the post modern design of the building. Alkridge was selected to design the building by NEST and Totah Venture, marketing organizations. Before 1430 K Street was built, two buildings were demolished in order for the construction of this building to take place.

== Tenants ==
- American Educational Research Association
- American Sociological Association
- League of United Latin American Citizens

== See also ==
- K Street (Washington, D.C.)
- List of tallest buildings in Washington, D.C.
