= PNC Bank Building (Washington, D.C.) =

Skyscraper in Washington, D.C., U.S.

Coordinates: 38°54′2.2″N 77°2′23.1″W

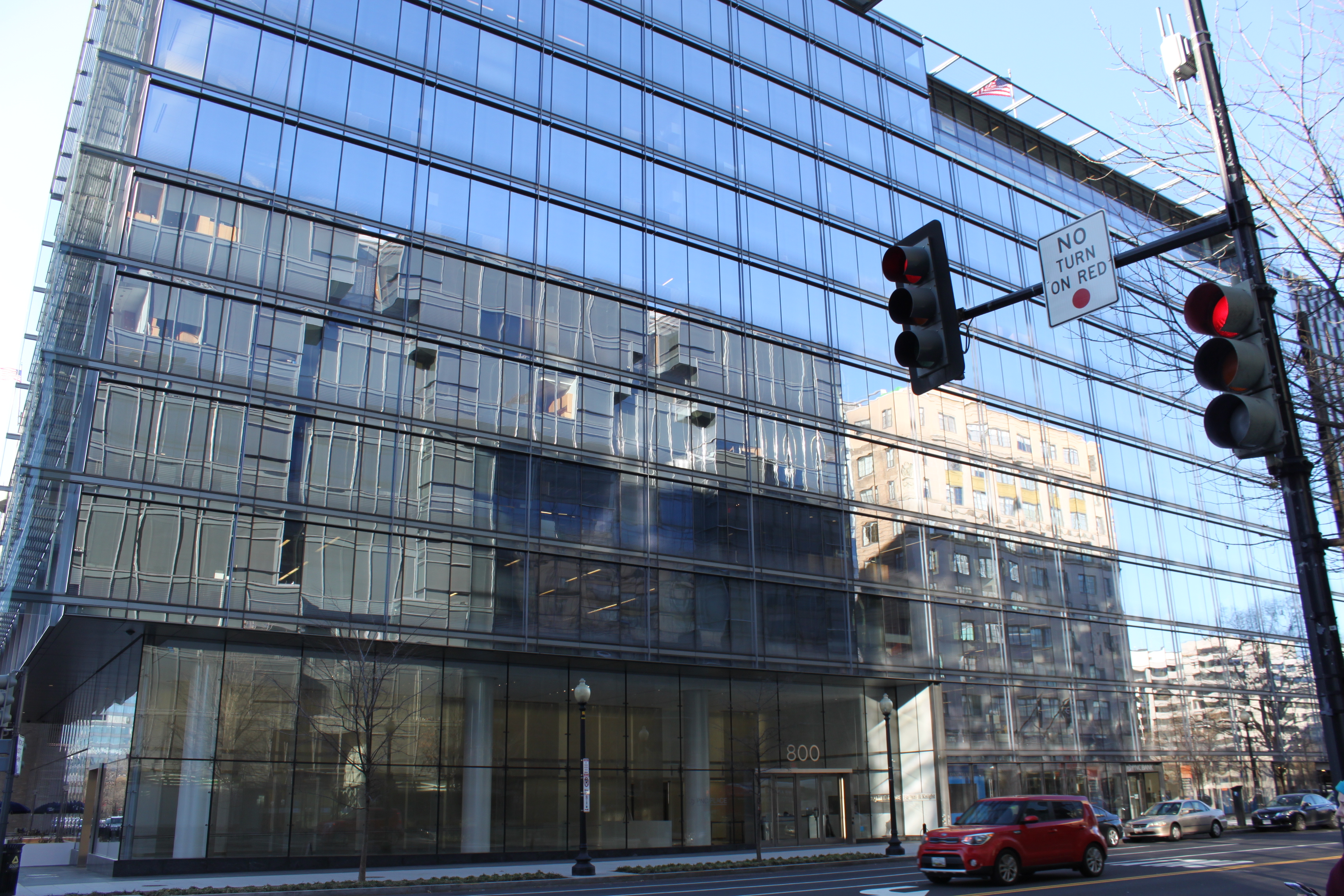
- PNC Bank Building in 2022
- Interactive map of the PNC Bank Building area

General information
- Type: Office
- Location: 800 17th St NW, Washington, D.C., U.S.
- Current tenants: PNC Financial Services
- Construction started: 2008
- Completed: 2010
- Opening: 2010

Height
- Roof: 150 feet (46 m)

Design and construction
- Architect: Gensler
- Developer: PNC/Vornado

PNC Bank Building is a high-rise skyscraper building located at 800 17th Street NW, Washington, D.C., United States. The building broke ground in 2008, and was completed in 2010. The building serves as an office building for PNC Financial Services, and serves as the regional headquarters for PNC Financial Services. The building is 150 feet (46 m), containing 12 floors. The architect of the building is Gensler, who designed the postmodern design of the building. The developer of the building is PNC/Vornado.

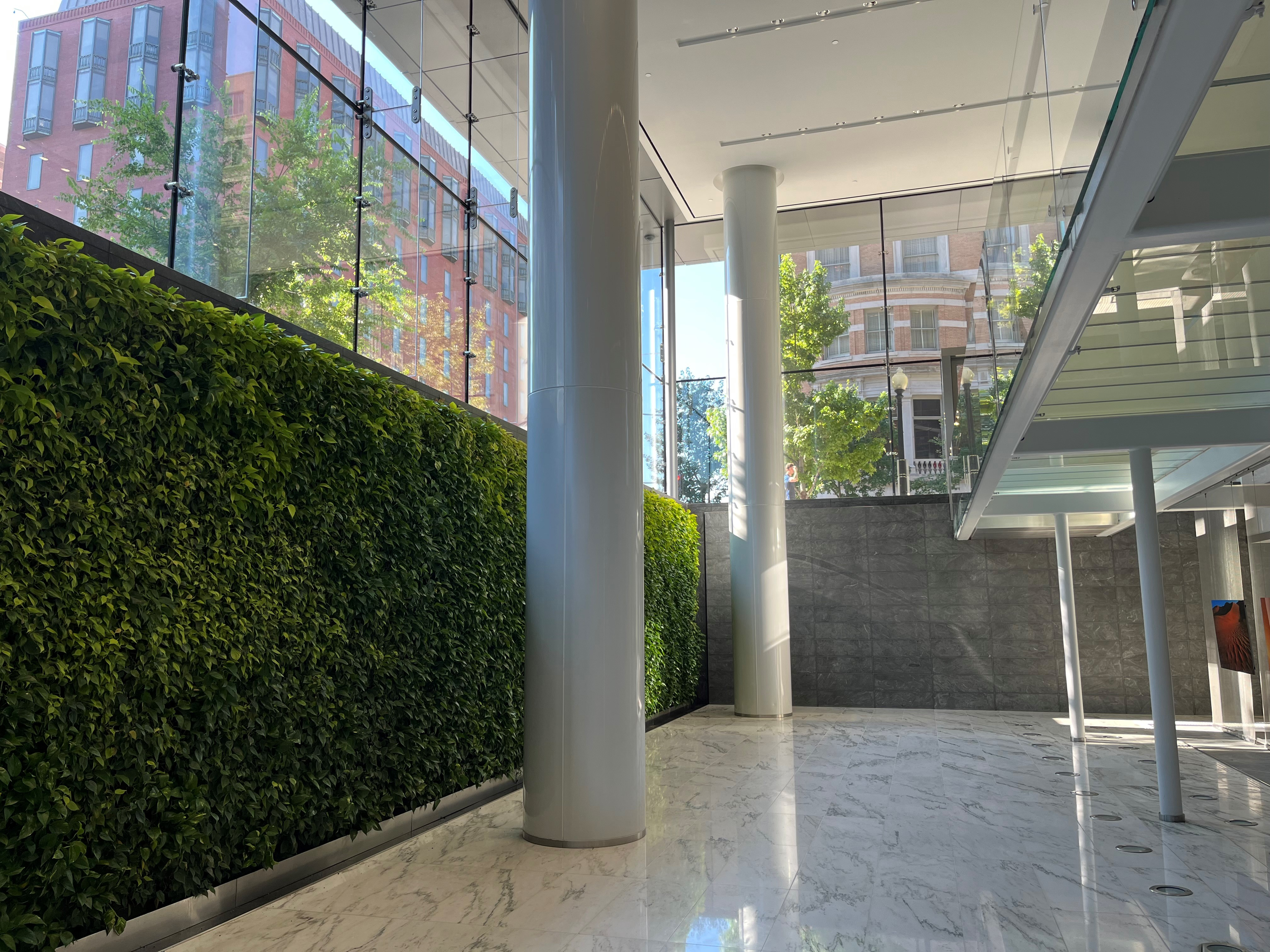
Lower level atrium

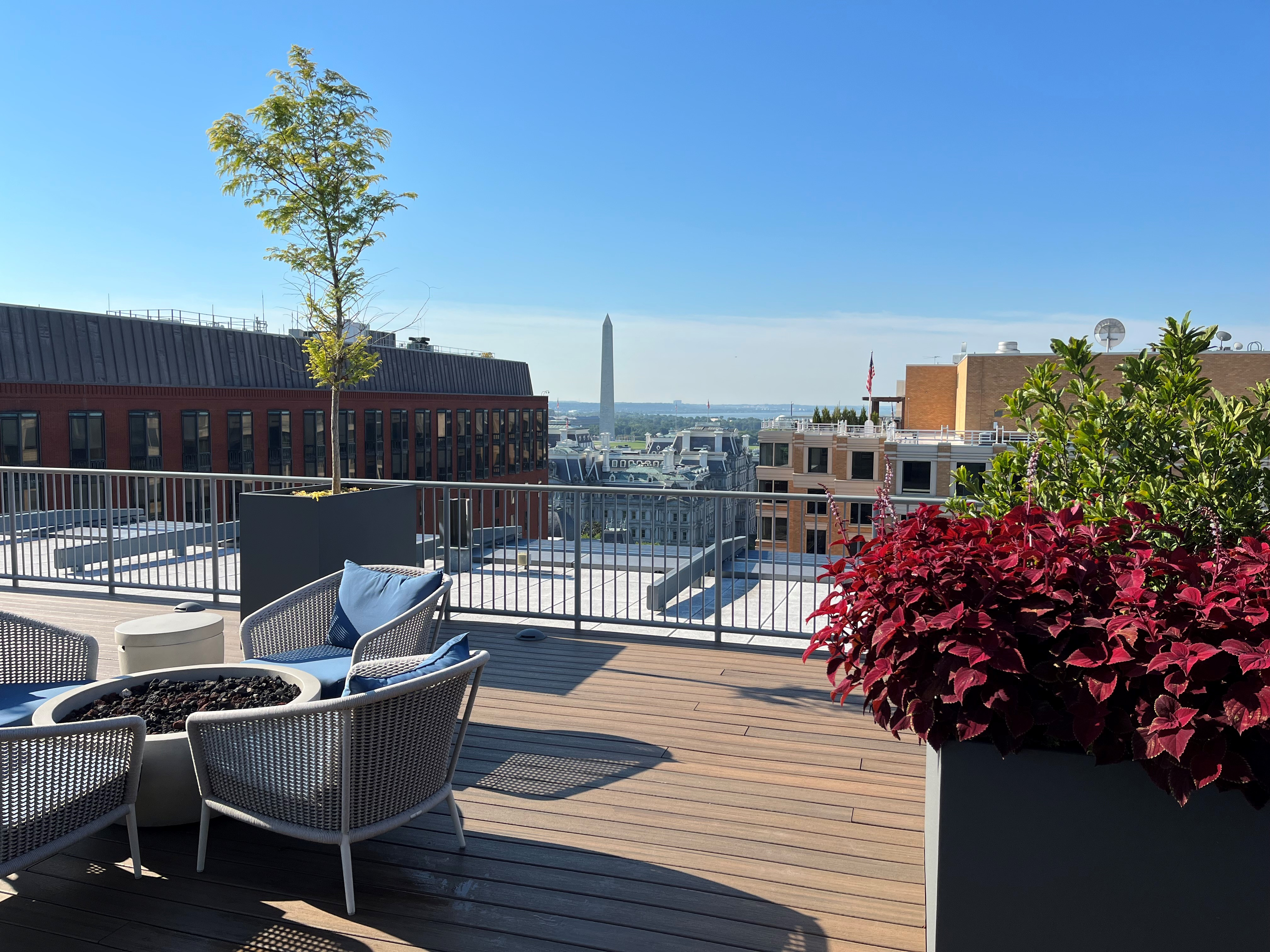
Rooftop terrace

== See also ==
- List of tallest buildings in Washington, D.C.
