= One Franklin Square =

High-rise building in Washington, D.C.

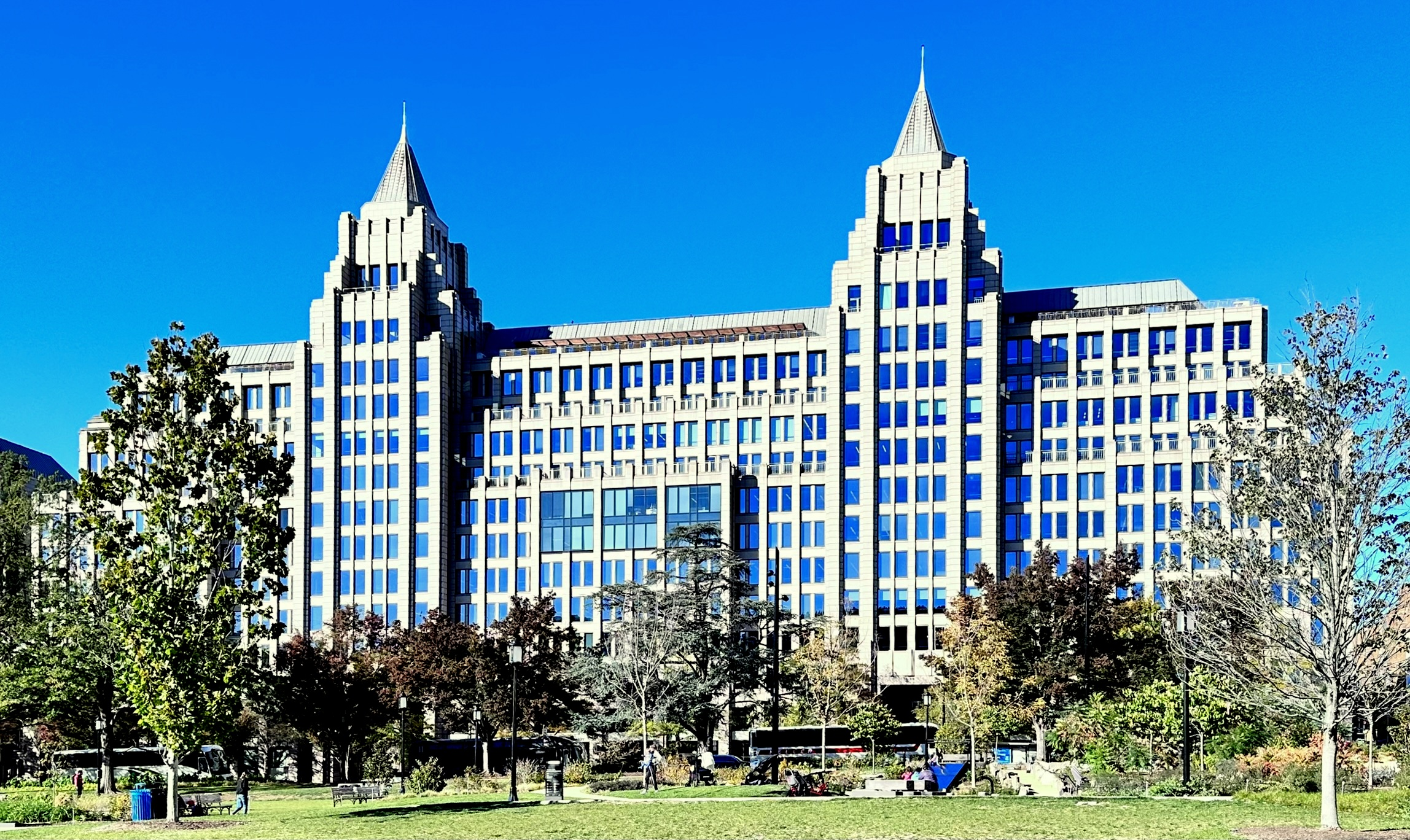
- One Franklin Square in 2023

General information
- Type: Commercial offices
- Location: 1301 K Street NW; Washington D.C. United States
- Coordinates: 38.90281°N 77.03051°W
- Construction started: 1989
- Completed: 1990
- Owner: Hines Interests Limited Partnership
- Operator: Hines Interests Limited Partnership

Height
- Roof: 210 ft (64 m)
- Top floor: 130 ft (39.6 m)

Technical details
- Floor count: 12; 4 basements
- Floor area: 591,840 sq ft (54,984 m^{2})
- Lifts/elevators: 16

Design and construction
- Architects: Hartman-Cox Architects; The Dewberry Companies
- Developer: Prentiss Company

Website
- www.onefranklinsquare.com

One Franklin Square is a high-rise building at 1301 K Street NW, in Downtown Washington, D.C., United States.

== Description ==
The 210 ft (64 m), 12-story building was completed in 1990, and is the tallest commercial building and fifth-tallest building in the District. It occupies almost the entire north side of the 1300 block of K Street NW across from Franklin Square.

The building is 130 feet (40 m) tall, complying with the city's height restrictions, but with two hexagonal, gold-tipped towers rising 90 feet (27 m) higher. Following the building's completion, Benjamin Forgey, architectural critic for The Washington Post wrote, "No new structure in Washington is so visible from so far or from so many different points of view as One Franklin Square." The construction of the building required the demolition, rebuilding and restoration of the Almas Temple, to the building's west.

The building is owned and managed by Hines Interests. It was developed by Prentiss Company and designed by Hartman-Cox Architects and The Dewberry Companies.

== Occupants ==
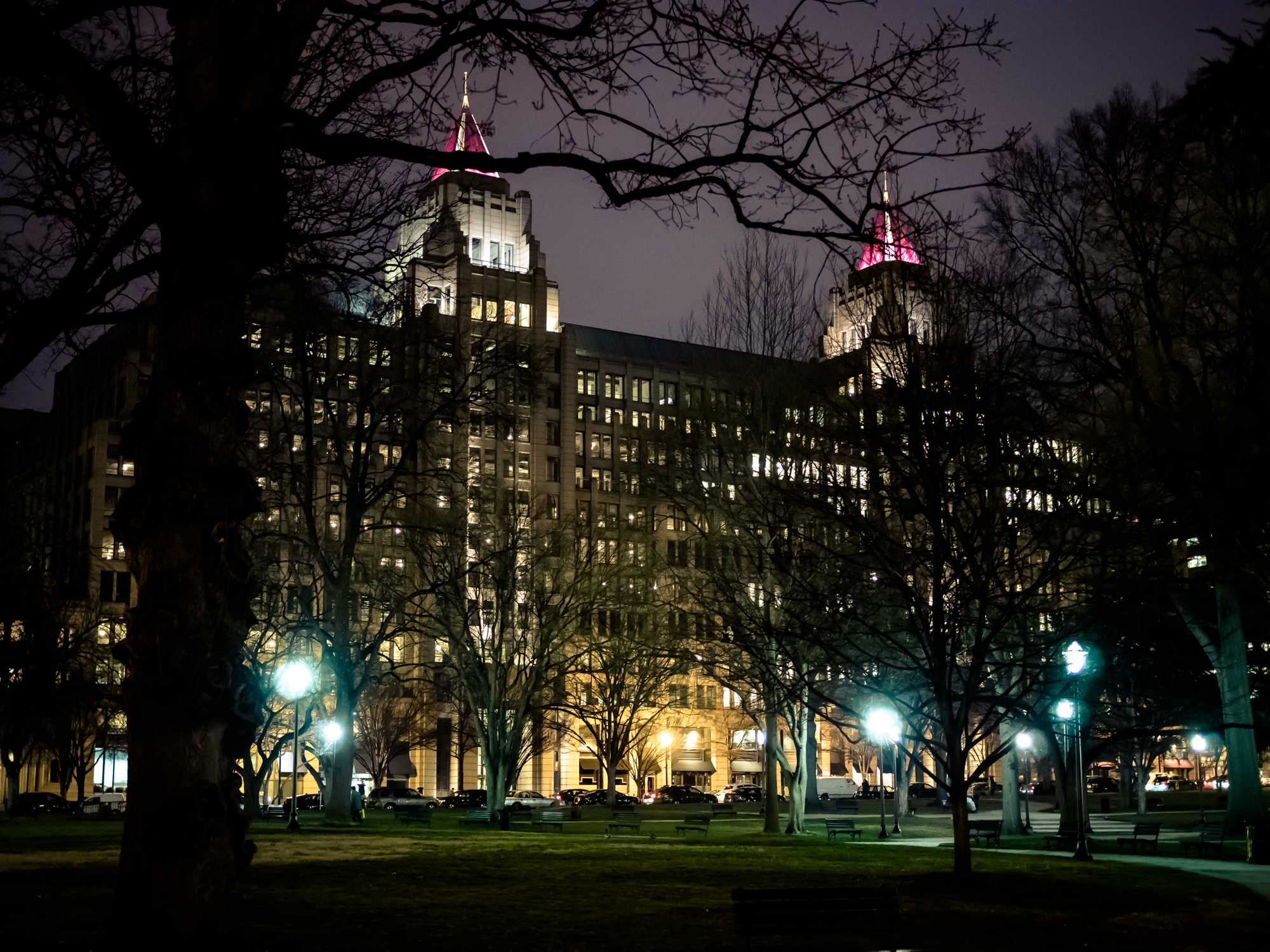
The building at night

=== IBM ===
When the building opened in 1991, the chief tenant was IBM.

=== The Washington Post ===
The Washington Post moved its headquarters there in late 2015. The company leased 242,000 square feet (22,500 m^{2}) of space for 16 years on floors four through nine in the west tower and floors seven and eight in the east tower. Hines agreed to an extensive build-out. Only about 10 percent of the space is private offices, which required extensive demolition of interior walls and the removal of the walls on the seventh and eighth floor in the east tower so they joined with the floors on the west tower. The newly joined space created two 60,000-square-foot (5,600 m^{2}) floors capable of accommodating 700 newsroom workers and software engineers. The build-out also constructed four sets for live television filming, a new staircase between the seventh and eighth floors in each tower, and a two-story auditorium on the fourth floor. Hines also agreed to alter the building's south-facing facade to give Post workers floor-to-ceiling windows. A large sign on the west tower displays a The Washington Post logo.

== In popular culture ==
One Franklin Square is an important setting in the final act of the 2009 Dan Brown novel, The Lost Symbol.

== See also ==
- List of tallest buildings in Washington, D.C.
