= 1875 K Street =

Coordinates: 38.9028°N 77.0429°W

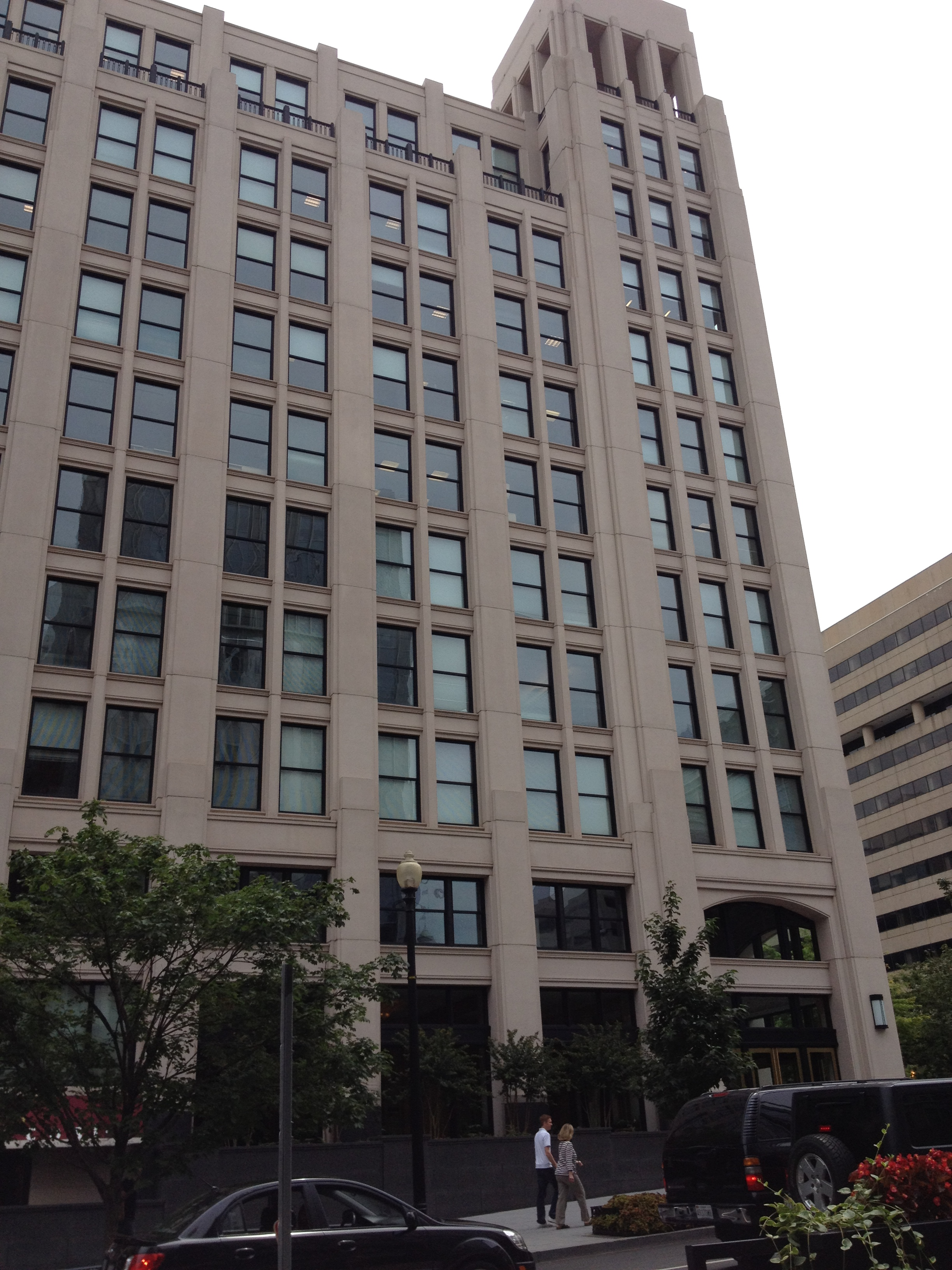
- 1875 K Street in 2012
- Interactive map of the 1875 K Street area

General information
- Type: Office
- Location: Washington, D.C., United States
- Construction started: 2000
- Completed: 2001
- Owner: Carr

Height
- Roof: 155 feet (47 m)

Technical details
- Floor count: 12
- Lifts/elevators: 5

Design and construction
- Architect: Hartman-Cox Architects

1875 K Street is a mid-rise office building located in the United States capital of Washington, D.C. The building began construction in 2000, and was completed in 2001. Upon completion, the building rose to 155 feet (47 m), featuring 12 floors and 5 elevators. The architect of the building was Hartman-Cox Architects, who designed the postmodern design of the building. The building was sold to Shorenstein Properties in 2005 for $113 million.

Law firm Willkie Farr & Gallagher is the anchor tenant in the building. Foley Hoag also has its Washington office in this building, There also was a Così restaurant located in the building, which was replaced by a Protein Bar in 2014.

== See also ==
- List of tallest buildings in Washington, D.C.
