= Shalom Baranes Associates =

Architectural design firm in Washington, D.C., US

- Industry: Architectural design
- Founded: 1981
- Founder: Shalom Baranes, FAIA
- Headquarters: Washington, D.C., United States
- Area served: Regional
- Website: sbaranes.com

Shalom Baranes Associates, PC is an architectural design firm in Washington, D.C., United States. It was founded by architect Shalom Baranes in 1981.

== History ==
Shalom Baranes Associates (SBA) was founded in 1981 by Shalom Baranes.

The firm was picked in 2010 as the architect of record for Waterfront Station, a $140 million, two-building mixed-use complex atop the Waterfront Washington Metro station.

Shalom Baranes Associates won the American Institute of Architects' Institute Honor Award for Regional and Urban Design for their design for Burnham Place, a $7 billion development of the air rights over the Amtrak and CSX railway tracks behind the Washington Union Station railway terminal.

The firm is also the architect for two apartment buildings which are part of the $1 billion CityCenterDC development. SBA also assisted with the master plan for the development.

On December 4, 2025, it was announced that Shalom Baranes had been selected by President Donald Trump to pick up the design of the new White House State Ballroom that will replace the demolished East Wing of the White House complex.

== Bibliography ==
- Cramer, James P.; Yankopolus, Jennifer Evans (2006). Almanac of Architecture and Design, 2006. Atlanta: Greenway Group. ISBN 0975565427.
