= Union Freight Railroad =

Defunct railroad in Massachusetts

Approximate routing of the Union Freight Railroad

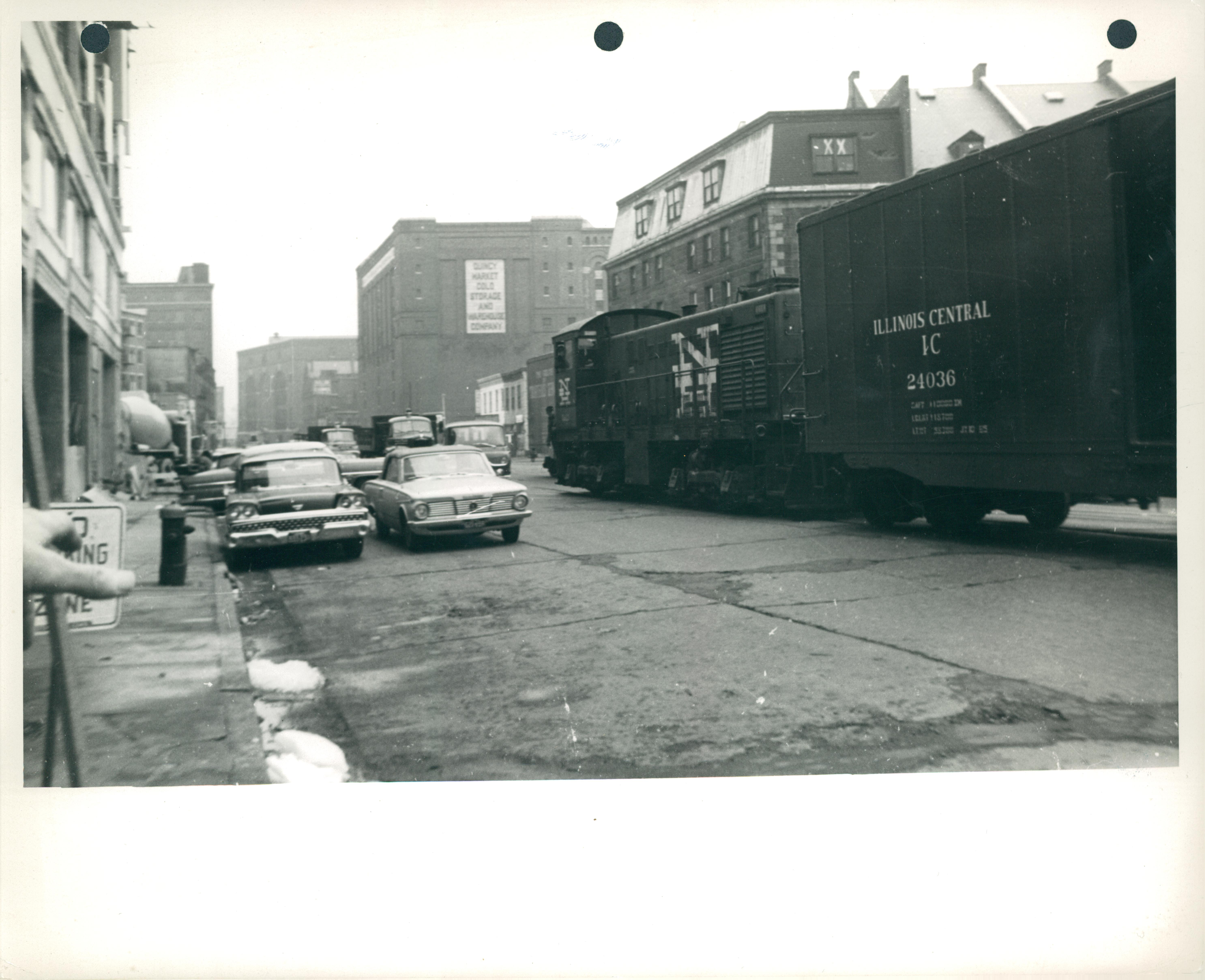
Union Freight Railroad locomotive hauling an Illinois Central boxcar on Atlantic Avenue, ca. 1964

The Union Freight Railroad was a freight-only railroad connecting the railroads coming into the north and south sides of downtown Boston, Massachusetts. Almost its entire length was along Atlantic Avenue and Commercial Street. For most of its length, the Atlantic Avenue Elevated carried passengers above.

== Original configuration ==
When the line was built in 1872, each railroad had separate tracks and a separate terminal; the current union stations at North Station and South Station had not yet been built. At first, only four connections were provided.

The first connection was from the Old Colony Railroad, the line to Quincy and beyond. That line crossed the Fort Point Channel a bit west of the Northern Avenue Bridge, ending with passenger and freight terminals southwest of the current location of South Station (fully south of Kneeland Street). The beginning of the Union Freight Railroad split off the Old Colony Railroad between the bridge and the terminals, heading northeast to Federal Street and then north on Federal Street, a street that ran from the Dorchester Avenue Bridge straight to Dewey Square (the front of South Station).

Continuing north, about 1/3 of the way between Essex Street and Dewey Square, the line was met with a track from the New York and New England Railroad (now the Fairmount Line). This line came over the Fort Point Channel into South Boston (where the South Boston Bypass Road runs now) and back over the channel just south of where the Summer Street Bridge is now, with a passenger depot east of Dewey Square (roughly where the north end of South Station now lies). Freight facilities were in South Boston, where the South Boston Freight Terminal still operates; the Federal Street Freight Depot was later built on the downtown side. The Union Freight Railroad connection split south from the line to the passenger depot just after crossing Fort Point Channel, and ran west to merge with the main line on Federal Street.

At Dewey Square, the Union Freight Railroad continued north on Atlantic Avenue. Various track connections were provided to markets and docks on Boston Harbor. On the east side of the North End, the line merged onto Commercial Street, and turned west and continued along Causeway Street.

Halfway between Beverly Street and Haverhill Street, the line curved off Causeway Street to head north between the passenger terminal of the Fitchburg Railroad and the northern freight house of the Boston and Maine Railroad, roughly between the current North Station and Central Artery. This track then split in two, with the east branch merging with the Fitchburg Railroad and the west branch merging with the Boston and Maine Railroad.

No connections were provided to the Boston and Albany Railroad (which ended near today's South Station), Boston and Providence Railroad (which ended in Park Square), or the Eastern Railroad and Boston and Lowell Railroad (which both ended near today's North Station). Additionally, the Boston and Albany Railroad and Eastern Railroad had lines to East Boston, across Boston Harbor from downtown.

== New union stations ==
The original North Station opened in 1894, lying just west of the old Boston and Maine Railroad northern freight house. The existing connections were kept. A new connection was built between the Union Freight Railroad and the Fitchburg Railroad, east of the old Fitchburg Railroad passenger terminal. Additionally, the track was extended west on Causeway Street to Lowell Street, where it turned north, merging with the original alignment of the Boston and Lowell Railroad and its bridge over the Charles River. This was later simplified, with only the original connection to the Boston and Maine Railroad and the new west connection remaining.

South Station opened in 1899, with the Boston and Providence Railroad and New York and New England Railroad being realigned next to the Boston and Albany Railroad and Old Colony Railroad to access it. The old connection between the Union Freight Railroad and the New York and New England Railroad was removed. Federal Street was removed, as it was in the way of the new station, and the Union Freight Railroad was realigned onto Atlantic Avenue south of Dewey Square. At Kneeland Street, Atlantic Avenue made an S-curve to the west, and the Union Freight Railroad continued straight, along the east side of Atlantic Avenue, and merging with the combined Boston and Albany Railroad and Boston and Providence Railroad after passing under the Atlantic Avenue Viaduct (which crossed the Fort Point Channel between the Dorchester Avenue Bridge and the railroad bridge). No direct connection was provided to the Old Colony Railroad or the New York and New England Railroad.

== Locomotives ==
From opening until 1953, UFRR owned its own locomotives. From 1953 until closure in 1970, UFRR leased locomotives from the parent New Haven Railroad.

Number	Builder	Type	Built	Withdrawn	Notes
1 (first)	Schenectady Locomotive Works	0-4-0T Steam dummy	1872	1923	Originally named Edward Thompson, renamed City of Boston in 1907.
2 (first)	Schenectady Locomotive Works	0-4-0T Steam dummy	1873	1924	
3 (first)	Schenectady Locomotive Works	0-4-0T Steam dummy	1874	1925	
4 (first)	Schenectady Locomotive Works	0-4-0T Steam dummy	1874	1928	
5 (first)	Schenectady Locomotive Works	0-4-0T Steam dummy	1870	1906	Built for South Side Railroad of Long Island. Purchased by UFRR in 1878.
5 (second)	ALCO	0-4-0T Steam dummy	1907	1923	
6	ALCO	0-4-0T Steam dummy	1914	1923	
7	Climax Locomotive Works	Class C Climax	1922	1946	Shrouded with Boxcab body.
8	Climax Locomotive Works	Class C Climax	1923	1946	Shrouded with Boxcab body.
9	Climax Locomotive Works	Class C Climax	1924	1946	Shrouded with Boxcab body.
10	Climax Locomotive Works	Class C Climax	1928	1946	Shrouded with Boxcab body.
1 (second)	General Electric	44-ton switcher	1946	1953	Fitted for multiple-unit train control. Sold to Dolese & Shepard Co.
2 (second)	General Electric	44-ton switcher	1946	1953	Fitted for multiple-unit train control. Sold to Vulcan Materials Company.
3 (second)	General Electric	44-ton switcher	1946	1953	
4 (second)	General Electric	44-ton switcher	1946	1953	
5 (third)	General Electric	44-ton switcher	1946	1953	Sold to Vulcan Materials Company.
0600	ALCO	S2	1943	1970	Leased from NH from 1953 to 1970.
0603	ALCO	S2	1943	1970	Leased from NH from 1953 to 1970.

In addition, the prototype ALCO boxcab #8835 was tested in November 1924 but UFRR decided not to purchase the type.

== Later years ==
The connection with the New Haven Railroad was severed on September 9, 1969. All remaining operations ceased on March 5, 1970.

== See also ==
- Albany Street Freight Railway, which continued south on Albany Street

== Other reading ==
- Various Sanborn maps
- Ronald Dale Karr, The Rail Lines of Southern New England: A Handbook of Railroad History, Branch Line Press, ISBN 0-942147-02-2
- Frank Kyper, The railroad that came out at night: a book of railroading in and around Boston, Stephen Greene Press, ISBN 0828903182.
