= Dorchester Avenue (Boston) =

Street in Boston, Massachusetts

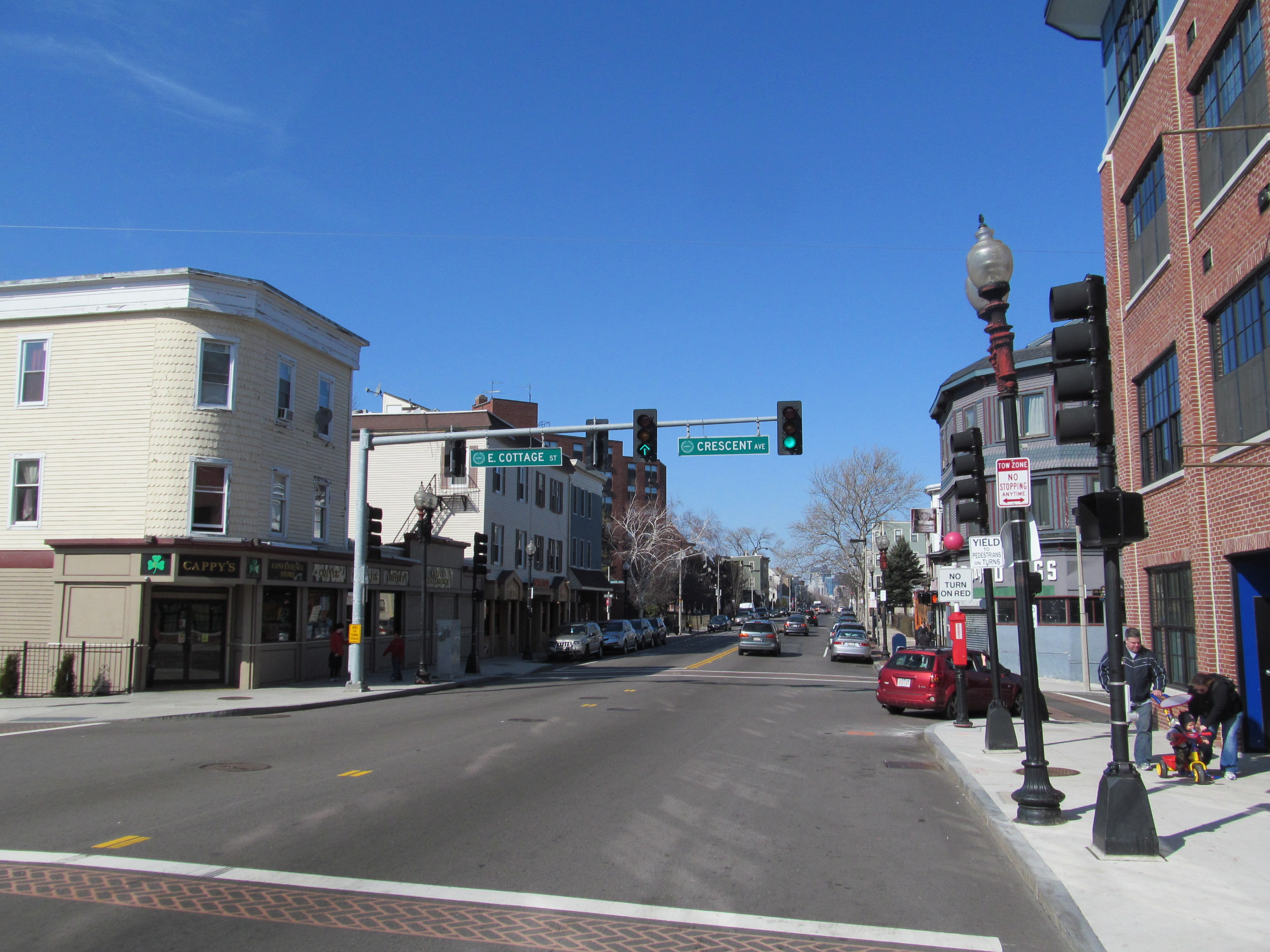
- In Dorchester
- Length: 5.65 mi (9.09 km)
- Location: Boston
- South end: Adams Street / Washington Street
- North end: Congress Street

Dorchester Avenue (sometimes called Dot Ave) is a street in Boston, Massachusetts, running from downtown south via South Boston and Dorchester to the border with Milton, where it ends. Built as a turnpike, the Dorchester Turnpike, it is mostly straight.

== History ==
The Boston South Bridge over Fort Point Channel, on the site of today's West Fourth Street Bridge, opened on October 1, 1805 as the first bridge connecting downtown to South Boston. Until it was sold to the city of Boston on April 19, 1832, it was a toll bridge.

The Dorchester Turnpike Corporation (sometimes called the South Boston Turnpike) was created by the state legislature on March 4, 1805, to build a turnpike from the east end of the Boston South Bridge (Nook Point) to Milton Bridge over the Neponset River, on the other side of which the Blue Hill Turnpike later continued.

Construction cost more than expected, and thus high tolls were charged, so many travelers took the old longer route through Roxbury. Despite that, the Dorchester Turnpike was one of the most profitable turnpikes, with earnings steadily climbing to a peak in 1838. When the parallel Old Colony Railroad opened in 1844, earnings quickly fell.

The North Free Bridge, on the site of today's Dorchester Avenue Bridge, opened in 1826, providing a more direct route form the north end of the turnpike to Dewey Square downtown.

On April 22, 1854, the turnpike became a free public road, named Dorchester Avenue. The name was changed to Federal Street in 1856, as it provided a continuation of that street from downtown Boston (via the North Free Bridge), but it became Dorchester Avenue again in 1870.

As part of the building of South Station (opened 1899), Federal Street was cut between the bridge and Dewey Square. Dorchester Avenue was extended north from the bridge around the east side of the new union station, along the shore of the Fort Point Channel, intersecting Mount Washington Avenue (which was also cut by the new station) and Summer Street and ending at Congress Street. Additionally, the Atlantic Avenue Viaduct was built as a second bridge just west of the Dorchester Avenue Bridge, connecting to Atlantic Avenue at Dewey Square.

By 1923 the viaduct was gone, but the extension of Dorchester Avenue remains to this day.

Regular Old Colony Railroad passenger service ended in 1959, after completion of the Southeast Expressway, and some of the tracks at South Station became disused. In the 1960s the United States Postal Service greatly expanded its South Station Postal Annex. The USPS purchased one block of Dorchester Avenue from the city, due to conflicts with its loading docks when it converted from rail to truck delivery.

In the 1990s it was closed to the public, including pedestrians and bicyclists, from the bridge to Summer Street, due to its proximity to Big Dig construction. It has remained closed due to security concerns, as it runs next to the South Postal Annex (a sorting facility of the United States Postal Service). In February 2022, Massachusetts Governor Charlie Baker announced that a $37 million project to replace the Dorchester Avenue bridge passing over the MBTA Red Line will be included in the $9.5 billion in federal funds the state government received under the Infrastructure Investment and Jobs Act.

== Public transportation ==
The Dorchester Avenue Railroad, one of the first street railways in Boston, started operations in 1857, eventually running over the full length (from downtown to the Neponset River). When the road was realigned around 1899, the tracks were moved, ending at a line along Summer Street.

As the Red Line opened in the 1910s and 1920s, parallel to Dorchester Avenue, most through passengers switched to that, and local routes were rerouted to feed into the new subway. Tracks were removed by the 1950s. Today the Red Line Ashmont branch is sometimes referred to as the Dorchester Avenue line.

Nowadays the only bus routes to use the road are local routes to subway stations:

Note: routes that use Dorchester Avenue for only a few blocks are not listed.

- 18 Ashmont—Andrew via Dorchester Avenue
- 27 Mattapan—Ashmont via River Street and Dorchester Avenue
- 217 Wollaston Beach—Ashmont via Adams, East Milton Square and Beale Street
- 240 Ashmont—Avon Square via Crawford Square Randolph

== Numbered routes ==
The first numbered routes in New England were the New England Interstate Highways in 1922. NE 6 may have used Dorchester Avenue south of South Boston, but it is more likely that it turned northwest towards Morton Street just after crossing the Neponset River. In any case, by 1927, Route 3 (which had replaced NE 6) and Route 28 turned northwest in Milton, on a route that Route 28 still uses. (By 1928, Route 3 had been realigned to use the new Southern Artery, now Gallivan Boulevard.)

Between 1933 and 1935, the C (city) routes through downtown Boston began to be signed. Route C37, a continuation of Route 37, used MDC Parkways (now Morrissey Boulevard), merging with Dorchester Avenue at Old Colony Avenue. From there C37 took Dorchester Avenue to its north end, Congress Street, turning northwest there into downtown. A one-way pair existed from West Fourth Street to the Fort Point Channel, with southbound traffic using Foundry Street and West Fourth Street, but this was later removed, with Dorchester Avenue returning to full two-way operation.

Route C37 was decommissioned circa 1959 when Route 37 was truncated to Braintree (interchange with former-Route 128/current I-93/US 1) following the completion of the Southeast Expressway (current I-93/US 1/Route 3) leaving Dorchester Avenue with no numbered routes. Thus, over the years, the only route to use the road has probably been C37.

The rest of the C routes would be decommissioned circa 1970-1971.

Browse numbered routes
← Route 37	MA	→ Route 38
