= Occupy Boston =

2011 protest movement

- Part of the Occupy movement
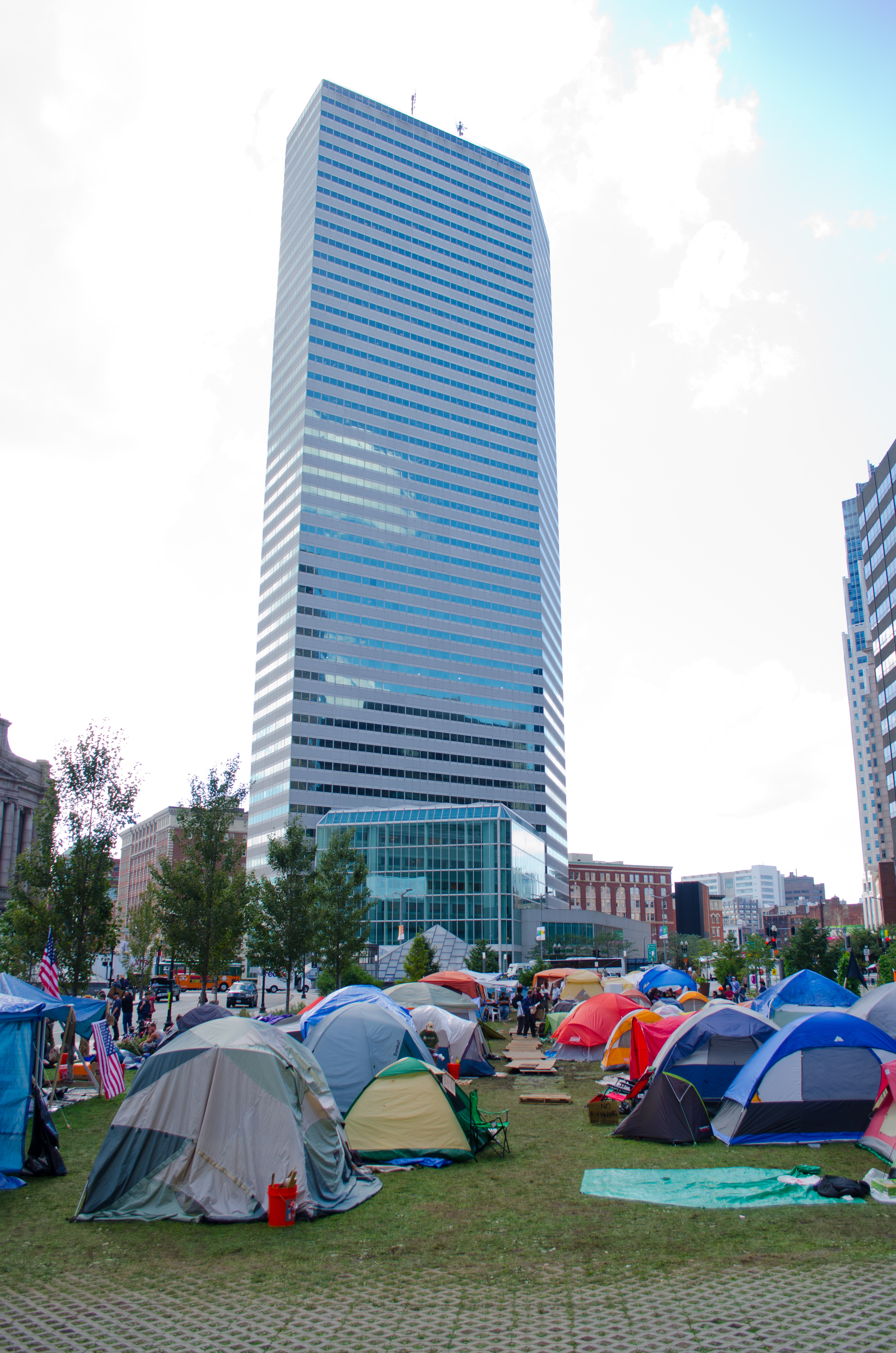
- People gathered near Boston's Dewey Square during Occupy Boston on October 3, 2011
- Date: September 30, 2011 – December 10, 2011 (70-1/2 days)
- Location: Boston, Massachusetts; 42.3528°N 71.0555°W
- Caused by: Economic Inequality, Democracy, Racism, Sexism, inter alia
- Goals: Freedom, social justice, democracy, building a beloved community
- Methods: Demonstration, occupation, protest, street protesters, Civil Disobedience, Direct Action
- Status: Occupation ended

Arrests and injuries
- Injuries: 0
- Arrested: 186

Occupy Boston was a collective of protesters that settled on September 30, 2011 in Boston, Massachusetts, on Dewey Square in the Financial District opposite the Federal Reserve Bank of Boston. It is related to the Occupy Wall Street movement that began in New York City on September 17, 2011.

As of June 2012, Occupy Boston had continued to engage in organized meetings, events and actions.

== Overview ==
On October 10, 2011, the Boston demonstrators expanded a tent city onto an additional portion of the Rose Kennedy Greenway; starting around 1:20 AM the following morning, 141 people were arrested by the officers of the Boston Police Special Operations Unit. Most of these cases were dismissed prior to arraignment with the agreement of the Suffolk County District Attorney's office. Tents were pitched in the following days, and by October 15 the camp itself had consisted of about 90 tents on either side of a path the protesters named, "Main Street," plus another two dozen or so tents divided up between the "Student Village" area and a strip of lawn the protesters named "Weird Street".

A tent library, later named the Audre Lorde to Howard Zinn (A to Z) Library was set up at the Occupy Boston encampment with the mission to "foster inquiry, learning, critical analysis and information-sharing among Occupy Boston occupiers, participants and visitors in order to better understand, challenge and transform interlocking systems of oppression".

Members of Occupy Boston marched with students at Harvard University on November 9, 2011, to create the Occupy Harvard in Harvard Yard. The two groups later collaborated to interrupt a Newt Gingrich speech at Harvard on November 18.

By November 17, 2011 a judge issued an order prohibiting the eviction of protesters from Occupy Boston. On December 7, 2011 a Boston judge rescinded the temporary restraining order, allowing Boston Mayor Thomas Menino to remove the protesters from Dewey Square. At 5:00 AM on December 10, 2011, Boston police moved in and raided the Occupation of Dewey Square, with 46 people arrested.

Police officers collected $1.4 million dollars in overtime from the city of Boston.

== The Boston Occupier ==
The Boston Occupier
- Circulation: 25,000
- Website: bostonoccupier.com

The Boston Occupier was an independent newspaper that was born out of the Occupy Boston movement. The title was originally The Occupy Boston Globe, but was changed shortly before the first publication in order to avoid association with the Boston Globe.

The newspaper launched in October 2011, with the first issue being released on November 18, 2011 with a run of 25,000 copies. The paper was funded with donations from a Kickstarter campaign, which raised approximately $9,300 in donations.

== Images ==
Video of Occupiers "mic checking" Newt Gingrich as he begins to speak

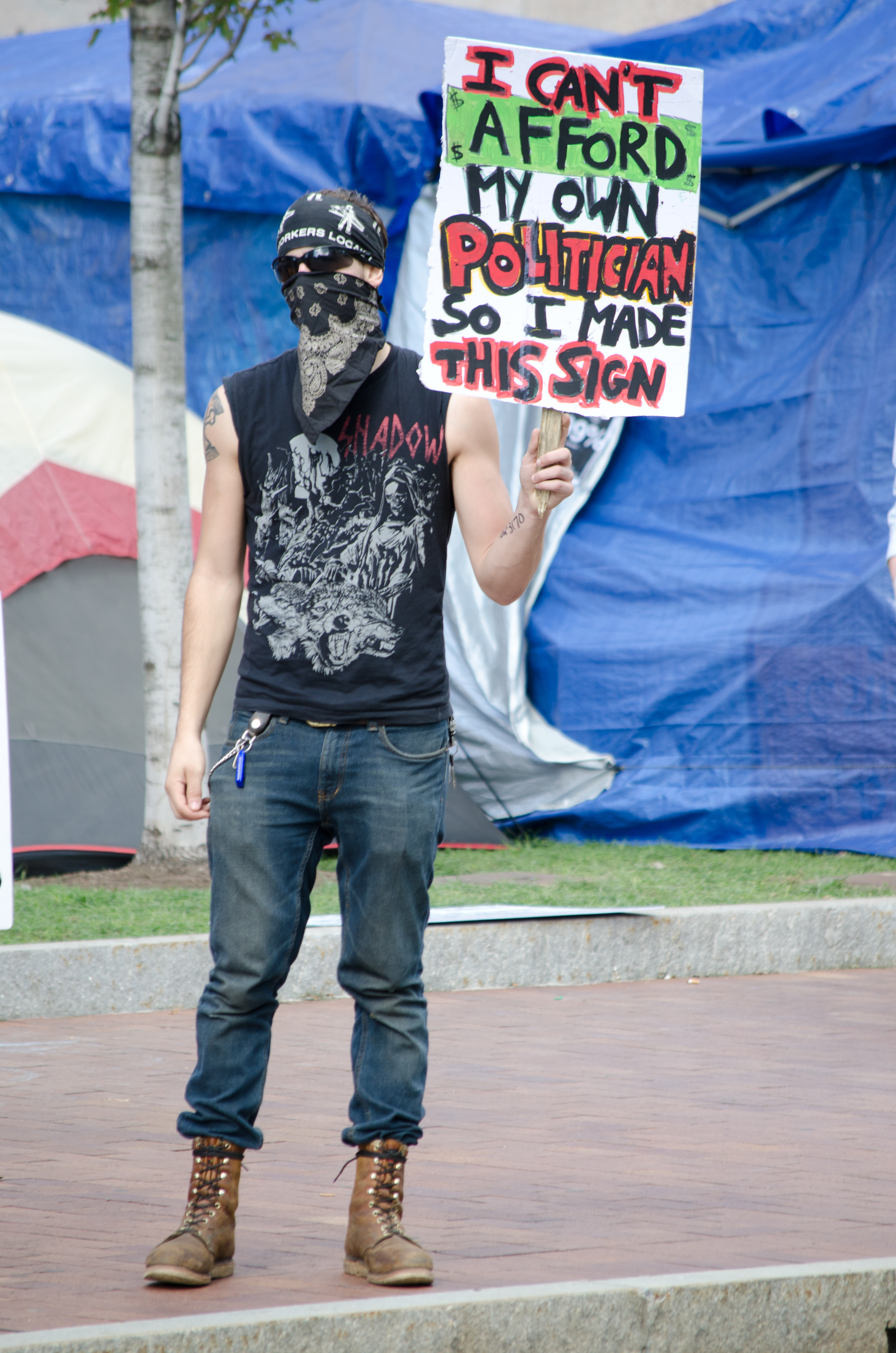
October 3, 2011

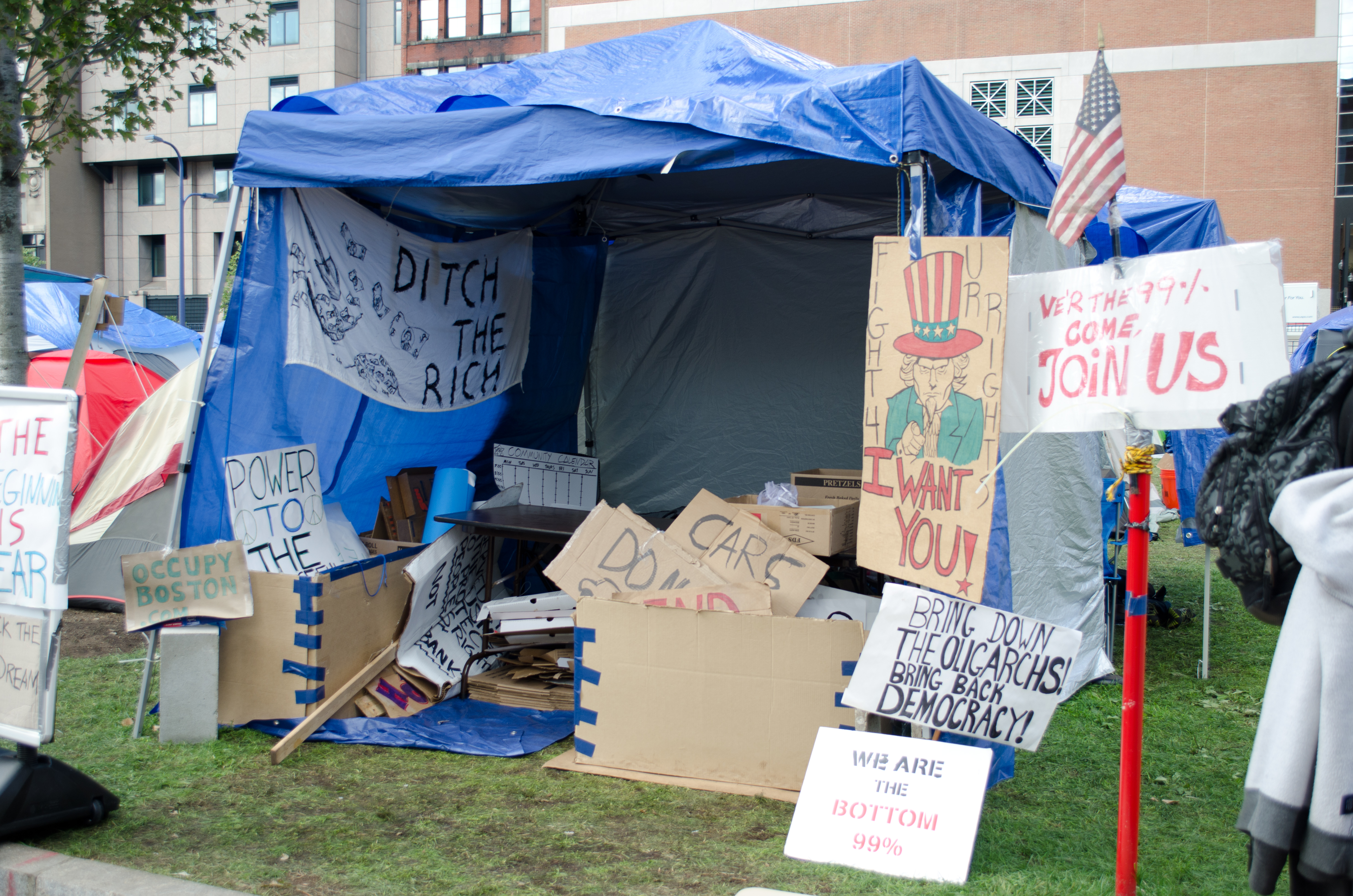
Sign tent, October 3, 2011

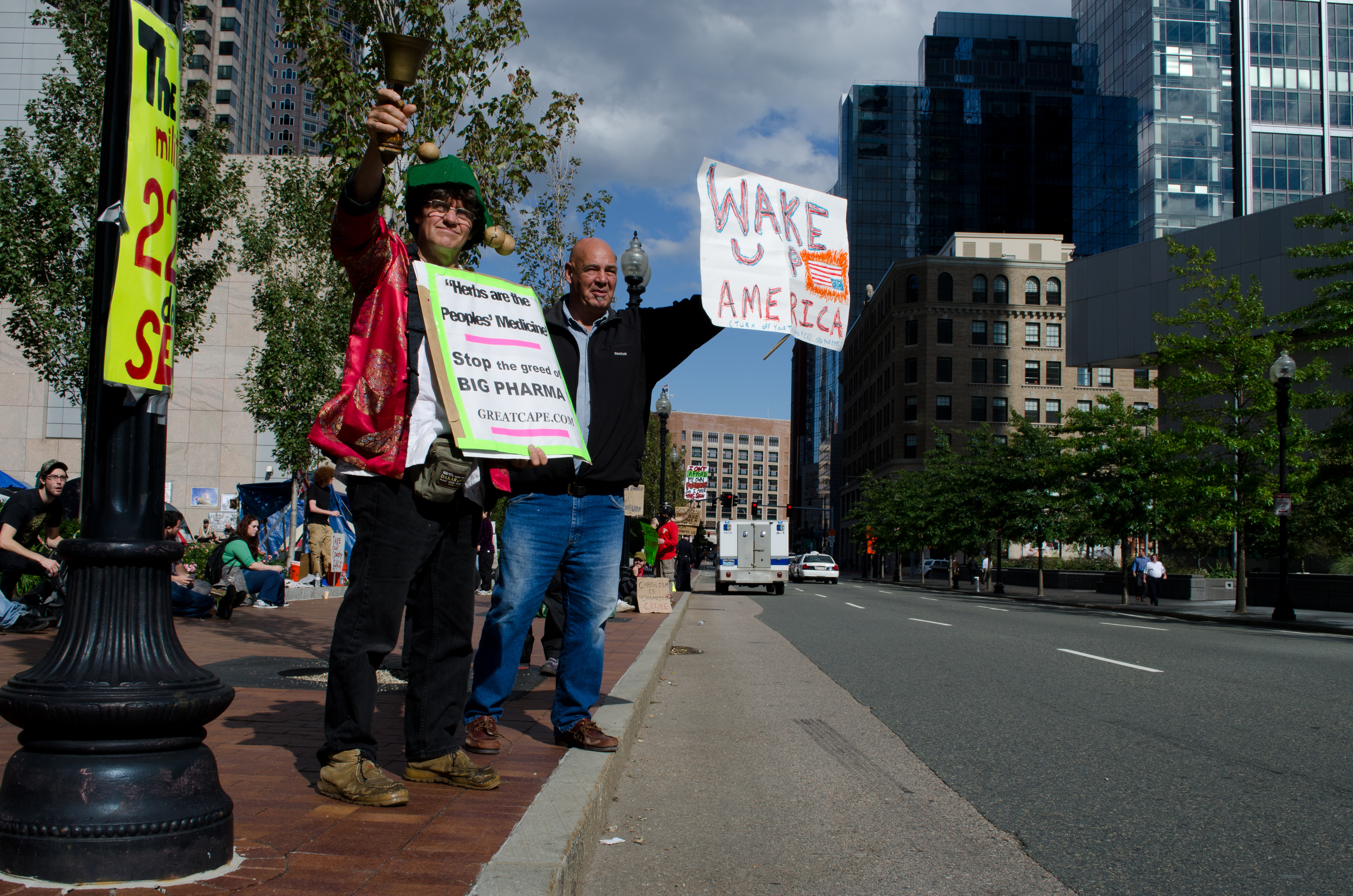
Atlantic Ave., October 3, 2011

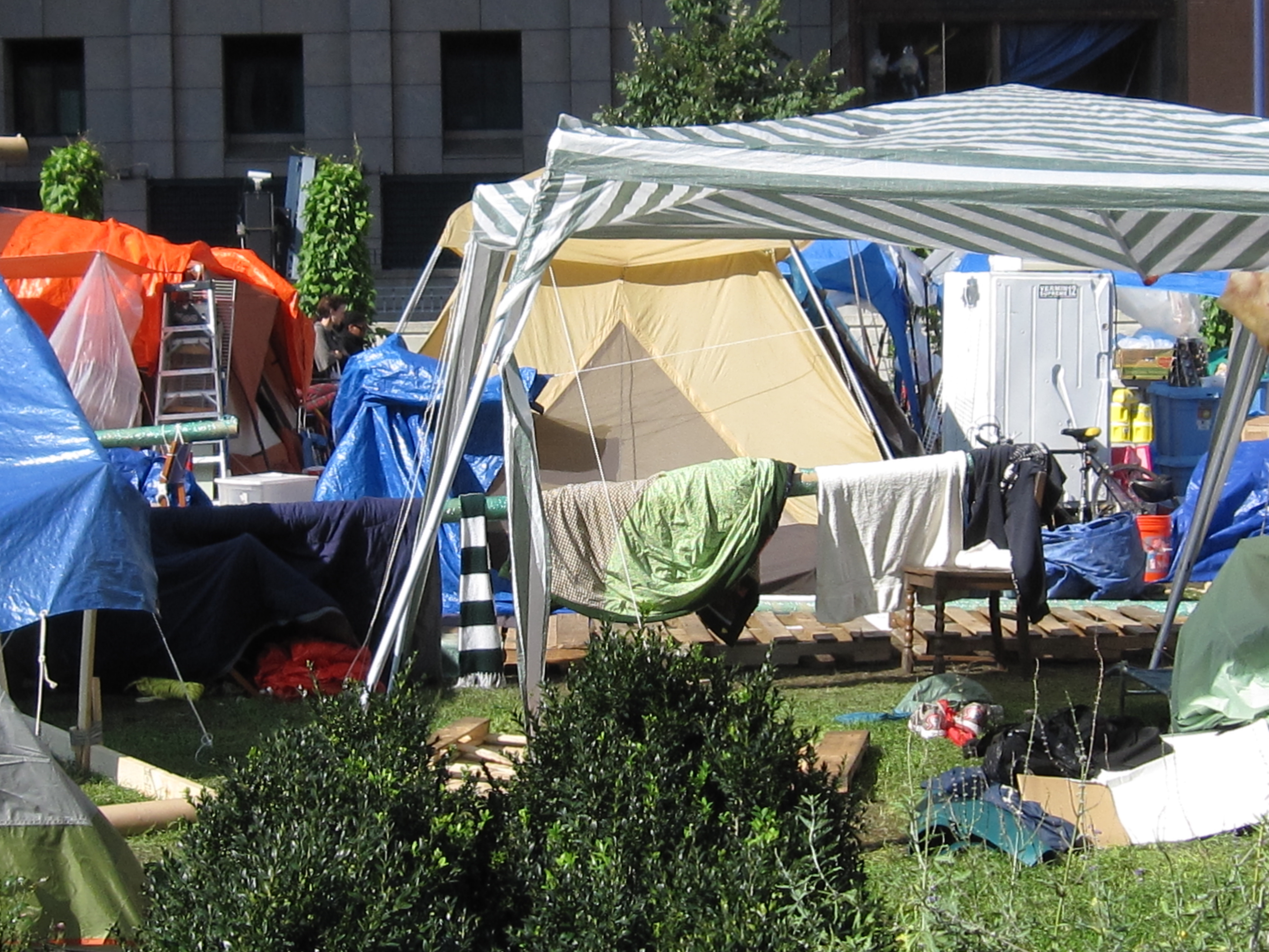
October 6, 2011

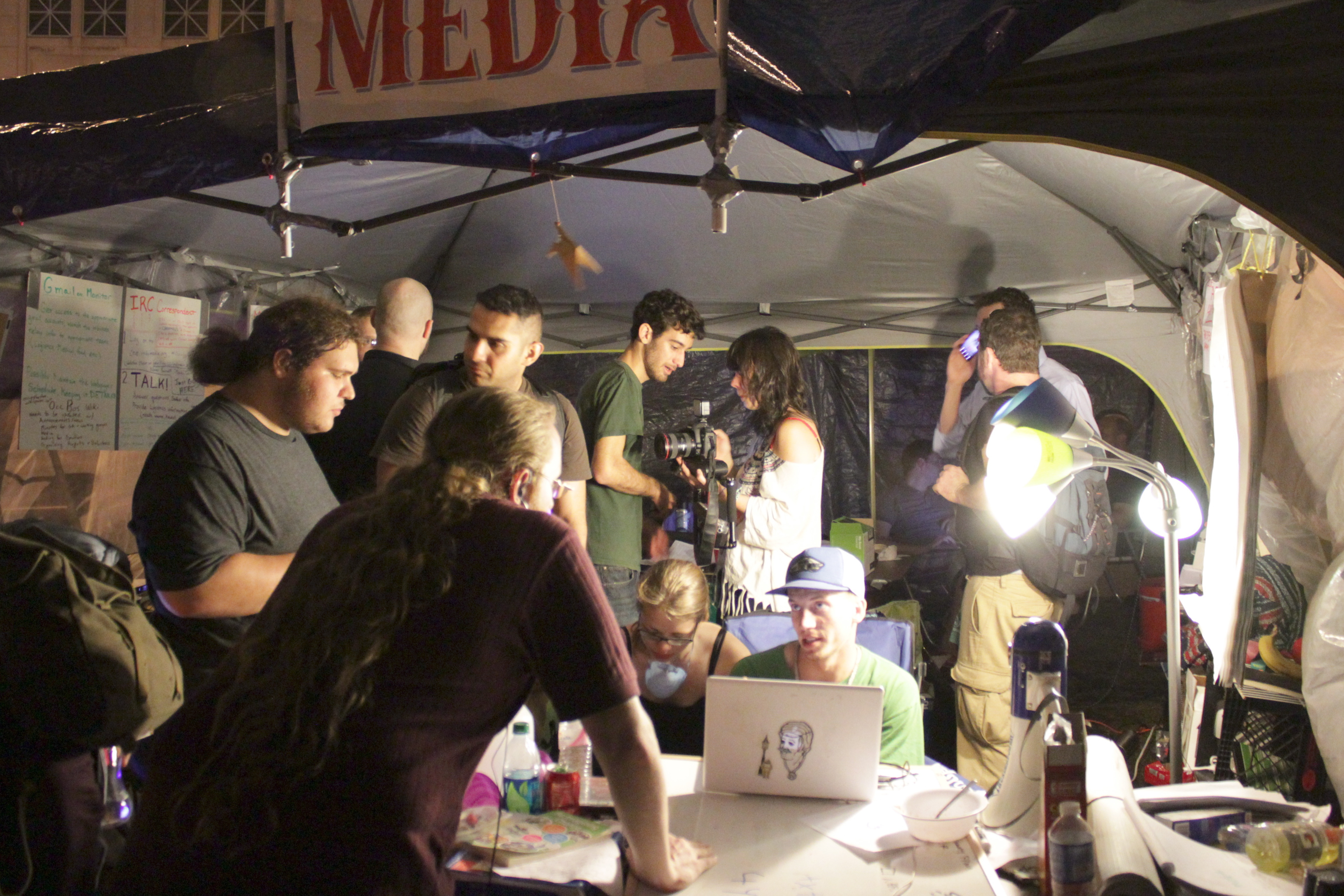
Media tent, October 10, 2011

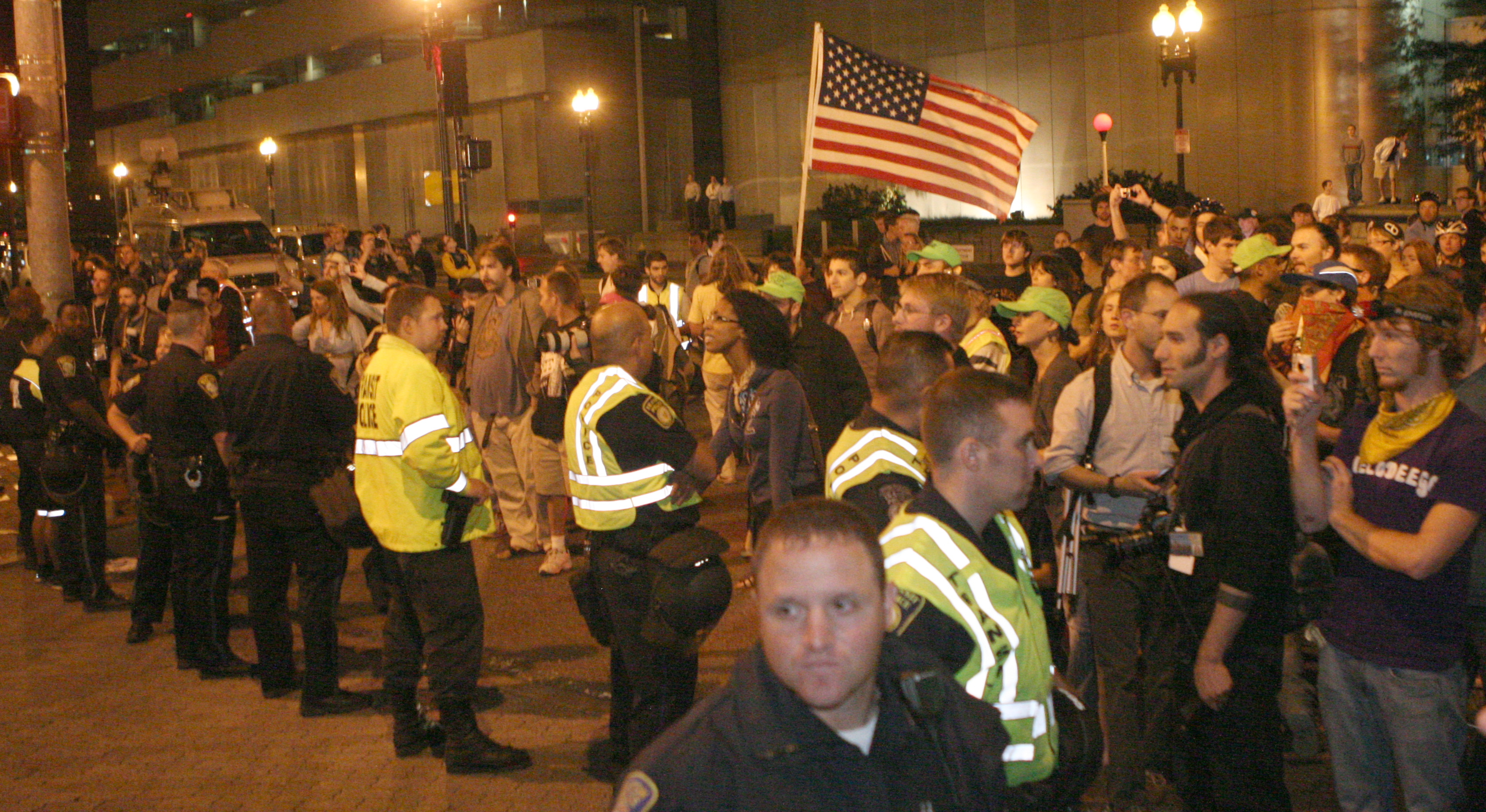
October 10, 2011

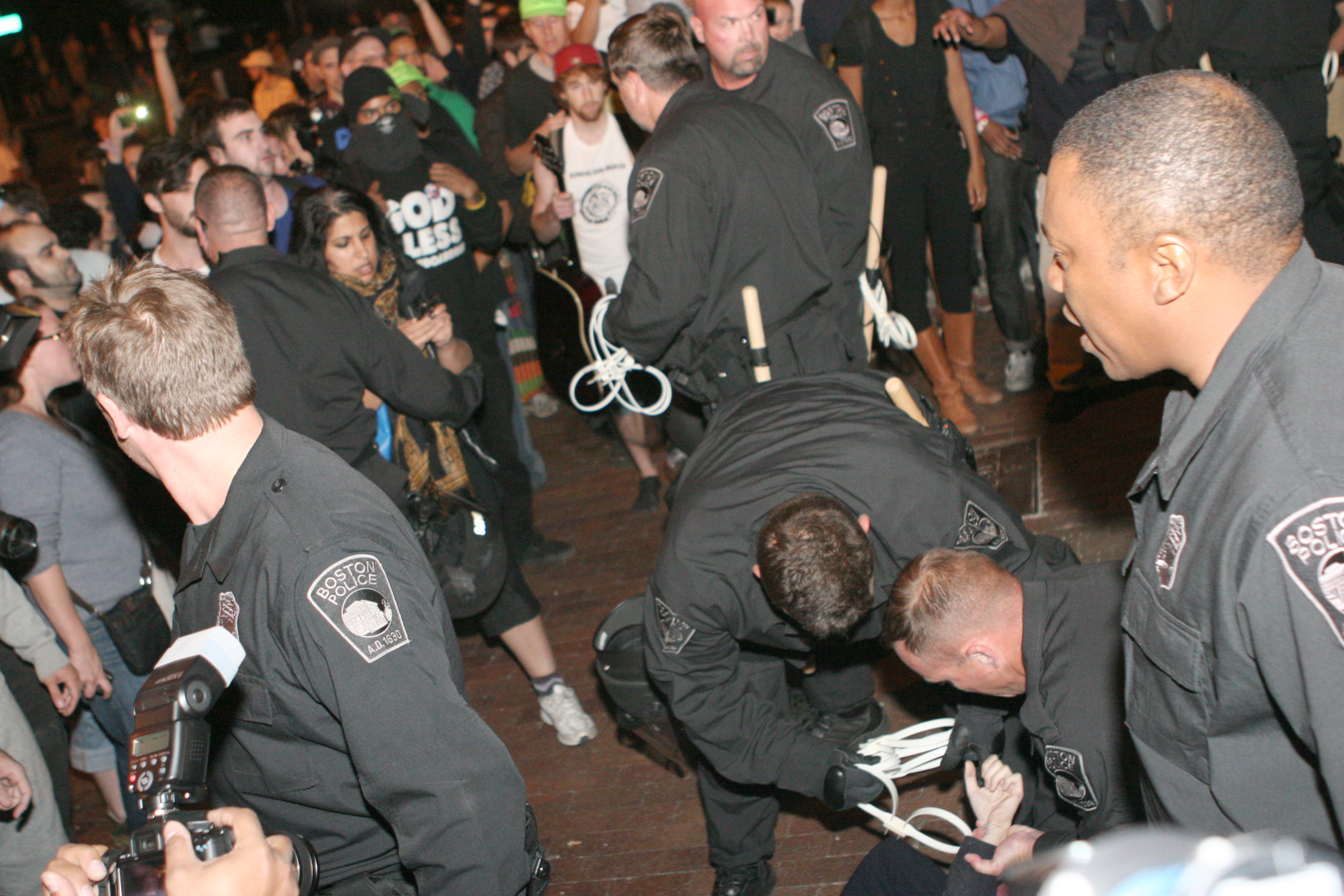
October 10, 2011

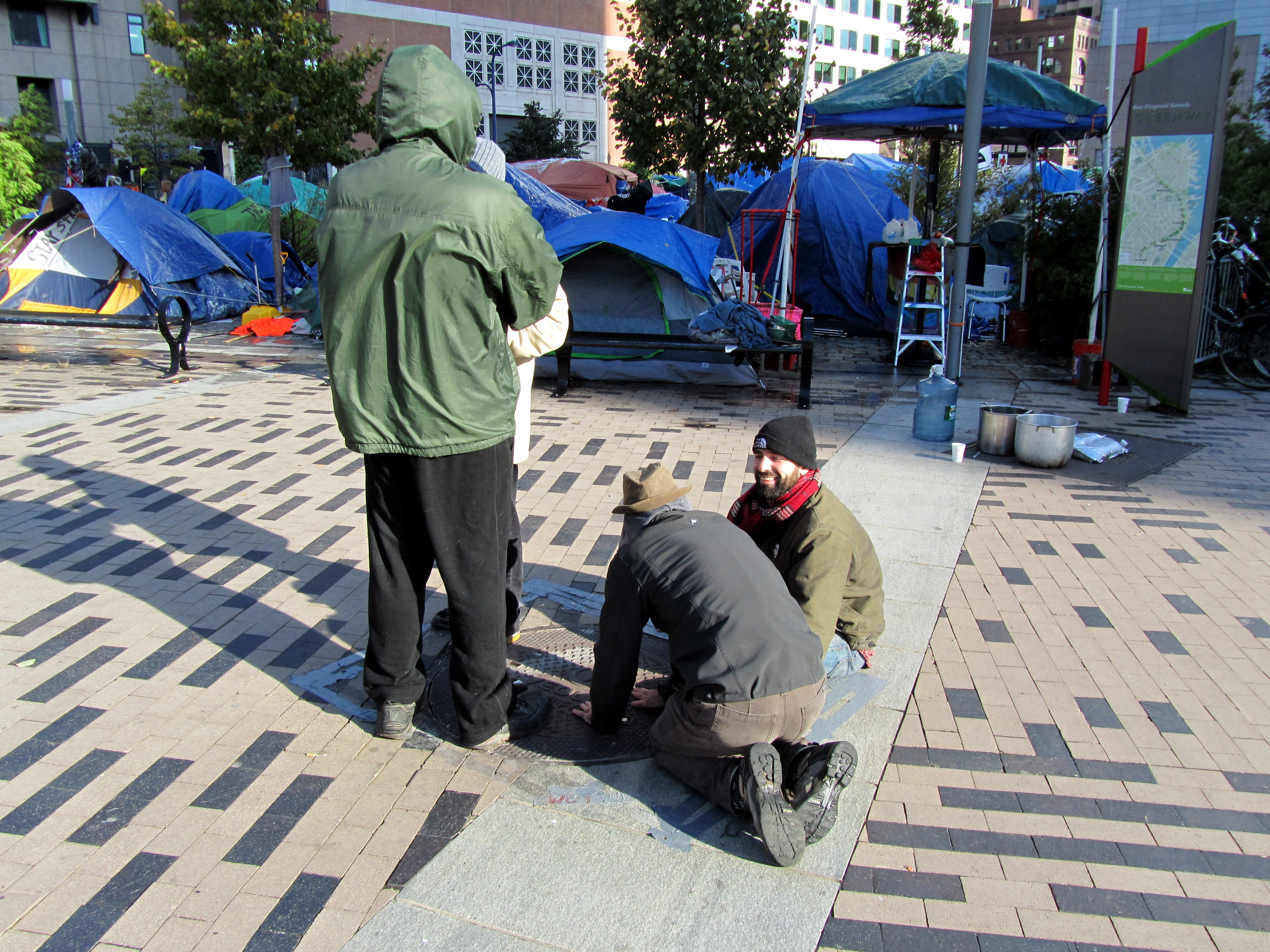
October 30, 2011

== See also ==
Occupy articles

- List of global Occupy protest locations
- Occupy movement
- Timeline of Occupy Wall Street
- We are the 99%

Other Protests

- 15 October 2011 global protests
- 2011 United States public employee protests
- 2011 Wisconsin protests

Related articles

- Arab Spring
- Corruption Perceptions Index
- Economic inequality
- Grassroots movement
- Income inequality in the United States
- Lobbying
- Plutocracy
- Protest
- Tea Party protests
- Wealth inequality in the United States

Related portals:
