= John Andrew & Son =

Defunct engraving firm (established 1869)

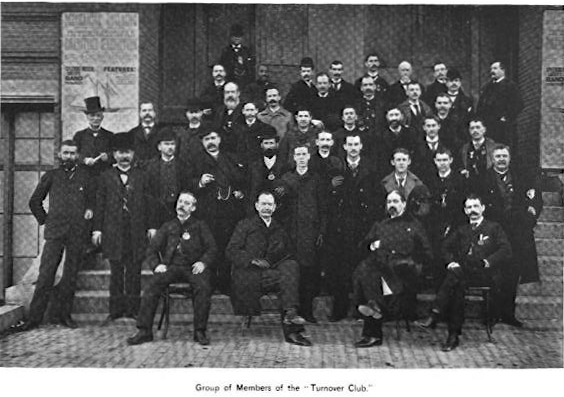
The "Maritime Turnover Club." International Maritime Exhibition held Nov. 4, 1889 - Jan.4, 1890, in the Mechanics' Building, Huntington Ave., Boston, Mass.

John Andrew & Son (est.1869) was an engraving firm in Boston, Massachusetts, established by John Andrew and his son George T. Andrew. Work produced by the firm appeared in publications of Lee & Shepard and Edward S. Curtis, and in titles such as Anthony's Photographic Bulletin. The business was located on Temple Place (1870s-1890s) and Summer Street (ca.1910s). Among the employees: Allan Evans Herrick, George A. Teel, and R.B. Whitney
