= Climax Locomotive Works =

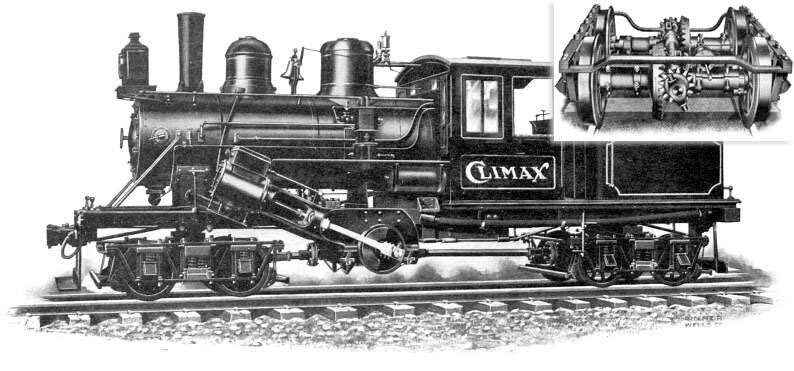
A manufacturer's drawing of a Class B Climax locomotive built by Climax Locomotive Works. The inset shows a detail of the central drive shaft.

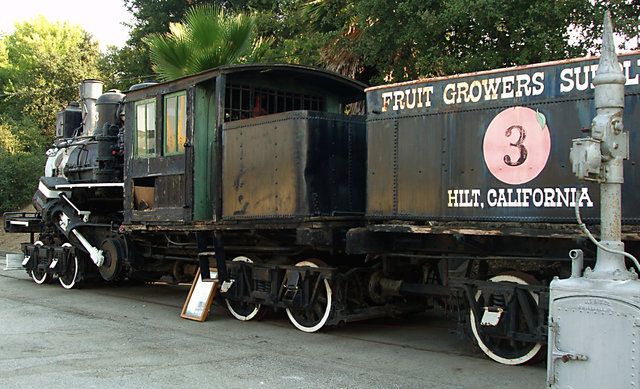
Fruit Growers Supply Company Engine number 3, Climax Class C, geared locomotive

The Climax Locomotive Works (formerly the Climax Manufacturing Company) was a manufacturer of Climax geared steam locomotives between 1888 and 1928. It was based in Corry, Pennsylvania.
