= Dewey Square =

Square in downtown Boston, Massachusetts

- Square in Boston
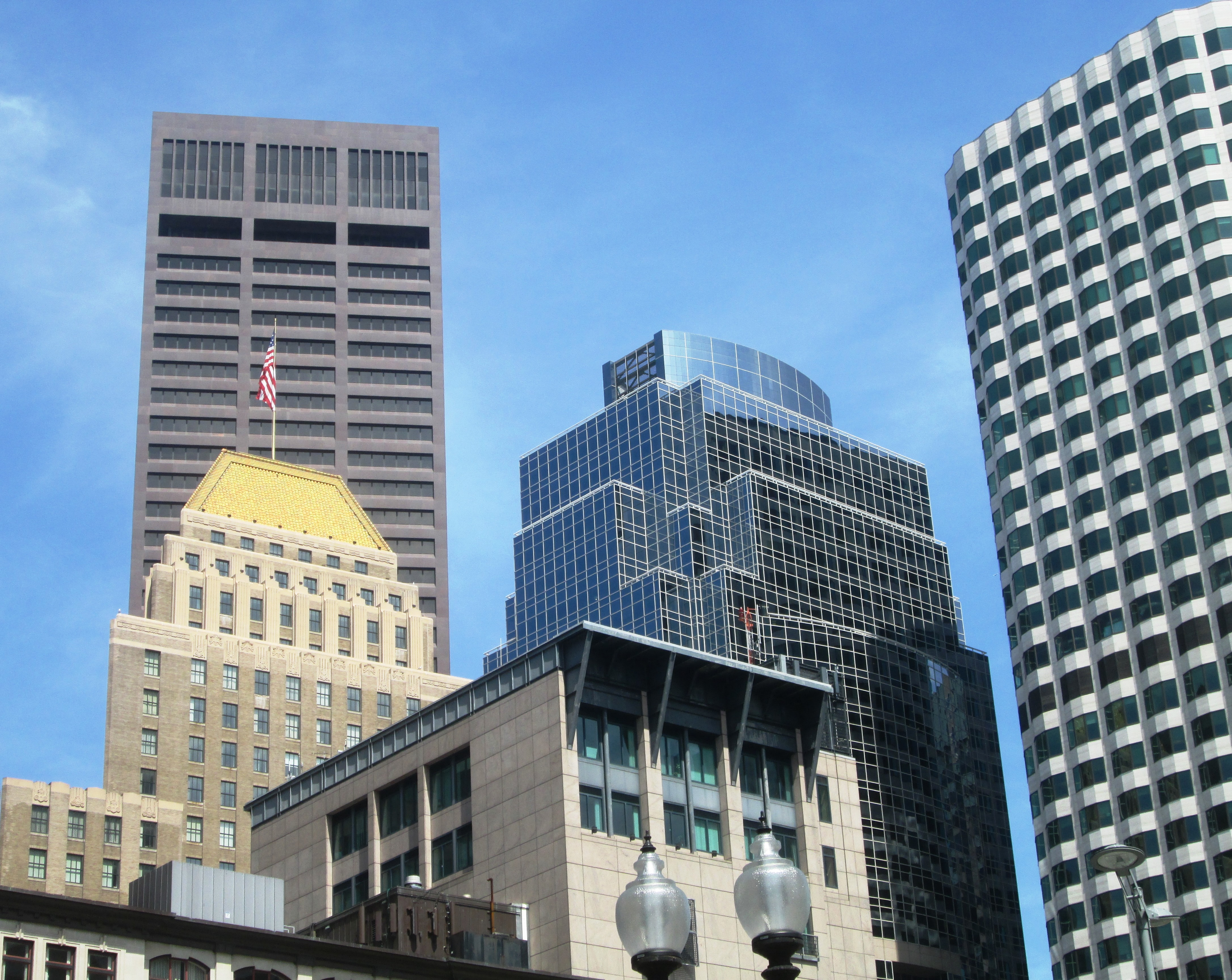
- High-rise buildings in Dewey Square
- Features: South Station
- Named for: George Dewey
- Location: Financial District, Boston, Massachusetts, United States
- Intersection: Summer Street, Purchase Street, Atlantic Avenue
- Interactive map of Dewey Square
- Coordinates: 42.35283°N 71.05557°W

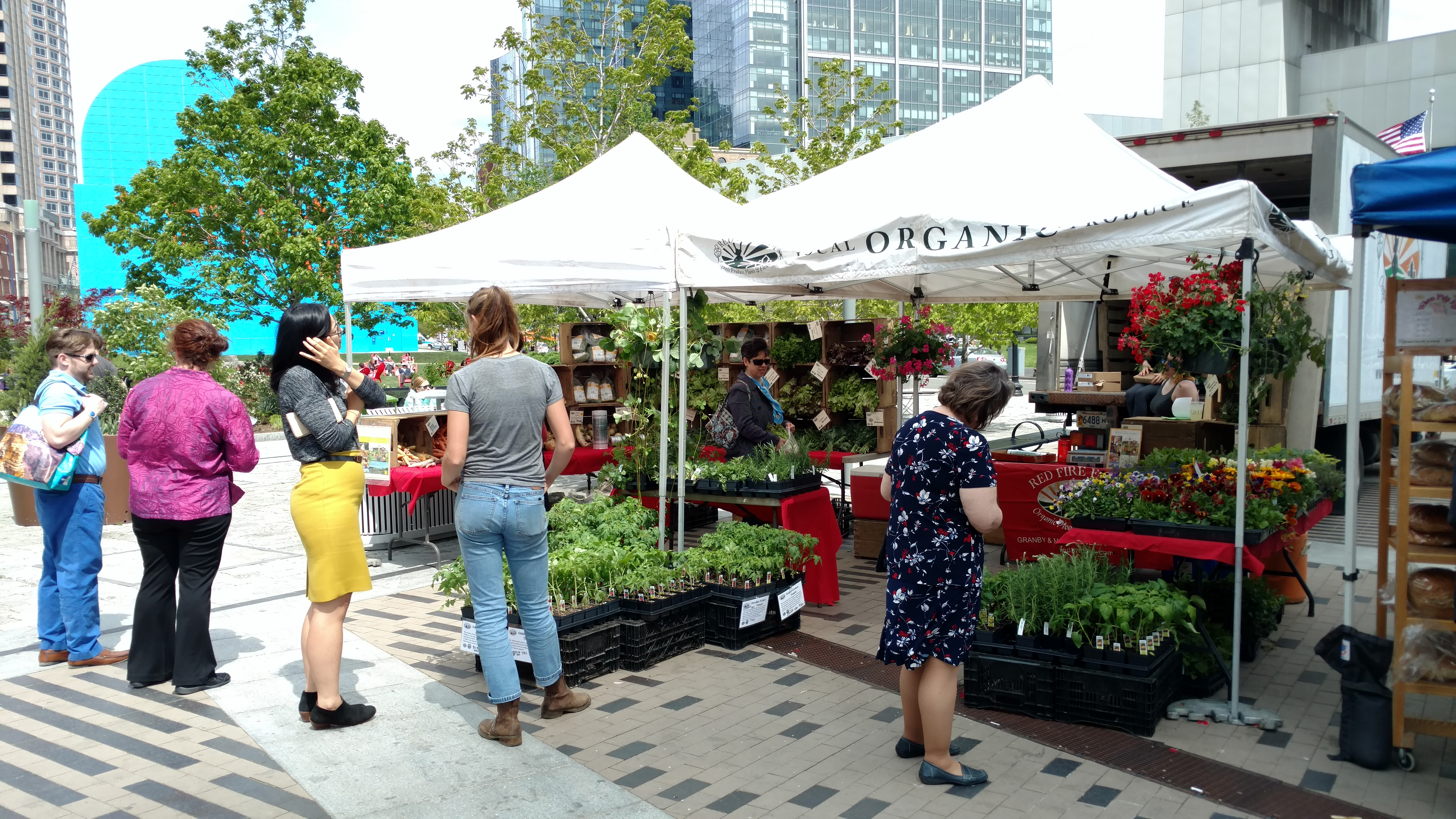
The Dewey Square Farmers Market

Dewey Square is a square in downtown Boston, Massachusetts which lies at the intersection of Atlantic Avenue, Summer Street, Federal Street, Purchase Street and the John F. Kennedy Surface Road, with the Central Artery (I-93) passing underneath in the Dewey Square Tunnel, which was built in the Big Dig. South Station is on the southeast corner of the square, with Amtrak and MBTA Commuter Rail services, as well as Red Line subway trains and Silver Line bus rapid transit underneath.

It is named for the only Admiral of the Navy in U.S. history, George Dewey.

The Dewey Square of New York City, also named after George Dewey in 1922 from its previous name of Kilpatrick Square, was renamed A. Philip Randolph Square in 1964 after A. Philip Randolph.

== History ==
The square was named in honor of Admiral George Dewey after his decisive 1898 victory in the Battle of Manila Bay. Before the Central Artery construction of the 1950s, it was simply an intersection with traffic islands and rail infrastructure, surrounded by buildings with no open space. In 1898, Summer Street was extended east as a local road, and in 1899 the Summer Street Bridge was built across Fort Point Channel. Also in 1899, Federal Street was closed south of Dewey Square to make way for the new South Station, and Atlantic Avenue was extended along the west side of the new terminal along with a realignment of the Union Freight Railroad. Around this time, the Boston Elevated Railway reorganized its streetcar tracks into a grand union at the intersection of Summer and Atlantic. The Atlantic Avenue Elevated came in 1901 with an elevated station (also called South Station) one block south of Dewey Square. It was closed in 1938 and torn down in the early 1940s; the Union Freight Railroad lasted until 1970.

The next major change came in the 1950s when the Central Artery was built. The whole area on the north and south sides of the square was cleared, and the Artery was built underground via the Dewey Square Tunnel. Atlantic Avenue became one-way northbound and Purchase Street one way southbound to the north of the square, and the new Surface Artery came in as a two-way road above the tunnel heading southwest from the square. Between 1969 and 1978, Boston closed both Federal Street and Summer Street for a block west of the square (they had formerly operated as a one-way pair). Summer Street has since reopened (as a two-way road), but Federal Street is still a pedestrian mall.

The Big Dig in the late 1990s and early 2000s kept the one-way configurations north of the square, but now Atlantic Avenue continues as one-way (northbound) south of the square, and Surface Artery is one-way southbound.

For some time, a temporary intercity bus depot for providers such as Peter Pan, Trailways and others was located just north of Dewey Square over the Central Artery. This temporary bus station replaced an earlier Trailways bus station that had been located in Park Square. All intercity buses were relocated in 1993 to the nearby South Station Bus Terminal just south of South Station, situated above the train tracks.

The area is now largely an open plaza at the southern end of the Rose Kennedy Greenway, which features food trucks and a seasonal farmer's market operated by the Boston Public Market.

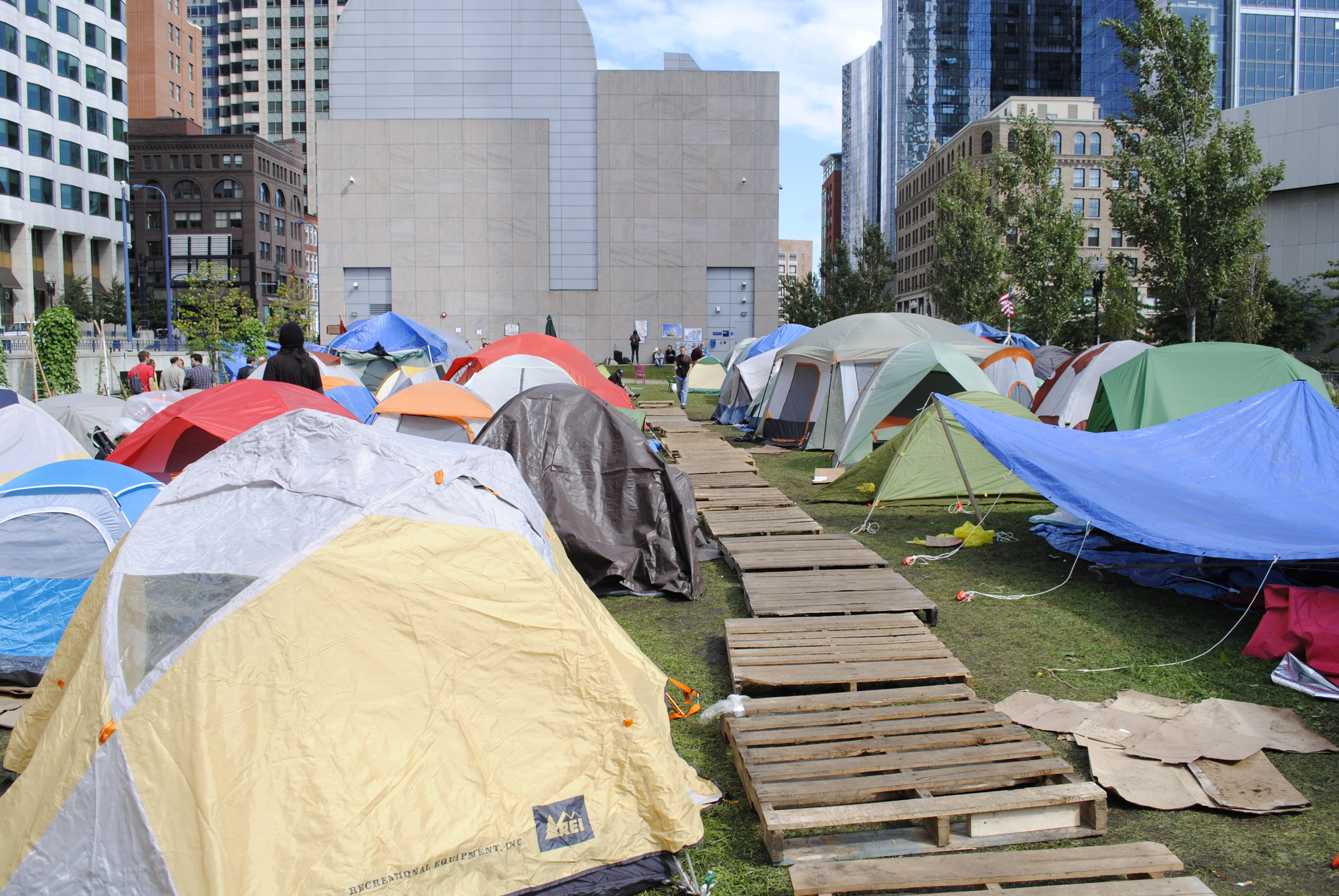
Occupy Boston tent city in Dewey Square, 2011

From September 30 to December 10, 2011, Dewey Square was the site of the Occupy Boston tent city.
