= Summer Street (Boston) =

Street in Boston, Massachusetts

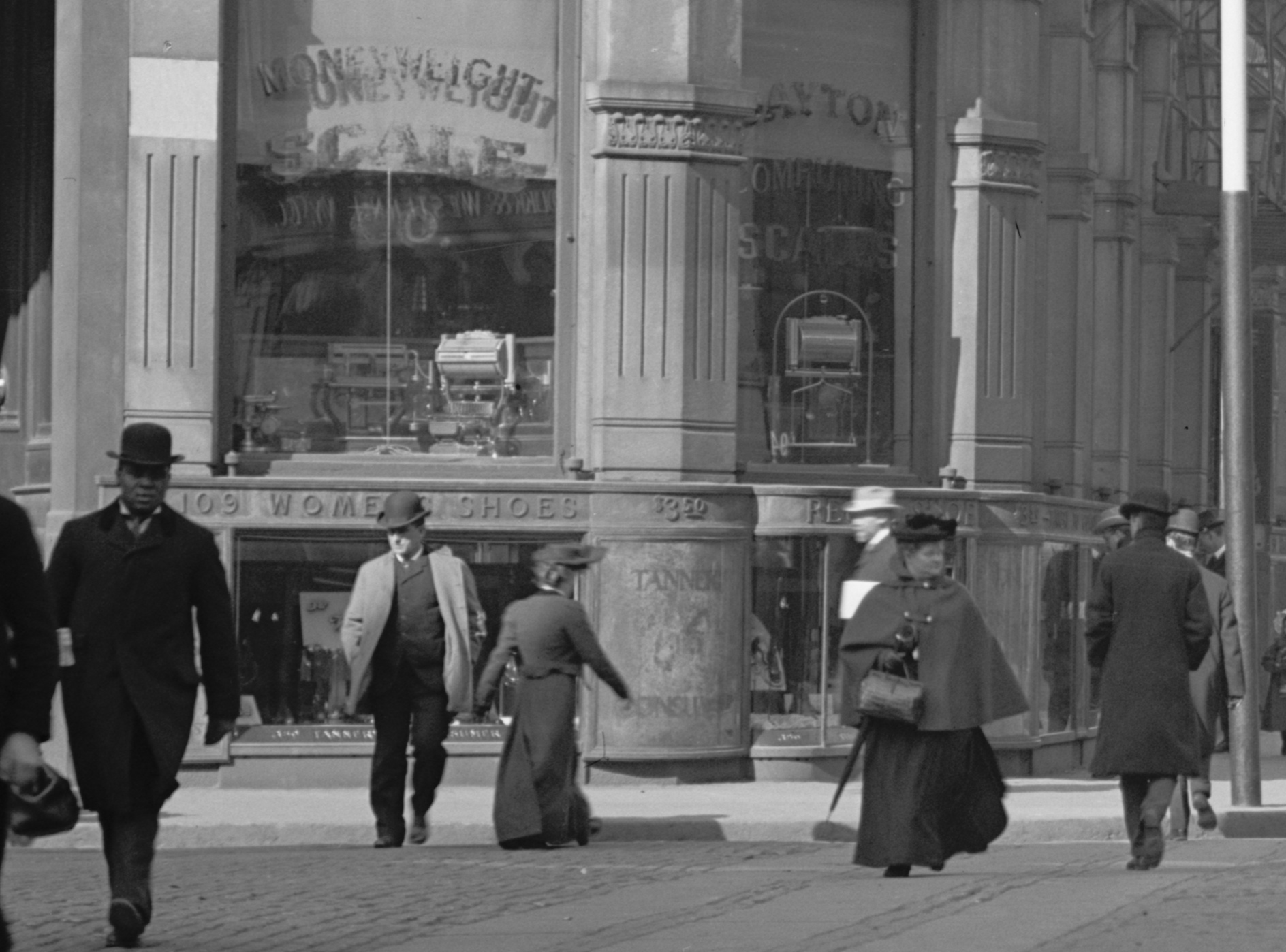
- Summer Street in Boston in 1904
- Interactive map of Summer Street
- Location: Boston
- West end: Washington Street
- Major junctions: I-93
- East end: East 1st Street / L Street

Summer Street (est. 1708) in Boston, Massachusetts, extends from Downtown Crossing in the Financial District, over Fort Point Channel, and into the Seaport District to the southeast. In the mid-19th century it was also called Seven Star Lane. Seven Star Lane was named so for "Seven Stars," a tavern once located at the northwest corner of Summer and Hawley streets.

Along the route is Dewey Square, which is formed by the intersection of Atlantic Avenue, Summer, Federal, and Purchase Streets with the Surface Artery of the Boston Central Artery (I-93). The intermodal transit terminal South Station is also located along the road, with Amtrak and MBTA Commuter Rail services, as well as Red Line subway trains and Silver Line bus rapid transit.

In South Boston, Summer Street goes past the Boston Convention and Exhibition Center.

== Current and former residents ==
=== Notable locations ===
- 100 Summer Street
- Boston Internet Exchange at One Summer Street
- Federal Reserve Bank of Boston
- Fidelity Investments
- South Station

=== Notable residents ===
- John Andrew & Son
- Joseph Barrell
- Edward Everett
- Filene's Department Store
- William Gray, 19th-century merchant
- John Hull
- New South Church
- L.C. Page & Company
- Ebenezer Pemberton, c. 1810, educator
- James Sullivan, governor
- Trinity Church

== Image gallery ==
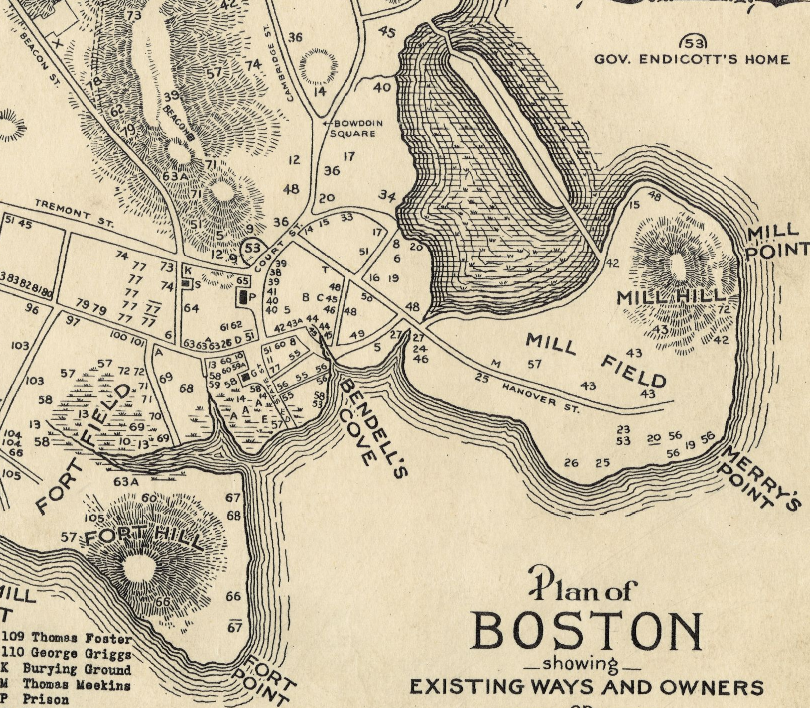
Hull Mint #96

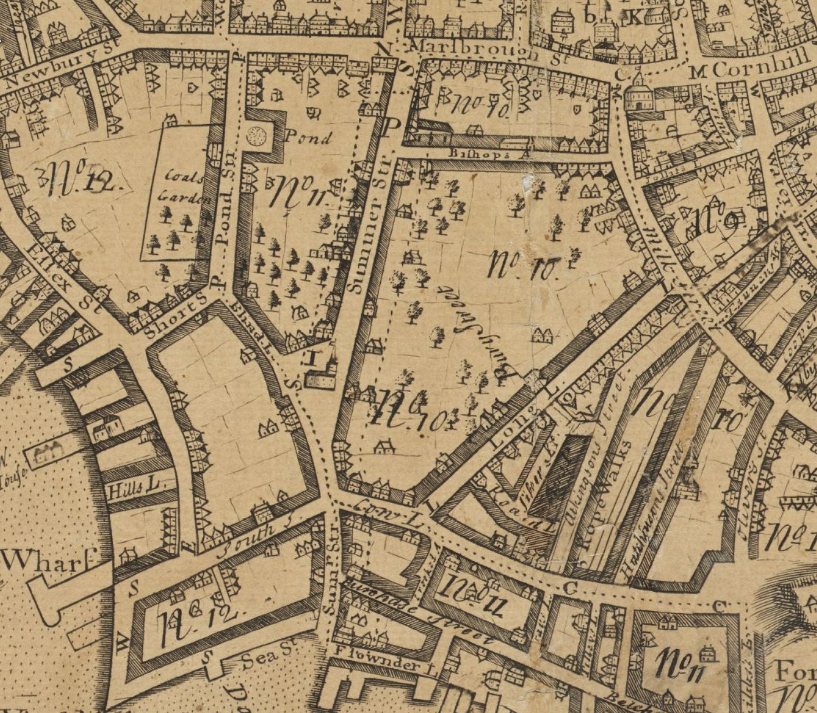
Detail of 1769 map of Boston, showing extent of Summer Street from Washington Street to Sea Street

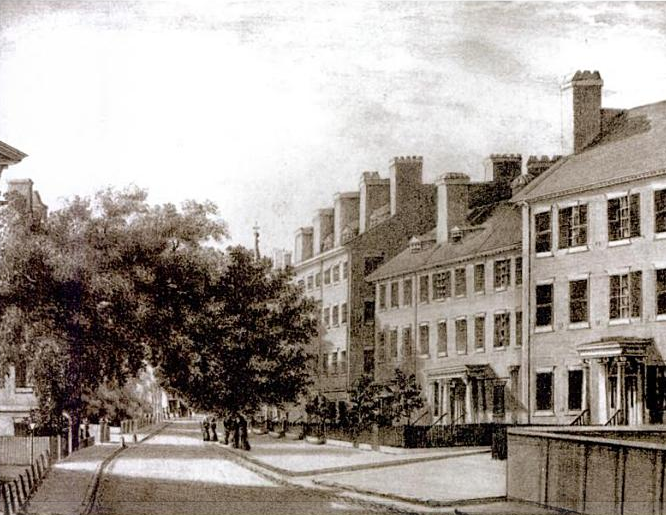
19th century

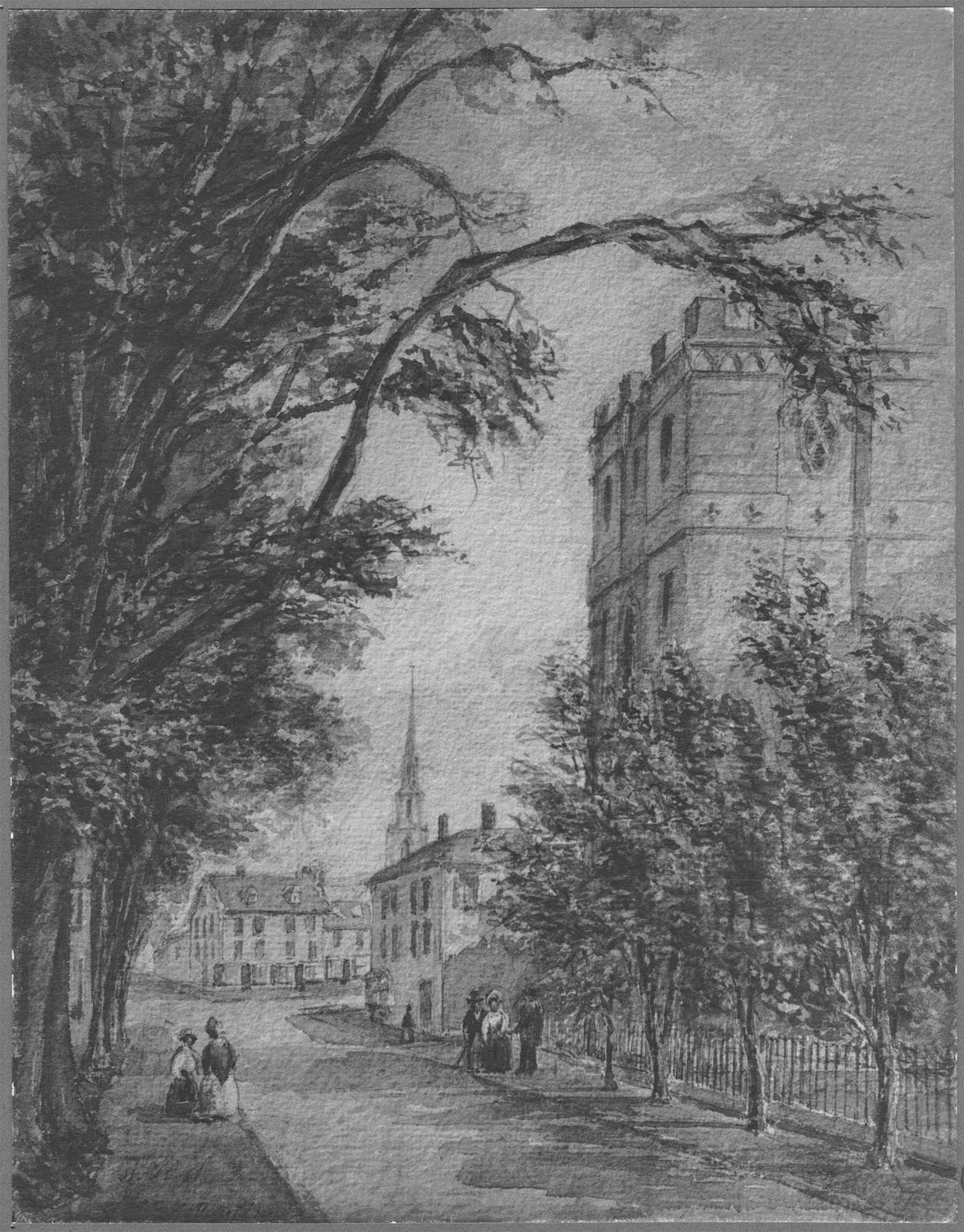
1846

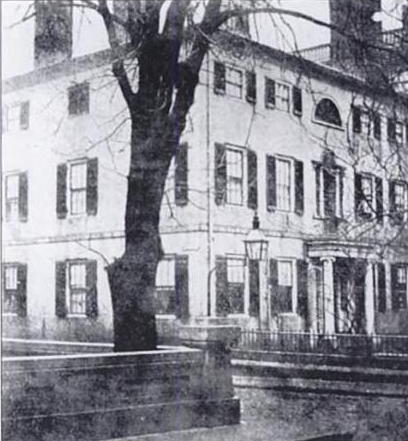
Tappan house, 19th century

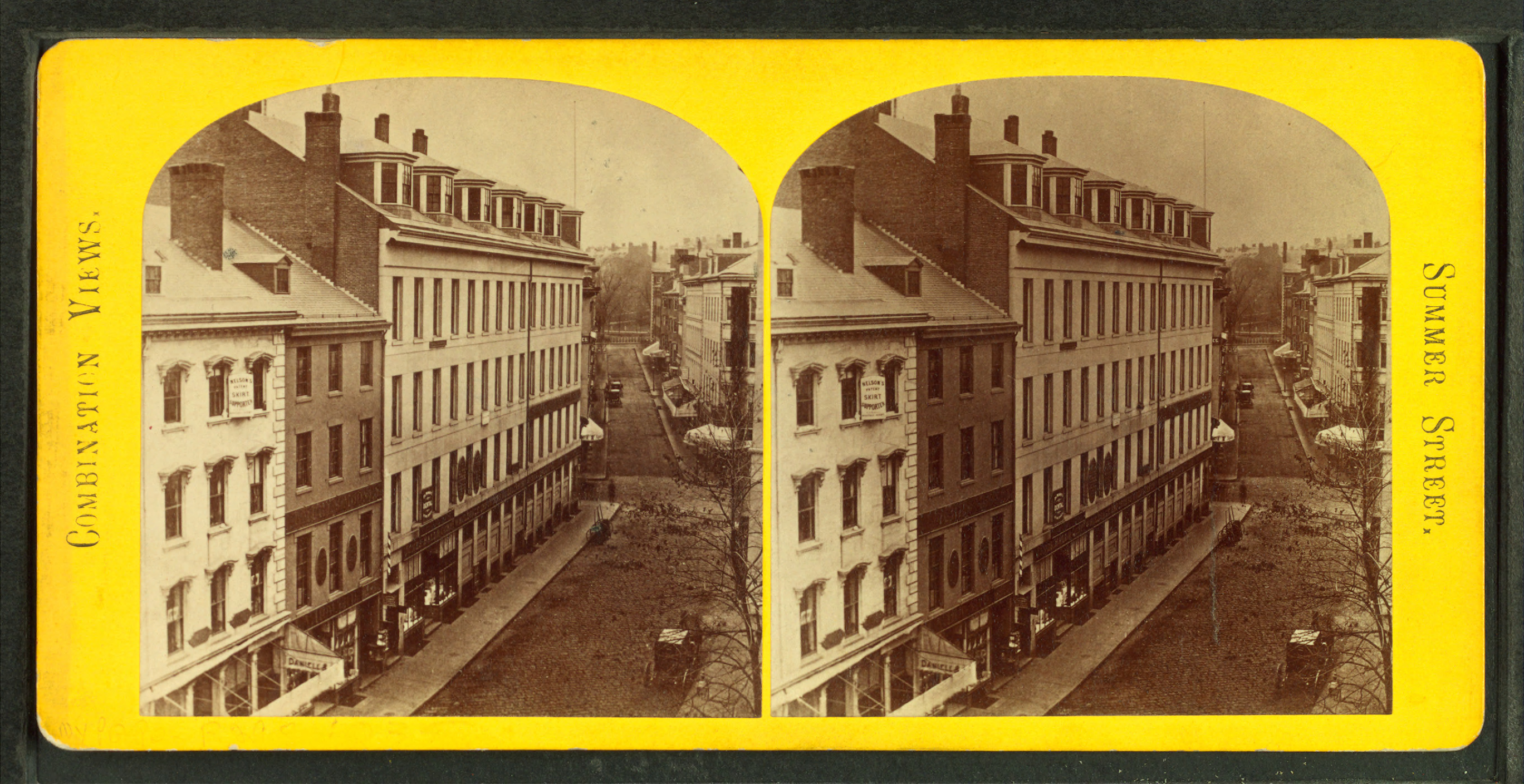
c. 1870

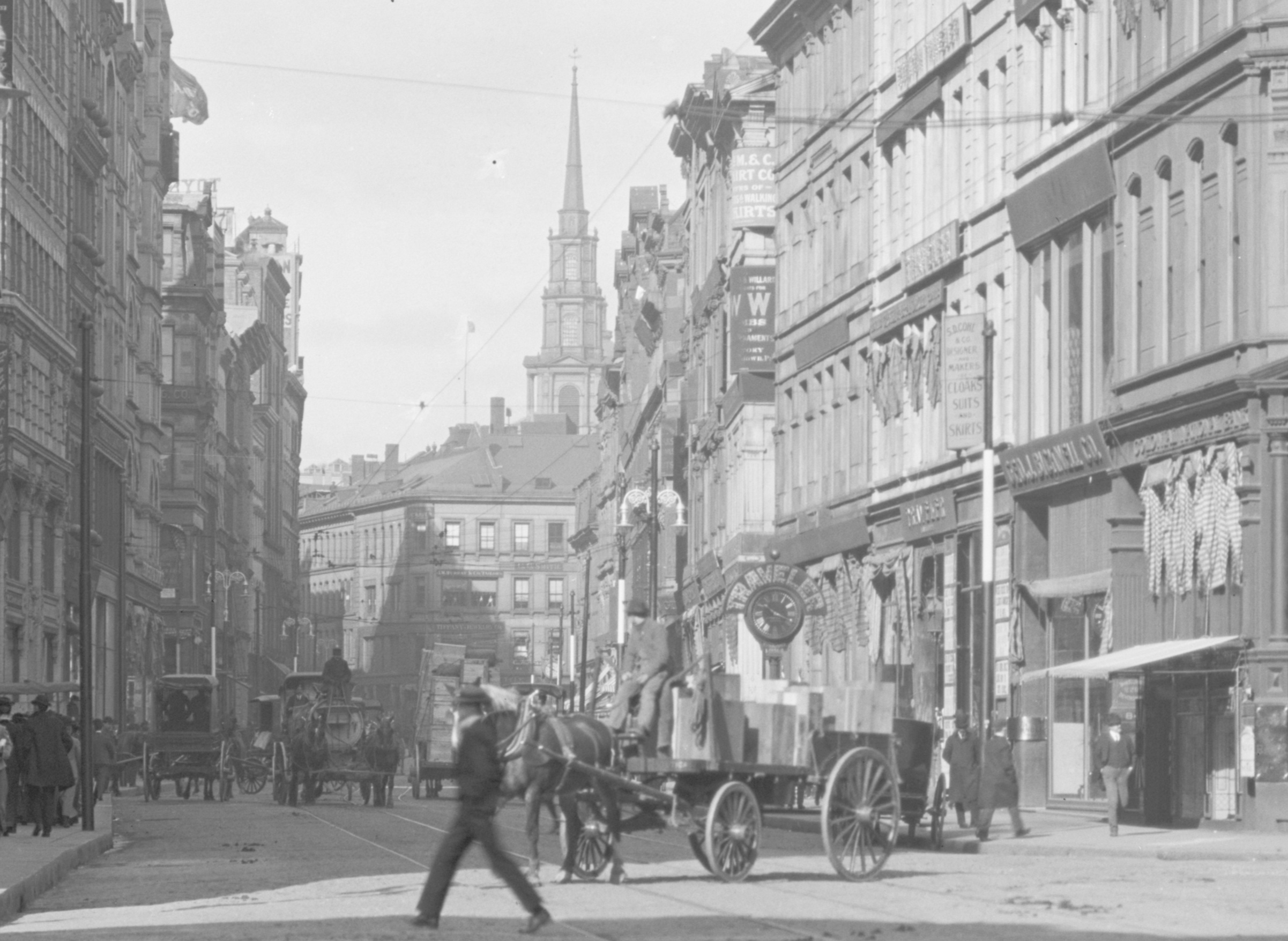
1904

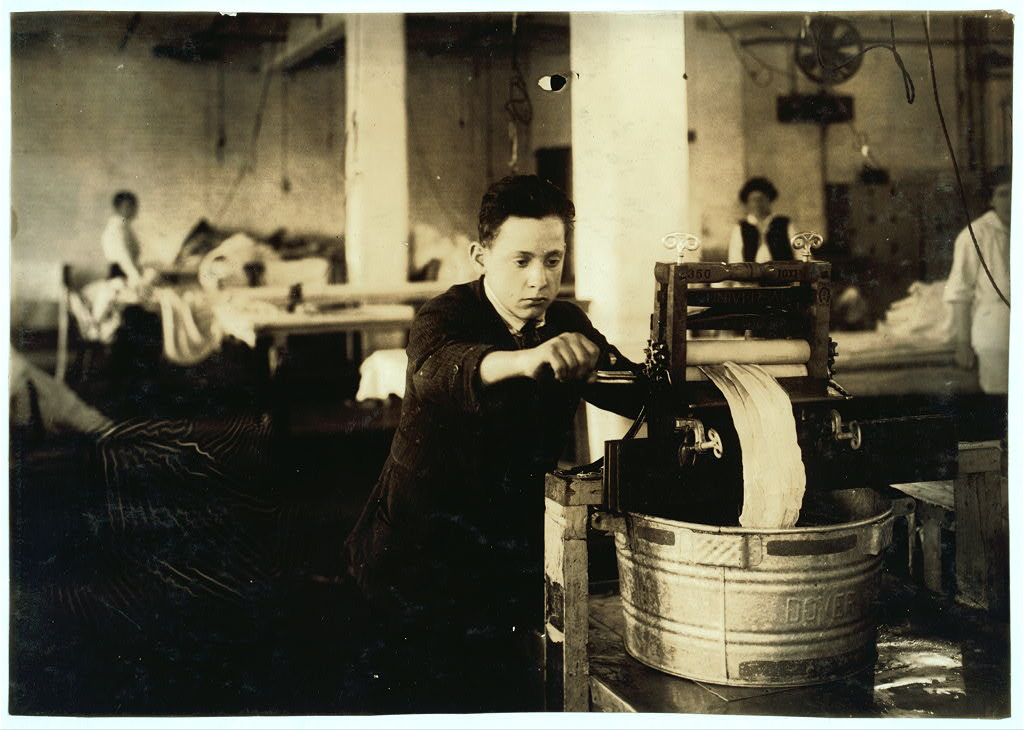
Edward McGurin, 14 years old, wringing curtains at Boutwell, Fairclough & Gold, 274 Summer Street, 1917; photo by Lewis Hine

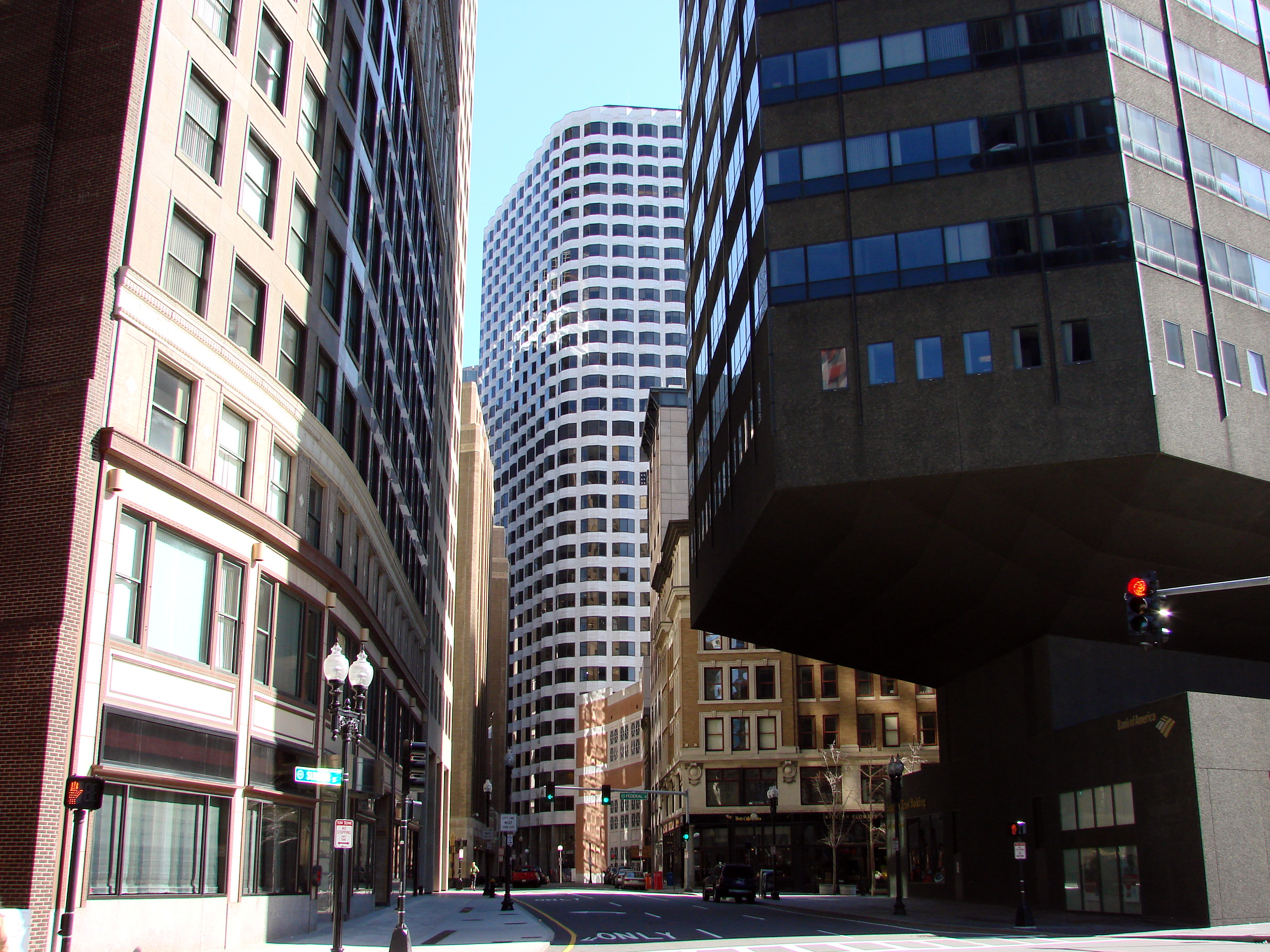
2008

== See also ==
- Dewey Square
- Downtown Crossing
- Great Boston Fire of 1872
- Summer Street Bridge disaster
