= Climax locomotive =

Type of geared steam locomotive

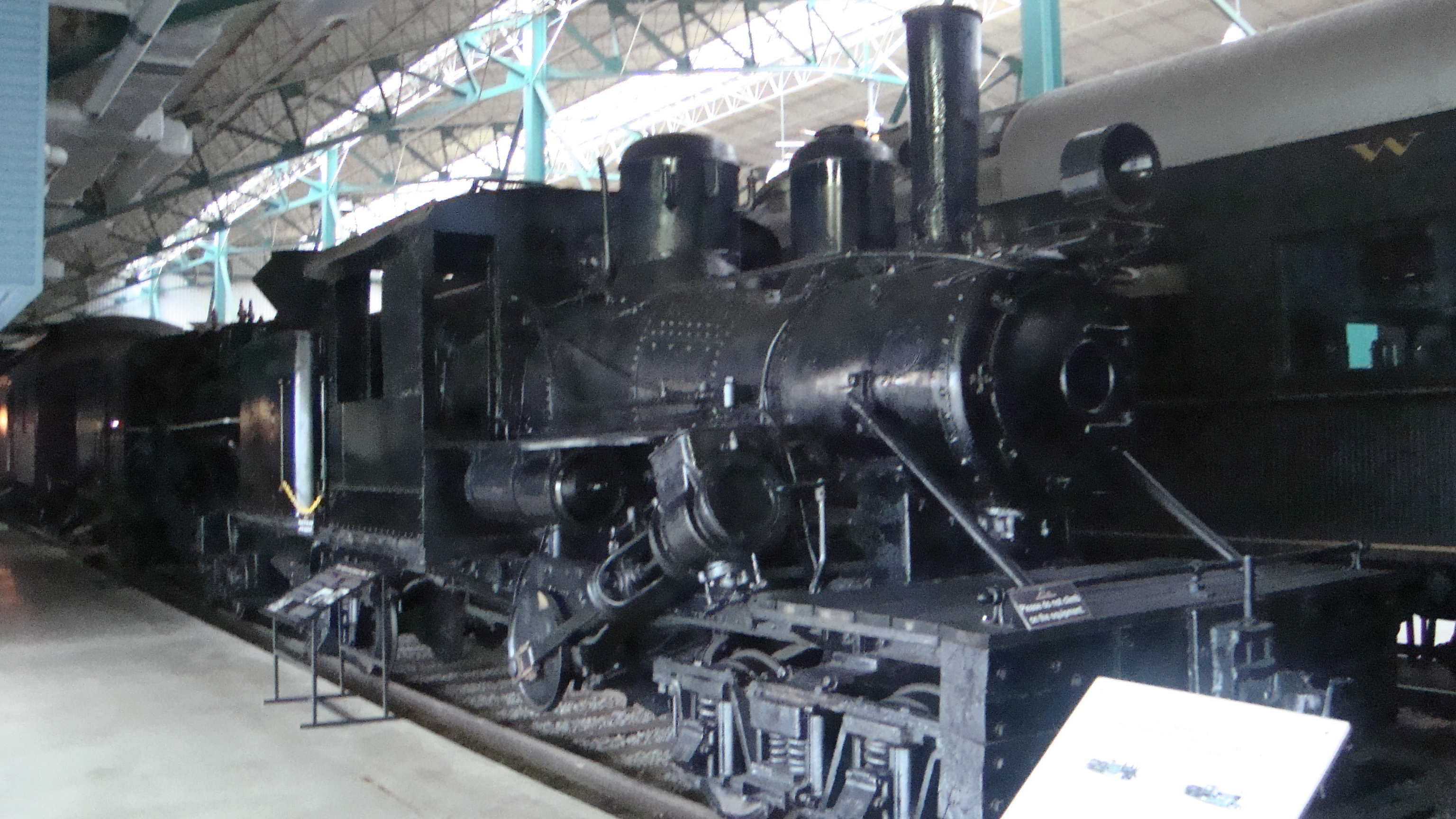
A small Class B Climax locomotive owned by the Oregon Lumber Company on display at the Railroad Museum of Pennsylvania

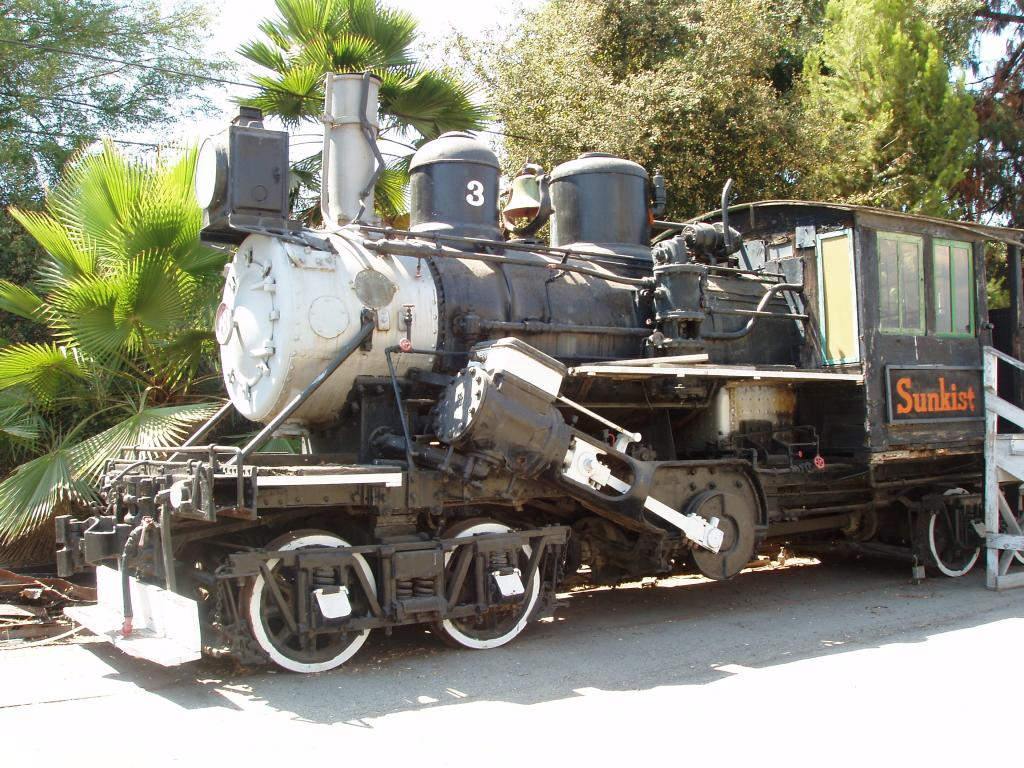
Fruit Growers Number 3, a Class C Climax locomotive on display at the RailGiants Train Museum in Pomona, California

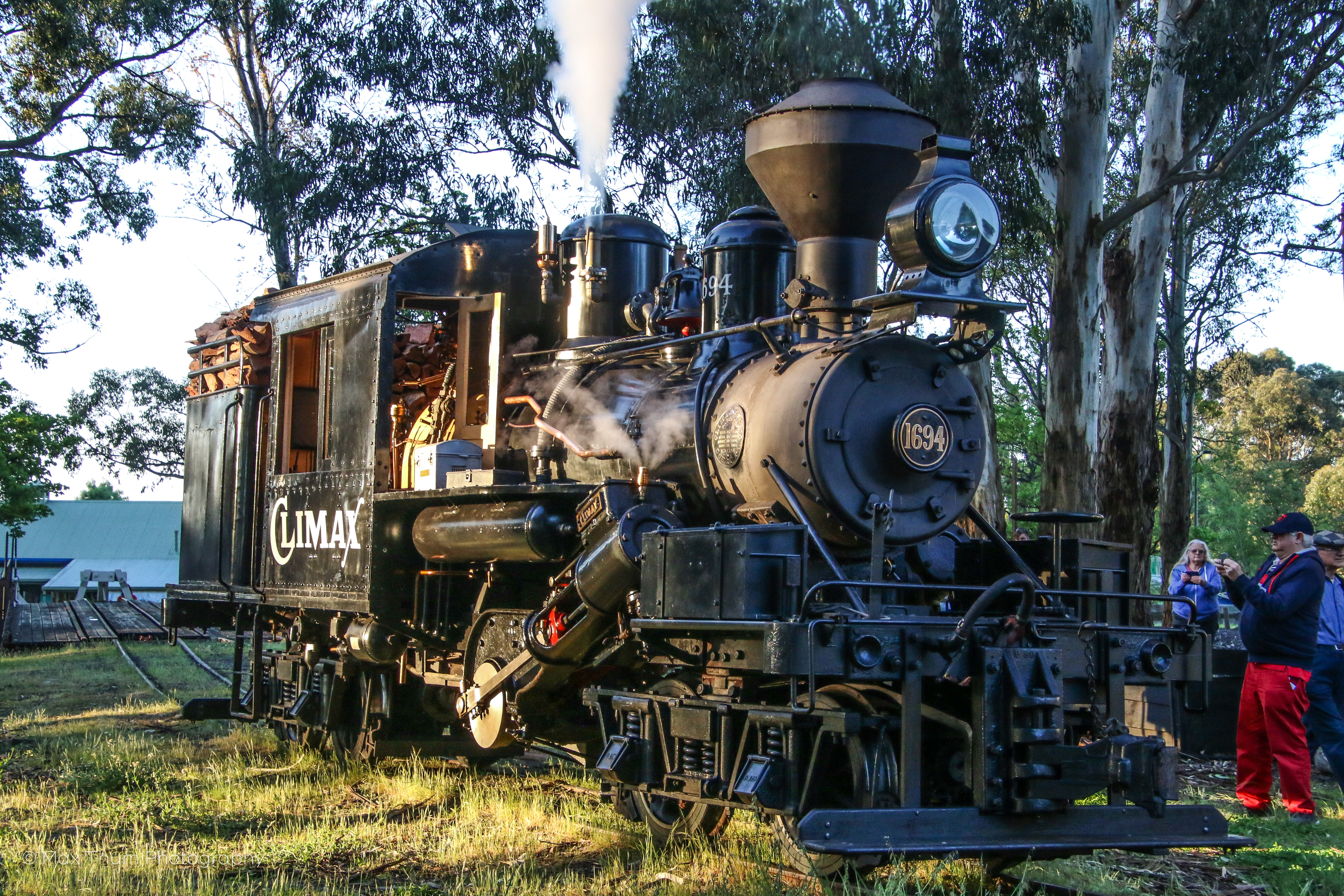
Class B Climax locomotive Number 1694 at Emerald station preparing for a charter tour on the Puffing Billy Railway in Victoria, Australia

A Climax locomotive is a type of geared steam locomotive built by the Climax Manufacturing Company (later renamed to the Climax Locomotive Works), of Corry, Pennsylvania. These had two steam cylinders attached to a transmission located under the center of the boiler, which sent power to driveshafts running to the front and rear trucks. Some 1,000-1,100 were built in three classes (A, B, and C) between 1888 and 1928.

== Invention and production ==
The invention of the Climax locomotive is attributed to Charles D. Scott, who ran a forest railway near Spartansburg, Pennsylvania between 1875 and 1878. A lumberjack of considerable mechanical ingenuity, Scott sought to bring an improved logging locomotive of his own design to market and brought the drawings to the nearby Climax Manufacturing Company in Corry, Pennsylvania. The first four Climax locomotives were built and delivered in 1888. The design patent was filed in February in the same year and granted in December. The invention was not patented in the name of Scott, as he had only a limited education, so he left the drawings to his brother-in-law George D. Gilbert, who was a civil engineer by profession and worked for Climax. Gilbert had the invention patented in his name without mentioning Scott.

=== Gilbert patent ===
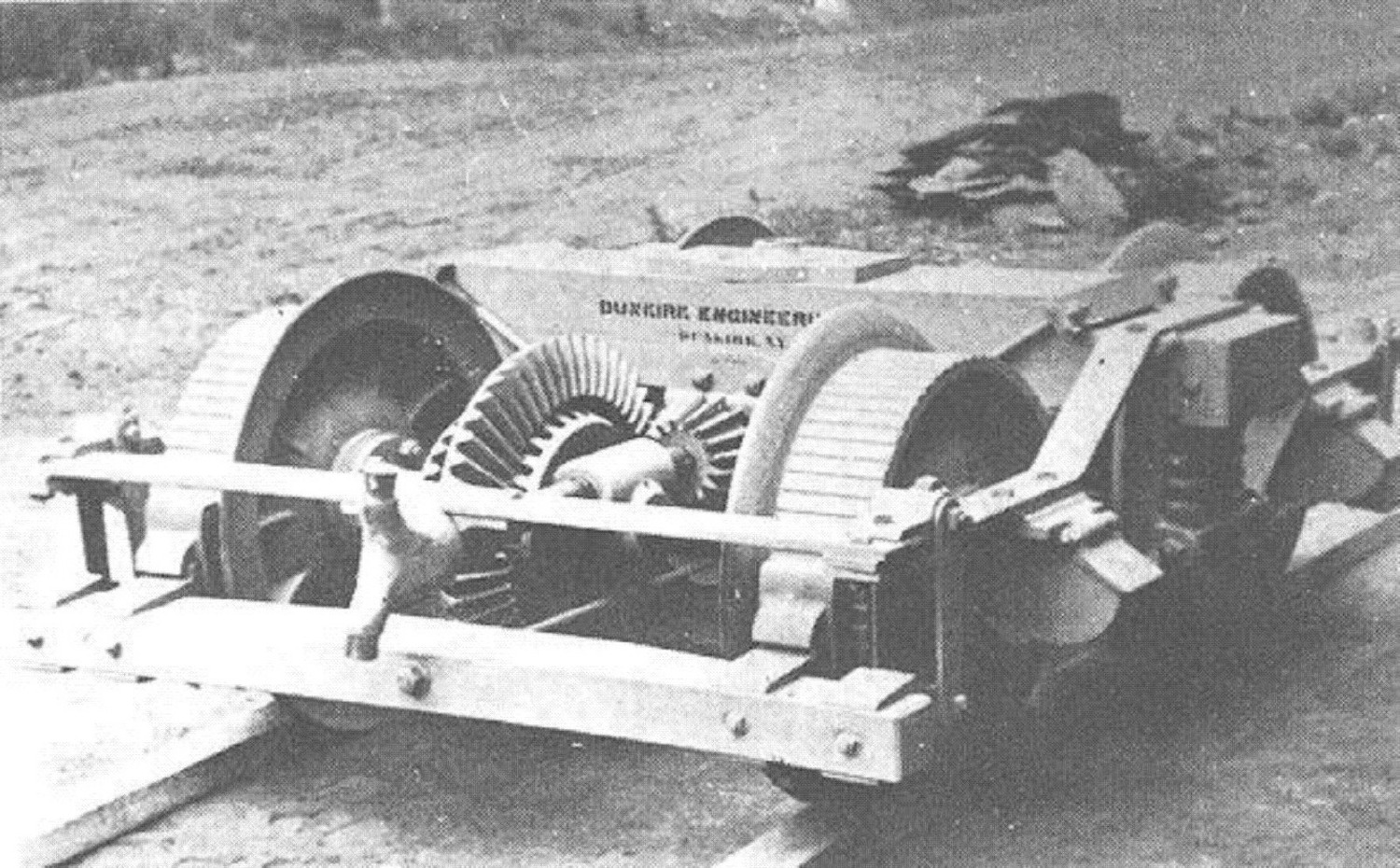
Truck with differential as proposed by Gilbert, which was only used on the first Climax locomotives

Gilbert's patent specified an upright maritime-type two-cylinder steam engine, a 2-speed transmission and a drivetrain in the underframe passing just above the axle centers. The patented differential for transferring the power from the drive shaft to the wheels was only used in the first Climax locomotives. In a similar way to that used in an automobile, the force was transferred to the two wheels of an axle separately, with one wheel being firmly connected to the wheelset shaft and the other wheel being able to rotate loosely on a sleeve around the shaft. The idea of the differential transmissions was to reduce resistance on tight bends by allowing one wheel to turn with fewer revolutions than the one at the other end of the axle. The design did not prove workable, because when driving at the adhesion limit, less tractive effort could be exerted compared to locomotives with rigid wheelsets.

=== Battles patent ===
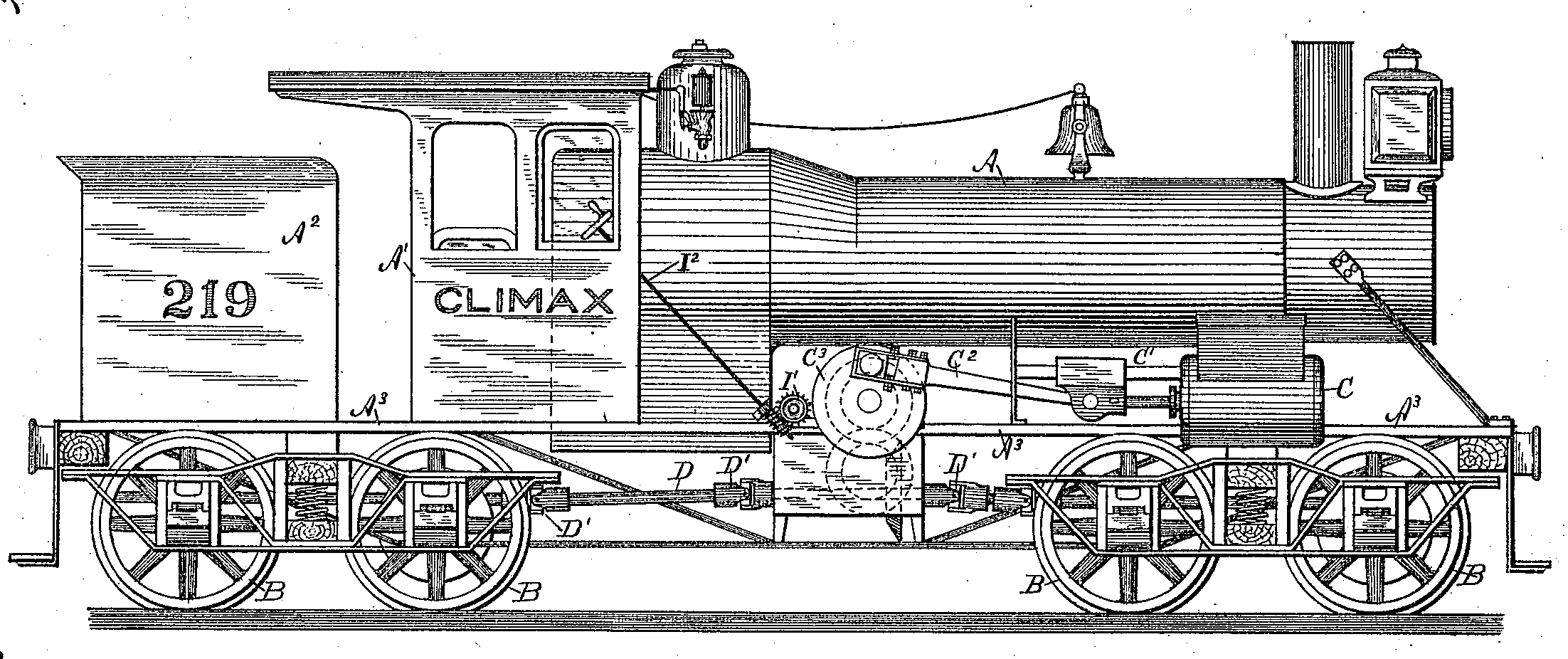
Fig. 1 of US Patent 455154 by Battles showing the prototype of the Class B Climax locomotive.

Rush S. Battles patented the basic design of the drivetrain without the differential, using simple hypoid bevel gears to drive the wheelsets with normal fixed wheels. Unlike the later, somewhat similar Heisler design, there were no side rods on the trucks and all gearing was open and exposed to the elements.

A further patent from 1891 describes a locomotive with horizontal cylinders connected to the drive shaft through a 2-speed transmission. Battles's patent describes the core design that became the Class B Climax, and his patent illustrations show the name Climax emblazoned on the locomotive cab.

=== Scott patent ===
Charles D. Scott, who had previously proposed a less successful geared steam locomotive, filed a lawsuit against Gilbert and Battles and applied for a patent in his own name, which was granted to him on 20 December 1892 after a lengthy legal dispute. But the lawsuit left Scott penniless because he could hardly benefit from the invention.

Scott's patent showed the arrangement of the steam engine, boiler and two-speed gearbox in accordance with Gilbert's patent while the drive without differential gearbox was described in accordance to Battles' patent. Scott's patent corresponds to the most common design of Class A Climax locomotives.

In 1893, Scott proposed a geared steam locomotive, in which the frame of the boiler was hinged to the frame of the tender. The running gear underneath the boiler was firmly connected to it and was driven by common lateral cylinders and side rods. Underneath the tender was a truck which was similar to the Climax locomotives driven by a central shaft which took the power from the front axle of the locomotive via a hypoid bevel gear. For the first time, the design used closed axle drives with housings on one hand protecting the gear unit from dirt and on the other hand also containing the gear lubricant.

=== Production ===
All Climax locomotives were built by the Climax Manufacturing Company (later renamed to the Climax Locomotive Works), of Corry, Pennsylvania. In addition, an agency and service facility was established in Seattle, Washington, to sell and maintain locomotives for west coast buyers. Production began in 1888 and the last Climax locomotive was produced in 1928. Between 1,000 and 1,100 were built.

=== Operational reliability ===
Many loggers considered the Climax superior to the Shay in hauling capability and stability, particularly in a smaller locomotive. This was due to its fully sprung truck arrangement; the Shay locomotive had no springs on the bogie on the drivetrain side and was therefore not fully able to compensate for twists in the track. The ride on the large class C Climax was characteristically rough for the crew, since the imbalance of the large drivetrain could only be compensated at one speed.

== Classes ==
Climaxes were built in three distinct classes:

=== Class A ===
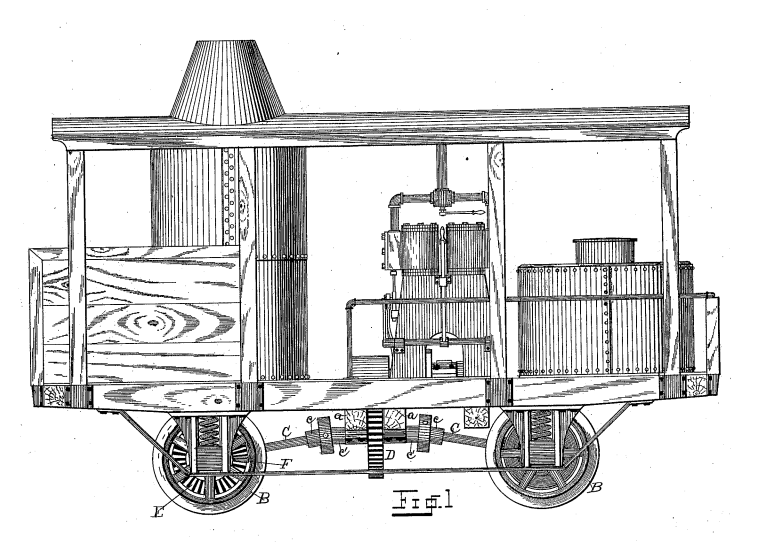
Patent drawing of an early two-axle Class A Climax locomotive (Class A Climax, US patent 423720).

These featured a steam engine unit with two vertical cylinders mounted in the center of the locomotive. Class A Climaxes had a frame similar to a flatcar with wooden boxcar-like bodywork built up above it to protect the crew and fuel from the elements—this could be more or less covering between locomotive to locomotive. The front half of the locomotive, in front of the engine unit, contained the boiler. Initially the boiler was vertical, but between 1893 and 1895 the design was altered to incorporate a rounded "tee" style boiler instead. This design was altere again circa 1904, when a square "tee" style boiler replaced the rounded style.

Initially, class A climaxes were delivered with wooden frames. By 1911, steel main frame options became available but would raise the cost per unit. Although most climaxes were designed to have at least two bogies, drawings of fixed-wheel class A designs containing only four wheels do exist. Class A Climaxes were small locomotives, generally under 17 tons. Class A Climaxes, unlike Heisler and Shay locomotives, had two-speed gearboxes. In contrast to the naming convention, class A climaxes weren't necessarily always built before their class B and C counterparts.

Being relatively light compared to their shay and heisler counterparts, class A climax locomotives were uniquely suited to being pole-road locomotives. These locomotives sported double-flanged wheels in a conical shape to help them remain on the rough log-tracks they ran on.

=== Class B ===
Introduced in 1893, the Climax Class B was closer in appearance to a conventional steam locomotive. It had the cylinders on either side of the boiler, permitting a longer and larger boiler than the Class A arrangement. The two cylinders drove a transverse shaft that was geared to the longitudinal driveshaft in the middle; on early Class B Climaxes, the cylinders mounted horizontally (much like a conventional steam locomotive) but drove a counterweight mounted above the centerline of the wheels. This was done to accommodate the same gearshift mechanism found in the early class A climaxes, but this was deemed to be unnecessarily complex and was quickly substituted with a simpler design with cylinders angled at roughly 30 degrees without the shifting mechanism.

Class B Climaxes were initially offered at weights ranging from 17 to 35 tons. 17, 20, and 23 ton class B locomotives featured T-shaped square fireboxes with the steam dome mounted at the top of the fireboxes inside the cab. By 1910, steel cabs were offered for class B models. By 1915, walschaerts valve gear became available as a more efficient alternative to the Stephenson gear previously mounted on class B models, but eventually reached a maximum of approximately 60 tons. Although the catalogues did not show maximum speeds, class B locomotives were considered to have a top speed of ~15 mph (24 km/h).

=== Class C ===
A Class C was a three-truck design similar in layout to a Class B, the additional powered truck being beneath a water-carrying tender articulated to the locomotive. This allowed the locomotive to operate for longer periods of time before needing to stop for water. All Class C locomotives had inclined cylinders.

== Survivors ==
Approximately 17 Climax locomotives survive in North America, of which about five are operational.

- Two survive in Australia: No. 1694, restored and operational since 8 September 2013, at the Puffing Billy Railway, in Belgrave, and No. 1653, on display at Hobart, Tasmania.
- The New Zealand Climaxes are No. 522, stored at Tokomaru, No. 1203, stored in Shantytown Heritage Park near Greymouth, No. 1317, under static restoration at Te Awamutu, and No. 1650, returned to steam in 2025 at Pukemiro. Hence, four of the seven Climax locos delivered to New Zealand have survived.
- The Climax locomotive No. 9 (shop number 1551, formerly More-Keppel & Co. #6, Middle Fork Railroad #6) at the Cass Scenic Railroad State Park in West Virginia is operational, used alongside the Shays to power the regular excursions up Cheat Mountain from May to November. The locomotive is a 70-ton class C climax.
- The White Mountain Central Railroad located off Interstate 93 in Lincoln, New Hampshire, uses Climax #6 (Shop number 1603, formerly Woodstock Lumber Co #6, Parker-Young Co #6, Beebe River Railroad #6, East Branch & Lincoln Railroad #6) as its primary locomotive during peak season in the summer. The locomotive is a 50 ton class B climax with walschaerts valve gear.
- The "Durbin Rocket" (shop number 1059, formerly Moore-Keppel & Co. #3, Middle Fork Railroad #3), of the Durbin and Greenbrier Valley Railroad in Durbin, West Virginia, is hauled by a Climax on its regular excursions. The locomotive is a 55-ton class B with internal Stephenson valve gear.

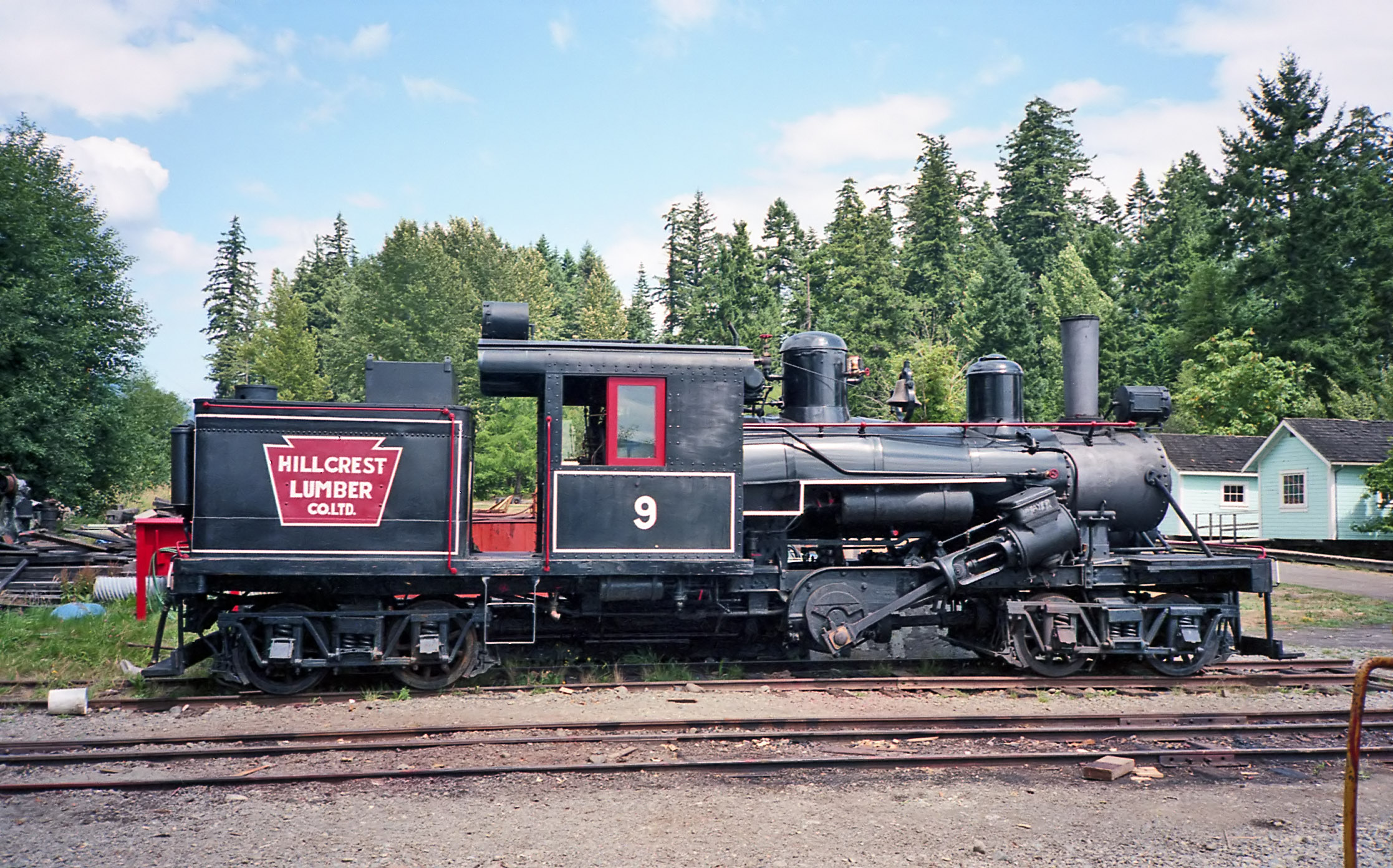
Hillcrest Lumber Co. No. 9, preserved at the BC Forest Discovery Centre, Duncan, British Columbia

- The Corry Area Historical Society's Museum in Corry, Pennsylvania, has a Class B Climax on display in its own exhibit room inside the museum, with the locomotive sitting on a section of track.
- A restored Climax locomotive is on display at the Railroad Museum of Pennsylvania, located in Strasburg. It is displayed beside a Heisler locomotive and a Shay locomotive, which are also fully restored. The locomotives are not in operating condition.
- Two Climax locomotives are preserved in Canada, both at the BC Forest Discovery Centre in Duncan, British Columbia. Shawnigan Lake Lumber Co. No. 2 is a 25-ton Class B locomotive, and was built in 1910 as shop number 1057. Hillcrest Lumber Co. No. 9 was built to a larger, 50-ton Class B design in 1915, and is Climax shop number 1359. Hillcrest Lumber Co. #10, the larger locomotive weighing 70 tons, is currently preserved at Mt. Rainier Scenic Railroad at Elbe, Washington. It is not currently operational and is awaiting work.
- One Climax is located in Roaring Camp And Big Trees Narrow Gauge Railroad, In Felton, California, USA. It is In pieces and as of 2017, its boiler and pistons are operation under its own steam, estimated full restoration in 5 – 10 years.
- Only two Climax Class A locomotives are known to survive today. One was located in Nome, Alaska, before it was acquired 2019-2020, and is currently undergoing restoration in Corry, Pennsylvania. The other, Cabin Creek Lumber Co. #1; was acquired by Oregon Coast Scenic Railroad in 2024 and will be restored to operation.
- One Class B Climax is preserved on the grounds of the Cradle of Forestry in North Carolina.
- Fruit Growers Supply Co. No. 3 is preserved on the grounds of the RailGiants Train Museum, located inside the Los Angeles County Fairgrounds in Pomona, California.

== Conversions ==
Some Climaxes, especially Class A, were later converted to diesel or gasoline power, and some still exist in this form, using the original frame and drive mechanism.
