= Atlantic Avenue (Boston) =

Street in Boston, Massachusetts

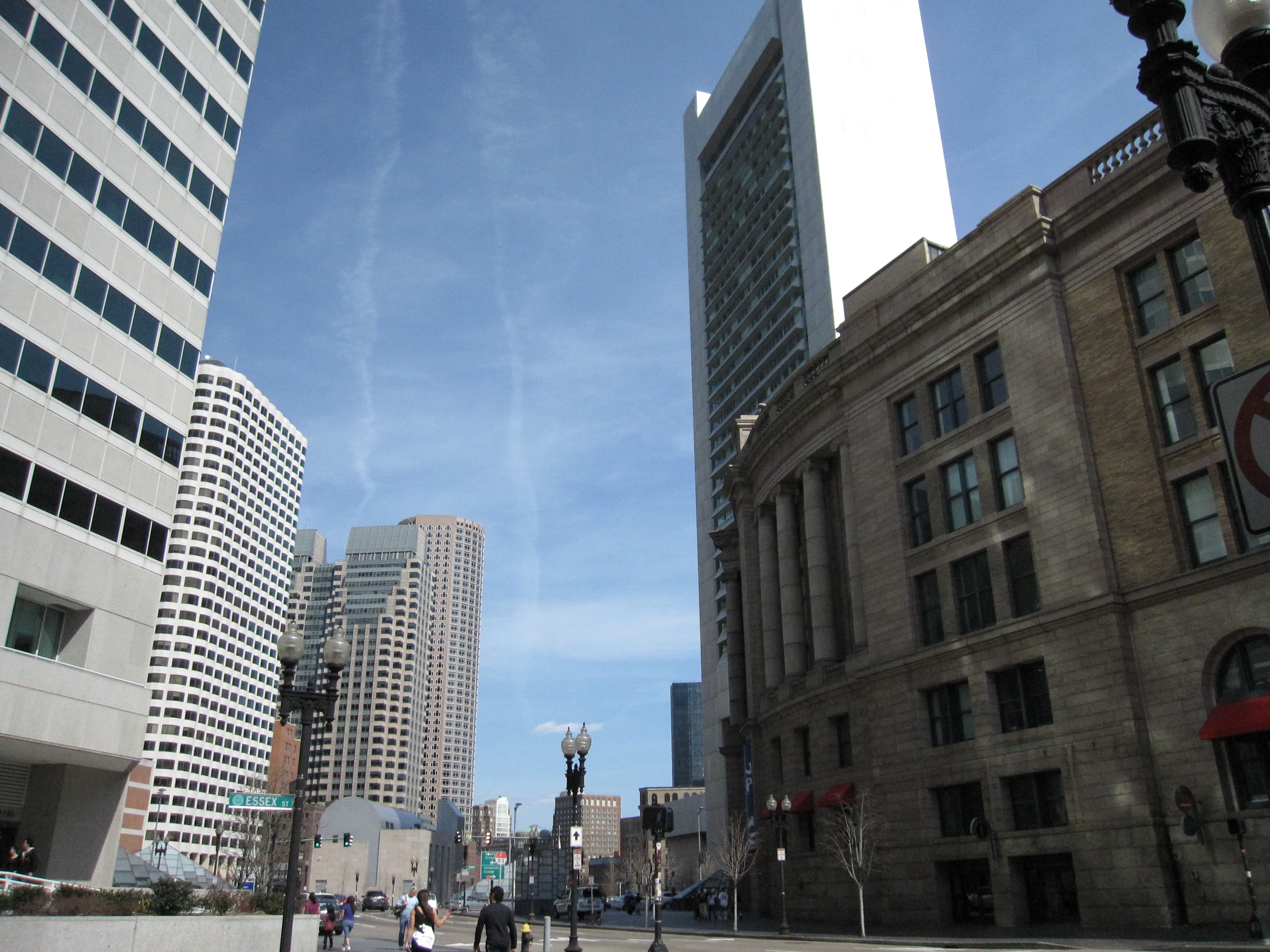
- Atlantic Avenue at Essex St., Boston, 2010
- Interactive map of Atlantic Avenue
- Location: Boston
- South end: Kneeland Street
- Major junctions: I-93 in Boston
- North end: Commercial Street

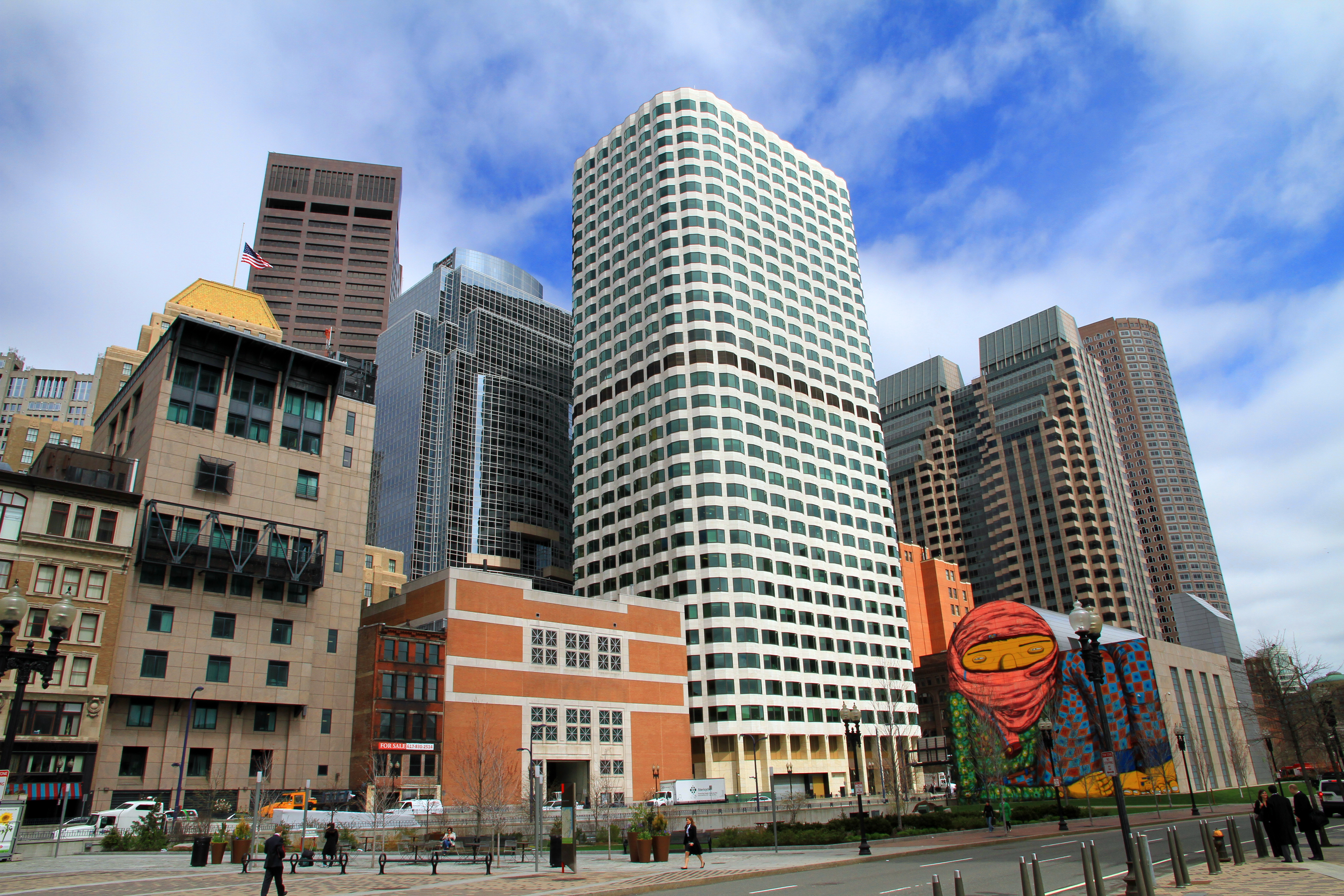
Atlantic Avenue

Atlantic Avenue is a street in downtown Boston, Massachusetts, partly serving as a frontage road for the underground Central Artery (I-93) and partly running along the Boston Harbor. It has a long history, with several relocations along the way.

== History ==
What is now Atlantic Avenue was once part of Broad Street, only existing from the road still known as Broad Street south to Dewey Square (the front of South Station). Federal Street (which now only goes north from Dewey Square) continued south from Dewey Square through the current location of South Station to the Federal Street Bridge (now the Dorchester Street Bridge) and on to South Boston and points south.

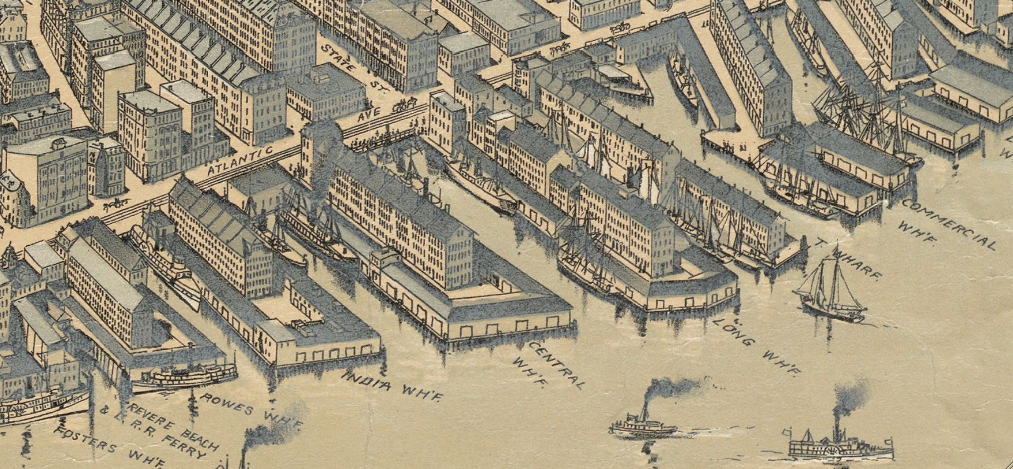
Detail of 1899 map of Boston, showing Atlantic Ave. and vicinity

From 1868 to 1874, the section north of Broad Street was built, taking it into Commercial Street, with which it formed a waterfront route around the North End, and the portion of Broad Street south of the new road was renamed Atlantic Avenue. This new alignment took it across the middle of several former wharves, notably Long Wharf, and the water west of Atlantic Avenue was filled in. The Union Freight Railroad was completed in 1872, taking freight between the lines on the north and south sides of downtown, and running along the middle of the full length of Atlantic Avenue.

In 1899, South Station opened, and as part of that project Federal Street was closed south of Dewey Square, and Atlantic Avenue was extended south along a new alignment on the west side of South Station. The Union Freight Railroad, which had used Federal Street, was also realigned onto the new alignment. Just south of Kneeland Street, the railroad continued straight but Atlantic Avenue had a quick S-curve to shift to the west side of the railroad, where it slowly rose and then turned southeast onto the Atlantic Avenue Viaduct over the full approach to South Station (the Boston and Albany and New York, New Haven and Hartford railroads), which after crossing the railroads immediately turned back to the south and crossed the Fort Point Channel. The road ended at the large intersection of Dorchester Avenue, Foundry Street and West First Street, serving the same purpose as Federal Street - taking vehicles to this intersection from Dewey Square.

The viaduct was gone by 1923, and Atlantic Avenue was truncated to just south of Kneeland Street at the S-curve. Traffic formerly using Atlantic Avenue to South Boston now used Dorchester Avenue around the east side of South Station, or headed west on Kneeland Street and south on Albany Street to one of the other Fort Point Channel crossings.

The next change happened in the 1950s, when the Central Artery (now I-93) was built. From Broad and High Streets south to Dewey Square, Atlantic Avenue was made one-way northbound as a frontage road for the Artery, with southbound traffic using Purchase Street on the other side of the Artery. Atlantic Avenue was kept two-way south of Dewey Square, where through traffic used the Surface Artery.

The Union Freight Railroad was abandoned in 1970, removing tracks from the center of Atlantic Avenue. Soon after, the road was realigned inland from Broad and High Streets most of the way to its north end, where it turned northeast and returned to its original alignment for the final block to Commercial Street, roughly along the old Mercantile and Richmond Streets. A short section of Old Atlantic Avenue exists in the original location between Milk and State Streets.

When the Big Dig put the Artery underground in the late 1990s and early 2000s, the full section along the Artery, as well as the southern end, was converted to one-way northbound, with southbound traffic on the other side, known in sections as Surface Artery, Purchase Street and again Surface Artery. The new northbound tunnel was built under Atlantic Avenue south of Dewey Square. Only the part curving away from the Artery to end at Commercial Street remained two-way. South of Kneeland Street, a ramp from the northbound Artery and its frontage road joins the intersection of Kneeland Street and Atlantic Avenue.

== Railroads and other transportation ==
By 1871, the Dorchester Avenue Railroad ran along Atlantic Avenue south of Broad Street (still called Broad Street at the time) as part of its route between downtown and Dorchester. However, 1872 and 1874 maps show these tracks removed in favor of tracks along Beach Street. An 1888 map appears to show tracks again, along the full length of Atlantic Avenue (ending at the Commercial Street merge), and an 1897 map shows tracks not only on all of Atlantic Avenue but also on Commercial Street towards North Station.

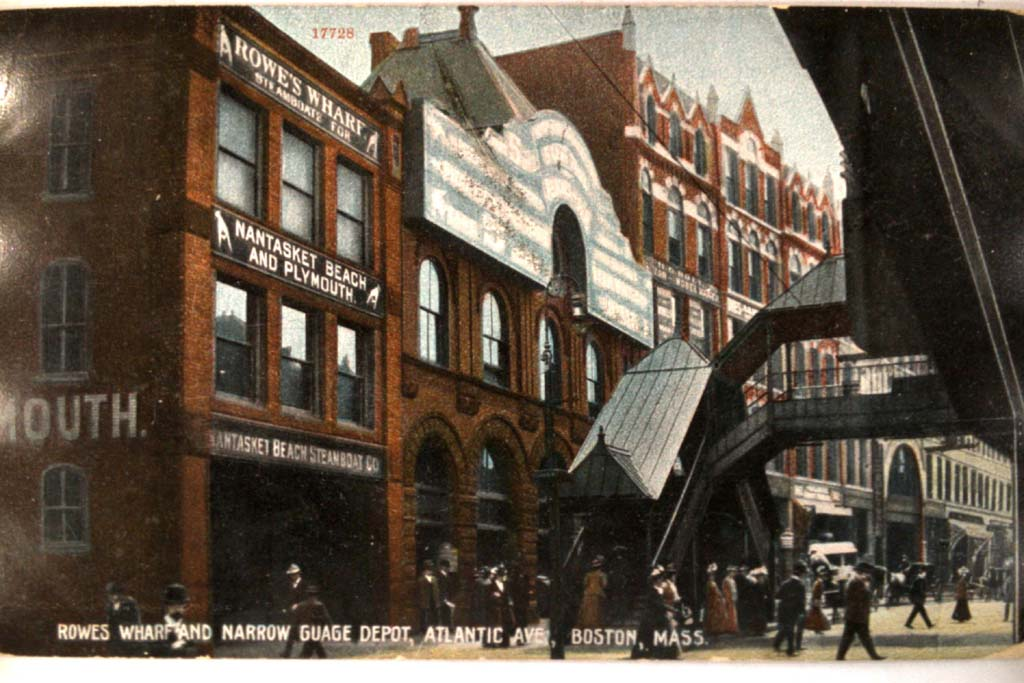
Atlantic Ave., 1909

In 1872, the Union Freight Railroad was built along Atlantic Avenue, connecting freight lines on both sides of downtown. It was removed in 1970. The 1899 extension of Atlantic Avenue also resulted in a realignment of the railroad.

From 1901 to 1938 (torn down in the early 1940s), the Atlantic Avenue Elevated carried passengers above Atlantic Avenue north of Beach Street.

By 1925, all streetcar tracks had been removed from the central part of downtown, and tracks along Atlantic Avenue north of Summer Street (Dewey Square) took streetcars around downtown. These too were gone by 1953.

Buses on the 6 South Station–Haymarket Station via North End route now use the full length of Atlantic Avenue (northbound only along the Big Dig).

None of Atlantic Avenue has ever been part of a numbered state, U.S. or Interstate route.

== See also ==
- India Wharf
- Rose Kennedy Greenway
- Rowes Wharf
