= Mortgage bank =

Bank that specializes in originating and/or servicing mortgage loans

A mortgage bank is a bank that specializes in originating and/or servicing mortgage loans. In the United States, a mortgage bank is a state-licensed banking entity that makes mortgage loans directly to consumers. The difference between a mortgage banker and a mortgage broker is that the mortgage banker funds loans with its own capital.

Generally, a mortgage bank originates a loan and places it on a pre-established warehouse line of credit until the loan can be sold to an investor, which are typically large institutions. The credit risk is typically absorbed by the Agencies, which include Fannie Mae, Freddie Mac, and Ginnie Mae. The process of selling a loan from the mortgage bank to another investor is referred to as selling the loan on the secondary market. This is in contrast to the primary market, which for mortgages typically refers to the bank buying the mortgage deed of trust from the homeowner for the face amount of the loan, adjusted for discount points and other price adjustments.

Mortgage banks sell the loans because the funds received pay down their warehouse lines of credit which enables the mortgage bank to sustain their lending activities. A mortgage bank is not regulated as a federal or state bank and does not take deposits from consumers or businesses. To support their operations, a mortgage bank acquires a certain amount of equity, which is then used to secure the warehouse line. The primary source of funds, however, comes from the warehouse lender.

A mortgage bank can vary in size. Some mortgage banking companies are nationwide. Some may originate a large loan volume, exceeding that of a nationwide commercial bank. Many mortgage banks employ specialty servicers for tasks such as repurchase and fraud discovery work.

Their two primary sources of revenue are loan origination fees and loan servicing fees (provided they are a loan servicer). Many mortgage bankers are opting not to service the loans they originate. By selling them shortly after they are closed and funded, they are eligible to earn a "service released premium". The secondary market investor that buys the loan will earn revenue for the servicing of the loan for each month the loan is kept by the borrower.

Unlike a federally chartered savings bank, a mortgage bank generally specializes only in making mortgage loans. Many do not take deposits from customers and call themselves Mortgage Lenders, to avoid being confused with a typical bank.

A company desiring to enter the mortgage business often chooses to be a mortgage banker vs. a mortgage broker primarily to earn yield spread premiums. Mortgage bankers risk their own capital to fund loans and therefore do not have to disclose the price at which they sell mortgages to another company. Mortgage brokers, on the other hand, earning the same yield spread premium, disclose the additional fee to the consumer because the yield spread premium becomes an additional fee earned and therefore disclosable under federal and state law.

A mortgage bank generally operates within the framework of the diverse banking regulations that are specific to each state in which it conducts its operations.

== History ==
The market share for mortgage banks in the US of single-family mortgage loans went from 20% in 1980 to over 41% in 1991 during the Savings and Loan Crisis.

== See also ==
- Bank
- Capital market
- Collateralized mortgage obligation
- Credit union
- Financial institution
- Loan sale
- Mortgage broker
- Secondary market
