= Wayne Silby =

American social investor & entrepreneur

Wayne Silby (born 1948) is an American social investor and entrepreneur. He is the co-founder of Calvert Investments, one of the first and largest socially responsible mutual funds in the nation, and has been acting as the Founding Chairman until his recent retirement.

He is considered to be one of the early pioneers in the field of impact investing. In addition to Calvert Investments, he has been the founding chair of several other notable impact investing groups such as Calvert Impact Capital, ImpactAssets, Calvert Social Venture Partners, and Social Venture Network.

== Early life ==
Silby was born Donald Wayne Silby in Iowa in 1948.

He earned a B.S. in Economics from the Wharton School of the University of Pennsylvania and a J.D. from the Georgetown University Law Center.

After his first year of law school, he spent 18 months hitchhiking through Africa and India, a transformative experience which piqued his curiosity about developing economies and ultimately inspired him to infuse business practices with a spiritual and social dimension.

== Career ==
=== Calvert ===
In 1976, just out of law school, Silby co-founded Calvert Fund with John Guffey, his classmate from Wharton. The fund was the first money market fund to use government sponsored floating rate note to achieve high returns with added safety; it managed more than $1 billion in assets by 1982.

After attending a Buddhist conference entitled "Right Livelihood," Silby was inspired in 1982 to co-found Calvert Social Investment Fund (CSIF), the first socially responsible mutual fund. Under his leadership, Calvert Social Investment Fund was the first fund to set aside 1% of its assets to be deployed at below market rates to further issues of social justice. It was also the first fund to oppose apartheid by divesting from South Africa, and in 1994, it was the first fund to reinvest in free South Africa. Also, it was the first fund to file shareholder resolutions to hold companies accountable to their stakeholder mission, which included issues of gender and racial parity in boardrooms.

Calvert currently manages $20 billion in assets. Silby retired as the Chairman of the board when Calvert was sold to Eaton Vance in 2017.

=== Calvert Impact Capital ===
Silby and Guffey co-founded the non-profit Calvert Impact Capital (aka. Calvert Foundation) in 1987, whose mission is to help direct social investors to community needs by leveraging the Calvert operational infrastructure. Calvert Impact Capital was approved as a community development financial institution (CDFI) by the United States Department of the Treasury in 2000. Assets of this Note loan program are now in excess of $500 million.

=== ImpactAssets ===
Silby co-founded ImpactAssets, a donor-advised fund, in 1999 with Ron Cortes and Tim Freundlich. Its assets recently exceeded $1 billion.

=== Social Venture Network ===
Silby, together with Joshua Mailman, co-founded the Social Venture Network in 1987 with the goal of creating a community of entrepreneurs and investors committed to using business as a tool for social change.

=== GroupServe ===
In 1983, Silby met software architects Peter and Trudy Johnson-Lenz, who coined the term "groupware" and formed Groupware Systems, one of the first collaborative softwares utilizing the then newly-introduced Internet. The company folded in 1986, and Silby made a second attempt in 1999 by launching GroupServe, which collapsed during the bursting of the dot-com bubble in 2001.

=== Work in China ===
Silby has been particularly active in trying to bring corporate social responsibility into China. Under his supervision, Calvert became a founding investor and advisor to the pioneering China Environment Fund in the late 1990s.

In 2004, he recruited Guo Peiyuan to co-found Syntao, Ltd, a Chinese consulting firm in the area of corporate social responsibility. In 2019, Syntao Green Finance was spun off from Syntao with Moody's Corporation as a strategic investor. Beginning in 2007, Silby chaired the China Committee of the Grameen Foundation and helped introduce microfinance to China including legal reviews in meetings with the current Chairman of the People's Bank of China, Yi Gang. He was a founding board member of China Alliance of Social Value Investors (CASVI).

In 2015, Silby co-founded Zenflo, a mindfulness, floatation tank center in Beijing, with the goal of bringing Silicon Valley transformational neuroscience technologies to advance the mindfulness experience.

Silby is currently an advisory board member to the George H.W. Bush Foundation for U.S. China Relations.

== Personal life ==
Silby splits his time between Beijing and Washington, D.C., and spends his summers at his beach cabin in Cortes Island.

He is a member of the Synergos Global Philanthropy Circle.

== Distinctions ==
- Joseph Wharton Award for Social Impact, 2013
- Lead author, Impact Investing: Frontier Stories, MIT Press Journals, 2011
