= 1620 L Street =

Coordinates: 38.903357°N 77.037635°W

- Interactive map of the 1620 L Street area

General information
- Type: Office
- Location: 1620 L Street NW, Washington, D.C., United States
- Completed: 1989
- Opening: 1990

Height
- Roof: 157 ft (48 m)

Technical details
- Floor count: 12
- Floor area: 176,464 sq ft (16,394.0 m^{2})
- Lifts/elevators: 5

Design and construction
- Architects: Smith, Segreti, Tepper, McMahon & Harned

1620 L Street is a high-rise building in Washington, D.C. The building rises 12 floors and 157 feet (48 m) in height. The building was designed by architectural firm Smith, Segreti, Tepper, McMahon & Harned and was completed in 1989. As of July 2008, the structure stands as the 24th-tallest building in the city, tied in rank with 1111 19th Street, 1333 H Street, 1000 Connecticut Avenue, the Republic Building, 1010 Mass, the Army and Navy Club Building and the Watergate Hotel and Office Building. 1620 L Street is an example of postmodern architecture, and has a glass and granite facade. It is composed almost entirely of office space, with 512,000 square feet (48,000 m^{2}) of commercial area; the three basement levels are used as parking space, containing a 126-spot parking garage. The street level floor is used for commercial retailing.

== See also ==
- List of tallest buildings in Washington, D.C.
