= 1111 19th Street =

High-rise office building in Washington, D.C.

Coordinates: 38.904209°N 77.043064°W

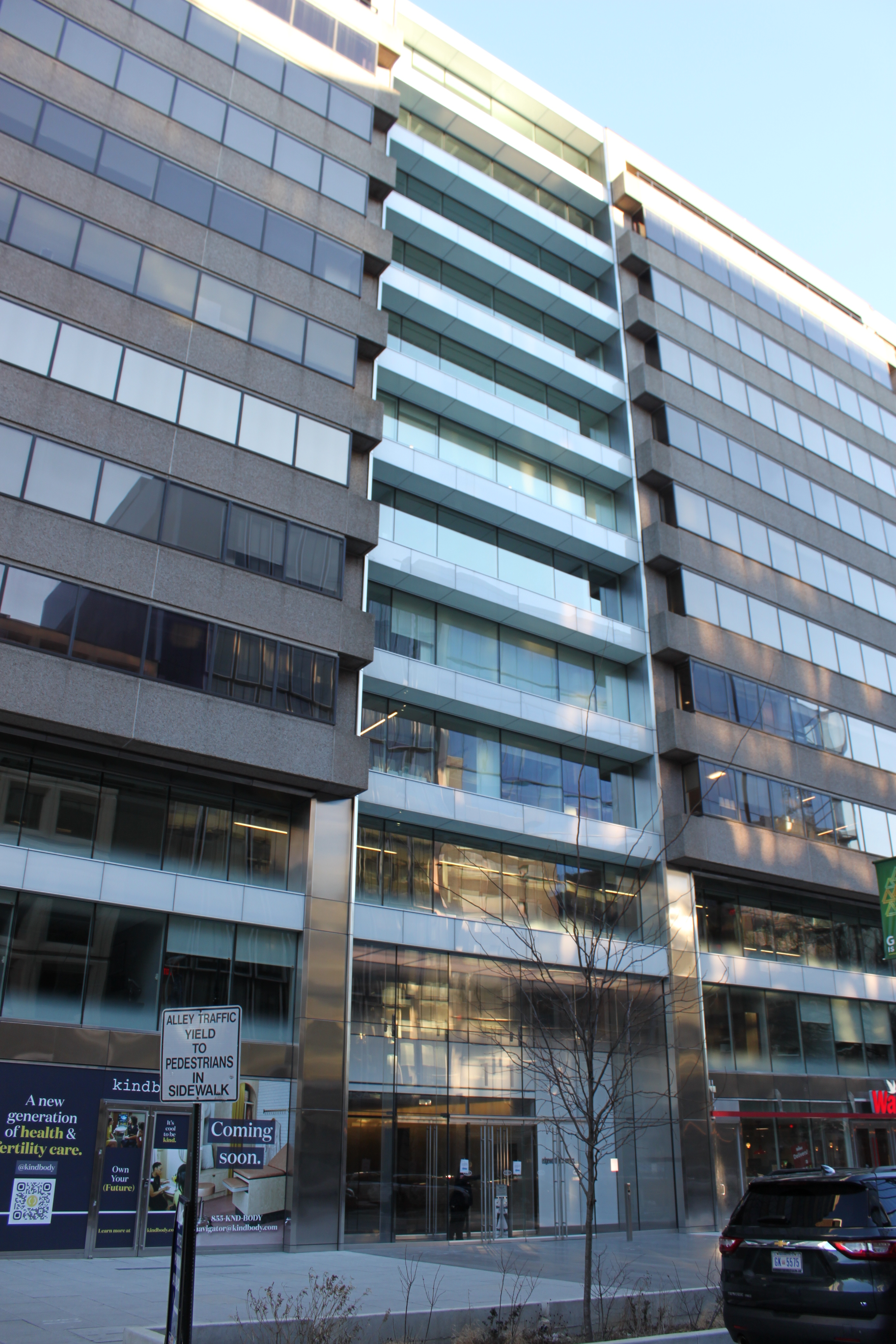
- 1111 19th Street (center building), in 2022
- Interactive map of the 1111 19th Street area

General information
- Type: Office
- Location: 1111 19th Street NW, Washington, D.C., United States
- Completed: 1979
- Opening: 1979

Height
- Roof: 157 ft (48 m)

Technical details
- Floor count: 12
- Floor area: 263,000 sq ft (24,400 m^{2})
- Lifts/elevators: 6

Design and construction
- Architect: Heery International

1111 19th Street is a high-rise office building in Washington, D.C. The building rises 12 floors and 157 feet (48 m) in height. The building was designed by architectural firm Heery International and was completed in 1979. As of July 2008, the structure stands as the 24th-tallest building in the city, tied in rank with 1620 L Street, 1333 H Street, 1000 Connecticut Avenue, The Republic Building, 1010 Mass, the Army and Navy Club Building and the Watergate Hotel and Office Building. 1111 19th Street is an example of modern architecture, and is composed almost entirely of office space, with 263,000 square feet (24,000 m^{2}) of commercial area; the three basement levels are used as parking space, containing a 278-spot parking garage.

== See also ==
- List of tallest buildings in Washington, D.C.
