= Army and Navy Club (Washington, D.C.) =

Organization in United States

Army & Navy Club
- Formation: 1885; 141 years ago
- Type: Private Social Club
- Tax ID no.: 53-0028710
- Headquarters: 901 17th Street NW, Washington DC
- Website: Official website

Army and Navy Club Building
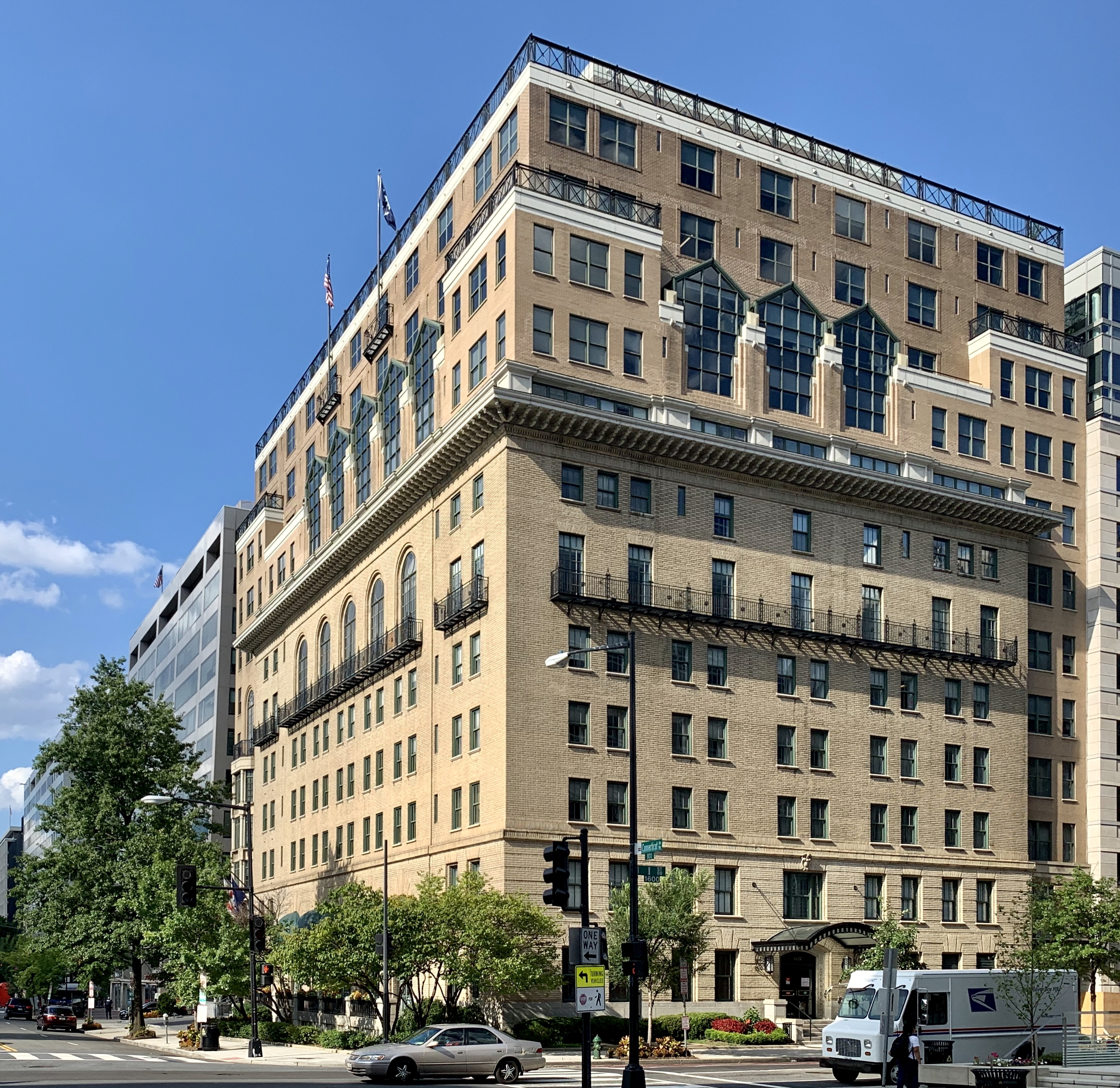
- Army and Navy Club Building in August 2020
- Interactive map of the Army and Navy Club Building area

General information
- Type: Mixed use
- Location: 1627 I Street NW; Washington, D.C. United States
- Coordinates: 38°54′05″N 77°02′18″W
- Completed: August 9, 1912; 113 years ago
- Renovated: 1987

Height
- Roof: 157 ft (48 m)

Technical details
- Floor count: 12
- Floor area: 337,000 sq ft (31,300 m^{2})
- Lifts/elevators: 3

Design and construction
- Architects: Hornblower & Marshall, with construction supervision by Albert L. Harris; Shalom Baranes Associates PC (1987 renovation)

The Army and Navy Club (ANC) is a private club located at 901 17th Street NW, Washington, D.C. The Army and Navy Club Building is one of the tallest buildings in the city of Washington.

== History ==
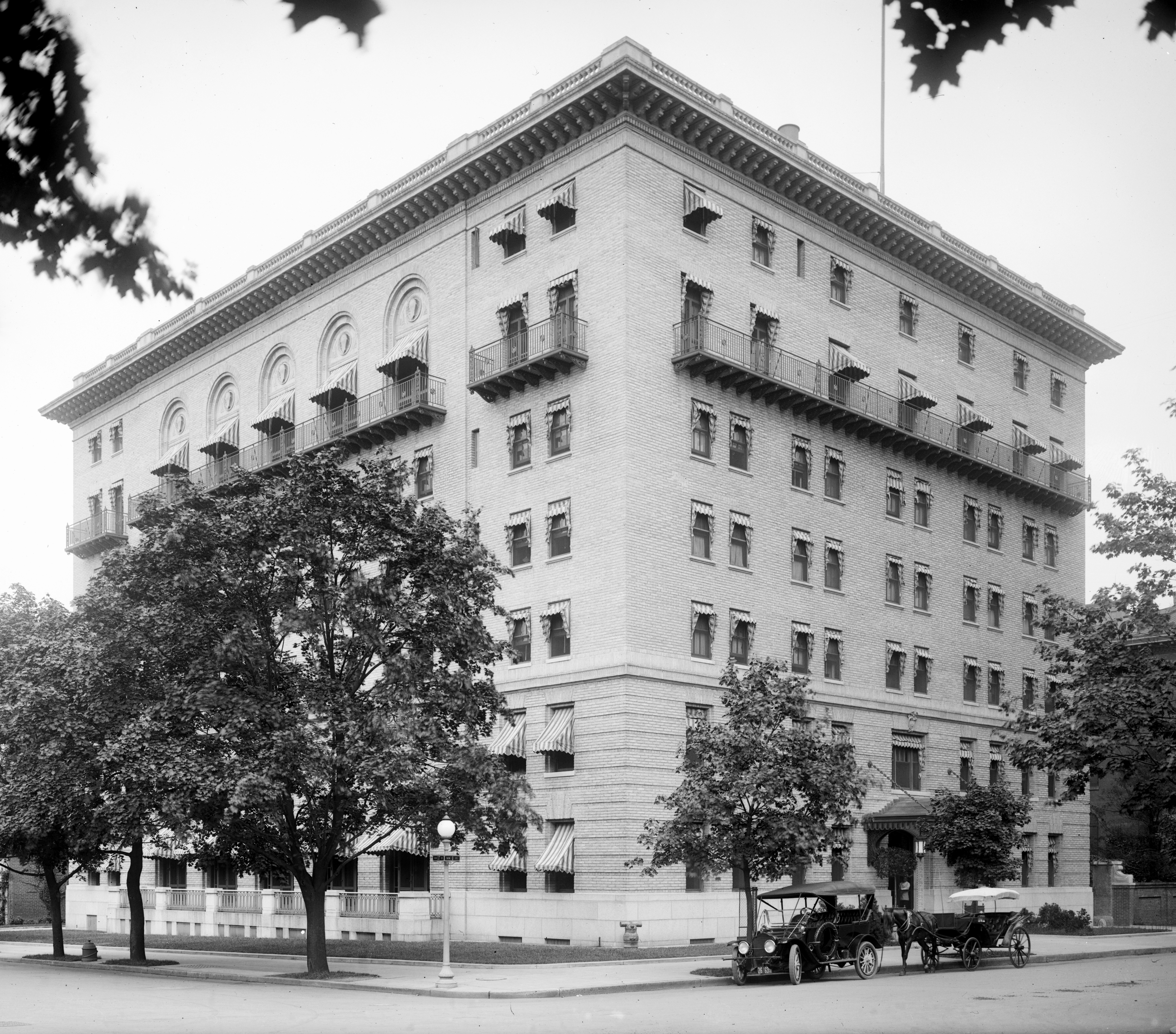
Army and Navy Club Building in 1915

The club was founded in December 1885 as the United Service Club. At the time, membership was limited to officers who had served during wartime. It had a few rooms in a building at the corner of F and 14th streets NW. A few years later, it extended its membership eligibility to all officers and ex-officers of the Army, Navy, and Marines.

The club changed its name to The Army and Navy Club in 1891. Its building was designed by Hornblower & Marshall and the construction was supervised by Albert L. Harris. The building was completed and officially opened on August 9, 1912.

In the mid-1980s, the interior of the building was gutted, although the facade was retained and the original chandeliers were saved. The building was also expanded with a high-rise section, and the work on the building was completed in February 1987. The expanded Club's dedication ceremony was scheduled for January 7, 1988, but it was delayed due to a snowstorm that dropped 10 inches of snow on the city. The dedication ceremony was rescheduled for on January 12, 1988, at which time President Ronald Reagan formally dedicated the building.

== Building and facilities ==
The Army and Navy Club Library is one of the oldest private libraries in the District of Columbia. The library has close to 20,000 volumes and provides an outstanding source of information on military history and the latest news.

The club includes dining rooms, guest rooms, meeting rooms, squash facilities, and a gym.

The building is a high-rise building, at least in Washington, D.C. The building rises 12 floors and 157 feet (48 m) in height. As of July 2008, the structure stands as the 24th-tallest building in the city, tied in rank with 1620 L Street, 1333 H Street, 1000 Connecticut Avenue, the Republic Building, 1010 Mass, 1111 19th Street and The Watergate Hotel and Office Building. It was formerly a seven-story building, completed in 1912. The additions to the original building were designed by architectural firm Shalom Baranes Associates and was completed in 1987. The Army and Navy Club Building is an example of modern architecture, and is classified as a mixed use building; it is composed mostly of office space, with 337,000 square feet (31,000 m^{2}) of commercial area, but also contains a clubhouse for The Army and Navy Club that includes a conference center, restaurant, hotel rooms and fitness center. The three basement levels are used as parking space, containing a 177-lot parking garage.

== Notable members ==
- William Herbert Bixby
- Carl Rogers Darnall
- William Fullam
- Frank L. Greene
- Charles Willauer Kutz
- John Porter Merrell
- Wilds P. Richardson
- Cornelius V. S. Roosevelt
- John Schofield (first president of the club)
- Charles Brewster Wheeler
- Robert Wynne

== See also ==
- List of tallest buildings in Washington, D.C.
