= Certified mortgage planner =

In the United States certified mortgage planner is a designation for the purpose of establishing a new professional category in the mortgage sector: one that arose as a response to criticisms of the mortgage banking industry. The term "mortgage planner" has been adopted as a generic niche term for mortgage originators who choose to assist borrowers on a more personal level by incorporating the mortgage decision with a borrowers short and long-term financial objectives. The term "certified mortgage planner" is an effort to validate through education and subsequent certification a mortgage originator that has had specific training for the purpose of incorporating the mortgage decision with a Borrowers short and long-term financial objectives.

== Origins of the term ==
The terms certified mortgage planning and certified mortgage planner were first used by the NAMP (National Association of Mortgage Professionals). The term Mortgage Planner was first coined by Tim Hester to mark a clear distinction between the new approach to mortgage origination and the existing practices encompassed by mortgage brokering.

The effort to create a certification process around the mortgage planning concept was stemmed from those within the mortgage industry desiring to combat the negative effects of the mortgage industry having been commoditized.

Proponents of mortgage planning, such as NAMP, argue that mortgage brokers have no fiduciary obligation to the consumer and are essentially independent contractors. This is in contrast to other related occupations, such as financial advisors and real estate agents, where agency is more clearly defined.

While mortgage brokering license requirements do exist, they are maintained on a state level, and enforcement is often difficult. This factor, in conjunction with the rise in unconventional mortgage products between 1999 and 2006, has led to some brokers taking advantage of unsuspecting consumers.

== Tools of the trade ==
The mortgage planner uses many tools in his practice, which in conjunction with their education allow them to create a "mortgage plan" for their client. These tools often include, but are not limited to, advanced software to compare mortgage products in a side be side comparison, credit scoring services to determine the best way to help a client to qualify for a particular program, and additional financial or debt management programs which create additional options for the client and the mortgage planner to use to achieve their goals.
