= L&C Mortgages =

- Trade name: L&C; L&C Mortgages
- Type: Private
- Industry: Mortgage broking
- Founded: Mid-1980s
- Headquarters: Bath, United Kingdom
- Number of locations: Bath; Newcastle
- Area served: United Kingdom
- Key people: Phil Rickards (Chairman)
- Products: Mortgage advice
- Number of employees: 350 mortgage advisers and 90 protection advisers (April 2025)
- Website: https://www.landc.co.uk/

L&C Mortgages (also known as London and Country Mortgages Limited) is a UK mortgage broking company headquartered in Bath with a second office in Newcastle. They are one of the largest and best-known national mortgage brokers with 350 mortgage and 90 protection advisers as of April 2025, and are a certified B Corp company.

== History ==
London & Country Mortgages was first established as a mortgage subsidiary of Chase de Vere Investments in the mid-1980s. The original idea behind London & Country had been to service the mortgage enquiries generated by Chase de Vere Investments’ clients, however after a number of years it was scaled up and became a business in its own right. They achieved this by engaging with the national press to provide commentary and best buy table data, which helped to generate enquiries from customers seeking mortgage advice all over the UK and fitted well with a key part of their business model of providing advice over the phone.

London & Country became an independent business in January 1997, though remained part of the Chase de Vere holding company until it was sold in 2000 to Michael Edge as part of the acquisition of Chase de Vere Investments by Bank of Ireland. Global information services group Experian later acquired a minority stake in L&C in 2017, with chairman Mike Edge remaining the majority shareholder and a significant portion of equity remaining with L&C’s management and employees.

London & Country has been authorised by the Financial Services Authority and then the Financial Conduct Authority since 1st December 2001, with trading names L&C since 14th June 2005 and L&C Mortgages since 2nd December 2019.

In 2012 they expanded to a second office location in Newcastle, the northern hub giving L&C a greater regional spread across the UK and the ability to recruit a number of young graduates due to the universities in the area.

L&C launched their first major national TV advert campaign in 2017, and their second TV advert campaign in 2018 narrated by TV personality David Mitchell.

In September 2025 L&C submitted their 1 millionth mortgage application, a milestone they marked by participating in the Circuit of Bath walk to raise money for homelessness charity Julian House.

== Media coverage and commentary ==
L&C Mortgages is referred to in national media for its commentary on developments in the UK mortgage market. During the period of market volatility following the September 2022 mini-budget, associate director of L&C Mortgages David Hollingworth was quoted by The Guardian discussing short-term uncertainty in mortgage rates and the likelihood of continued volatility for borrowers.

The company was again cited by The Guardian in August 2024 in coverage examining how borrowers could identify competitive mortgage interest rate deals, where L&C Mortgages was referenced as a mortgage broker providing market insight and guidance to consumers.

The Telegraph has also included commentary from L&C Mortgages in its reporting on changes in mortgage pricing, including analysis of new five-year fixed-rate mortgage products entering the market following shifts in interest rate expectations. The article quoted an L&C Mortgages representative commenting on the impact of market conditions on mortgage pricing and borrower behaviour.
