= 1333 H Street =

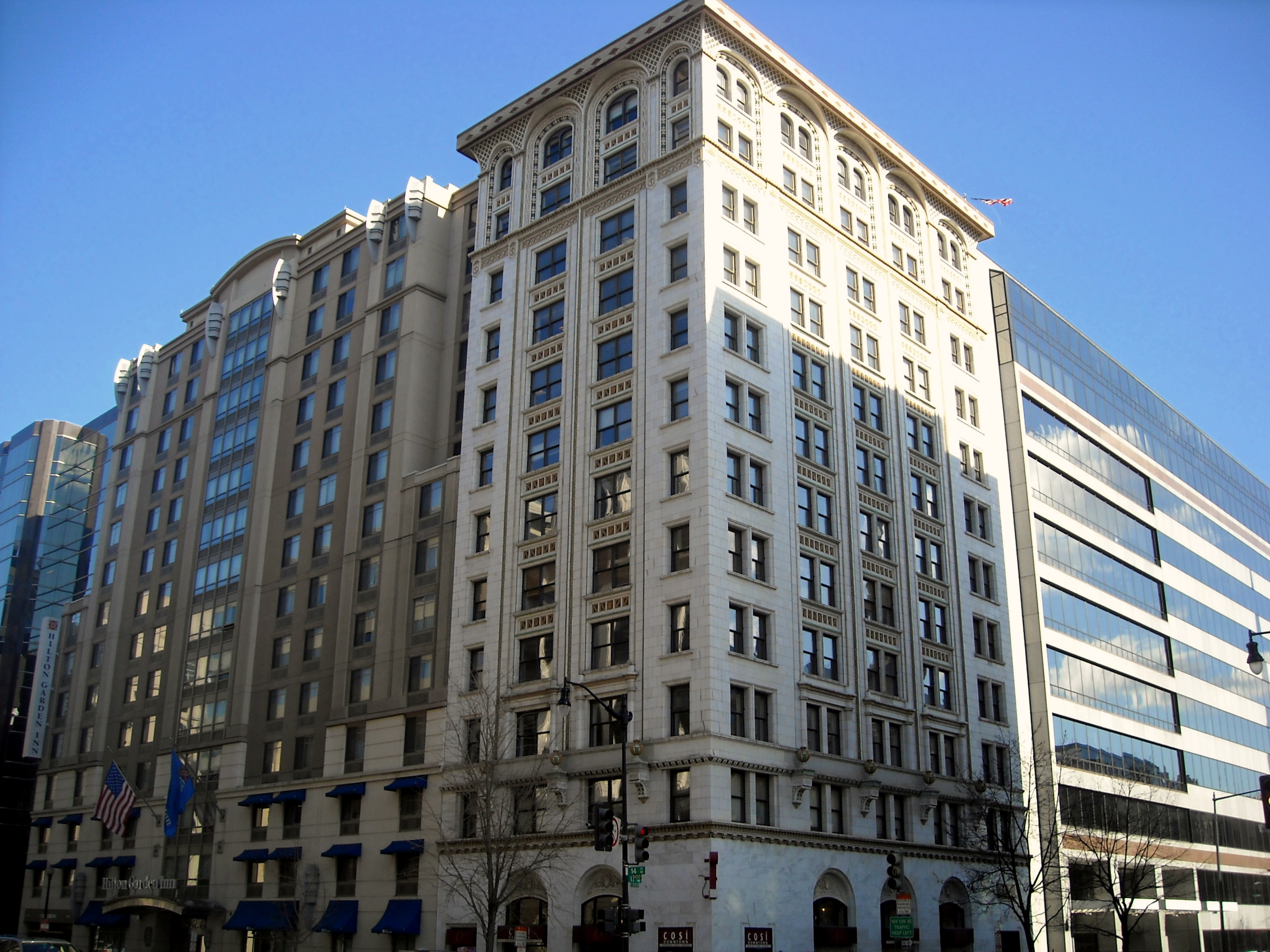
- The West Tower of 1333 H Street
- Interactive map of the 1333 H Street area

General information
- Status: Completed
- Type: Commercial office
- Location: 1333 H Street NW, Washington, D.C., United States
- Coordinates: 38.900373°N 77.031047°W
- Completed: 1912 (west tower); 1982 (east tower)
- Opening: 1912 (west tower); 1982 (east tower)
- Renovated: 2017

Height
- Roof: 157 ft (48 m)

Technical details
- Floor count: 12
- Floor area: 269,151 sq ft (25,004.9 m^{2})
- Lifts/elevators: 12

1333 H Street NW is a high-rise building in Northwest Washington, D.C. The building rises 12 floors and 157 feet (48 m) in height.

The building is ranked 28th on the list of tallest buildings in Washington, D.C., tied in rank with 1620 L Street, 1010 Mass, 1000 Connecticut Avenue, the Republic Building, 1111 19th Street, the Army and Navy Club Building and the hotel/office building of the Watergate complex.

== History ==
1333 H Street NW contains two connected buildings; the older west tower and the more recent east tower that was built in 1912 and 1982, respectively. Therefore, they have different architectural styles; the west tower exemplifies Beaux-Arts architecture, while the east tower is an example of modern architecture. Additionally, the building's entire facade incorporates glass, granite, and limestone as its material.

=== Ownership ===
The first owner of the building was George Washington University. In 2008, it was bought by Miller Global Properties LLC, co-chaired by Myron Miller and Eyal Ofer of Global Holdings, which acquired it for $130.7 million or about $486 per square foot. It sold the office to the MRP Realty and Rockpoint Group in 2014. After less than a half year ownership, the company sold the building for $162.5 million to TA Realty, a company under Rockefeller Group in late 2015. Following the acquisition, the building was renovated in 2017. The renovation project included the new lobby, facade, and transition change between the towers. It was overseen by the previous owner, MRP Realty and managed by Davis Construction.

== Tenants ==
The structure is composed almost entirely of office space, with 802,500 square feet (75,000 m^{2}) of commercial area; the lower levels contain parking spaces and retail. Tenants include the Center for American Progress, Pivotal Ventures by Melinda Gates, the Institute for International Finance, Reuters, and Democracy Forward, among others.

== See also ==
- List of tallest buildings in Washington, D.C.
