= Debt Exchange =

American specialty finance company

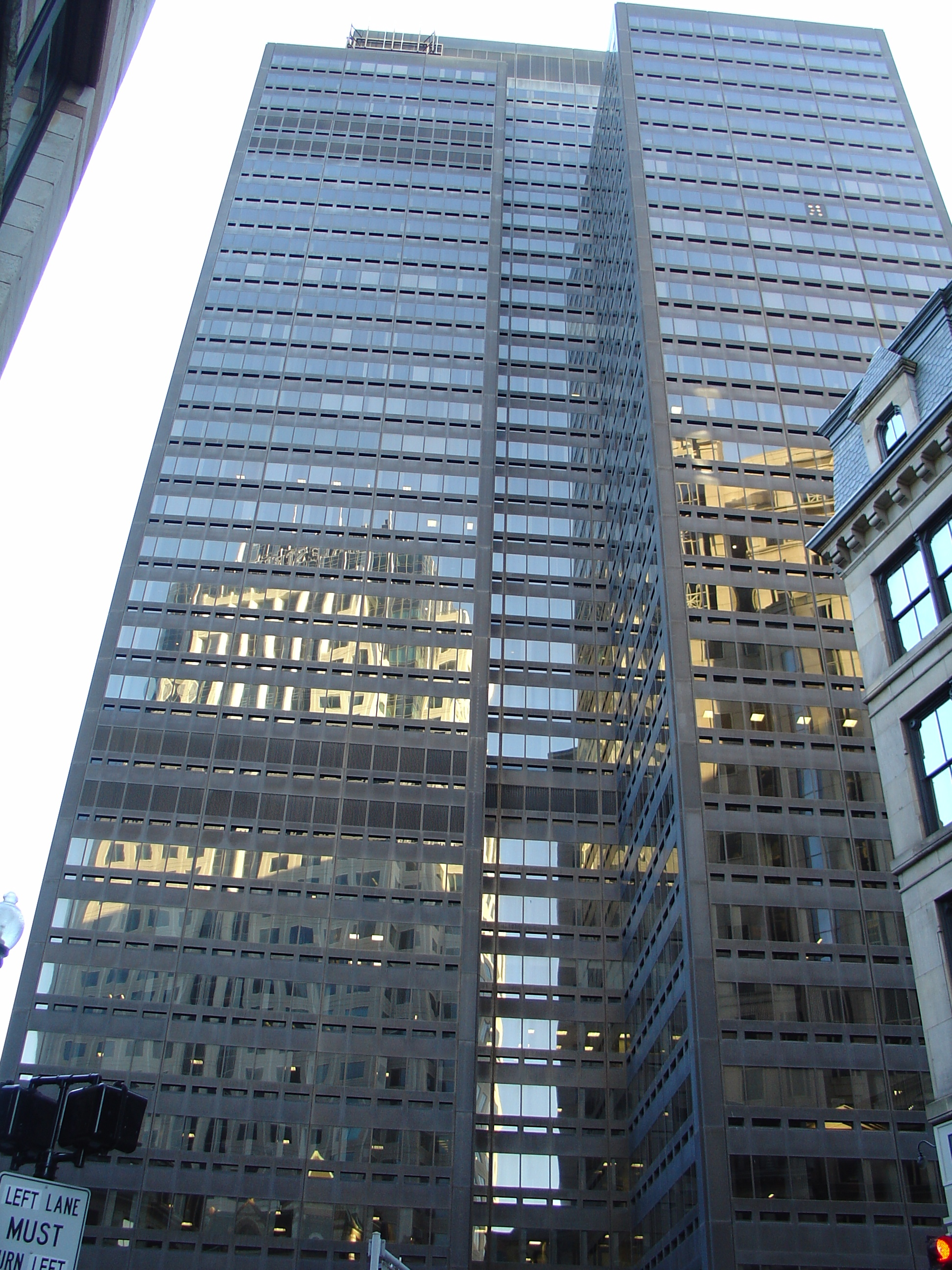
- DebtX headquarters at 100 Summer Street in Boston, MA
- Company type: Private
- Industry: Financial services
- Founded: 2000
- Headquarters: Boston, Massachusetts, U.S.
- Website: www.debtx.com

The Debt Exchange, Inc. (also known as DebtX), is an American specialty finance company. It is one of the world's largest loan sale advisers for the sale of commercial, consumer and specialty finance debt.

== History ==
Founded in 2000, DebtX began by selling loans in an online auction format. A dedicated online marketplace is operated for this purpose. Banks use the platform to unload low-performing loans or to trim loans prior to an acquisition.

Since its founding, DebtX has expanded to offer other products and services including loan valuation, analytics and CECL solutions as well as web-based deal management platforms for use by syndication, agency and loan sale professionals. According to its website, DebtX prices nearly $1 trillion in loans per month.

In 2006 and 2009, The Debt Exchange was awarded patent numbers 7,035,820 and 7,584,139, respectively, by the United States Patent and Trademark Office for its online loan sale and debt trading exchange system. In 2014, DebtX was awarded a third U.S. Patent No. 8,639,614 for its DXSyndicate product.

Aside from financial institutions, the U.S. government also uses DebtX. During the 2008 financial crisis, the U.S. Federal Deposit Insurance Corporation (FDIC) used DebtX as one of the primary companies to sell loans from failed banks. In July 2020, assets seized by the government from drug traffickers worth $366 million were auctioned.

By 2010, Debt Exchange had expanded its operations in Latin America.

The Debt Exchange is based in the Financial District of Boston, Massachusetts, with additional U.S. offices in New York City, Atlanta, and San Francisco, and European offices in Germany, Spain, Italy, and the United Kingdom. It previously also had an office in McLean, Virginia.

== See also ==
- Loan sale
- Secondary market
- Market liquidity
- Capital market
- Financial technology
