= Republic Building (Washington, D.C.) =

- Interactive map of the Republic Building area

General information
- Type: Office
- Location: 1425 New York Avenue NW, Washington, D.C., United States
- Coordinates: 38.8993663°N 77.0325762°W
- Completed: 1991
- Opening: 1991

Height
- Roof: 157 ft (48 m)

Technical details
- Floor count: 13

Design and construction
- Architect: Smith McMahon Architects

The Republic Building is a high-rise building in Washington, D.C. The building rises 13 floors and 157 feet (48 m) in height. It was designed by architectural firm Smith McMahon Architects, and was completed in 1991. As of July 2008, the structure stands as the 24th-tallest building in the city, tied in rank with 1620 L Street, 1333 H Street, 1000 Connecticut Avenue, 1111 19th Street, 1010 Mass, the Army and Navy Club Building and the Watergate Hotel and Office Building. The Republic Building is composed entirely of commercial office space.

== See also ==
- List of tallest buildings in Washington, D.C.
