= Warehouse bank =

Type of bank account

A warehouse bank account is a bank account at a regular commercial bank in which all clients’ funds are commingled or pooled, for the purpose of concealing the client's ownership of the funds.

== Financial crime ==
Fraud can happen when a commercial bank loans indefinitely to a smaller mortgage lending company without enough fail-safes in place, as was the case when Trust One Mortgage owner and operator Brady Bunte committed financial crimes with a scheme he devised. As Trey Garrison of Housingwire.com writes, "From March 2007 through November 2008, Bunte caused Trust One to submit fraudulent funding requests on its warehouse line of credit to National City Bank. The fraudulent funding request caused National City Bank to incur a loss of $12,744,678.16."

== See also ==
- Tax avoidance and tax evasion
- Warehouse line of credit
