= Two International Place =

Skyscraper in Boston, Massachusetts

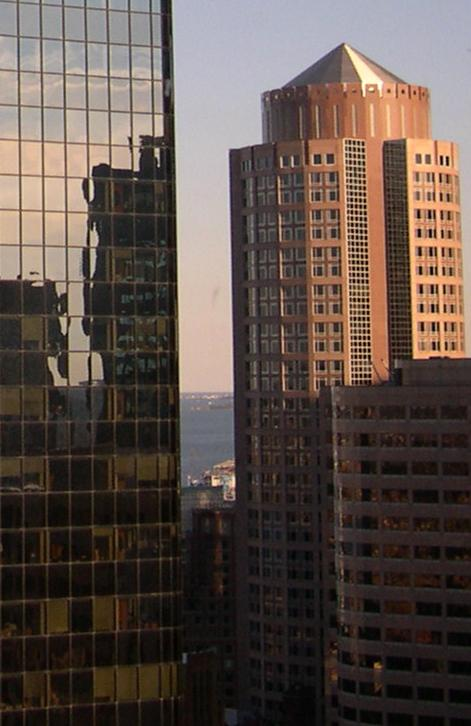
- Two International Place reflected in the walls of Exchange Place

General information
- Type: Office/Retail
- Location: 2 International Place, Boston, Massachusetts, United States
- Coordinates: 42.356492°N 71.051757°W
- Completed: 1992

Height
- Roof: 538 ft (164 m)

Technical details
- Floor count: 36

Design and construction
- Architect: Johnson/Burgee Architects
- Developer: The Chiofaro Company

Website
- International Place

Two International Place is a Postmodern skyscraper in the Financial District of Boston, Massachusetts. The site is located on a site formerly known as Fort Hill. It is located blocks from the North End, the waterfront, South Station, Downtown Crossing, and the Federal Courthouse. The building was designed by Johnson/Burgee Architects – whose principals are Philip Johnson and John Burgee – and completed in 1992. It is Boston's 14th-tallest building, standing 538 feet (164 m) tall.

== Design and features ==
=== Exterior ===
It consists of a 36-story tower and 13-story annex. It is one of the towers in a complex of five structures, anchored by two towers. The facades are constructed of unpolished rose-granite panels with punched aluminum framed and fixed in-place window openings. Windows are a take on tripartite windows but whose lunettes, or arched portions, are fake. A portion of both towers consists of an aluminum framed curtain wall system with a combination of reflective vision glass and spandrel glass. Elaborate classical lighting fixtures are located on exterior. The building's crown consists of an octagonal-based pyramid surrounded by a ring rising out of the tower and partially up the pyramid. This crown is illuminated at night.

=== Interior ===
The Court, located at the center of the complex, features a rain fountain and provides a 25,000 square feet (2,300 m^{2}) retail and café area with restaurants, shops and business services. This court links all the buildings in the complex. Lobby areas feature distinctive imported marble and granite from Spain, Italy and Africa. The interior minimizes columns, greatly enhancing space efficiency and providing work locations with panoramic views. There is secured underground parking with over 800 spaces. There are 38 high-speed passenger elevators and four freight elevators.

== Development and maintenance ==
Project Team

- General Contractor - Turner Construction
- Architects – Philip Johnson and John Burgee
- Developers – Donald Chiofaro and Theodore Oatis, partners in The Chiofaro Company
- Equity partner – Prudential Real Estate Investors (PREI)
- Venture Capital partner – The Hillman Company
- Consulting Engineers – McNamara/Salvia, Inc.
- Lighting Consultant- Claude R. Engle
- Mechanized earth work and Excavation – A.A. Will Corporation, A.A. Will Corporation
- Elevators – Fujitec America, Inc. (Boston)
- Building Maintenance Systems – MANNTECH

== See also ==
- List of tallest buildings in Boston
- One International Place
