= Financial District, Boston =

Coordinates: 42.3571°N 71.0557°W

Financial District
- Neighborhood of Boston
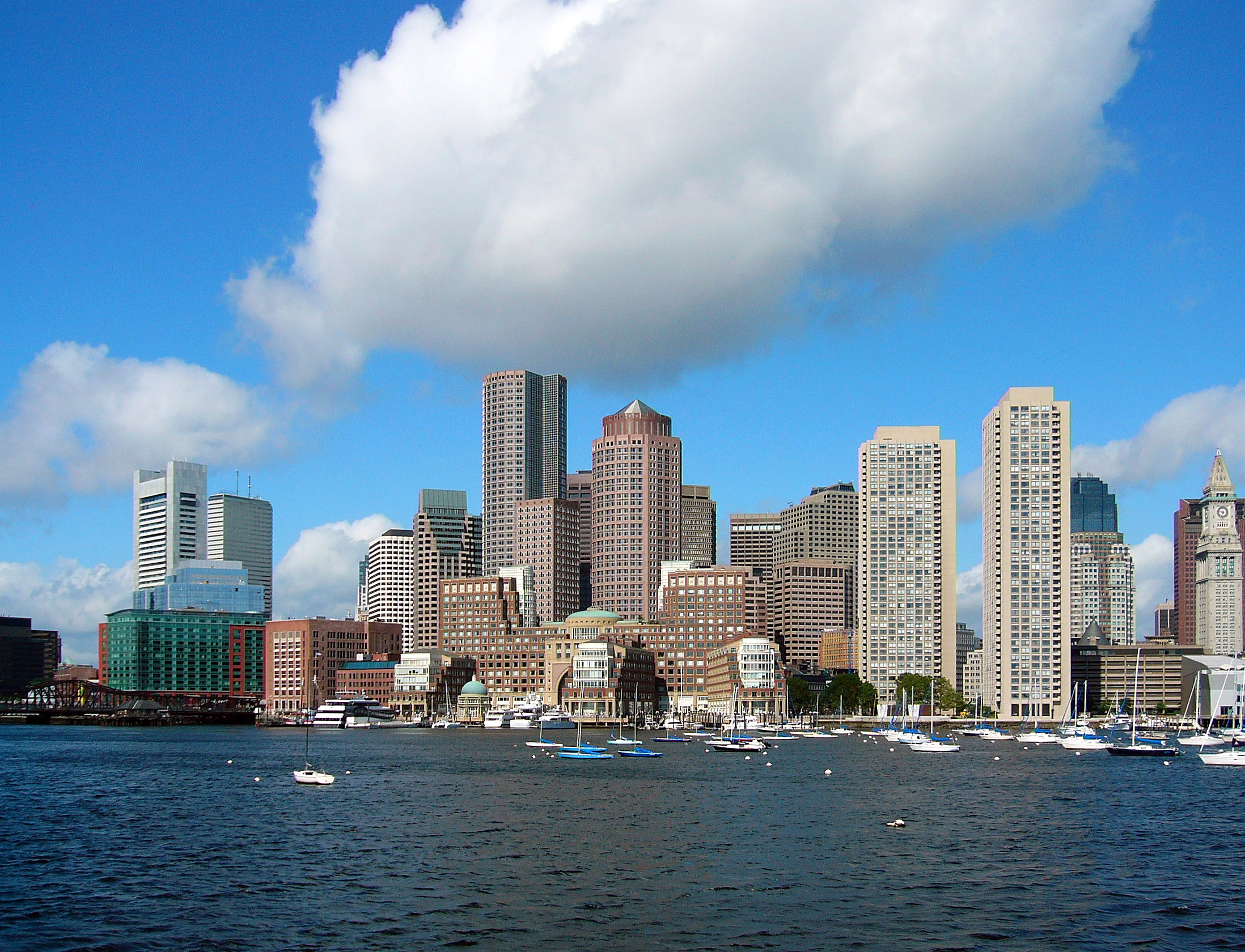
- The Financial District as seen from Boston Harbor
- Interactive map of Financial District
- Country: United States
- State: Massachusetts
- County: Suffolk
- Neighborhood of: Boston
- Time zone: UTC-5 (Eastern)
- Area code: 617 / 857

The Financial District of Boston is located in Downtown Boston, near Government Center and Chinatown.

Like many areas within Boston, the Financial District has no official definition. It is roughly bounded by Atlantic Avenue, State Street, and Devonshire Street. Parts of the Financial District are in various USPS postal ZIP Codes, including 02108, 02109, 02110, and 02111.

== Landmarks ==
The area includes Post Office Square, the Exchange Place and International Place complexes, and the landmark Custom House Tower (now an 87-room Marriott Vacation Club), and borders Quincy Market, Faneuil Hall, and the Old State House.

=== Key companies ===
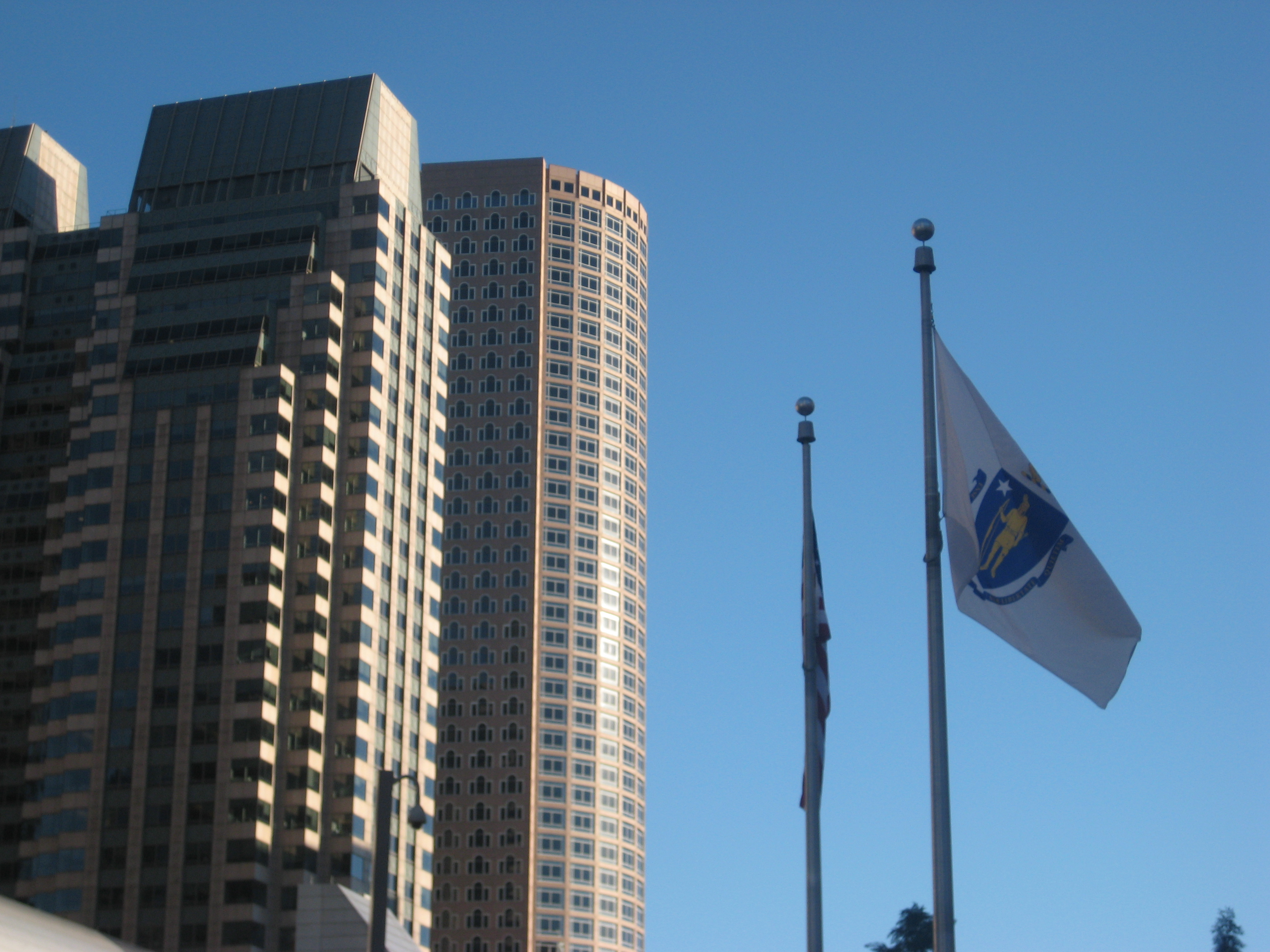
125 High Street, One International Place, and the Flag of Massachusetts in the Financial District near South Station

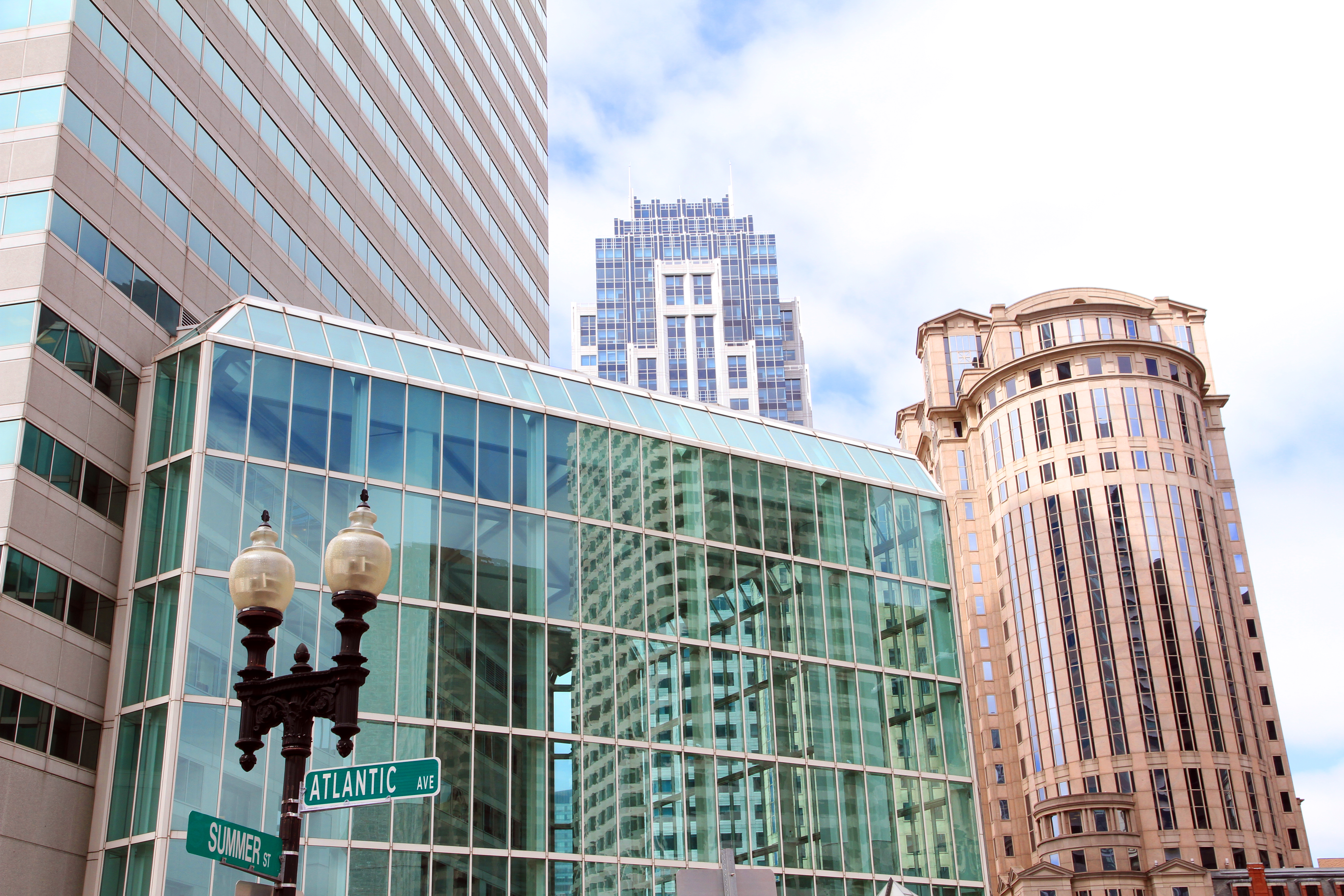
One Financial Center and nearby buildings

The Financial District also contains the headquarters of the mutual fund companies Fidelity Investments, Putnam Investments, and DWS Scudder Investments; the world headquarters for State Street Bank and Eastern Bank; accounting firms Wolf & Company, P.C., RSM McGladrey, and BDO USA, LLP; loan advisor The Debt Exchange; the law firms of Bingham McCutchen, Goodwin Procter, WilmerHale, Kirkpatrick & Lockhart Nicholson Graham, and Mintz, Levin, Cohn, Ferris, Glovsky, and Popeo, PC; the local headquarters of Bank of America (formerly Fleet Bank) and Santander Bank; the Langham Hotel Boston and Hilton Hotel; and the local offices of Merrill Lynch and other brokerages.

=== Notable buildings ===
Dewey Square, One Financial Center, and the plaza and towers housing the Federal Reserve Bank of Boston are located near South Station, adjacent to and just south of the area defined above. Also part of the Financial District are 33 Arch Street, One Federal Street, the First National Bank Building, 100 Summer Street, Exchange Place, and 101 Federal Street. The area contains many of Boston's highrise buildings in a fairly densely packed area, significantly more than the Back Bay which contains Boston's two tallest highrises, the Prudential Tower and 200 Clarendon Street.

=== Recent development ===
There has been some recent development and construction in the area. Russia Wharf was completed in 2011 along the Fort Channel and rises up to 395 feet and 32 stories. Construction of South Station Tower was scheduled to begin in 2009 but was put on hold until the spring of 2020, moving forward despite the presence of COVID-19. Upon its 2024 completion, the tower will rise to 677 feet and 51 stories. One Franklin Street has recently reworked by developers and construction commenced. Millennium Tower was completed in 2016 and stands 684 feet, the fifth tallest in the city. Other towers in the area such as the Aquarium Garage Development and the Congress Street Towers if approved could significantly change the Boston Skyline as well.

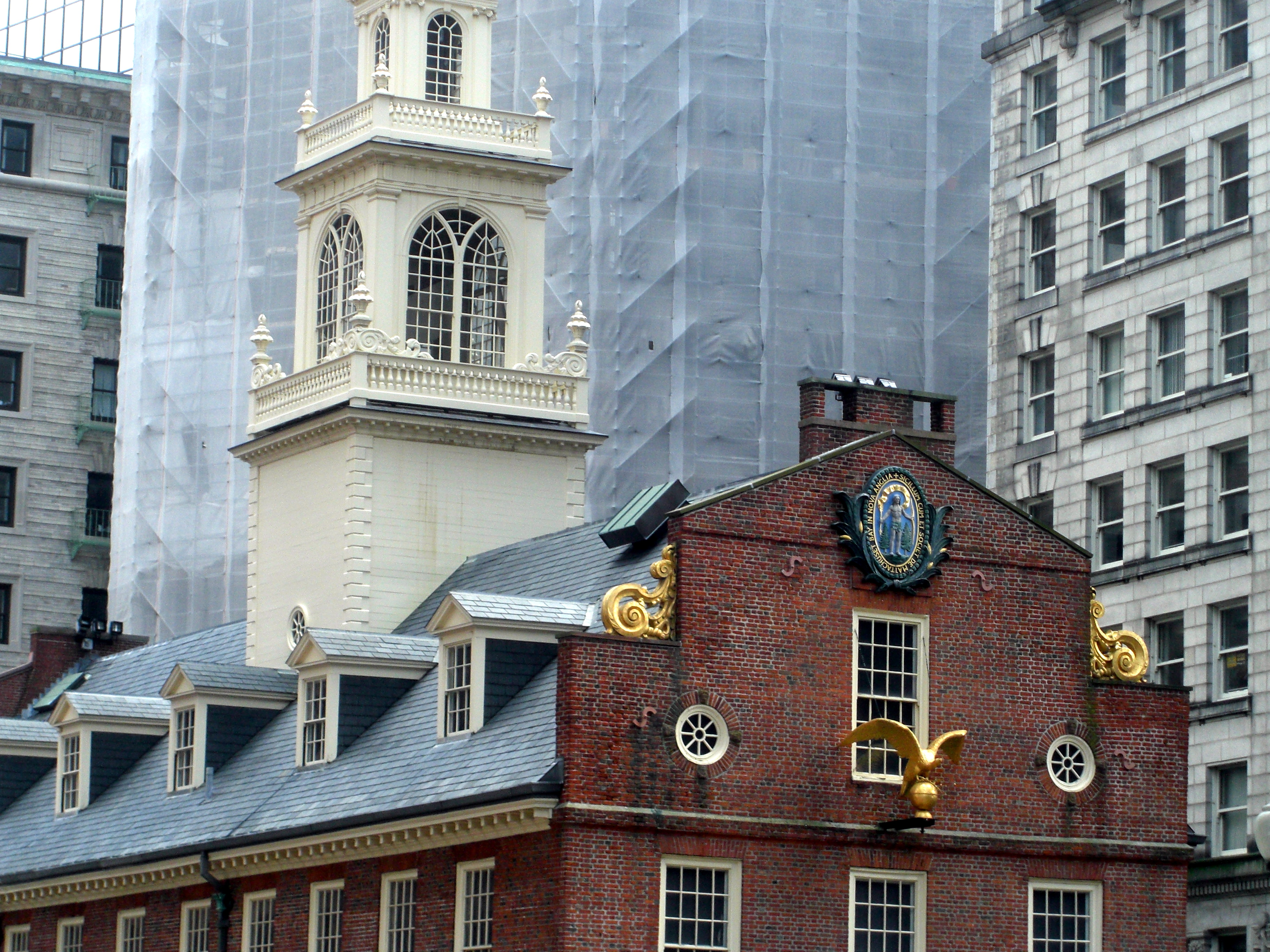
Old State House
