= Mortgage packager =

Mortgage packagers process mortgage applications, usually on behalf of mortgage brokers, for submission to lenders. Services include checking clients' credit files, instructing property valuations and checking an application fits lending criteria. In exchange for providing these services, the lender will usually pay a commission to the packager, which will usually be shared with the mortgage broker. Packagers are also sometimes able to negotiate exclusive mortgage deals with lenders that are not available directly to individual and smaller brokers, such as reduced interest rates or free property valuations.

Mortgage packagers often work with a limited number of lenders, or specialise in a certain niche market. This expertise allows them to help the mortgage broker ensure an application is made to the right lender and minimise the chance of an application being rejected before it is submitted. The services of a mortgage packager cannot usually be accessed directly by members of the public.

Normally when a buyer applies for a mortgage, the buyer spends time completing mortgage application forms with a mortgage broker. The mortgage application forms are then sent directly to a lender on the buyer's behalf.

Once the lender is in receipt of the application and supporting paperwork they start to process the application they have received, this includes applying for the buyers employer reference, accountant references and a mortgage valuation.

With this process, clients run the risk of the lender rejecting the case if the lender is not happy with everything that has been presented to them, leaving the client having to start the whole process again.

However, with a mortgage packager, the case is assessed and underwritten before it gets to the lender, reducing the risk of rejection. Should the application no longer be suitable for the lender in question, there is also the facility to switch the application to a different lender without the need of completing a new application form.
