= Calvert Investments =

American investment management company

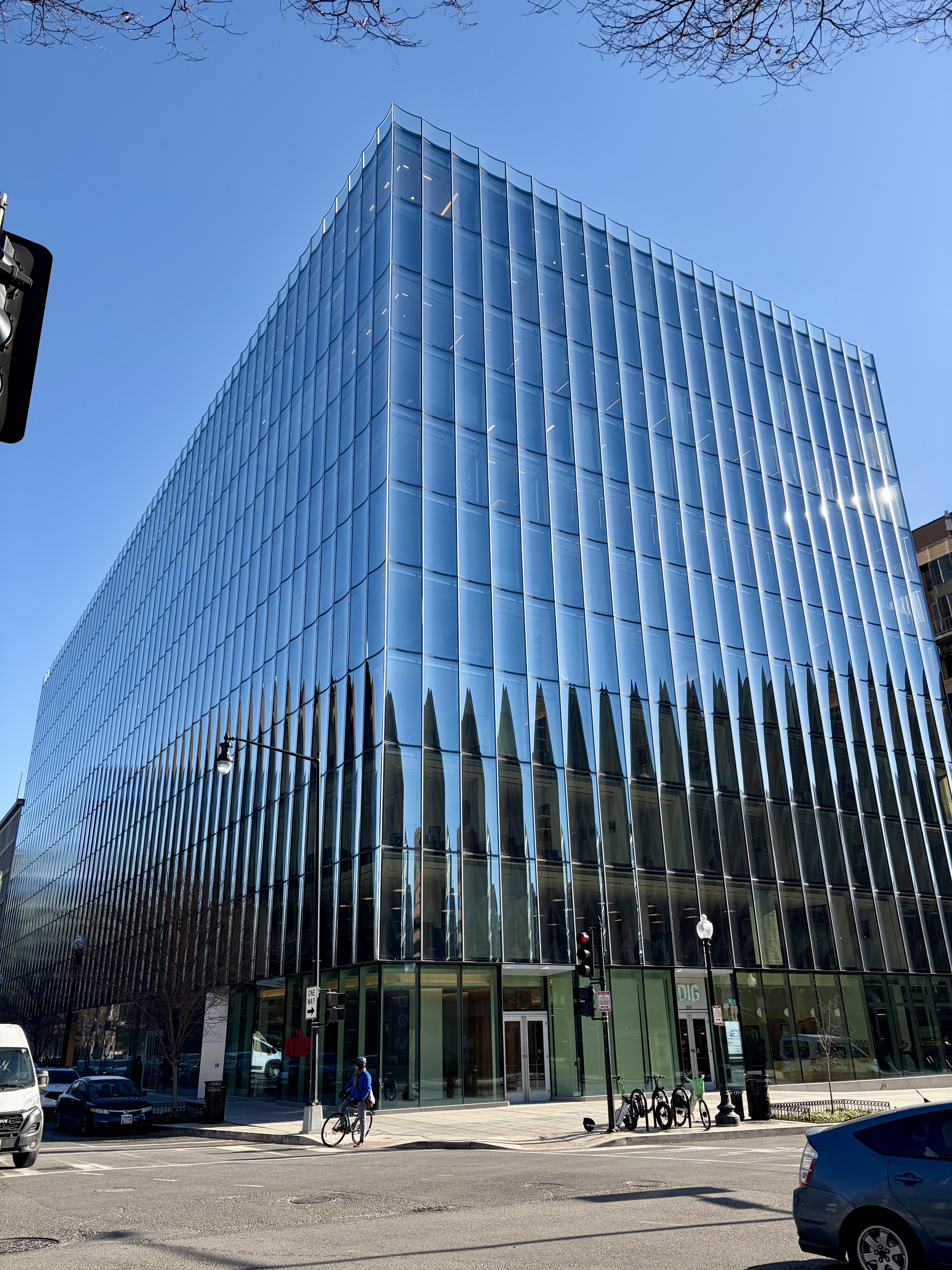
- Calvert's office in Washington, D.C.
- Company type: Subsidiary
- Parent: Eaton Vance
- Website: calvert.com

Calvert Research and Management, established in 1976, is an investment management company that is headquartered in Washington, DC, and led by John Streur, the firm's President and Chief Executive Officer. Calvert is one of the largest responsible investment companies in the United States.

== History ==
In 1976, Calvert's co-founders, Wayne Silby and John Guffey, launched the first variable rate fund in the US before introducing the Calvert Social Investment Fund (CSIF) in 1982. The Calvert Social Investment Fund (CSIF) was the first mutual fund to oppose Apartheid, and then one of the first groups to reinvest in free South Africa in 1994.

In 1986, Calvert became one of the first mutual fund groups to sponsor a shareholder resolution. Calvert filed with the Angelica Corporation, identifying the potential financial impact of labor management issue.

Calvert Investments founded the Calvert Foundation, a separate 501(c)(3) nonprofit, in 1988. The goal of the foundation is to invest directly in underserved communities.

In 1992, Calvert launched World Values Fund, the first International SRI mutual fund. Calvert also started a Special Equities Program for high impact social ventures. At the time, this program was one of the first of its kind in the responsible investing field.

In 1998, Calvert pursued an advisory opinion from the U.S. Department of Labor in support of the inclusion of sustainable and responsible investment options in defined contribution plans. In a letter to Calvert, the Department of Labor stated that it believes sustainable and responsible investment options are not inconsistent with fiduciary standards.

In 2000, Calvert introduced The Calvert Social Index (renamed Calvert US Large Cap Core Responsible Index in June 2015), which is an unmanaged index that measures the performance of large, U.S.-based sustainable and responsible companies.

Calvert began expanding the number of investment strategies offered that addressed global sustainability challenges through favorable investment opportunities. In 2007, Calvert created the Global Alternative Energy Fund, an actively managed SRI fund. The Global Water Fund followed in 2008, and in 2011, Calvert launched the Emerging Markets Equity Fund.

Calvert expanded its fixed-income mutual funds in 2013 with the launch of Calvert Green Bond Fund.

John Streur was selected as Calvert's next CEO in 2014.

In 2015, Calvert launched the Principles for Responsible Investment, which the firm uses to guide investment decisions, balancing a commitment to the needs of financial and non-financial stakeholders. Calvert's passive indices include companies on the basis of these principles and the results of a comprehensive research system, while Calvert's active investment strategies give priority to the principles as they seek superior risk adjusted financial returns relative to market benchmarks. In conjunction with the Principles for Responsible Investment, Calvert's research system developed an innovative, new method by coupling increasingly available ESG data and classic financial analysis. The Calvert Research System allows the firm to quantitatively rate and rank companies both inside their respective industry and across the entire investment universe in absolute terms.

Calvert Investment Management (CIM) was purchased by Eaton Vance in 2017 and was replaced with Calvert Research and Management (CRM).

In 2021, Morgan Stanley announced it was purchasing Eaton Vance for $7 billion. The deal was completed on March 1, 2021.

== The Calvert Foundation ==
The Calvert Foundation was founded in 1988 and is a Community Development Financial Institution (CDFI). Though the Calvert Foundation has a close relationship with Calvert Investments, the Foundation is a legally separate organization with its operations and mission. Today, the Calvert Foundation works in approximately 80 countries in varied sectors such as affordable housing development, microfinance, women's empowerment, fair trade and sustainable agriculture.
