= One International Place =

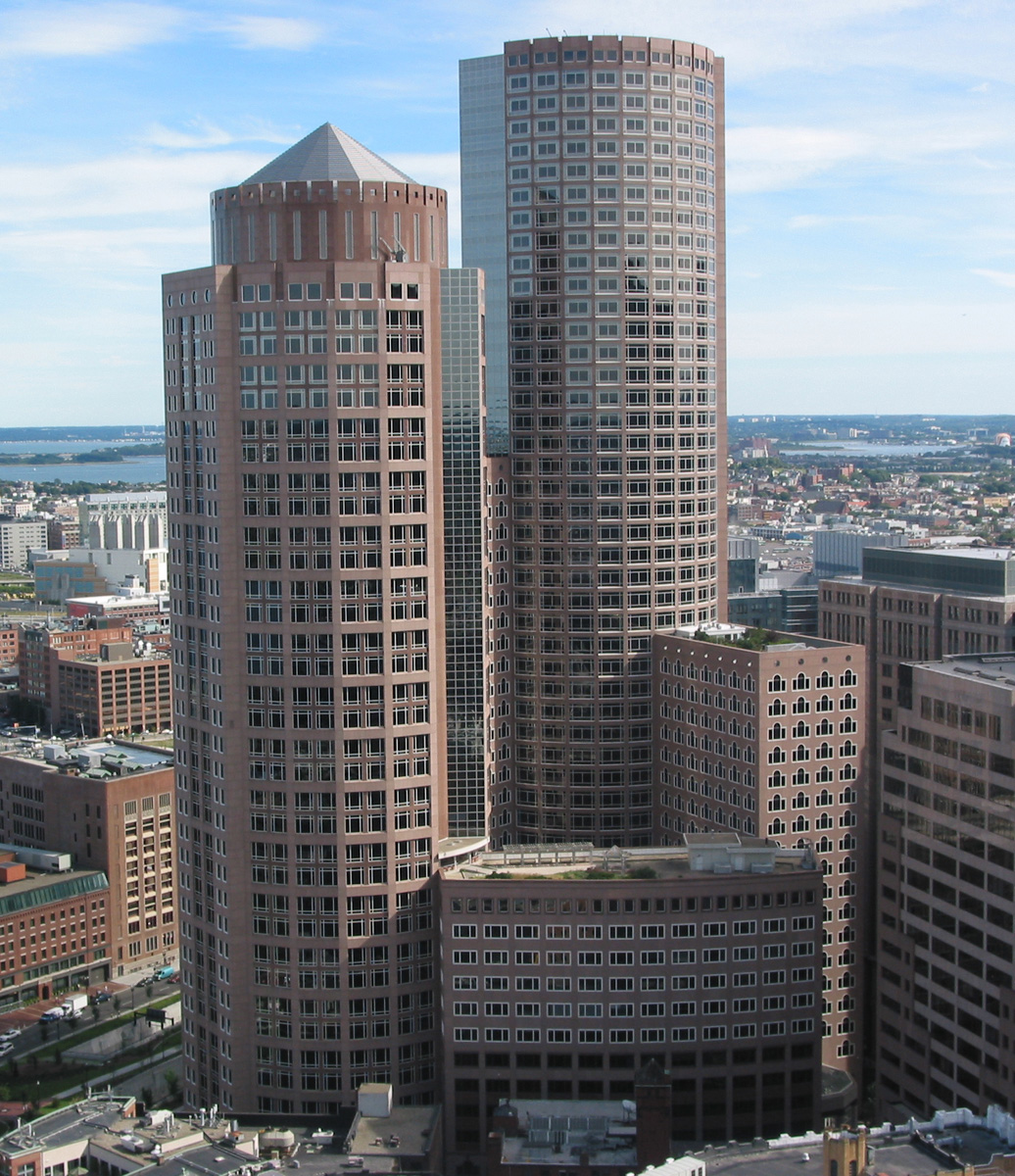
- One International Place (right), adjacent to Two International Place (left)
- Interactive map of the One International Place area

General information
- Type: Office/Retail
- Location: 100 Oliver Street, Boston, Massachusetts
- Coordinates: 42°21′20.8″N 71°03′07.5″W
- Completed: 1987

Height
- Roof: 600 ft (180 m)

Technical details
- Floor count: 46

Design and construction
- Architect: Johnson/Burgee Architects
- Developer: The Chiofaro Company

One International Place is a Postmodern skyscraper in the Financial District of Boston, Massachusetts. Built in 1987, and designed by Johnson/Burgee Architects – whose principals are Philip Johnson and John Burgee – it is Boston's tenth-tallest building, standing 600 feet (183 m) tall and housing 46 floors. The building is very prominent in the city's skyline, particularly when viewed from Boston Harbor.

The building has three separate elements. These consist of the tower itself, as well as two smaller components (27- and 19-stories), linked to Two International Place by a central dome with fifty-five-foot rain fountain court and winter garden.

An architectural critic said "the multifaceted towers offend through the dullness of their exterior articulation—particularly the density of Palladian windows, crowned with false arches". Another critic states that the Palladian windows are "a late 20th-century corporate version of the un-composed vernacular use of a decontextualised architectural element" and complain of their "relentless deployment on this vast building, that bears no relationship to the human form from which the Palladian window derived its scale".

== See also ==
- List of tallest buildings in Boston
- Two International Place
