= 100 Summer Street =

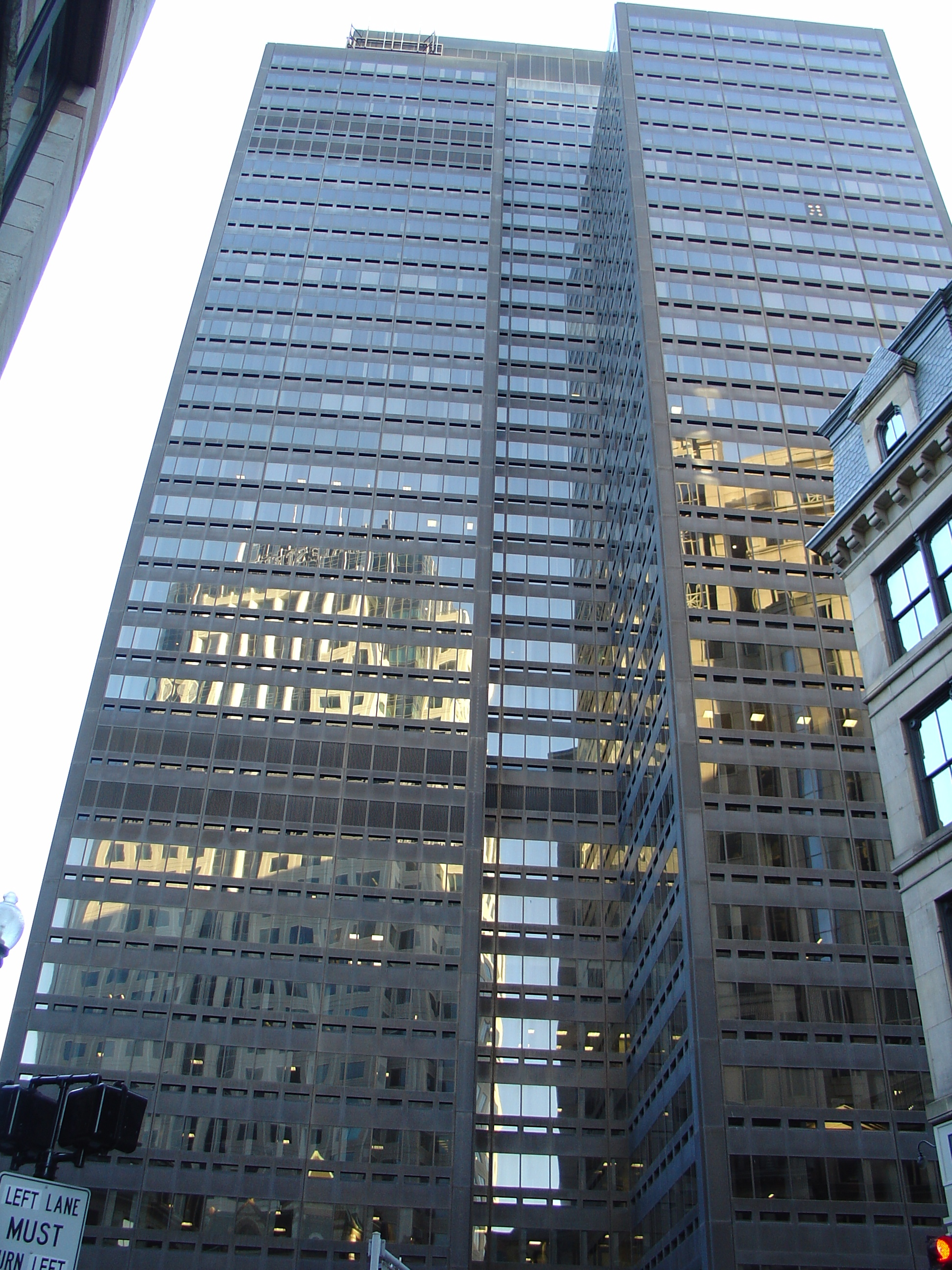
- 100 Summer Street in Boston
- Interactive map of the 100 Summer Street area

General information
- Type: Office
- Location: 100 Summer Street; Boston, Massachusetts, U.S.
- Coordinates: 42.35383°N 71.05745°W
- Completed: 1974; 52 years ago
- Owner: Rockpoint Group

Height
- Roof: 450 ft (140 m)

Technical details
- Floor count: 32
- Floor area: 1,034,595 sq ft (96,117.0 m^{2})

Design and construction
- Architect: Welton Becket and Associates
- Developer: Cabot, Cabot & Forbes

100 Summer Street is a high-rise building located in downtown Boston, Massachusetts. The building stands at 450 feet (140 m) with 32 floors, over 1.03 million square feet (over 92,000 m^{2}) of office space, and was completed in 1974. It is ranked 33rd on the list of tallest buildings in Boston. The building is notable for the distinctive bronze tint of its windows. It was designed in a U-shaped footprint to accommodate a small public plaza. Welton Becket and Associates was the architect.

In 1998, EQ Office acquired the building. In 2019 it was sold to the Rockpoint Group.

== Notable tenants ==
- Bloomberg L.P.
- Bullhorn, Inc.
- CloudHealth Technologies
- DebtX
- EverBank
- Game Show Network
- Geode Capital Management
- Google
- InvenSense
- NantHealth
- Nixon Peabody
- SimpliSafe
- State Farm
- State Street Corporation
- Veeva Systems
- VMware
- ThoughtMetric

== In popular culture ==
- In the CW television show Arrowverse, 100 Summer Street is shown as the fictional headquarters of Oliver Queen's company, Queen Consolidated (later Palmer Technologies).

== Gallery ==
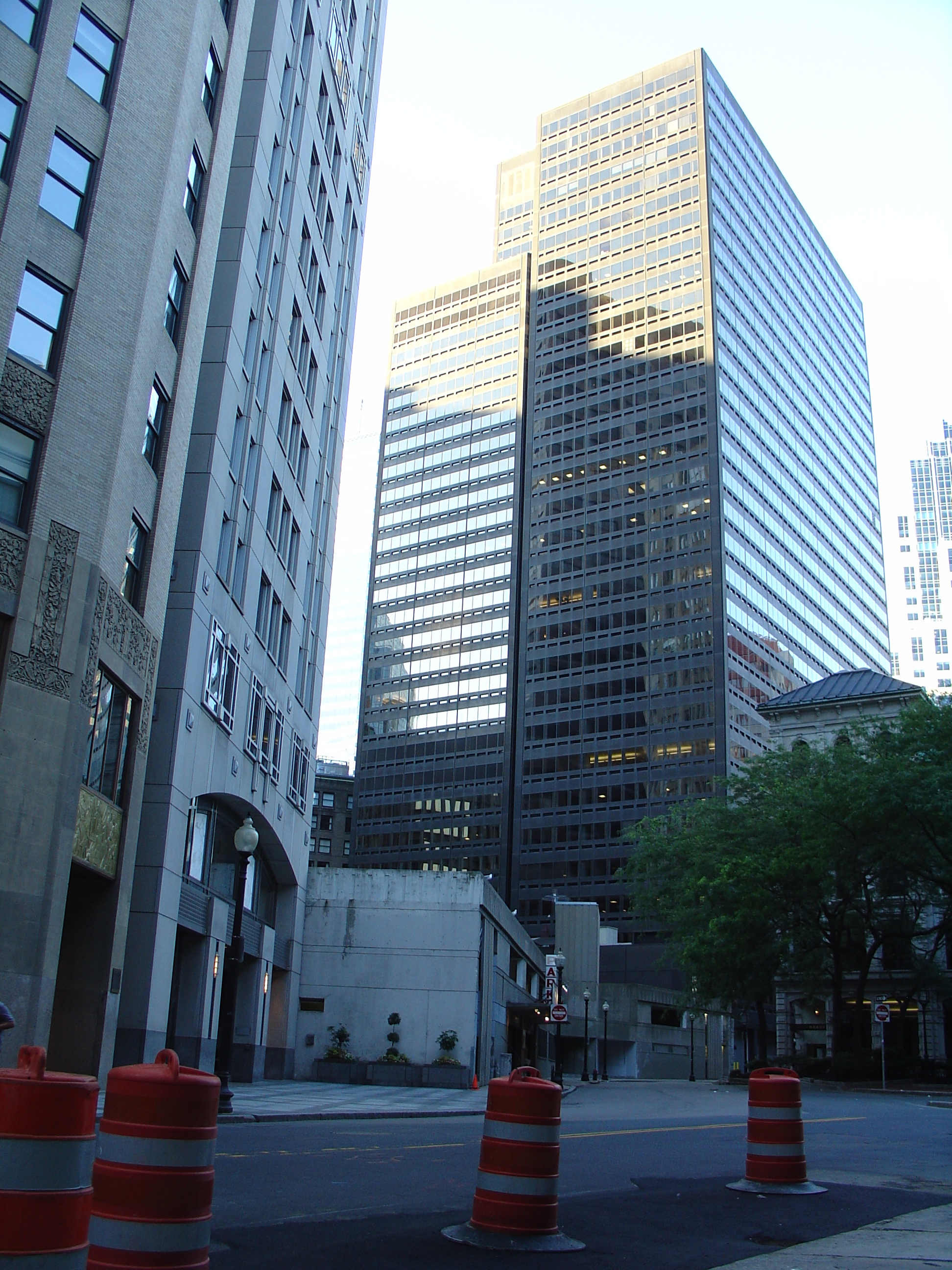

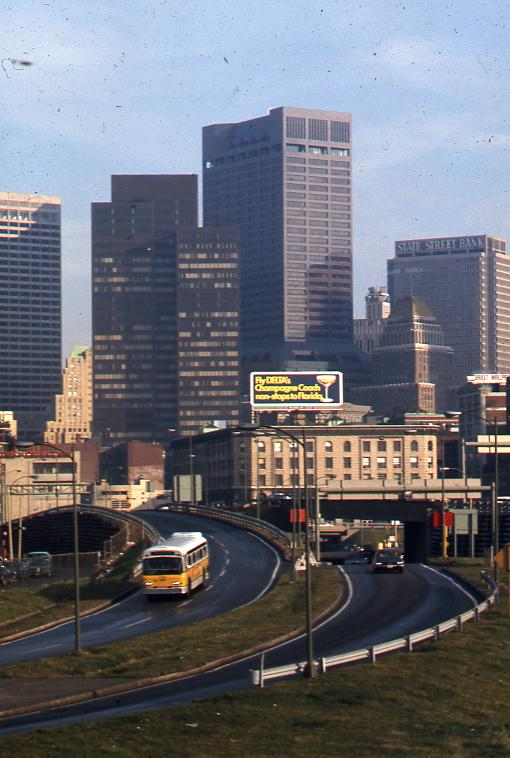

== See also ==
- List of tallest buildings in Boston
