= Geode Capital Management =

American Investment Management firm based in Boston, Massachusetts

Geode Capital Management, LLC
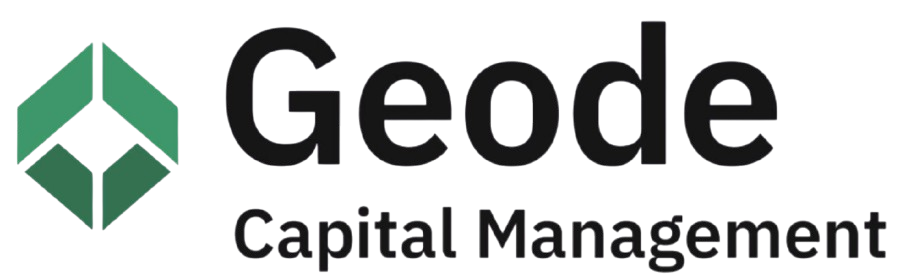

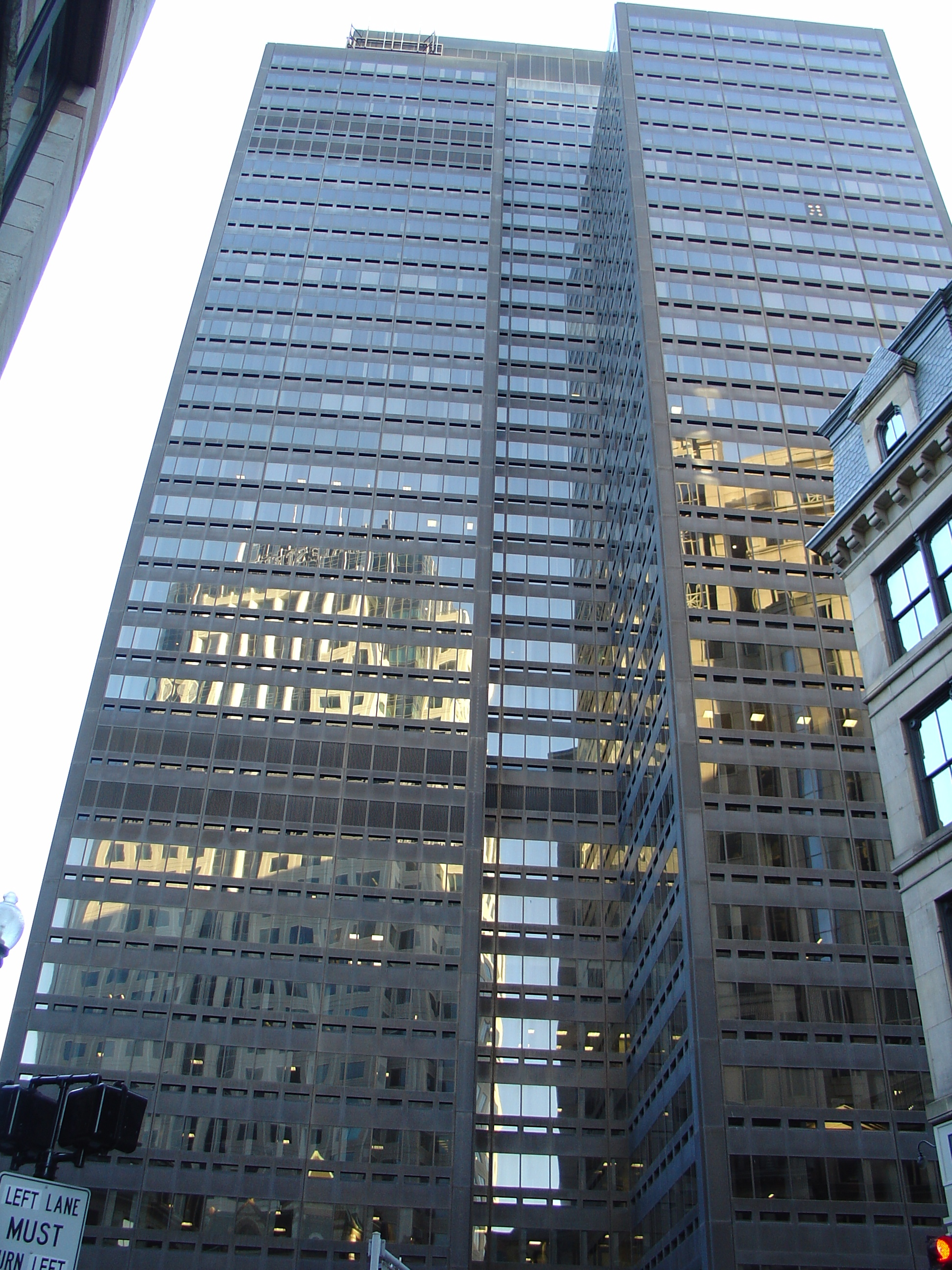
- Headquarters at 100 Summer Street
- Industry: Investment management
- Founded: 2001; 25 years ago
- Headquarters: 100 Summer Street, Boston, Massachusetts, U.S.
- Key people: David Lane (President and chief executive officer)
- Products: Index funds Quantitative funds
- AUM: $1.483 trillion (September 2024)
- Number of employees: 161 (2024)
- Website: www.geodecapital.com

Geode Capital Management, LLC (Geode) is an American investment management firm based in Boston, Massachusetts.

== History ==
Geode was originally set up by Fidelity Investments in 2001 to run systematic long/short equity strategies and to incubate new strategies. Fidelity initially committed $229 million to Geode Capital, which was computer-driven as an investor, with Fidelity executive Jacque Perold installed as the head of the firm. Perold was later succeeded in 2007 by Vince Gubitosi, who in 2021 was succeeded by Bob Minicus.

In 2003, Geode was spun off as an independent company. A possible reason was to avoid the potential conflict of Geode shorting stocks held by Fidelity's mutual funds. Although separate from Fidelity, it remained located near Fidelity's headquarters on Summer Street in Boston. It continued to manage Fidelity's passive funds as a sub-adviser, according to the Financial Times in England. That year, in 2003, Fidelity Investments hired Geode Capital Management to subadvise on three Spartan equity index funds.

In 2020, it had almost $720 billion assets under management with around 140 employees. In February 2021, the firm was profiled in the Wall Street Journal, with the paper calling it Fidelity's "Secret weapon". During the same month, the firm shut down its hedge fund business following losses due to derivatives.

At the start of 2022, Geode surpassed $1 trillion in assets under management due to the popularity of index funds.

== Operations ==
Geode primarily acts as manager (in sub-advisory role) to registered funds (most notably Index Funds) sponsored by Fidelity Investments and to affiliates National Financial Services and Fidelity Brokerage Services. Through the Fidelity Automated Managed Platform (AMP), Geode provides digital advice and discretionary investment services.

In addition, Geode also manages assets for both institutional and retail investors. This includes corporations, investment companies, pension funds, sovereign wealth funds, state and municipal government entities and charitable organizations. It also counts U.S. residents who are and aren't high-net-worth individuals as clients.

=== Owners and staff ===
The firm is owned by its employees and board of directors. Most of the staff are quants, which are engineers trained in mathematics or computer science. In 2023, Lionel T. Harris served as chairman of the board. Bob Minicus is president and CEO. The board overall included ten members.

=== Investment strategies ===
Geode invests in public equity and alternative investment markets, primarily focusing on the growth and value stocks of small to large cap companies.

Geode states it uses a systemic and risk-managed approach to investing that is team-based, seeking capture systematic sources of return by "emphasizing a repeatable, risk-managed and collaborative investment process." In pursuit of both alpha generation and beta exposure, the firm's strategies include equity indexes, options, quantitative active equity, commodities, and multi-asset classes.

== Investment funds ==
| Funds | Vintage Year | Capital ($m) |
|---|---|---|
| Fidelity U.S. Value ETF (FCUV) | 2020 | $550.8 |
| Fidelity U.S. Momentum ETF (FCMO) | 2020 | $256.3 |
| Fidelity Canadian Momentum ETF (FCCM) | 2020 | $117.2 |
| Fidelity Canadian Value ETF (FCCV) | 2020 | $182.9 |
| Fidelity All-American Equity ETF (FCAM) | 2024 | $43.6 |
| Fidelity All-Canadian Equity ETF (FCCA) | 2024 | $11.8 |
| Fidelity All-International Equity ETF (FCIN) | 2024 | $42.8 |

== See also ==
- List of asset management firms
