= Eaton Vance =

American investment management company

Eaton Vance Corporation
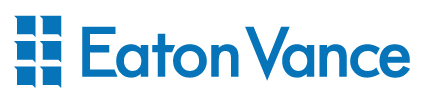
- Company type: Subsidiary
- Traded as: NYSE: EV (Non-voting)
- Industry: Investment management
- Founded: Boston, Massachusetts (1924)
- Headquarters: Two International Place; Boston, Massachusetts
- Key people: Thomas E. Faust Jr., CEO & President. Laurie G. Hylton, CFO & Vice President. Daniel C. Cataldo, CAO & Vice President.
- Products: Mutual funds, tax-managed funds, closed-end funds, variable trust funds, managed accounts, wealth management
- Revenue: ▲US$1.68 billion (2019)
- AUM: ▲US$474.4 billion (2019)
- Number of employees: 1,871
- Parent: Morgan Stanley
- Website: www.eatonvance.com

Eaton Vance Corp. is an American investment management firm based in Boston, Massachusetts. It is one of the oldest investment companies in the United States, with a history dating back to 1924.

Through five primary investment affiliates, it provides investment products to individuals, institutions and financial professionals in the US, including wealth management, defined contribution investment only and sub-advisory services. In 2005 it opened an office in London.

In March 2021, Morgan Stanley completed its acquisition of Eaton Vance, a deal announced in October 2020. With the addition of Eaton Vance, Morgan Stanley now had $5.4 trillion of client assets across its Wealth Management and Investment Management segments.

== History ==
The history of Eaton Vance dates from 1924, when Charles F. Eaton Jr., formed Eaton & Howard Inc., a Boston-based investment firm. In 1931, he became the president and director of the company. During its course of existence, the company formed several funds, including the Growth Fund in 1962; it invested primarily in common stocks of companies that enjoyed aggressive growth. In 1979, the firm was bought by Vance Sanders & Company and became Eaton & Howard, Vance Sanders Inc. Two years later, on February 20, 1981, Eaton Vance Corporation was established as a holding company.

By the end of 1983, Eaton Vance was managing 23 mutual funds and numerous individual and company accounts, with over $2.3 billion in their accounts. The company's major products were 34 low-risk and tax-free funds by late 1989. The next year, Eaton Vance started promoting its funds via banks, which resulted in a sales profit of $450 million. As of 1993, over 60 banks in the United States were offering the company's funds. By the end of the year, the firm had management assets worth $12 billion.

After restructuring its funds to a "hub-and-spoke" model, in 1995, Eaton Vance started offering new specialty funds through banks. The new funds were set to invest in companies working in entertainment, telecommunications, and PC industries. Despite the restructuring not showing up to be fruitful, by 1997, the company was managing $14.7 billion in assets, most of them coming from overseas including Greater China, Greater India, and some emerging markets.

In 2001, Eaton Vance acquired Atlanta Capital Management and Fox Asset Management. The company increased its assets under management by 17%, to $54.6 billion. In 2007, Thomas E. Faust Jr became the CEO and Chairman of the company, replacing James B. Hawkes. By September 2007, the firm owned $158.1 billion in assets under management. In 2012, Easton Vance purchased 49% of Hexavest Inc, a Canadian investment management firm.

In 2017, Eaton Vance purchased Calvert Investments, which provides mutual funds focused on socially responsible investing.

On October 8, 2020, Morgan Stanley announced they were purchasing Eaton Vance for $7 billion. The deal was completed on March 1, 2021.

== Business model and management ==
The company focuses on investment management but not wealth management, in that it focuses on investment funds rather than financial planning or brokerage services. Therefore, it does not control distribution and financial advisors or retail investors must choose their funds. It is focused on active management rather than passive.

As of 2020, Tom Faust is the Chairman and CEO of the company, a position he took in 2007.

== Affiliates ==
- Eaton Vance Management, headquartered in Boston, Massachusetts.
- Parametric Portfolio Associates, headquartered in Seattle, with offices in New York City, Boston, Minneapolis, Westport, Connecticut, and Sydney, Australia.
- Atlanta Capital
- Hexavest, headquartered in Montreal, Canada.
- Calvert Research and Management
