= CloudHealth =

Software company

CloudHealth by VMware
- Type: Subsidiary
- Industry: Software
- Founded: 2012
- Headquarters: Boston, Massachusetts, United States
- Area served: Worldwide
- Key people: Joe Kinsella (CTO and Founder), Dan Phillips (Co-Founder) Tom Axbey (CEO and President)
- Number of employees: 280+
- Parent: VMware
- Website: cloudhealthtech.com

CloudHealth Technologies, now CloudHealth by VMware, is a software company based in Boston, Massachusetts. The company provides cloud computing services related to cost management, governance, automation, security, and performance.

== History ==
CloudHealth Technologies was founded by Joe Kinsella in 2012. Dan Phillips joined as CEO and co-founder in late 2012, and Dave Eicher joined as co-Founder in January 2013. In May 2016, the company announced plans to expand from its Boston headquarters with branch offices in San Francisco, London, Washington, D.C., Sydney, Amsterdam, Tel Aviv, and Singapore. Headquarters moved in Boston from Fort Point to 100 Summer Street in the Spring of 2018, tripling in square footage.

In September 2017, Tom Axbey—who was previously at Rave Mobile Safety—joined as the new CEO and President. VMware announced its intention to acquire CloudHealth Technologies on August 27, 2018. The acquisition is "part of the information technology company's continued push into cloud-based software services" according to Reuters. The deal closed on October 4, 2018, and was reported to be in excess of $500 million.

== Technology ==
Delivered through a software as a service (SaaS) model, CloudHealth Technologies's platform collects and analyzes data from cloud computing services and other IT environments so clients can report on costs, inform their business models, and project future trends. CloudHealth Technologies is compatible with Amazon Web Services, Microsoft Azure, Google Cloud Platform, multicloud, and hybrid cloud environments. CloudHealth Technologies has received Amazon Web Services(AWS) Education Competency status, AWS Migration Competency status and achieved SOC 2 Type 2 Compliance.

== Funding ==
As of June 2017, CloudHealth Technologies has raised a total of $85.7 million through four rounds of funding.

In March 2013, CloudHealth Technologies announced that it had secured $4.5 million in Series A funding. This round was led by .406 Ventures and Sigma Prime Ventures.

In January 2015, CloudHealth Technologies secured $12 million in Series B funding. This round was led by Scale Venture Partners, .406 Ventures, and Sigma Prime Ventures, and was followed by a $3.2 million extension round.

In May 2016, CloudHealth Technologies announced $20 million in Series C funding, led by Sapphire Ventures, .406 Ventures, Scale Venture Partners and Sigma Prime Ventures.

In June 2017, CloudHealth Technologies secured $46 million in Series D funding led by Kleiner Perkins Caufield & Byers with participation from Meritech Capital Partners, Sapphire Ventures, 406 Ventures, and Scale Venture Partners.

== Competition ==
As of March 2023, CloudHealth Technologies competes with Cloudability by Apptio and CloudCheckr by NetApp.
