= Rockpoint Group =

Private equity real estate firm based in Boston

Rockpoint Group, L.L.C

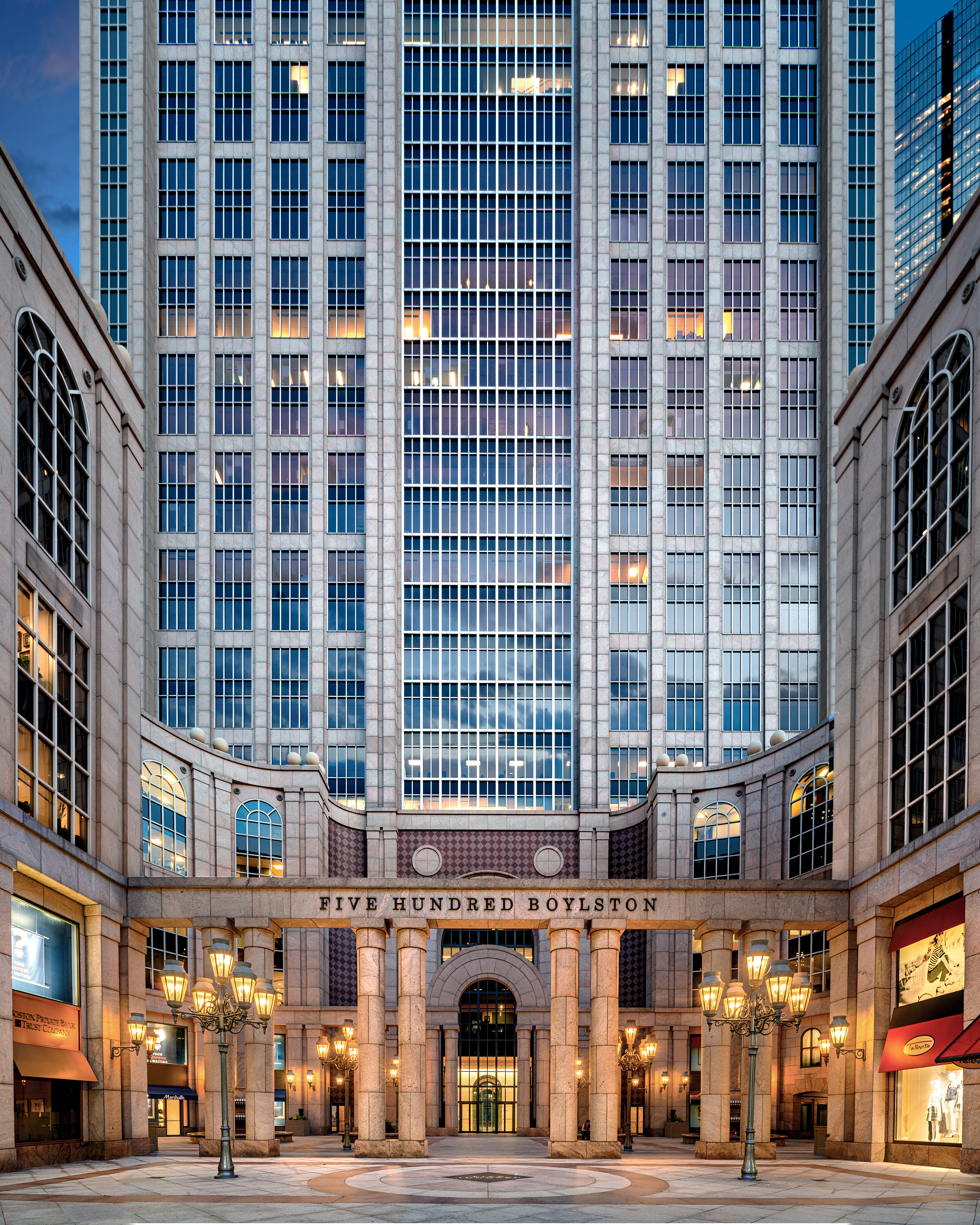
- Rockpoint Group's headquarters
- Type: Private ownership
- Industry: Private equity real estate
- Founded: 2003; 23 years ago
- Founders: Bill Walton; Keith Gelb
- Headquarters: 500 Boylston Street, Boston, Massachusetts, U.S.
- Number of locations: 4 offices
- Key people: Tom Gilbane (co-CEO); Aric Shalev (co-CEO)
- AUM: US$15 billion (June 2023)
- Number of employees: 90 (2022)
- Website: www.rockpoint.com

The Rockpoint Group (Rockpoint) is an American private equity real estate firm headquartered in Boston with additional offices in Dallas, London and San Francisco.

In 2022, the firm was ranked by PERE (under Private Equity International) as the twelfth largest Private Equity Real Estate firm based on total fundraising over the most recent five-year period.

== Background ==
Rockpoint was founded in 2003 by Bill Walton, Greg Hartman, Jonathan Paul, Keith Gelb and Pat Fox. The five of them were previously managing members of Westbrook Real Estate Partners who left to found the firm. Westbrook Real Estate Partners was co-founded by Walton in 1994 and continued to be controlled by him and Gelb until 2014 where the firm closed. Currently only Walton and Gelb remain with Rockpoint. Paul left in 2007 to co-found Wheelock Street Capital, Hartman left in 2013 to co-found Prospect Hill and Fox retired from the firm.

In March 2018, Blackstone Inc. acquired a 20% stake in Rockpoint.

In October 2020, Rockpoint formed a $1 billion joint venture with Invitation Homes to buy, renovate and rent out single-family homes across the U.S. In March 2022, they formed another joint venture worth $300 million to acquire higher-end single-family homes.

In May 2022, Rockpoint formed a $2 billion industrial real estate platform with a wholly owned subsidiary of the Abu Dhabi Investment Authority.

Rockpoint has an affiliate named Rockhill Management which is a dedicated property services management company.

In December 2025, Rockpoint named Tom Gilbane and Aric Shalev co-CEOs of the company.

== Investments ==
- 75 State Street
- 100 Pine Center
- 100 Summer Street
- 299 Park Avenue
- 1333 H Street
- Austin, Nichols and Company Warehouse
- Boston Park Plaza
- Embarcadero West
- One Dag Hammarskjöld Plaza
- Parc 55 San Francisco
- Park Avenue Plaza
- Parkmerced
- Rodin Studios
- Row NYC Hotel
- Spring Creek Towers
- The Newbury Boston
- Washington Harbour

== Disputes ==
In November 2019, tenants of 63 Wall Street and 67 Wall Street in Manhattan filed a class-action lawsuit against Rockpoint over alleged rent-regulation violations. Rockpoint was alleged to have failed to follow the 421-g program which allowed it to forgo property taxes but required it to offer rent-regulated leases. Rockpoint was considered to have overcharged above the lease limits while still benefiting from tax breaks. In September 2020, Rockpoint reached a settlement where it would pay out $5 million to 4,800 current and former tenants.
