= SimpliSafe =

American home security company

SimpliSafe, Inc.
- Type: Private
- Industry: Home security
- Founded: August 11, 2006; 19 years ago
- Founders: Chad Laurans; Eleanor Laurans
- Headquarters: 100 Summer Street, Boston, Massachusetts, U.S.
- Area served: United States, United Kingdom
- Key people: Christian Cerda, CEO
- Products: Home security systems
- Number of employees: 1200
- Website: simplisafe.com

SimpliSafe, Inc. is a company that produces and sells home security systems and monitoring services. The company is headquartered in Boston, Massachusetts.

== History ==
=== 2006–2009: Founding ===
SimpliSafe, Inc. was founded on August 11, 2006 by then-Harvard Business School students, Chad and Eleanor Laurans after several friends in the Cambridge area experienced home break-ins, but couldn't find a security company that was designed to help renters.

The couple worked on SimpliSafe in their own home from 2006 to 2008. Mr Laurans designed the system and tested it at friends’ residences for feedback. SimpliSafe officially launched in 2009 with initial funding from angel investors, introducing the industry's first do-it-yourself (DIY) home security system.

=== 2010–2015 ===
In 2010, revenue for the company was $1.4 million. In 2013 revenue was $38.5 million.

In May 2014, Sequoia Capital invested $57 million in SimpliSafe through a Series A round of funding. The same year, the company was reported to have more than 100,000 subscribing customers and was listed as the second-fastest growing company in the Boston area on the Inc. 5000 list.

In 2015, SimpliSafe grew from 100 employees to about 250 employees, and was reported to have 300,000 customers.

That same year, SimpliSafe launched its products to nationwide retailers, as well as online.

=== 2016–2019 ===
In February 2016, independent security firm IOActive identified a potential RF system vulnerability that could be used to target SimpliSafe and other RF-based monitoring systems, allowing them to be disabled. The company acknowledged the vulnerability, noting that the vulnerability was caused by unencrypted signals. In 2018, the company released a firmware update that encrypted all signals to solve the vulnerability.

In June 2017, SimpliSafe launched its SimpliCam security camera as well as Video Verification, a feature that allows SimpliSafe's professional monitoring agents to view camera recordings and verify that an active emergency event is taking place within the home.

In January 2018 at the Consumer Electronics Show (CES), the company introduced the third-generation version of its product line that allowed frequent firmware updates of the technology to address the RF vulnerability. The revamped system also introduced a new look to its products, designed in conjunction with design firm IDEO.

On June 29, SimpliSafe announced that private equity firm Hellman & Friedman had taken a controlling interest in the company in a deal valued at $1B. In October, the firm launched its Video Doorbell Pro, the second camera in its product line-up, to give customers better visibility of activities happening outside the home.

In April 2019, its international expansion, which began with the opening of an office in Manchester, England, allowed the company to offer its home security products to homeowners across the United Kingdom. In December, four months after launching its Smart Lock, it announced that the former CEO of iRobot, Christian Cerda, would occupy the same position at SimpliSafe.

=== 2020–Present ===
In 2020, SimpliSafe launched a customer support center in Richmond, VA. In August 2021, it added a third camera to its suite of products, the Wireless Outdoor Security Camera, expanding the company's protective services outside of the home.

In May 2022, SimpliSafe raised in excess of $200 million of incremental funding to support growth, while also refinancing its existing facilities. This funding was provided by the affiliates of Capital One, N.A., HPS Investment Partners, Owl Rock [a division of Blue Owl] and Eastern Bank.

In October, SimpliSafe opened the home security industry's first owned-and-operated monitoring center in Richmond, VA. Later that year, SimpliSafe also launched a Bell Box to the United Kingdom, the most requested United Kingdom customer product.

At the beginning of 2023, SimpliSafe relocated its headquarters, moving from its first Boston office at 294 Washington Street to 100 Summer Street. The new headquarters features a dedicated research and development lab and a maker space.

In June, it launched the Smart Alarm Wireless Indoor Security Camera, alongside a new 24/7 live guard protection service. The monitoring feature allows professional monitoring agents to interact with intruders via the camera and alert emergency authorities about crimes in progress.

Also in 2023, the firm added two new members to its executive team: Crystal Caliguiri as Chief Customer Experience Officer and Rebecca Zavin as CTO. Two years ago, when an agreement was announced for its sale to the private equity firm GTCR, it was reported that Cerda and other board members would retain their positions.

On November 12, 2025, SimpliSafe announced that Hellman & Friedman had completed the sale of the firm to GTCR.

== Products and services ==
=== System overview ===
All of SimpliSafe's systems include a Base Station and a Keypad. Systems are designed to be self-installed, but SimpliSafe also offers the option for professional installation. Previous systems worked on a cellular connection, while the third-generation system runs on both cellular and Wi-Fi to prevent a loss of service during a cellular outage. The wireless system also runs on lithium batteries, and can't be disabled by cutting the user's power. As a standalone product, SimpliSafe systems function as a noise-only alarm system, emitting an 85-decibel siren.

=== Services ===
In addition to selling hardware products, SimpliSafe offers self-monitored and professionally monitored security plans without long-term contracts.

- Fast Protect Monitoring: Provides 24/7 emergency dispatch, including police, firefighters, and EMS.
- Standard Monitoring: Offers continuous monitoring with emergency dispatch capabilities and environmental alert notifications.

=== Integrations ===
On April 10, 2018, SimpliSafe integrated with August Smart Lock, allowing SimpliSafe users to lock and unlock their door automatically upon arming and disarming their system, respectively. SimpliSafe also integrated with Amazon Alexa in 2018. Alexa users are able to check their system status with voice commands, as well as arm — but not disarm — their system. On Sep 19, 2018, SimpliSafe integrated with Google Assistant. As with Alexa, SimpliSafe users can check their system status or arm their system with voice commands.

== Recognition ==
SimpliSafe has been recognized with several awards since its inception, highlighting its technological innovations and company culture. Notable awards include:

- A “Best Customer Service” company by Newsweek in 2020, 2021 2022, 2023 and 2024
- “Best Place to Work” by the Boston Business Journal in 2021 and 2022
- “Best Overall Home Security Systems” by U.S. News & World Report in 2020, 2022 and 2023
- “Best DIY Alarm System” by CNET in 2020 and 2021
