= Guo Peiyuan =

Chinese business executive

Dr. Guo Peiyuan, who holds a Ph.D. in Management from Tsinghua University, is the general manager of SynTao and chairman of SynTao Green Finance. Dr. Guo Peiyuan continuously focuses on research and practices about corporate social responsibility (CSR) and socially responsible investment (SRI), with abundant experience on research, training and consulting services.

== Career ==
Dr. Guo Peiyuan has served for over one hundred companies, governments, and social organizations home and abroad, including China Mobile, China Pacific Insurance, Amway China, Volkswagen, International Finance Corporation (IFC), World Wide Fund for Nature (WWF), etc. He has served as a judge in multiple CSR awards. Now he also teaches MBA course Business Performance and Sustainability in School of Economics and Management, Tsinghua University, and teaches international student course Social Innovation and CSR in School of Social Development and Public Policy, Beijing Normal University.

== Organizations ==
He also serves as consultant, trainer or member in many organizations, including the following.

·Member of the stakeholder council of Global Reporting Initiative (GRI)

·Trainer of Global Reporting Initiative (GRI)

·Member of Green Finance Committee of China Finance Society

·Project leader of financial sustainable development project in China Banking Association

·CSR instructor of Deutsche Gesellschaft für Internationale Zusammenarbeit (GIZ)

·Adviser of China Charity Leader Training Plan

·Expert of China Corporate Citizenship Committee

·Member of Youth Think-Tank of China Woman Development Foundation

·Member of CSR Think-Tank of China Federation of Industrial Economics

·Member of sustainability reports advisory group in United Nations Conference on Trade and Development (UNCTAD)

·Member of South Korea CSR top 30 of East Asia Committee.
