= Bullhorn, Inc. =

American cloud computing company

- Type: Private
- Industry: Customer relationship management Recruitment
- Founded: 1999; 27 years ago
- Founder: Roger Colvin; Barry Hinckley; Art Papas
- Headquarters: Boston, Massachusetts, United States
- Key people: Art Papas (CEO); Gordon Burnes (CMO); Brian Sylvester (CFO)
- Revenue: $219.9M (2020)
- Website: www.bullhorn.com

Bullhorn, Inc. is an American cloud computing company headquartered in Boston, Massachusetts. The company provides customer relationship management (CRM), applicant tracking system (ATS) and operations software for the staffing industry. In addition to its Boston headquarters, the company has operations in St. Louis, London, Brighton, Sydney, and Rotterdam.

== History ==
Bullhorn was founded in 1999 by Roger Colvin, Barry Hinckley, and Art Papas, who is CEO. The company originally launched as a platform for freelancers to find and collaborate on work, but in 2001 changed its focus to build CRM software for vertical markets.

The company has historically focused on providing software-as-a-service to third-party staffing and recruiting firms, allowing them to manage business operations on a single web-based platform. It became one of the largest providers of technology to the staffing and recruiting market, reportedly growing revenue from $2 million in 2004, to $20 million in 2009, $33.6 million in 2011, $40 million in 2012, and $67 million in 2013.

Bullhorn raised its first round of venture capital funding in 1999 with a $4 million investment from GE Asset Management and Internet.com. It then raised $26 million from General Catalyst Partners and Highland Capital Partners in 2008. In June 2012, Vista Equity Partners acquired Bullhorn for a reported price of several hundred million dollars.

By 2013, Bullhorn had 6,000 customers in 34 countries.

During Vista's ownership, the company quadrupled in revenue by focusing on serving the staffing and recruiting industry and acquiring several companies, including MaxHire Solutions, Sendouts, The Code Works, and EASY Software Solutions, makers of timeshEASY.

In April 2016, Bullhorn moved its Boston headquarters from the Ft. Point district to Downtown Crossing.

In October 2017, Insight Venture Partners acquired Bullhorn from Vista.

== Acquisitions ==
In September 2017, Bullhorn International acquired Connexys, a leading provider of recruitment services for mainland Europe, to supercharge its expansion into mainland Europe. Two months later, acquired Peoplenet, a leading provider of cloud-based workforce management solutions. The company also announced the official closing of Insight Venture Partners’ acquisition of Bullhorn, which included an investment from Genstar Capital.

In March 2018, Bullhorn acquired Talent Rover and Jobscience, two of the leading providers of recruitment software built on the Salesforce platform.

Cube19 was acquired in November 2021 and in January 2022 Cleveland-based software startup Able was purchased.

In 2024, Bullhorn acquired Amsterdam-based Textkernel and Houston-based Target Recruit was acquired in August 2025.
