= Warehouse line of credit =

Credit line used by mortgage bankers

A warehouse line of credit is a line of credit used by mortgage brokers to temporarily fund mortgage loans before selling them to permanent investors. It is a short-term revolving credit facility extended by a financial institution to a mortgage originator (a company that creates mortgage loans) for the funding of mortgage loans.

Warehouse lines of credit play make the mortgage market more accessible to property buyers, as many mortgage bankers would not be able to attract sufficient deposits necessary to fund mortgage loans independently. This financing mechanism allows these lenders to provide mortgages at more competitive rates while enabling institutions with limited capital to originate significantly more loans than their capital base would otherwise permit. The facility operates on a cyclical basis, with loans typically held for 10-20 days before being sold to permanent investors, allowing the credit line to be repaid and reused for subsequent loans.

The International Finance Corporation has set up warehouse lines of credit around the world and has developed a guide on how they work.

== Process ==
The warehouse lending process follows a cyclical pattern:

1. A mortgage banker takes a loan application from a property buyer
2. The loan originator secures an institutional investor (often a large commercial bank) to whom the loan will be sold, either directly or through securitization
3. The mortgage banker draws on the warehouse line of credit to fund the mortgage
4. The loan documentation is sent to the warehouse lender as collateral for the line of credit
5. The warehouse lender perfects a security interest in the mortgage note
6. When the loan is sold to a permanent investor, the line of credit is repaid with wired funds from the investor

The selection of both the warehouse lender and the permanent investor is typically based on published rates for various types of mortgage loans and the loan products each institution accepts.

== Terms and structure ==
Loans are typically held on warehouse lines for 10-20 days, known as "dwell time." This duration depends on how quickly investors review submitted mortgage loans for purchase. Warehouse facilities usually limit the maximum dwell time, and mortgage bankers may be required to purchase loans exceeding this limit with their own capital.

The warehouse funding providing institution accepts various types of mortgage collateral, including subprime and equity loans, residential or commercial, including specialty property types. The warehouse lenders in most cases provide the loan for a period of fifteen to sixty days. Warehouse lines are typically priced at 1-month LIBOR plus a spread. Warehouse lenders generally apply a "haircut" to advances, funding only 98-99% of the loan's face value, with originators providing the remainder from their own capital.

=== Types of funding ===
Warehouse lending operates under two primary models:

- Wet funding: The mortgage originator receives funds simultaneously with loan closing, before documentation reaches the warehouse lender
- Dry funding: The warehouse lender reviews loan documentation before releasing funds

== Purpose ==
Reasons for using a warehouse line of credit include:

- Permanent Funding: Mortgage lender does not have to draw deposits - the line of credit provides permanent funding for the life of all loans in the program.
- Less Risk: No margin calls - once the asset is funded, there is generally no additional mark-to-market and/or posting of additional collateral. In the event a loan exceeds dwell limit as described above, additional collateral may be required.
- Leverage: A Warehouse line of credit provides the mortgage banker with leverage. This leverage can be as high as 15:1. Leverage increases return by allowing a mortgage banker with relatively limited capital (compared to a traditional depository) to originate and sell far more mortgages than its capital would otherwise allow. This feature enables specialty lenders to maximize loan production revenue while minimizing their need to manage multiple sources of equity or other debt.

In addition, the warehouse credit provider can manage exposure to the mortgage loan market without building a branch network of its own.

== Risk Management ==
An important risk management function of warehouse lending is fraud detection and deterrence. The primary fraud risks include collusion between mortgage bankers, title companies, real estate agents, and customers themselves, as well as falsified information in the loan application (especially appraisals), forged signatures on loan documents, and false documents of title that together create unsaleable and/or fraudulent loans pledged as warehouse collateral. 'Wet funded" loans are riskier in terms of possible fraud because the credit provider will not be aware of potential collateral problems until after the funds are sent to the loan closing agent. Measures that the warehouse lender can take to limit fraud can be a strong screening process for mortgage banking companies, making sure the loan originator itself has a strong internal screening process, limiting the amount available for 'wet funding,' and requiring that all payment proceeds come through the warehouse lender first from the end purchaser of the mortgage loan held for resale.

== See also ==
- Warehouse bank
