= Mortgage broker =

Intermediary who facilitates transactional use of debt tied to real estate

A mortgage broker acts as an intermediary who brokers mortgage loans on behalf of individuals or businesses. Traditionally, banks and other lending institutions have sold their own products. As markets for mortgages have become more competitive, however, the role of the mortgage broker has become more popular. In many developed mortgage markets today, (especially in the United States, Canada, the United Kingdom, Australia, New Zealand, Spain and Italy), mortgage brokers are the largest sellers of mortgage products for lenders. Mortgage brokers exist to find a bank or a direct lender that will be willing to make a specific loan an individual is seeking. Mortgage brokers in Canada are paid by the lender and do not charge fees for good credit applications. In the US, many mortgage brokers are regulated by their state and by the CFPB to assure compliance with banking and finance laws in the jurisdiction of the consumer. The extent of the regulation depends on the jurisdiction.

== Duties of a mortgage broker ==
The nature and scope of a mortgage broker's activities vary with jurisdiction. For example, anyone offering mortgage brokerage in the United Kingdom is offering a regulated financial activity; the broker is responsible for ensuring the advice is appropriate for the borrowers' circumstances and is held financially liable if the advice is later shown to be defective. In other jurisdictions, the transaction undertaken by the broker may be limited to a sales job: pointing the borrower in the direction of an appropriate lender, with no advice given, and with a commission collected for the sale.

The work undertaken by the broker will depend on the depth of the broker's service and liabilities. Typically the following tasks are undertaken:

- marketing to attract clients
- assessment of the borrower's circumstances (Mortgage fact find forms interview) – this may include assessment of credit history (normally obtained via a credit report) and affordability (verified by income documentation)
- assessing the market to find a mortgage product that fits the client's needs. (Mortgage presentation/recommendations)
- applying for a lenders agreement in principle (pre-approval)
- gathering all needed documents (paystubs/payslips, bank statements, etc.)
- completing a lender application form
- explaining the legal disclosures
- submitting all material to the lender
- upholding their duty by saving their clients as much money as possible by offering best advice for the clients circumstances

== Mortgage brokerage in the United States ==
According to a 2004 study by Wholesale Access Mortgage Research & Consulting, Inc., there are approximately 53,000 mortgage brokerage companies that employ an estimated 418,700 employees and that originate 68% of all residential loans in the United States. The remaining 32% of loans is retail done through the lender's retail channel, which means the lender does not go through a broker.

The banks have used brokers to outsource the job of finding and qualifying borrowers, and to outsource some of the liabilities for fraud and foreclosure onto the originators through legal agreements.

During the process of loan origination, the broker gathers and processes paperwork associated with mortgaging real estate.

=== Difference between a mortgage broker and a loan officer ===
A mortgage broker works as a conduit between the buyer (borrower) and the lender (banks and non-bank lenders), whereas a loan officer typically works directly for the lender. Many states require the mortgage broker to be licensed. States regulate lending practice and licensing, and the rules vary from state to state. Most states require a license for those persons who wish to be a "Broker Associate", a "Brokerage Business", and a "Direct Lender".

A mortgage broker is normally registered with the state, and is personally liable (punishable by revocation or prison) for fraud for the life of a loan. A loan officer works under the umbrella license of an institution, typically a bank or direct lender. Both positions have legal, moral, and professional responsibilities and obligations to prevent fraud and to fully disclose loan terms to both consumer and lender. Agents of mortgage brokers may refer to themselves as "loan officers".

Mortgage brokers must also hold individual and company licenses through the Nationwide Multi-State Licensing System and Registry (NMLS). The goal of NMLS is to employ the benefits of local, state-based financial services regulation on a nationwide platform that provides for improved coordination and information sharing among regulators, increased efficiencies for industry, and enhanced consumer protection. Loan officers who work for a depository institution are required to be registered with the NMLS, but not licensed.

Typically, a mortgage broker will make more money per loan than a loan officer, but a loan officer can use the referral network available from the lending institution to sell more loans. There are mortgage brokers and loan officers at all levels of experience.

=== Industry competitiveness ===
A large segment of the mortgage finance industry is commission-based. Potential clients can compare a lender's loan terms to those of others through advertisements or internet quotes.

Mortgage brokers can obtain loan approvals from the largest secondary wholesale market lenders in the country. For example, Fannie Mae may issue a loan approval to a client through its mortgage broker, which can then be assigned to any of a number of mortgage bankers on the approved list. The broker will often compare rates for that day. The broker will then assign the loan to a designated licensed lender based on their pricing and closing speed. The lender may close the loan and service the loan. They may either fund it permanently or temporarily with a warehouse line of credit prior to selling it into a larger lending pool.

The difference between the "Broker" and "Banker" is the banker's ability to use a short term credit line (known as a warehouse line) to fund the loan until they can sell the loan to the secondary market. Then they repay their warehouse lender, and obtain a profit on the sale of the loan. The borrower will often get a letter notifying them their lender has sold or transferred the loan. Bankers who sell most of their loans and do not actually service them are in some jurisdictions required to notify the client in writing. For example, New York State regulations require a non servicing "banker" to disclose the exact percentage of loans actually funded and serviced as opposed to sold/brokered.

Brokers must also disclose Yield spread premium while Bankers do not. This has created an ambiguous and difficult identification of the true cost to obtain a mortgage. The government created a new Good Faith Estimate (2010 version) to allow consumers to compare apples to apples in all fees related to a mortgage whether you are shopping a mortgage broker or a direct lender. The government's reason for this was some mortgage brokers were utilizing bait and switch tactics to quote one rate and fees only to change before the loan documents were created. Although ambiguous for the mortgage brokers to disclose this, they decide what fees to charge upfront whereas the direct lender won't know what they make overall until the loan is sold.

Also See: Predatory lending & Mortgage fraud

Sometimes they will sell the loan, but continue to service the loan. Other times, the lender will maintain ownership and sell the rights to service the loan to an outside mortgage service bureau. Many lenders follow an "originate to sell" business model, where virtually all of the loans they originate are sold on the secondary market. The lender earns fees at the closing, and a Service Release Premium, or SRP. The amount of the SRP is directly related to the terms of the loan. Generally, the less favorable the loan terms for the borrower, the more SRP is earned. Lender's loan officers are often financially incentivized to sell higher-priced loans in order to earn higher commissions.

=== Secondary market influence ===
Even large companies with lending licenses sell, or broker, the mortgage loan transactions they originate and close. A smaller percentage of bankers service and keep their loans than those in past decades. Banks act as a broker due to the increasing size of the loans because few can use depositor's money on mortgage loans. A depositor may request their money back and the lender would need large reserves to refund that money on request. Mortgage bankers do not take deposits and do not find it practical to make loans without a wholesaler in place to purchase them. The required cash of a mortgage banker is only $500,000 in New York. The remainder may be in the form of property assets (an additional $2.00), an additional credit line from another source (an additional $10,000,000). That amount is sufficient to make only two median price home loans. Therefore, mortgage lending is dependent on the secondary market, which includes securitization on Wall Street and other large funds.

The largest secondary market by mortgage volume are Federal National Mortgage Association, and the Federal Home Loan Mortgage Corporation, commonly referred to as Fannie Mae and Freddie Mac, respectively. Loans must comply with their jointly derived standard application form guidelines so they may become eligible for sale to larger loan servicers or investors. These larger investors could then sell them to Fannie Mae or Freddie Mac to replenish warehouse funds. The goal is to package loan portfolios in conformance with the secondary market to maintain the ability to sell loans for capital. If interest rates drop and the portfolio has a higher average interest rate, the banker can sell the loans at a larger profit based on the difference in the current market rate. Some large lenders will hold their loans until such a gain is possible.

The selling of mortgage loans in the wholesale or secondary market is more common. They provide permanent capital to the borrowers. A "direct lender" may lend directly to a borrower, but can have the loan pre-sold prior to the closing.

Few lenders are comprehensive or "portfolio lenders". That is, few close, keep, and service the mortgage loan. The term is known as portfolio lending, indicating that a loan has been made from funds on deposit or a trust. That type of direct lending is uncommon, and has been declining in usage. An example of a portfolio lender in the US is ING Direct.

=== Improved consumer laws ===
The laws have improved considerably in favor of consumers. A mortgage broker must comply with standards set by law in order to charge a fee to a borrower. The fees must meet an additional threshold, that the combined rate and costs may not exceed a lower percentage, without being deemed a "High Cost Mortgage". An excess would trigger additional disclosures and warnings of risk to a borrower. Further, the mortgage broker would have to be more compliant with regulators. Costs are likely lower due to this regulation.

Mortgage bankers and banks are not subject to this cost reduction act. Because the selling of loans generates most lender fees, servicing the total in most cases exceeds the high cost act. Whereas mortgage brokers now must reduce their fees, a licensed lender is unaffected by the second portion of fee generation. This is due to the delay of selling the servicing until after closing. Therefore, it is considered a secondary market transaction and not subject to the same regulation.

=== Brokers and client's interests ===
As of 2007, in the United States the federal law and most state laws do not assign a fiduciary duty on mortgage brokers to act in best interests of their customers. An exception is California, where a 1979 ruling of the Supreme Court of California did establish fiduciary duties of mortgage brokers. This means that consumers, in states other than California, may be charged excessive rates and fees and are encouraged to do some shopping around prior to any agreement.

==== Predatory mortgage lending and mortgage fraud ====
Mortgage fraud is when one or more individuals defraud a financial institution by submitting false information willfully. Some mortgage brokers have been involved in mortgage fraud according to the FBI.

Predatory mortgage lending is when a dishonest financial institution willfully misleads or deceives the consumer. Some mortgage consultants, processors and executives of mortgage companies have been involved in predatory lending.

Some signs of predatory lending include:

- Falsifying income/asset and other documentation.
- Not disclosing Yield spread premium or other hidden fees BEFORE the settlement/closing.
- Failing to provide all RESPA documentation, i.e. Good Faith Estimate, Special Information Booklet, Truth in Lending, etc. so the borrower may clearly understand the mortgage terms and lender policies.
- Convincing borrowers to refinance a loan without any true benefit.
- Influencing a higher Loan Amount and inflated appraisals (usually in tandem with an appraiser).
- Unjustly capitalizing on a borrower's relative ignorance about mortgage acquisition.

Another unethical practice involves inserting hidden clauses in contracts in which a borrower will unknowingly promise to pay the broker or lender to find him or her a mortgage whether or not the mortgage is closed. Though regarded as unethical by the National Association of Mortgage Brokers, this practice is legal in most states. Often a dishonest lender will convince the consumer that he or she is signing an application and nothing else. Often the consumer will not hear again from the lender until after the time expires and then they are forced to pay all costs. Potential borrowers may even be sued without having legal defense.

== Mortgage brokerage in Canada ==
The laws governing mortgage brokerage in Canada are determined by provincial governments. Most provinces require mortgage brokerage companies to carry a provincial license.

=== Nova Scotia ===
Mortgage Brokers in Nova Scotia are licensed by Service Nova Scotia and are regulated under the Mortgage Brokers and Lenders Registration Act. Many brokers in Nova Scotia are members of the Mortgage Brokers Association of Atlantic Canada. More information about the various mortgage programs that are available to consumers can be found at Mortgage Managers.

=== Ontario ===
In Ontario, mortgage brokers are licensed by the Financial Services Regulatory Authority of Ontario (FSRA), an arms length agency of the Ministry of Finance. To become licensed an individual must meet specific licensing requirements, including passing an approved course.

In Ontario there is a difference between a Mortgage Broker and a Mortgage Agent, although they perform much of the same tasks.

While the terms Mortgage Broker and Mortgage Agent are similar, and Mortgage Brokers and Mortgage Agents fulfill many of the same functions, it is important note that there is in fact a difference.

According to Canadian Mortgage Trends the main difference between a Mortgage Broker is that, "...a mortgage broker is a firm or person licensed to deal in mortgages and employ mortgage agents" while "A mortgage agent is an individual authorized to deal in mortgages on behalf of a mortgage broker.

While many attribute these functions to a Mortgage Broker, "A mortgage agent is generally someone who finds the best mortgage for each client based on that client’s income, credit, and property profiles."

=== British Columbia ===
In British Columbia mortgage brokers are licensed by the Financial Institutions Commission (FICOM)

=== Default insurance ===
Throughout Canada, high ratio loans are insured by either the Canada Mortgage and Housing Corporation, Genworth Financial or Canada Guaranty.

== Online mortgage lending in Canada ==
As of 2017, Canada has seen a move towards mobile and online technology in the mortgage industry. CIBC has created a mobile app that is presently in beta testing. Companies are incorporating digital technology with a strong aim towards consumer awareness against bank products.

== Mortgage brokerage in the United Kingdom ==
Mortgage brokers in the UK are split between the regulated mortgage market, which lends to private individuals, and the unregulated mortgage market, which lends to businesses and investors. Many UK brokerages mediate both types of business.

The role of a mortgage broker is to mediate business between clients and lending institutions, which include banks, building societies and credit unions.

=== Types of mortgage broker ===
==== Tied or multi-tied ====
Tied mortgage brokers offer products from a single lender, while multi-tied brokers offer products from a small panel of lenders. Many tied brokers are linked to estate agents and will refer the agency’s customers to one of a handful of lenders in exchange for a commission. Mortgage specialists in banks and building societies can also be considered to be ‘tied’ brokers, insofar as they may only offer products sold by that lender.

==== Whole of market ====
The Financial Conduct Authority (FCA) requires that a mortgage broker describes its range accurately to consumers, and stipulates that one of the following disclosures be used to describe the service offered (as appropriate):

- "We are not limited in the range of mortgages we will consider for you."
- "We offer a comprehensive range of mortgages from across the market, but not deals that you can only obtain by going direct to a lender."
- "We only offer mortgages from [number] lender(s). We can provide you with a list of these."
- "We only offer mortgages from [name of lender(s)]."
- "We only offer some, but not all, of the mortgages from [number] lender(s). We can provide you with a list of these."
- "We only offer some, but not all, of the mortgages from [name of lender(s)]."
- "We only sell bridging finance products from [name of lender(s)]. We do not offer products from across the mortgage market."

==== How mortgage brokers make money ====
A mortgage broker can be either compensated by the Lender (Lender Paid Compensation) or the Borrower (Borrower Paid Compensation), but can never be compensated by both. The maximum amount a mortgage broker can be compensated by either the Lender or the Borrower, is 2.75% of the loan amount. The less that percentage is, the lower the interest rate the broker can get for the borrower. Lender Paid Compensation is a fixed percentage amount set by the Broker with the Lenders that they submit loan applications to. Borrower Paid Compensation is a percentage agreed upon between the Broker and the Borrower, however, some Lenders do not allow the Broker to make less than the fixed percentage amount outlined in the Lender Paid Compensation agreement, therefore, negating any benefit to Borrower Paid Compensation. The fees charged vary from broker to broker, but fees can be justified if the broker can expedite the application process, provide support to vulnerable clients and/or search a wide range of mortgages to find the most suitable deal based on the client's circumstances or the chosen property. The FCA's Consumer Duty regulation requires brokers to consider whether their fees represent 'fair value' to the consumer.

=== Mortgage regulation ===
Owner-occupier mortgage products, and by extension brokers of these products, are regulated by the FCA. A regulated mortgage contract is defined in the Mortgages and Home Finance: Code of Business (MCOB) as one which:

- Involves the provision of credit to an individual or trustees;
- Pertains to a first legal charge on land (excluding timeshare accommodation) of which at least 40% will be occupied by the borrower, trustee or trust beneficiary, or a close relative of any such individual; and
- Is not a home purchase plan

==== The Mortgage Credit Directive (MCD) ====
Mortgage brokers in the UK are also bound by pan-European legislation, such as the EU Mortgage Credit Directive. It is the role of UK legislators to incorporate the directive into the existing UK framework.

The broader distinction between consumers and businesses adopted within the MCD is, in some respects, contrary to the current UK framework, and as a result some exemptions previously enjoyed in the UK will be phased out. One example is where borrowers or relatives of borrowers will occupy less than 40% of a property, which is currently not considered regulated business; by 2016, such borrowers will be considered consumers. These transactions will therefore come to be regulated.

==== The Mortgage Market Review (MMR) ====
The Mortgage Market Review (MMR), a comprehensive review of the UK mortgage market which ran from 2009 to 2012 and came into force on 26 April 2014, resulted in some dramatic changes to the regulated lending environment, most centring on new, stricter affordability requirements and income and expenditure checks. There is also anecdotal evidence to suggest that the amount of time it takes to get a mortgage has significantly increased as a result of the changes. Some mortgage brokers whose in-house underwriting already matches borrowers to appropriate lenders are able to circumvent these delays, making their services more attractive.

It is speculated that, because borrowers’ applications are stress-tested on the strength of their ability to make the monthly repayments, increasing numbers of borrowers are opting for mortgage terms exceeding the traditional 25 years. This results in lower repayments but a higher overall interest bill, as well as a longer period servicing debt.

According to official figures from the Office for National Statistics (ONS), the percentage of mortgages under 25 years in length fell from 95% to 68% between 2002 and 2012.

== Mortgage brokerage in Australia ==
Mortgage brokers have been active in Australia since the early 1980s, however they only became a dominant force in the mortgage industry during the late 1990s on the back of aggressive marketing by Aussie Home Loans and Wizard Home Loans. Approximately 35% of all loans secured by a mortgage in Australia were introduced by mortgage brokers in 2008. In March 2012, the share of loans introduced by Mortgage Brokers had risen to 43%, by 2019 it was 59%, and by 2025 that figure rose further to over 80%. In 2016–2017, mortgage brokers had contributed to $2.9 billion to Australian economy.

During the 2019 Hayne Royal Commission, recommendations were made that threatened the viability of the industry. Commissioner Hayne had recommended that lenders cease paying upfront and trailing commission to Brokers and instead, that the consumer pays a yet-to-be determined upfront fee for service. The industry (led by the FBAA and MFAA) leveraged the 2019 Federal Election campaign to convince the Liberal Government to back down from introducing an upfront fee-for-service model. These efforts have been described as a 'textbook case of successful grassroots lobbying'.

Mortgage brokers are now regulated by the Australian Securities & Investments Commission. The new national consumer credit protection legislation includes a licensing regime and responsible lending obligations. Mortgage brokers are also required to be a member of an external dispute resolution provider, which since 2018 has been the Australian Financial Complaints Authority (AFCA). Furthermore, some lenders require accredited brokers to be a member of an industry body such as the Finance Brokers Association of Australia (FBAA) or Mortgage & Finance Association of Australia (MFAA). These industry associations demand that brokers complete at least 25-30 of continued professional development each year to maintain their skills and knowledge.

=== Fees ===
Australian and New Zealand mortgage brokers do not usually charge a fee for their services as they are paid by the lenders for introducing loans. They are paid an up front commission that is on average 0.66% of the loan amount and an ongoing trail commission that is on average 0.165% of the loan amount per annum paid monthly. These commissions can vary significantly between different lenders and loan products, especially since the commission re-alignments introduced by Australian banks during June to August, 2008 in reaction to the Subprime mortgage crisis.

Although mortgage brokers are paid commissions by the lenders this does not alter the final rate or fees paid by the customer as it may in other countries. Mortgage brokers do not have the ability to charge the customer a higher or lower rate and in return obtain a higher or lower commission.

In the event that the loan is paid back by the borrower within 24 months of the loan settlement, mortgage brokers are charged a "clawback" fee by the lenders since the loan is considered "unprofitable". The amount is usually 0.66% of the loan amount for loans paid back in the first 12 months and 0.33% for loans paid back in the next 12 months. When this happens the mortgage brokers are sometimes able to charge the customer the amount if they hold written authority to do this. Mortgage brokers don't like to be liable for the fee, but in some case it is unrecoverable. Keep in mind that a standard home loan in Australia is contracted over a 30-year term, with the average loan life being approximately 4–5 years.

=== Best Interests Duty ===
Mortgage brokers in Australia are required to put their clients' interests ahead of their own, even if it means their own profit suffers. This is an important element when it comes to choosing a mortgage broker because it ensures the clients' financial objectives and needs are considered.

== Mortgage brokerage in Singapore ==
The mortgage brokerage industry is still new compared to the situation in the US and the UK Not all of the banks in Singapore are tied up with the mortgage brokerage firms. The mortgage brokers are mostly regulated by the Singapore Law of Agency.

A study undertaken by Chan & Partners Consulting Group (CPCG) shows that the mortgage brokering industry is still largely a new concept to the Singapore financial consumers. However this will set to change as more consumers realize that taking up a housing loan with the mortgage broker does not increase the consumer's cost at all, and can in fact aid them in making a more informed decision.

Mortgage brokers in the country do not charge borrowers any fee, rather profits are made when the financial institutions pay the broker a commission upon successful loan disbursement via the broker's referral.

== See also ==
- Subprime mortgage crisis
- Loan sale
- Mortgage loan
- Fixed-rate mortgage
- Adjustable-rate mortgage
- VA loan
- FHA insured loan
- Mortgage packagers
