= Loan sale =

A loan sale is a sale, often by a bank, under contract of all or part of the cash stream from a specific loan, thereby removing the loan from the bank's balance sheet.

Often subprime loans from failed banks in the United States are sold by the Federal Deposit Insurance Corporation (FDIC) in an online auction format through companies. Performing loans are also sold between financial institutions.

== Use in balance-sheet and liquidity management ==
Loan sales are used by banks as a way to manage the size and composition of their loan portfolios. The OCC's Loan Portfolio Management handbook notes that banks can use the loan portfolio as a source of funds by reducing the total dollar volume of loans through sales, securitization, and portfolio run-off.

In the United States, loan sales also play an important role in bank receiverships. The FDIC's asset-sales materials describe loan sales as a method used to dispose of loans retained from failed banks, including sales of loan pools through sealed-bid processes.

== See also ==
- Internet Data Exchange (IDX)
- Commercial Information Exchange
