= 1000 Connecticut Avenue =

Coordinates: 38°54′10.1″N 77°2′24.5″W

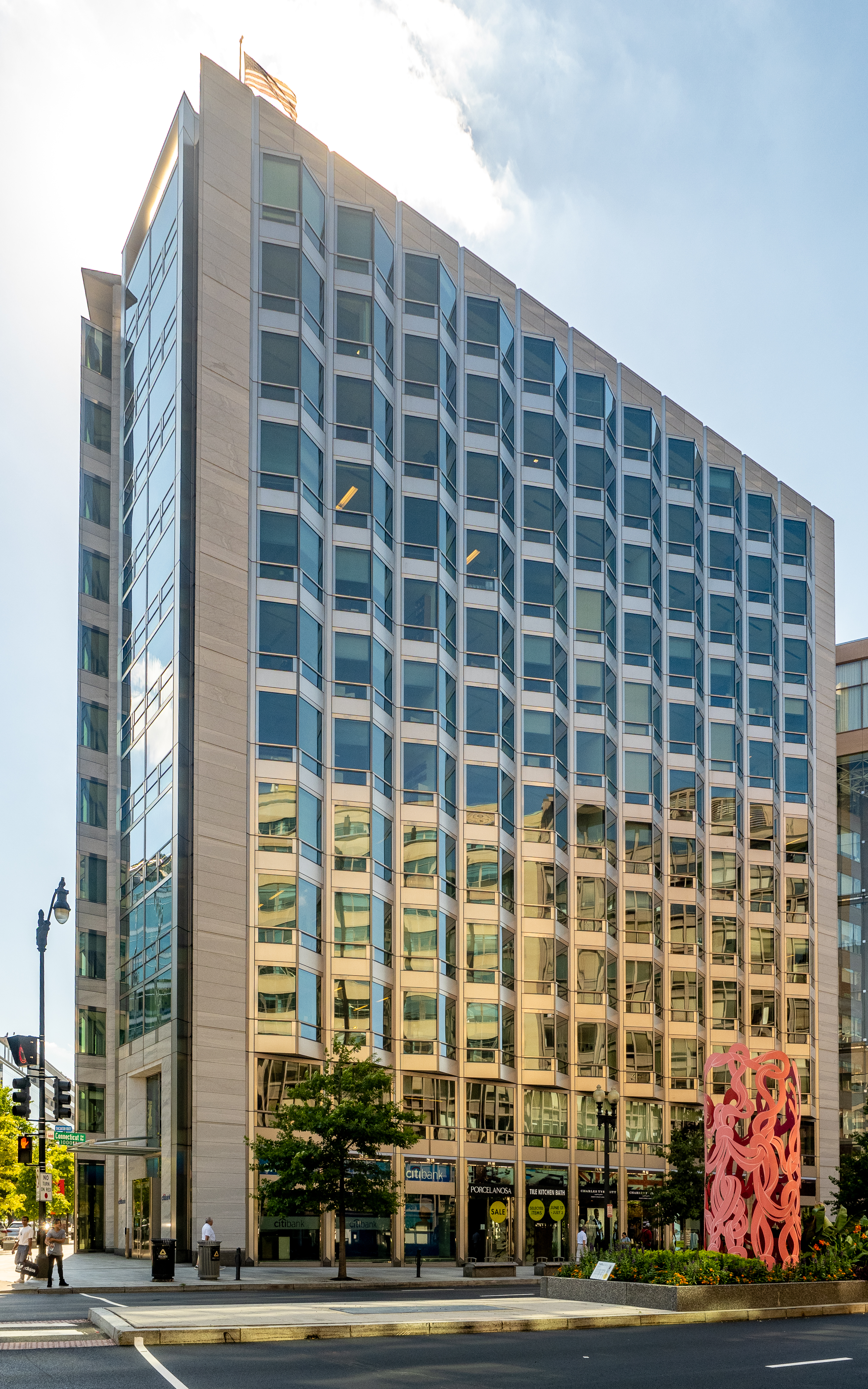
- 1000 Connecticut Avenue in 2024
- Interactive map of the 1000 Connecticut Avenue area

General information
- Type: Office
- Location: Washington, D.C., United States

Technical details
- Floor count: 12

Design and construction
- Architects: Pei Cobb Freed & Partners

1000 Connecticut Avenue is a high-rise building located in the United States capital of Washington, D.C. This building replaced a previous structure, built in 1956, which was demolished in the winter of 2007.

== Architect ==
The architect of the current building was James Ingo Freed, who teamed with New York firm of Pei Cobb Freed & Partners to design the postmodern structure of the building. This was one of several projects, including the United States Air Force Memorial that were underway when the architect died in 2005. The previous building was valued at approximately US$25,000,000. The previous building served as the headquarters for real estate agency, Manta. The previous building rose to 153 feet (47 m); due to the Heights of Buildings Act of 1910, the building's height was restricted to being lower than the width of the right-of-way of the avenue on which the building fronts. The new 1000 Connecticut Avenue was completed in 2012. A law firm, Arent Fox, leases eight floors of the building.

== See also ==
- List of tallest buildings in Washington, D.C.
