= I, Too, Am Harvard =

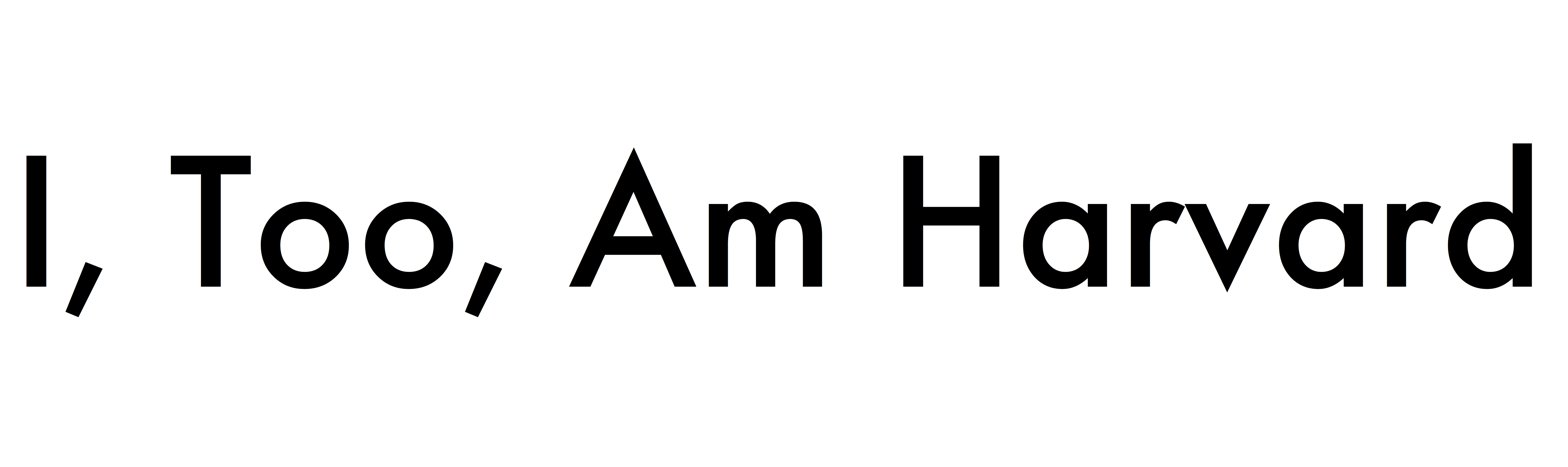
- Formation: March 1, 2014
- Founder: Kimiko Matsuda-Lawrence, Nonye Imo, Symone Isaac-Wilkins, Abigail Mariam, Tsega Tamene, Carol Powell, and Paige Woods
- Legal status: Active
- Purpose: Picturing personal experiences of being different
- Headquarters: Harvard College in Cambridge, Massachusetts, U.S.

I, Too, Am Harvard is a campaign primarily expressed as a collection of photos, which were posted on Tumblr to illustrate the personal experiences of black students at Harvard University, a private Ivy League university in Cambridge, Massachusetts. The multimedia project was the product of interviews with 61 undergraduate Harvard College students who held signs with various messages about the experiences of black students at Harvard.

== History ==
Between 2010 and 2014, Harvard's admissions of minorities, including blacks, Latinos, and Asian-Americans, ranged between 43% and 45.6%. As of 2014, African Americans make up 9.4% of the approximately 7,500 undergraduates at Harvard.

=== Origin ===
The project was started in fall 2013 by Kimiko Matsuda-Lawrence, a Harvard undergraduate, and others, and was conducted under the direction of Harvard professor Glenda Carpio. As part of it, minority students at Harvard were interviewed about their experiences at the college. They reported feelings of alienation about the Harvard campus, being the lone black student in some classes, or feeling uncomfortable about comments and social interactions with other students on campus.

Matsuda-Lawrence reported that students made comments such as "I've never told anyone this before" or "I've never been able to talk about this." The students comments were kept anonymous and she used them to write a play. To promote the play, she assembled a group of students to help create the multimedia project that appears on Tumblr. The Tumblr project consists of photos taken of students holding signs with racially insensitive and offensive remarks by peers and response they would like to make. Examples of signs included "No, I will not teach you how to 'twerk'" and "Don't you wish you were white like the rest of us?"

== Aims and response ==
The project and campaign aim to the personal experiences of minority students at Harvard, especially those that have left them feeling alienated at the university. By March 6, 2014, a link on BuzzFeed had produced over a million views. In an email to undergraduate students, Donald Pfister, interim dean of Harvard College, expressed support for the project and said: "Harvard is also about inclusion. This photo campaign, based on a play which will premiere Friday night, is a great example of students speaking about how we can become a stronger community. 'I, Too, Am Harvard' makes clear that our conversation about community does not and should not stop."

== Spread to other universities and colleges ==
Student organizers at Harvard reported messages of support from other universities, including Yale University, Duke University, the University of Pennsylvania, McGill University, and the University of Oxford,

Inspired by the campaign, minority students at McGill University, the University of Oxford, and the University of Cambridge developed similar multimedia campaigns.
